= List of listed buildings in Kincardine O'Neil, Aberdeenshire =

This is a list of listed buildings in the parish of Kincardine O'Neil in Aberdeenshire, Scotland.

== List ==
Name	Location	Date listed	Grid ref. (Note: Sometimes known as OSGB36, the grid reference (where provided) is based on the British national grid reference system used by the Ordnance Survey. • "Guide to National Grid". Ordnance Survey. • "Get-a-map". Ordnance Survey.)	Geo-coordinates	Notes	LB number (Note: Historic Environment Scotland assign a unique alphanumeric identifier to each designated site in Scotland, for listed buildings this always begins with "LB", for example "LB12345".)	Image
Learney House, Potting-Shed				57°07′51″N 2°36′25″W	Category B	9518	Upload Photo
Learney House, 'The Donkey House'				57°07′48″N 2°36′36″W	Category C(S)	9519	Upload Photo
66 North Deeside Rd. (Formerly 1 North Turnpike) Kincardine O'Neil				57°05′13″N 2°40′38″W	Category C(S)	9565	Upload Photo
Duncan's And Cafe O'Neil 50-54 (Formerly 54 And 56 North Deeside Road) Kincardine O'Neil				57°05′12″N 2°40′35″W	Category C(S)	9568	Upload Photo
44-48 North Deeside Rd. (Formerly 4, 5, 6 North Turnpike) Kincardine O'Neil				57°05′12″N 2°40′33″W	Category B	9569	Upload Photo
Tillydrine House, Formerly Annisland Park				57°04′39″N 2°39′21″W	Category C(S)	44025	Upload Photo
Learney House, West Lodge				57°07′29″N 2°36′38″W	Category B	9520	Upload Photo
Learney, North Lodge				57°08′25″N 2°34′40″W	Category B	9521	Upload Photo
Ross Cottage, Cochran				57°05′06″N 2°40′12″W	Category C(S)	9538	Upload Photo
Kincardine House, East Lodge				57°04′52″N 2°39′15″W	Category B	9544	Upload Photo
North Bridge Over Learney Burn Near Craigour				57°05′47″N 2°36′10″W	Category C(S)	9551	Upload Photo
Petrol Station Premises, Kincardine O'Neil				57°05′11″N 2°40′34″W	Category B	9558	Upload Photo
40-42 North Deeside Rd. (Formerly 7, 8 North Turnpike) Kincardine O'Neil				57°05′11″N 2°40′32″W	Category B	9570	Upload Photo
Parish Church				57°05′08″N 2°40′18″W	Category B	9575	Upload another image See more images
31, 33 North Deeside (Formerly 4, 5 South Turnpike) Kincardine O'Neil				57°05′11″N 2°40′32″W	Category B	9581	Upload Photo
Learney House, Stable-Block				57°07′52″N 2°36′24″W	Category B	9517	Upload Photo
Old Dess Bridge Over Dess Burn				57°05′16″N 2°42′41″W	Category C(S)	9540	Upload Photo
Westerton Farmhouse				57°05′36″N 2°41′54″W	Category C(S)	9543	Upload Photo
Kincardine House				57°05′23″N 2°39′33″W	Category B	9546	Upload Photo
9 North Turnpike (Part Of Gordon Arms Hotel), Kincardine O'Neil				57°05′11″N 2°40′30″W	Category C(S)	9571	Upload Photo
Manse Of Kincardine O'Neil				57°05′10″N 2°40′21″W	Category B	9576	Upload Photo
Learney House, Including Terraces				57°07′52″N 2°36′29″W	Category B	9516	Upload Photo
Kincardine O'Neil, 32 North Deeside Road, Former Morrice School Including Boundary Wall				57°05′10″N 2°40′27″W	Category C(S)	9536	Upload Photo
Dess House				57°05′23″N 2°42′13″W	Category B	9541	Upload Photo
Learney Arms Hotel, Torphins				57°06′19″N 2°37′20″W	Category B	9549	Upload Photo
Craigmyle House, South Lodge				57°05′59″N 2°35′58″W	Category C(S)	9555	Upload Photo
Fereneze, Kincardine O'Neil				57°05′11″N 2°40′36″W	Category C(S)	9560	Upload Photo
62 North Deeside Rd (Formerly 3 North Turnpike) Kincardine O'Neil				57°05′12″N 2°40′37″W	Category B	9567	Upload Photo
Gordon Arms Hotel, Kincardine O'Neil				57°05′11″N 2°40′31″W	Category C(S)	9572	Upload another image See more images
Franorst, (Formerly 10, 11, 12 North Turnpike) Kincardine O'Neil				57°05′11″N 2°40′27″W	Category B	9574	Upload Photo
Old Tollhouse, Drumlasie				57°08′25″N 2°35′31″W	Category C(S)	9522	Upload Photo
G. Taylor, Millwright And Joiner, Drumlasie				57°08′24″N 2°35′34″W	Category C(S)	9523	Upload Photo
Dess House Lodge				57°05′23″N 2°41′50″W	Category C(S)	9542	Upload Photo
Kincardine House, Stableblock				57°05′17″N 2°39′23″W	Category C(S)	9545	Upload Photo
Torphins South Church				57°06′17″N 2°37′22″W	Category B	9547	Upload Photo
Bridge Over Beltie Burn Near Craigour				57°05′43″N 2°36′10″W	Category C(S)	9550	Upload Photo
Craigmyle House, West Lodge And Gates				57°06′25″N 2°36′34″W	Category B	9554	Upload Photo
Brussels Cottage, Kincardine O'Neil				57°05′11″N 2°40′37″W	Category C(S)	9561	Upload Photo
The Rectory, Kincardine O'Neil				57°05′13″N 2°40′41″W	Category C(S)	9564	Upload Photo
Kincardine O'Neil, 36 North Deeside Road, Old Schoolhouse And Former Reading Room Including Boundary Walls And Gates				57°05′11″N 2°40′28″W	Category C(S)	9573	Upload Photo
27 North Deeside Rd (Formerly 2, 3 South Turnpike) Kincardine O'Neil				57°05′10″N 2°40′31″W	Category B	9580	Upload Photo
Torphins, 70 Beltie Road, The Firs				57°06′35″N 2°38′01″W	Category C(S)	49865	Upload Photo
Torphins, William Street, Woodcote				57°06′17″N 2°37′03″W	Category C(S)	49866	Upload Photo
Mill Of Learney Near Pitmedden				57°06′59″N 2°36′37″W	Category B	9515	Upload Photo
Milltown Of Craigmyle, Steading				57°06′22″N 2°36′43″W	Category C(S)	9553	Upload Photo
Garage House, Kincardine O'Neil				57°05′11″N 2°40′34″W	Category C(S)	9559	Upload Photo
Christ Church Episcopal Church, Kincardine O'Neil				57°05′13″N 2°40′43″W	Category C(S)	9563	Upload Photo
Kincardine O'Neil Old Churchyard				57°05′09″N 2°40′29″W	Category C(S)	9577	Upload Photo
35, 37 North Deeside (Formerly 6, 7 South Turnpike) Kincardine O'Neil				57°05′11″N 2°40′33″W	Category B	9582	Upload Photo
39 North Deeside (Formerly 8 South Turnpike)				57°05′11″N 2°40′33″W	Category B	9583	Upload Photo
Kincardine House Lodge				57°05′07″N 2°40′17″W	Category C(S)	9537	Upload Photo
Hillhead, Cochran's Croft				57°05′05″N 2°40′10″W	Category C(S)	9539	Upload Photo
South Bridge Over Learney Burn Near Craigour				57°05′44″N 2°36′08″W	Category C(S)	9552	Upload Photo
Former Free Church, Greystones, Craigmyle				57°06′07″N 2°36′17″W	Category C(S)	9557	Upload Photo
64 North Deeside Rd. (Formerly 2 North Turnpike) Kincardine O'Neil				57°05′12″N 2°40′37″W	Category C(S)	9566	Upload Photo
Saint Erchan's Well, Kincardine O'Neil				57°05′13″N 2°40′16″W	Category B	9578	Upload Photo
1 Dee Road (Formerly 1 South Turnpike) Kincardine O'Neil				57°05′10″N 2°40′30″W	Category C(S)	9579	Upload Photo
Torphins Church				57°06′30″N 2°37′10″W	Category B	9548	Upload Photo
Bartlemoor, Kincardine O'Neil				57°05′12″N 2°40′45″W	Category C(S)	9562	Upload Photo

== Key ==
The scheme for classifying buildings in Scotland is:

- Category A: "buildings of national or international importance, either architectural or historic; or fine, little-altered examples of some particular period, style or building type."
- Category B: "buildings of regional or more than local importance; or major examples of some particular period, style or building type, which may have been altered."
- Category C: "buildings of local importance; lesser examples of any period, style, or building type, as originally constructed or moderately altered; and simple traditional buildings which group well with other listed buildings."

In March 2016 there were 47,288 listed buildings in Scotland. Of these, 8% were Category A, and 50% were Category B, with the remaining 42% being Category C.

== See also ==
- List of listed buildings in Aberdeenshire
