= List of listed buildings in Durris =

This is a list of listed buildings in the parish of Durris in Aberdeenshire, Scotland.

== List ==
| Name | Location | Date Listed | Grid Ref. (Note: Sometimes known as OSGB36, the grid reference (where provided) is based on the British national grid reference system used by the Ordnance Survey. • "Guide to National Grid". Ordnance Survey. • "Get-a-map". Ordnance Survey.) | Geo-coordinates | Notes | LB Number (Note: Historic Environment Scotland assign a unique alphanumeric identifier to each designated site in Scotland, for listed buildings this always begins with "LB", for example "LB12345".) | Image |
|---|---|---|---|---|---|---|---|
| 2 And 3, Kirkton Of Durris | | | | 57°03′23″N 2°22′35″W | Category C(S) | 2972 | Upload Photo |
| Old Bridge Of Durris Over Burn Of Sheeoch | | | | 57°03′17″N 2°22′37″W | Category B | 2974 | Upload Photo |
| Durris House, East Lodge | | | | 57°04′01″N 2°19′39″W | Category B | 2978 | Upload Photo |
| Durris House - Nursery Cottage | | | | 57°03′31″N 2°19′59″W | Category C(S) | 2979 | Upload Photo |
| Keith's Tower | | | | 57°04′26″N 2°20′06″W | Category B | 2980 | Upload Photo |
| Parish Kirk Manse, Now "Glebe House" | | | | 57°03′29″N 2°22′40″W | Category B | 2986 | Upload Photo |
| Parish Kirkyard - Fraser Burial Aisle | | | | 57°03′33″N 2°22′37″W | Category B | 2985 | Upload Photo |
| Bridge Of Blairdryne Over Burn Of Sheeoch | | | | 57°01′30″N 2°24′51″W | Category B | 2982 | Upload Photo |
| Durris Parish Kirk | | | | 57°03′33″N 2°22′38″W | Category C(S) | 2984 | Upload Photo |
| Dhault Hall | | | | 57°01′32″N 2°25′17″W | Category C(S) | 2983 | Upload Photo |
| 7 Kirkton Of Durris | | | | 57°03′22″N 2°22′34″W | Category C(S) | 2973 | Upload Photo |
| Mill Of Durris | | | | 57°03′15″N 2°22′39″W | Category B | 2975 | Upload Photo |
| Durris House - Stables | | | | 57°03′43″N 2°19′55″W | Category B | 2977 | Upload Photo |
| Belladrum Bridge Over Burn Of Sheeoch | | | | 57°02′15″N 2°23′29″W | Category C(S) | 2981 | Upload Photo |
| Durris House | | | | 57°03′44″N 2°20′04″W | Category B | 2976 | Upload Photo |

== Key ==
The scheme for classifying buildings in Scotland is:

- Category A: "buildings of national or international importance, either architectural or historic; or fine, little-altered examples of some particular period, style or building type."
- Category B: "buildings of regional or more than local importance; or major examples of some particular period, style or building type, which may have been altered."
- Category C: "buildings of local importance; lesser examples of any period, style, or building type, as originally constructed or moderately altered; and simple traditional buildings which group well with other listed buildings."

In March 2016 there were 47,288 listed buildings in Scotland. Of these, 8% were Category A, and 50% were Category B, with the remaining 42% being Category C.

== See also ==
- List of listed buildings in Aberdeenshire
