= List of listed buildings in Clatt =

This is a list of listed buildings in the parish of Clatt in Aberdeenshire, Scotland.

== List ==
Name	Location	Date listed	Geo-coordinates	Notes	Category	LB number	Image
Kirktown Of Clatt, Clatt Glebe Steading			57°19′18″N 2°46′12″W		B	6374	Upload Photo
Tower Lodge Knockespock			57°18′47″N 2°44′05″W		B	2912	Upload Photo
Kirktown Of Clatt, Manse And Walled Garden			57°19′19″N 2°46′09″W		B	6373	Upload Photo
Clatt Parish Church Kirktown Of Clatt			57°19′20″N 2°46′04″W		B	2910	Upload Photo
Mill Of Clatt, Miller's Cottage, And Byre, Kirktown Of Clatt			57°19′17″N 2°45′56″W		C(S)	2913	Upload Photo
Knockespock House			57°18′18″N 2°45′27″W		B	2911	Upload Photo

== Key ==
The scheme for classifying buildings in Scotland is:

- Category A: "buildings of national or international importance, either architectural or historic; or fine, little-altered examples of some particular period, style or building type."
- Category B: "buildings of regional or more than local importance; or major examples of some particular period, style or building type, which may have been altered."
- Category C: "buildings of local importance; lesser examples of any period, style, or building type, as originally constructed or moderately altered; and simple traditional buildings which group well with other listed buildings."

In March 2016 there were 47,288 listed buildings in Scotland. Of these, 8% were Category A, and 50% were Category B, with the remaining 42% being Category C.

== See also ==
- List of listed buildings in Aberdeenshire
