= List of listed buildings in Echt, Aberdeenshire =

This is a list of listed buildings in the parish of Echt in Aberdeenshire, Scotland.

== List ==
Name	Location	Date Listed	Grid Ref. (Note: Sometimes known as OSGB36, the grid reference (where provided) is based on the British national grid reference system used by the Ordnance Survey. • "Guide to National Grid". Ordnance Survey. • "Get-a-map". Ordnance Survey.)	Geo-coordinates	Notes	LB Number (Note: Historic Environment Scotland assign a unique alphanumeric identifier to each designated site in Scotland, for listed buildings this always begins with "LB", for example "LB12345".)	Image
Main Gate To Dunecht Policies Dunecht Village				57°10′17″N 2°24′26″W	Category B	3130	Upload Photo
South Lodge Dunecht Policies				57°09′14″N 2°24′43″W	Category B	3132	Upload Photo
Gazebo				57°09′35″N 2°24′43″W	Category B	3136	Upload Photo
Sphinxes, West Steps				57°09′40″N 2°24′51″W	Category B	3137	Upload Photo
Housedale And Walled Garden				57°09′55″N 2°24′30″W	Category C(S)	3141	Upload Photo
Waterton Farm				57°10′19″N 2°24′35″W	Category C(S)	3145	Upload Photo
The Terrace, Echt, (Craigendarroch, Craigendiui, Cairnshiel, Clochwaben, Craiglarach, Eden)				57°08′30″N 2°26′06″W	Category C(S)	3155	Upload Photo
Greentree Lodge				57°08′26″N 2°26′57″W	Category B	3158	Upload Photo
Kinnernie Toll House				57°10′38″N 2°27′11″W	Category B	3161	Upload Photo
The Terrace (See Paper List For Full List Of Properties)				57°10′21″N 2°24′42″W	Category C(S)	43	Upload Photo
Bridgend				57°10′19″N 2°24′26″W	Category C(S)	3148	Upload Photo
Mill Of Echt				57°08′11″N 2°26′06″W	Category B	3159	Upload Photo
West Lodges. Dunecht Estate				57°09′45″N 2°25′43″W	Category B	3162	Upload Photo
Dunecht House, Garages And Flats (Former Stableblock)				57°09′43″N 2°24′34″W	Category B	42	Upload Photo
The Neuk And Auchendryne, Echt				57°08′30″N 2°26′01″W	Category C(S)	48774	Upload Photo
Cross, S. Lawn				57°09′36″N 2°24′46″W	Category B	3135	Upload Photo
Urns, Terrace Of W. Lawn				57°09′39″N 2°24′54″W	Category B	3138	Upload Photo
Estate Office And Hall				57°10′22″N 2°24′50″W	Category B	3144	Upload Photo
Gordon Sim (Post Office)				57°10′19″N 2°24′33″W	Category C(S)	3146	Upload Photo
Templefold				57°07′09″N 2°22′43″W	Category C(S)	3150	Upload Photo
Sandyhillock Rifle Range, Building At 400 Yard Marker				57°07′50″N 2°26′13″W	Category C(S)	3151	Upload Photo
Echt Parish Church				57°08′28″N 2°25′58″W	Category A	3152	Upload another image See more images
Dunecht Garage				57°10′20″N 2°24′37″W	Category C(S)	148	Upload Photo
Engineer's House Dunecht Policies,				57°09′39″N 2°24′21″W	Category B	3139	Upload Photo
Doric Columns, Loch Skene At Boathouse Wood				57°09′18″N 2°21′46″W	Category B	3149	Upload Photo
Monecht House (Former Free Church Manse)				57°08′30″N 2°25′16″W	Category C(S)	3160	Upload Photo
Lochside				57°09′18″N 2°22′28″W	Category C(S)	149	Upload Photo
Manse Of Echt Including Front Wall And Gatepiers				57°08′18″N 2°25′56″W	Category B	41	Upload Photo
North Lodges Dunecht Policies				57°10′10″N 2°24′18″W	Category B	3131	Upload Photo
Dunecht House				57°09′39″N 2°24′49″W	Category A	3133	Upload Photo
Dunecht Lodge Dunecht Policies				57°09′55″N 2°24′02″W	Category B	3140	Upload Photo
Home Farm Dovecot				57°09′50″N 2°24′27″W	Category B	3142	Upload Photo
Old Echt. Steading, Orchard Wall And East Forecourt Wall				57°08′34″N 2°26′29″W	Category B	3156	Upload Photo
Works Yard, Dunecht Village				57°10′23″N 2°24′52″W	Category C(S)	3143	Upload Photo
Echt Parish Churchyard				57°08′27″N 2°25′56″W	Category B	3153	Upload another image See more images
Toll House, Old Echt				57°08′28″N 2°26′32″W	Category B	3157	Upload another image See more images
Fountains. S. Of House				57°09′37″N 2°24′48″W	Category B	3134	Upload Photo
Jasmine Villa				57°10′19″N 2°24′31″W	Category C(S)	3147	Upload Photo

== Key ==
The scheme for classifying buildings in Scotland is:

- Category A: "buildings of national or international importance, either architectural or historic; or fine, little-altered examples of some particular period, style or building type."
- Category B: "buildings of regional or more than local importance; or major examples of some particular period, style or building type, which may have been altered."
- Category C: "buildings of local importance; lesser examples of any period, style, or building type, as originally constructed or moderately altered; and simple traditional buildings which group well with other listed buildings."

In March 2016 there were 47,288 listed buildings in Scotland. Of these, 8% were Category A, and 50% were Category B, with the remaining 42% being Category C.

== See also ==
- List of listed buildings in Aberdeenshire
