= List of listed buildings in Gamrie, Aberdeenshire =

This is a list of listed buildings in the parish of Gamrie in Aberdeenshire, Scotland.

== List ==
Name	Location	Date Listed	Grid Ref. (Note: Sometimes known as OSGB36, the grid reference (where provided) is based on the British national grid reference system used by the Ordnance Survey. • "Guide to National Grid". Ordnance Survey. • "Get-a-map". Ordnance Survey.)	Geo-coordinates	Notes	LB Number (Note: Historic Environment Scotland assign a unique alphanumeric identifier to each designated site in Scotland, for listed buildings this always begins with "LB", for example "LB12345".)	Image
Northfield Farm, Windmill Stump				57°41′04″N 2°17′57″W	Category B	10582	Upload Photo
Troup Home Farm, Kiln Barn And Cart Shed				57°40′51″N 2°16′59″W	Category A	10585	Upload Photo
56 Crovie				57°40′52″N 2°19′29″W	Category C(S)	10606	Upload Photo
61, 62 Crovie				57°40′53″N 2°19′29″W	Category B	10609	Upload Photo
Crovie Pier And Promenade				57°40′45″N 2°19′30″W	Category B	10536	Upload Photo
49 Crovie				57°40′50″N 2°19′28″W	Category B	10542	Upload Photo
51 Crovie				57°40′50″N 2°19′28″W	Category C(S)	10544	Upload Photo
23 Crovie				57°40′44″N 2°19′27″W	Category C(S)	10555	Upload Photo
24 Crovie				57°40′45″N 2°19′27″W	Category B	10556	Upload Photo
Telephone Kiosk By 27 Crovie				57°40′46″N 2°19′26″W	Category B	10559	Upload Photo
34 Crovie				57°40′47″N 2°19′27″W	Category B	10562	Upload Photo
40 Crovie				57°40′48″N 2°19′27″W	Category B	10566	Upload Photo
Troup House				57°40′54″N 2°17′16″W	Category B	10584	Upload Photo
53, 54 Crovie				57°40′51″N 2°19′28″W	Category C(S)	10605	Upload Photo
58 Crovie And Store				57°40′53″N 2°19′29″W	Category B	10608	Upload Photo
63 Crovie				57°40′53″N 2°19′30″W	Category C(S)	10610	Upload Photo
64 Crovie				57°40′54″N 2°19′30″W	Category B	10611	Upload Photo
10 Crovie				57°40′42″N 2°19′28″W	Category C(S)	10546	Upload Photo
16 Crovie Fiesimm Cottage				57°40′43″N 2°19′27″W	Category C(S)	10551	Upload Photo
31 Crovie				57°40′47″N 2°19′26″W	Category B	10560	Upload Photo
66 Crovie				57°40′55″N 2°19′30″W	Category C(S)	10572	Upload Photo
Gamrie Parish Church (Church Of Scotland) And Burial Ground				57°39′14″N 2°20′55″W	Category B	10574	Upload Photo
21 Crovie				57°40′44″N 2°19′27″W	Category B	13354	Upload Photo
65 Crovie				57°40′54″N 2°19′30″W	Category C(S)	10612	Upload Photo
48 Crovie				57°40′49″N 2°19′28″W	Category C(S)	10541	Upload Photo
50 Crovie				57°40′50″N 2°19′28″W	Category B	10543	Upload Photo
52 Crovie				57°40′50″N 2°19′28″W	Category B	10545	Upload Photo
12 Crovie				57°40′42″N 2°19′28″W	Category B	10548	Upload Photo
13 Crovie				57°40′43″N 2°19′28″W	Category B	10549	Upload Photo
18 Crovie				57°40′43″N 2°19′27″W	Category B	10553	Upload Photo
27 Crovie				57°40′46″N 2°19′26″W	Category B	10558	Upload Photo
33 Crovie				57°40′47″N 2°19′26″W	Category B	10561	Upload Photo
36 Crovie				57°40′47″N 2°19′27″W	Category B	10564	Upload Photo
47 Crovie				57°40′49″N 2°19′28″W	Category B	10571	Upload Photo
Greenskares, Cottage Farm				57°39′36″N 2°21′34″W	Category B	10577	Upload Photo
Mains Of Melrose				57°40′04″N 2°25′47″W	Category C(S)	10578	Upload Photo
64 Crovie, Crovie Hall				57°40′55″N 2°19′30″W	Category B	10613	Upload Photo
5 Crovie				57°40′41″N 2°19′29″W	Category B	10539	Upload Photo
17 Crovie				57°40′43″N 2°19′28″W	Category C(S)	10552	Upload Photo
44 Crovie				57°40′49″N 2°19′28″W	Category B	10569	Upload Photo
Gamrie Lodge (Former Church Of Scotland Manse), Walled Garden And Steading				57°39′06″N 2°21′02″W	Category B	10573	Upload Photo
Gardenstown, Main Street, Garden Arms Hotel				57°40′16″N 2°20′21″W	Category B	10576	Upload Photo
Tarlair Swimming Pool Including Boating Pool, Paddling Pool, Tea Pavilion, Changing Rooms, Kiosks And Fence				57°40′15″N 2°28′16″W	Category A	50788	Upload Photo
38 Crovie				57°40′48″N 2°19′27″W	Category B	13462	Upload Photo
20 Crovie				57°40′44″N 2°19′27″W	Category C(S)	13353	Upload Photo
6 Crovie				57°40′41″N 2°19′29″W	Category C(S)	10540	Upload Photo
11 Crovie				57°40′42″N 2°19′28″W	Category B	10547	Upload Photo
43 Crovie				57°40′48″N 2°19′28″W	Category C(S)	10568	Upload Photo
7 Crovie				57°40′41″N 2°19′29″W	Category B	10592	Upload Photo
4 Crovie				57°40′41″N 2°19′29″W	Category C(S)	10538	Upload Photo
22 Crovie				57°40′44″N 2°19′27″W	Category B	10554	Upload Photo
42 Crovie				57°40′48″N 2°19′27″W	Category B	10567	Upload Photo
Gardenstown, Harbour Road, East Warehouse				57°40′22″N 2°20′13″W	Category B	10575	Upload Photo
Mill Of Melrose, Bridge Over Burn Of Melrose				57°40′00″N 2°26′28″W	Category C(S)	10579	Upload Photo
Gardenstown, Harbour Road, West Warehouse				57°40′22″N 2°20′15″W	Category B	6758	Upload Photo
Montbletton Farm, Windmill Stump				57°38′20″N 2°28′08″W	Category B	10581	Upload Photo
9 Crovie				57°40′41″N 2°19′28″W	Category B	10593	Upload Photo
57 Crovie				57°40′52″N 2°19′29″W	Category B	10607	Upload Photo
25 Crovie				57°40′44″N 2°19′24″W	Category B	10557	Upload Photo
39 Crovie				57°40′48″N 2°19′28″W	Category B	10565	Upload Photo
45 Crovie				57°40′49″N 2°19′27″W	Category B	10570	Upload Photo
St John's Church And Burial Ground				57°40′10″N 2°21′07″W	Category B	10583	Upload Photo
1 Crovie				57°40′41″N 2°19′29″W	Category B	10537	Upload Photo
14 Crovie				57°40′42″N 2°19′28″W	Category B	10550	Upload Photo
35 Crovie				57°40′47″N 2°19′27″W	Category B	10563	Upload Photo
Minnonie Farmhouse				57°37′53″N 2°22′23″W	Category C(S)	10580	Upload Photo

== Key ==
The scheme for classifying buildings in Scotland is:

- Category A: "buildings of national or international importance, either architectural or historic; or fine, little-altered examples of some particular period, style or building type."
- Category B: "buildings of regional or more than local importance; or major examples of some particular period, style or building type, which may have been altered."
- Category C: "buildings of local importance; lesser examples of any period, style, or building type, as originally constructed or moderately altered; and simple traditional buildings which group well with other listed buildings."

In March 2016 there were 47,288 listed buildings in Scotland. Of these, 8% were Category A, and 50% were Category B, with the remaining 42% being Category C.

== See also ==
- List of listed buildings in Aberdeenshire
