= List of listed buildings in Aberdeenshire =

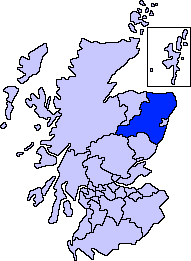
Aberdeenshire shown within Scotland

This is a list of listed buildings in Aberdeenshire. The list is split out by parish.

- List of listed buildings in Aberchirder, Aberdeenshire
- List of listed buildings in Aberdour, Aberdeenshire
- List of listed buildings in Aboyne and Glen Tanar, Aberdeenshire
- List of listed buildings in Alford, Aberdeenshire
- List of listed buildings in Alvah, Aberdeenshire
- List of listed buildings in Arbuthnott, Aberdeenshire
- List of listed buildings in Auchindoir and Kearn, Aberdeenshire
- List of listed buildings in Auchterless, Aberdeenshire
- List of listed buildings in Ballater, Aberdeenshire
- List of listed buildings in Banchory, Aberdeenshire
- List of listed buildings in Banchory-Devenick, Aberdeenshire
- List of listed buildings in Banchory-Ternan, Aberdeenshire
- List of listed buildings in Banff, Aberdeenshire
- List of listed buildings in Belhelvie, Aberdeenshire
- List of listed buildings in Benholm, Aberdeenshire
- List of listed buildings in Bervie, Aberdeenshire
- List of listed buildings in Birse, Aberdeenshire
- List of listed buildings in Bourtie, Aberdeenshire
- List of listed buildings in Boyndie, Aberdeenshire
- List of listed buildings in Cairnie, Aberdeenshire
- List of listed buildings in Chapel of Garioch, Aberdeenshire
- List of listed buildings in Clatt, Aberdeenshire
- List of listed buildings in Cluny, Aberdeenshire
- List of listed buildings in Coull, Aberdeenshire
- List of listed buildings in Crathie and Braemar, Aberdeenshire
- List of listed buildings in Crimond, Aberdeenshire
- List of listed buildings in Cruden, Aberdeenshire
- List of listed buildings in Culsalmond, Aberdeenshire
- List of listed buildings in Daviot, Aberdeenshire
- List of listed buildings in Drumblade, Aberdeenshire
- List of listed buildings in Drumoak, Aberdeenshire
- List of listed buildings in Dunnottar, Aberdeenshire
- List of listed buildings in Durris, Aberdeenshire
- List of listed buildings in Echt, Aberdeenshire
- List of listed buildings in Ellon, Aberdeenshire
- List of listed buildings in Fettercairn, Aberdeenshire
- List of listed buildings in Fetteresso, Aberdeenshire
- List of listed buildings in Fintray, Aberdeenshire
- List of listed buildings in Fordoun, Aberdeenshire
- List of listed buildings in Fordyce, Aberdeenshire
- List of listed buildings in Forglen, Aberdeenshire
- List of listed buildings in Forgue, Aberdeenshire
- List of listed buildings in Foveran, Aberdeenshire
- List of listed buildings in Fraserburgh, Aberdeenshire
- List of listed buildings in Fyvie, Aberdeenshire
- List of listed buildings in Gamrie, Aberdeenshire
- List of listed buildings in Gartly, Aberdeenshire
- List of listed buildings in Garvock, Aberdeenshire
- List of listed buildings in Glass, Aberdeenshire
- List of listed buildings in Glenbervie, Aberdeenshire
- List of listed buildings in Glenbuchat, Aberdeenshire
- List of listed buildings in Glenmuick, Tullich and Glengairn, Aberdeenshire
- List of listed buildings in Huntly, Aberdeenshire
- List of listed buildings in Insch, Aberdeenshire
- List of listed buildings in Inverbervie, Aberdeenshire
- List of listed buildings in Inverkeithny, Aberdeenshire
- List of listed buildings in Inverurie, Aberdeenshire
- List of listed buildings in Keig, Aberdeenshire
- List of listed buildings in Keithhall and Kinkell, Aberdeenshire
- List of listed buildings in Kemnay, Aberdeenshire
- List of listed buildings in Kennethmont, Aberdeenshire
- List of listed buildings in Kildrummy, Aberdeenshire
- List of listed buildings in Kincardine O'Neil, Aberdeenshire
- List of listed buildings in Kinellar, Aberdeenshire
- List of listed buildings in King Edward, Aberdeenshire
- List of listed buildings in Kinneff and Catterline, Aberdeenshire
- List of listed buildings in Kintore, Aberdeenshire
- List of listed buildings in Laurencekirk, Aberdeenshire
- List of listed buildings in Leochel-Cushnie, Aberdeenshire
- List of listed buildings in Leslie, Aberdeenshire
- List of listed buildings in Logie Buchan, Aberdeenshire
- List of listed buildings in Logie-Coldstone, Aberdeenshire
- List of listed buildings in Longside, Aberdeenshire
- List of listed buildings in Lonmay, Aberdeenshire
- List of listed buildings in Lumphanan, Aberdeenshire
- List of listed buildings in Macduff, Aberdeenshire
- List of listed buildings in Marnoch, Aberdeenshire
- List of listed buildings in Maryculter, Aberdeenshire
- List of listed buildings in Marykirk, Aberdeenshire
- List of listed buildings in Meldrum, Aberdeenshire
- List of listed buildings in Methlick, Aberdeenshire
- List of listed buildings in Midmar, Aberdeenshire
- List of listed buildings in Monquhitter, Aberdeenshire
- List of listed buildings in Monymusk, Aberdeenshire
- List of listed buildings in New Deer, Aberdeenshire
- List of listed buildings in New Machar, Aberdeenshire
- List of listed buildings in Old Deer, Aberdeenshire
- List of listed buildings in Old Meldrum, Aberdeenshire
- List of listed buildings in Ordiquhill, Aberdeenshire
- List of listed buildings in Oyne, Aberdeenshire
- List of listed buildings in Peterhead, Aberdeenshire
- List of listed buildings in Pitsligo, Aberdeenshire
- List of listed buildings in Portsoy, Aberdeenshire
- List of listed buildings in Premney, Aberdeenshire
- List of listed buildings in Rathen, Aberdeenshire
- List of listed buildings in Rayne, Aberdeenshire
- List of listed buildings in Rhynie, Aberdeenshire
- List of listed buildings in Rosehearty, Aberdeenshire
- List of listed buildings in Skene, Aberdeenshire
- List of listed buildings in Slains, Aberdeenshire
- List of listed buildings in St Cyrus, Aberdeenshire
- List of listed buildings in St Fergus, Aberdeenshire
- List of listed buildings in Stonehaven, Aberdeenshire
- List of listed buildings in Strachan, Aberdeenshire
- List of listed buildings in Strathdon, Aberdeenshire
- List of listed buildings in Strichen, Aberdeenshire
- List of listed buildings in Tarland, Aberdeenshire
- List of listed buildings in Tarves, Aberdeenshire
- List of listed buildings in Tough, Aberdeenshire
- List of listed buildings in Towie, Aberdeenshire
- List of listed buildings in Tullynessle and Forbes, Aberdeenshire
- List of listed buildings in Turriff, Aberdeenshire
- List of listed buildings in Tyrie, Aberdeenshire
- List of listed buildings in Udny, Aberdeenshire

== See also ==
- Scheduled monuments in Aberdeenshire
