= List of listed buildings in Forglen, Aberdeenshire =

This is a list of listed buildings in the parish of Forglen in Aberdeenshire, Scotland.

== List ==
| Name | Location | Date Listed | Grid Ref. (Note: Sometimes known as OSGB36, the grid reference (where provided) is based on the British national grid reference system used by the Ordnance Survey. • "Guide to National Grid". Ordnance Survey. • "Get-a-map". Ordnance Survey.) | Geo-coordinates | Notes | LB Number (Note: Historic Environment Scotland assign a unique alphanumeric identifier to each designated site in Scotland, for listed buildings this always begins with "LB", for example "LB12345".) | Image |
|---|---|---|---|---|---|---|---|
| Forglen, Eastside Lodge With Gatepiers And Gates | | | | 57°32′26″N 2°29′15″W | Category B | 13600 | Upload Photo |
| Forglen Mausoleum, With Boundary Retaining Walls, Railings, Gates And Gatepiers | | | | 57°32′56″N 2°30′19″W | Category B | 13606 | Upload Photo |
| Forglen, Walled Garden | | | | 57°33′29″N 2°30′26″W | Category C(S) | 13609 | Upload Photo |
| Forglen, Westwood | | | | 57°33′23″N 2°31′35″W | Category C(S) | 13611 | Upload Photo |
| Old Church, Forglen, With Walled Graveyard, Gatepiers And Gates | | | | 57°32′18″N 2°30′28″W | Category B | 12875 | Upload Photo |
| Forglen, Coachhouse And Stables | | | | 57°33′13″N 2°30′10″W | Category B | 13597 | Upload Photo |
| Forglen, Dovecot | | | | 57°33′16″N 2°30′32″W | Category B | 13599 | Upload Photo |
| Forglen House | | | | 57°33′21″N 2°30′18″W | Category A | 13603 | Upload Photo |
| Forglen, Ice House | | | | 57°33′34″N 2°30′30″W | Category C(S) | 13604 | Upload Photo |
| Forglen, North Lodge, Gatepiers And Quadrant Walls | | | | 57°33′42″N 2°30′17″W | Category B | 13608 | Upload Photo |
| Forglen, Walled Garden Cottage | | | | 57°33′32″N 2°30′30″W | Category C(S) | 13610 | Upload Photo |
| Carnousie, Auldtown Of Carnousie | | | | 57°32′21″N 2°34′19″W | Category B | 9600 | Upload Photo |
| Forglen Memorial Hall And War Memorial | | | | 57°33′21″N 2°31′53″W | Category C(S) | 13607 | Upload Photo |
| Carnousie, Waterside, West Cottage | | | | 57°31′58″N 2°32′48″W | Category C(S) | 9608 | Upload Photo |
| Carnousie, Waterside, East Cottage | | | | 57°31′59″N 2°32′47″W | Category B | 9607 | Upload Photo |
| Forglen, Crossbrae | | | | 57°33′40″N 2°30′42″W | Category C(S) | 13598 | Upload Photo |
| Forglen Home Farm | | | | 57°33′17″N 2°30′38″W | Category B | 13602 | Upload Photo |
| Manse Of Forglen Kirklands With Outbuildings And Walled Garden | | | | 57°32′21″N 2°30′31″W | Category B | 12873 | Upload Photo |
| Forglen, The Kennels | | | | 57°33′01″N 2°30′27″W | Category C(S) | 13605 | Upload Photo |
| Carnousie, Mill Of Carnousie | | | | 57°32′24″N 2°33′58″W | Category C(S) | 9603 | Upload Photo |
| Carnousie, Mains Of Carnousie | | | | 57°32′33″N 2°32′59″W | Category B | 9601 | Upload Photo |
| Forglen, Garden Cottage | | | | 57°33′31″N 2°30′35″W | Category C(S) | 13601 | Upload Photo |
| Mill Of Ribrae | | | | 57°33′11″N 2°32′00″W | Category B | 12874 | Upload Photo |
| United Free Manse | | | | 57°33′16″N 2°33′24″W | Category C(S) | 12878 | Upload Photo |
| Carnousie, North Lodge And Gatepiers | | | | 57°32′56″N 2°32′52″W | Category C(S) | 9604 | Upload Photo |
| Carnousie, Woodhead | | | | 57°31′53″N 2°33′15″W | Category C(S) | 9609 | Upload Photo |
| Eastside Bridge | | | | 57°32′32″N 2°28′45″W | Category B | 9610 | Upload Photo |
| United Free Church | | | | 57°33′17″N 2°33′23″W | Category C(S) | 12877 | Upload Photo |
| Mains Of Carnousie - Steading | | | | 57°32′35″N 2°33′09″W | Category B | 9602 | Upload Photo |
| Carnousie, Red Loge And Gatepiers | | | | 57°31′59″N 2°33′12″W | Category C(S) | 9605 | Upload Photo |
| Carnousie, Walled Garden With Pavilions | | | | 57°32′08″N 2°32′49″W | Category B | 9606 | Upload Photo |

== Key ==
The scheme for classifying buildings in Scotland is:

- Category A: "buildings of national or international importance, either architectural or historic; or fine, little-altered examples of some particular period, style or building type."
- Category B: "buildings of regional or more than local importance; or major examples of some particular period, style or building type, which may have been altered."
- Category C: "buildings of local importance; lesser examples of any period, style, or building type, as originally constructed or moderately altered; and simple traditional buildings which group well with other listed buildings."

In March 2016 there were 47,288 listed buildings in Scotland. Of these, 8% were Category A, and 50% were Category B, with the remaining 42% being Category C.

== See also ==
- List of listed buildings in Aberdeenshire
