= List of listed buildings in Logie-Coldstone, Aberdeenshire =

This is a list of listed buildings in the parish of Logie-Coldstone in Aberdeenshire, Scotland.

== List ==
Name	Location	Date listed	Geo-coordinates	Notes	Category	LB number	Image
Coldstone House, Kirk Hill Including Steading And Walled Garden			57°08′16″N 2°56′31″W		B	9434	Upload Photo
Mill Of Logie			57°06′23″N 2°54′52″W		C(S)	9439	Upload Photo
Hopewell House Including Summer House, Walled Garden, Steading, Boundary Wall And Gate Piers			57°08′17″N 2°54′14″W		C(S)	49498	Upload Photo
Tarland, Corrachree House			57°07′43″N 2°53′15″W		B	9440	Upload Photo
Tigh Geal			57°08′10″N 2°52′44″W		B	49499	Upload Photo
Deskry Water, Boultenstone Bridge			57°11′09″N 2°58′40″W		C(S)	9444	Upload Photo
Logie Churchyard, Kirkton On Galton Farm			57°06′33″N 2°55′54″W		B	9433	Upload Photo
Coldstone Churchyard			57°08′18″N 2°56′22″W		B	9436	Upload Photo
Migvie, Migvie Churchyard			57°08′56″N 2°55′58″W		B	9438	Upload Photo
Logie Coldstone, Newkirk Of Logie Coldstone, Former Logie Coldstone Parish Church			57°07′36″N 2°56′04″W		C(S)	9445	Upload Photo
Migvie, Migvie Church			57°08′56″N 2°55′58″W		B	9437	Upload Photo
Migvie, Former Clashmarket			57°08′47″N 2°54′45″W		B	9442	Upload Photo
Tillypronie, Nether Birkhill			57°09′53″N 2°57′57″W		C(S)	9443	Upload Photo
Cromar, Allalogie Cottage No 1, Including Byre			57°06′44″N 2°56′47″W		C(S)	44929	Upload Photo
Cromar, Allalogie Cottage No 2 Including Byre And Garden Wall			57°06′44″N 2°56′48″W		B	44930	Upload Photo

== Key ==
The scheme for classifying buildings in Scotland is:

- Category A: "buildings of national or international importance, either architectural or historic; or fine, little-altered examples of some particular period, style or building type."
- Category B: "buildings of regional or more than local importance; or major examples of some particular period, style or building type, which may have been altered."
- Category C: "buildings of local importance; lesser examples of any period, style, or building type, as originally constructed or moderately altered; and simple traditional buildings which group well with other listed buildings."

In March 2016 there were 47,288 listed buildings in Scotland. Of these, 8% were Category A, and 50% were Category B, with the remaining 42% being Category C.

== See also ==
- List of listed buildings in Aberdeenshire
