= List of listed buildings in Ordiquhill, Aberdeenshire =

This is a list of listed buildings in the parish of Ordiquhill in Aberdeenshire, Scotland.

== List ==
Name	Location	Date listed	Grid ref. (Note: Sometimes known as OSGB36, the grid reference (where provided) is based on the British national grid reference system used by the Ordnance Survey. • "Guide to National Grid". Ordnance Survey. • "Get-a-map". Ordnance Survey.)	Geo-coordinates	Notes	LB number (Note: Historic Environment Scotland assign a unique alphanumeric identifier to each designated site in Scotland, for listed buildings this always begins with "LB", for example "LB12345".)	Image
Castle of Park (Park House)				57°36′09″N 2°41′22″W	Category A	19597	Upload another image
Park Gate Lodge And Gatepiers				57°36′21″N 2°41′24″W	Category C(S)	19598	Upload Photo
Ordiquhill School And Schoolhouse				57°35′53″N 2°43′39″W	Category C(S)	19596	Upload Photo
Cornhill, Mid Street, Cornhill House With Outbuildings (Former Manse)				57°36′46″N 2°41′34″W	Category C(S)	18783	Upload Photo
Cornhill, Mid Street, Hay Memorial Hall And Warden's Cottage				57°36′42″N 2°41′44″W	Category B	18788	Upload Photo
Cornhill, Mid Street, Gordon Arms Hotel				57°36′42″N 2°41′51″W	Category B	18785	Upload Photo
Park Home Farm				57°36′11″N 2°41′33″W	Category C(S)	19599	Upload Photo
Wetherhill House				57°35′02″N 2°43′33″W	Category B	19600	Upload Photo
Cornhill, 5 And 7 Mid Street				57°36′43″N 2°41′40″W	Category C(S)	18782	Upload Photo
Cornhill, Mid Street, Ordiquhill And Cornhill Parish Church (Church Of Scotland) Church With Retaining Wall And Gatepiers				57°36′46″N 2°41′36″W	Category C(S)	18790	Upload Photo
Cornhill, Police Station, Knockview With Boundary Walls, Gates, Railings And Gatepiers				57°36′39″N 2°41′48″W	Category C(S)	18792	Upload Photo
Cornhill, Victoria Cottage With Retaining Wall And Railings				57°36′38″N 2°41′48″W	Category C(S)	19594	Upload Photo
Ordiquhill Parish Church With Burial Enclosure And Graveyard Walls				57°35′18″N 2°43′48″W	Category B	19595	Upload Photo

== Key ==
The scheme for classifying buildings in Scotland is:

- Category A: "buildings of national or international importance, either architectural or historic; or fine, little-altered examples of some particular period, style or building type."
- Category B: "buildings of regional or more than local importance; or major examples of some particular period, style or building type, which may have been altered."
- Category C: "buildings of local importance; lesser examples of any period, style, or building type, as originally constructed or moderately altered; and simple traditional buildings which group well with other listed buildings."

In March 2016 there were 47,288 listed buildings in Scotland. Of these, 8% were Category A, and 50% were Category B, with the remaining 42% being Category C.

== See also ==
- List of listed buildings in Aberdeenshire
