= List of listed buildings in Slains, Aberdeenshire =

This is a list of listed buildings in the parish of Slains in Aberdeenshire, Scotland.

== List ==
Name	Location	Date Listed	Grid Ref. (Note: Sometimes known as OSGB36, the grid reference (where provided) is based on the British national grid reference system used by the Ordnance Survey. • "Guide to National Grid". Ordnance Survey. • "Get-a-map". Ordnance Survey.)	Geo-coordinates	Notes	LB Number (Note: Historic Environment Scotland assign a unique alphanumeric identifier to each designated site in Scotland, for listed buildings this always begins with "LB", for example "LB12345".)	Image
Erroll Aisle Of Old Parish Church Of Slains				57°21′04″N 1°56′00″W	Category B	16047	Upload Photo
Mains Of Slains Farmhouse				57°21′45″N 1°55′17″W	Category B	16052	Upload Photo
House Of Leask				57°23′17″N 1°57′28″W	Category C(S)	19772	Upload Photo
St. Fidamnans (Or St. Adamnans's) Chapel, Leask				57°23′00″N 1°57′08″W	Category B	16053	Upload Photo
House Of Leask, Doocot				57°23′17″N 1°57′22″W	Category B	16054	Upload Photo
Parish Church Of Slains. Kirktown Of Slains				57°21′04″N 1°56′00″W	Category B	16046	Upload Photo
Manse Of Slains, Offices, Doocot And Gatepiers, Kirktown Of Slains				57°21′02″N 1°56′03″W	Category B	16049	Upload Photo
Churchyard Of Slains				57°21′04″N 1°56′00″W	Category C(S)	16048	Upload Photo
Old Slains Castle				57°21′38″N 1°54′47″W	Category B	16051	Upload Photo
Manse Of Slains				57°21′00″N 1°56′05″W	Category C(S)	16050	Upload Photo

== Key ==
The scheme for classifying buildings in Scotland is:

- Category A: "buildings of national or international importance, either architectural or historic; or fine, little-altered examples of some particular period, style or building type."
- Category B: "buildings of regional or more than local importance; or major examples of some particular period, style or building type, which may have been altered."
- Category C: "buildings of local importance; lesser examples of any period, style, or building type, as originally constructed or moderately altered; and simple traditional buildings which group well with other listed buildings."

In March 2016 there were 47,288 listed buildings in Scotland. Of these, 8% were Category A, and 50% were Category B, with the remaining 42% being Category C.

== See also ==
- List of listed buildings in Aberdeenshire
