= List of listed buildings in Kildrummy, Aberdeenshire =

This is a list of listed buildings in the parish of Kildrummy in Aberdeenshire, Scotland.

== List ==
| Name | Location | Date Listed | Grid Ref. (Note: Sometimes known as OSGB36, the grid reference (where provided) is based on the British national grid reference system used by the Ordnance Survey. • "Guide to National Grid". Ordnance Survey. • "Get-a-map". Ordnance Survey.) | Geo-coordinates | Notes | LB Number (Note: Historic Environment Scotland assign a unique alphanumeric identifier to each designated site in Scotland, for listed buildings this always begins with "LB", for example "LB12345".) | Image |
|---|---|---|---|---|---|---|---|
| Kildrummy Parish Church | | | | 57°14′45″N 2°52′34″W | Category A | 9093 | Upload Photo |
| Old Parish Church (St. Bride's) Ruins | | | | 57°14′44″N 2°52′33″W | Category B | 9094 | Upload Photo |
| Quarryfield | | | | 57°14′52″N 2°54′28″W | Category B | 9097 | Upload Photo |
| Kildrummy Castle Hotel Including Terraces Stairs And Retaining Walls Of Garden | | | | 57°14′06″N 2°54′27″W | Category B | 9099 | Upload Photo |
| Kildrummy Castle Hotel. Bridge Over Back Den | | | | 57°14′09″N 2°54′15″W | Category B | 9100 | Upload Photo |
| Mill Of Kildrummy, Milltown | | | | 57°14′11″N 2°52′47″W | Category B | 9101 | Upload Photo |
| Clova, Stables | | | | 57°17′20″N 2°54′30″W | Category B | 9103 | Upload Photo |
| Clova, Gatepiers On Chapeltown Drive At Bm 718.4 | | | | 57°16′28″N 2°52′33″W | Category C(S) | 9105 | Upload Photo |
| Old Parish Church (St. Bride's) Churchyard | | | | 57°14′44″N 2°52′33″W | Category B | 9095 | Upload Photo |
| Kildrummy Castle | | | | 57°14′06″N 2°54′17″W | Category A | 9098 | Upload Photo |
| Clova House | | | | 57°17′20″N 2°54′18″W | Category B | 9102 | Upload Photo |
| Clova, Steading | | | | 57°17′20″N 2°54′28″W | Category B | 9104 | Upload Photo |
| Former Manse Of Kildrummy | | | | 57°14′47″N 2°52′25″W | Category B | 9096 | Upload Photo |

== Key ==
The scheme for classifying buildings in Scotland is:

- Category A: "buildings of national or international importance, either architectural or historic; or fine, little-altered examples of some particular period, style or building type."
- Category B: "buildings of regional or more than local importance; or major examples of some particular period, style or building type, which may have been altered."
- Category C: "buildings of local importance; lesser examples of any period, style, or building type, as originally constructed or moderately altered; and simple traditional buildings which group well with other listed buildings."

In March 2016 there were 47,288 listed buildings in Scotland. Of these, 8% were Category A, and 50% were Category B, with the remaining 42% being Category C.

== See also ==
- List of listed buildings in Aberdeenshire
