= List of listed buildings in Monymusk, Aberdeenshire =

This is a list of listed buildings in the parish of Monymusk in Aberdeenshire, Scotland.

== List ==
Name	Location	Date Listed	Grid Ref. (Note: Sometimes known as OSGB36, the grid reference (where provided) is based on the British national grid reference system used by the Ordnance Survey. • "Guide to National Grid". Ordnance Survey. • "Get-a-map". Ordnance Survey.)	Geo-coordinates	Notes	LB Number (Note: Historic Environment Scotland assign a unique alphanumeric identifier to each designated site in Scotland, for listed buildings this always begins with "LB", for example "LB12345".)	Image
Library Cottage				57°13′34″N 2°31′31″W	Category C(S)	19767	Upload Photo
Beech Lodge				57°13′34″N 2°31′41″W	Category C(S)	15964	Upload Photo
Monymusk, Braehead, Farmhouse, Steading And Detached Range				57°14′53″N 2°31′41″W	Category B	15966	Upload Photo
1 Monymusk Square				57°13′35″N 2°31′28″W	Category C(S)	15991	Upload Photo
13, 14, 15 Monymusk Square				57°13′38″N 2°31′28″W	Category C(S)	15999	Upload Photo
Old Tollhouse, Tilliefourie				57°12′07″N 2°35′36″W	Category B	15930	Upload Photo
Former Shoe Shop/Bakery Off Monymusk Square (R Harrison)				57°13′35″N 2°31′30″W	Category C(S)	15962	Upload Photo
Kirktown Of Monymusk Mill				57°13′37″N 2°31′44″W	Category C(S)	15965	Upload Photo
Monymusk Parish Church (Augustinian Priory Church Of The Blessed Mary Of Monymusk)				57°13′37″N 2°31′25″W	Category A	15987	Upload Photo
9, 10, 11 Monymusk Square				57°13′37″N 2°31′27″W	Category C(S)	15998	Upload Photo
Grant Lodge Blairdaff				57°14′41″N 2°29′29″W	Category B	15932	Upload Photo
Former Episcopal Church Of Monymusk				57°13′34″N 2°31′27″W	Category C(S)	15960	Upload Photo
Nether Mains Farmhouse				57°13′20″N 2°29′28″W	Category B	15972	Upload Photo
Gatepiers On W. Axis Of Church Between 7 And 8 Monymusk Square				57°13′37″N 2°31′26″W	Category C(S)	15989	Upload Photo
2 Monymusk Square				57°13′35″N 2°31′28″W	Category C(S)	15992	Upload Photo
Former Estate Stables Now Store Of No. 16				57°13′37″N 2°31′30″W	Category C(S)	16000	Upload Photo
5, 6 Monymusk Square				57°13′36″N 2°31′26″W	Category C(S)	19769	Upload Photo
Carriage House To Rear Of 13, 14, 15 Monymusk Square				57°13′38″N 2°31′29″W	Category C(S)	15956	Upload Photo
Grant Arms Hotel				57°13′36″N 2°31′29″W	Category B	15957	Upload another image See more images
7 Monymusk Square				57°13′36″N 2°31′26″W	Category C(S)	15995	Upload Photo
Village Hall, At Rear Of 8-10 Monymusk Square				57°13′37″N 2°31′26″W	Category C(S)	15997	Upload Photo
Blairdaff (Ex-Free) Church				57°14′42″N 2°29′31″W	Category C(S)	15931	Upload Photo
22 Monymusk Square				57°13′36″N 2°31′29″W	Category C(S)	15958	Upload Photo
Manse Of Monymusk				57°13′35″N 2°31′23″W	Category C(S)	15959	Upload Photo
Monymusk House, Main Gates				57°13′42″N 2°31′06″W	Category B	15969	Upload Photo
Monymusk Churchyard				57°13′37″N 2°31′25″W	Category C(S)	15988	Upload Photo
War Memorial, Monymusk Square				57°13′37″N 2°31′28″W	Category C(S)	15990	Upload another image See more images
3 Monymusk Square				57°13′35″N 2°31′27″W	Category C(S)	15993	Upload Photo
Monymusk Post Office And Shop				57°13′36″N 2°31′29″W	Category C(S)	19766	Upload Photo
Milestone Near The South-East Gate To House Of Monymusk				57°13′26″N 2°29′56″W	Category B	15971	Upload Photo
Woodhead House				57°15′11″N 2°32′45″W	Category C(S)	15977	Upload Photo
16, 17 Monymusk Square				57°13′37″N 2°31′29″W	Category C(S)	15955	Upload Photo
23, 24 Monymusk Square				57°13′35″N 2°31′31″W	Category C(S)	15961	Upload Photo
House of Monymusk				57°13′44″N 2°31′01″W	Category A	15967	Upload another image See more images
House Of Monymusk Home Farm				57°13′39″N 2°30′49″W	Category B	15968	Upload Photo
Sir Arthur Grant's School And Schoolhouse				57°14′24″N 2°31′05″W	Category C(S)	15974	Upload Photo
Gloies Farmsteading				57°13′36″N 2°31′34″W	Category B	15963	Upload Photo
Monymusk Toll House				57°13′27″N 2°31′23″W	Category B	15970	Upload Photo
Pitfichie Castle				57°14′22″N 2°32′09″W	Category B	15973	Upload Photo
Mosside Cottage Mosside Of Coullie				57°14′23″N 2°30′37″W	Category C(S)	15975	Upload Photo
Ramstone				57°15′05″N 2°31′52″W	Category C(S)	15976	Upload Photo
4 Monymusk Square				57°13′36″N 2°31′26″W	Category C(S)	15994	Upload Photo
8 Monymusk Square				57°13′37″N 2°31′26″W	Category C(S)	15996	Upload Photo

== Key ==
The scheme for classifying buildings in Scotland is:

- Category A: "buildings of national or international importance, either architectural or historic; or fine, little-altered examples of some particular period, style or building type."
- Category B: "buildings of regional or more than local importance; or major examples of some particular period, style or building type, which may have been altered."
- Category C: "buildings of local importance; lesser examples of any period, style, or building type, as originally constructed or moderately altered; and simple traditional buildings which group well with other listed buildings."

In March 2016 there were 47,288 listed buildings in Scotland. Of these, 8% were Category A, and 50% were Category B, with the remaining 42% being Category C.

== See also ==
- List of listed buildings in Aberdeenshire
