= List of listed buildings in Auchindoir and Kearn =

This is a list of listed buildings in the parish of Auchindoir and Kearn in Aberdeenshire, Scotland.

== List ==
Name	Location	Date listed	Geo-coordinates	Notes	Category	LB number	Image
Druminnor Garden Cottage			57°19′30″N 2°48′41″W		B	2715	Upload Photo
Mill, Milltown Of Auchindoir			57°18′27″N 2°51′58″W		B	2735	Upload Photo
Old Parish Church Of Auchindoir Churchyard			57°18′31″N 2°52′05″W		C(S)	2733	Upload Photo
Kearn Churchyard			57°19′40″N 2°48′29″W		C(S)	2717	Upload Photo
Old Parish Church Of Auchindoir			57°18′31″N 2°52′07″W		A	2732	Upload Photo
Craig Castle			57°18′39″N 2°52′49″W		A	2736	Upload Photo
Druminnor Castle Garden Walls			57°19′32″N 2°48′33″W		C(S)	2714	Upload Photo
Craig Castle Sundial			57°18′39″N 2°52′45″W		B	2738	Upload Photo
Logie Farmhouse, Brux			57°15′12″N 2°49′14″W		B	2741	Upload Photo
Druminnor Castle East Lodge Gatepiers			57°19′39″N 2°48′25″W		B	2716	Upload Photo
Former Manse, Now Lodge Of Auchindoir			57°18′25″N 2°51′51″W		B	2734	Upload Photo
Well, Lumsden			57°17′14″N 2°52′24″W		B	2739	Upload Photo
Druminnor Castle			57°19′32″N 2°48′36″W		A	2743	Upload Photo
Logie, Steading			57°15′13″N 2°49′18″W		C(S)	2742	Upload Photo
Craig Castle Walled Garden			57°18′40″N 2°52′46″W		B	2737	Upload Photo
Mossat Toll House			57°15′49″N 2°52′11″W		B	2740	Upload Photo

== Key ==
The scheme for classifying buildings in Scotland is:

- Category A: "buildings of national or international importance, either architectural or historic; or fine, little-altered examples of some particular period, style or building type."
- Category B: "buildings of regional or more than local importance; or major examples of some particular period, style or building type, which may have been altered."
- Category C: "buildings of local importance; lesser examples of any period, style, or building type, as originally constructed or moderately altered; and simple traditional buildings which group well with other listed buildings."

In March 2016 there were 47,288 listed buildings in Scotland. Of these, 8% were Category A, and 50% were Category B, with the remaining 42% being Category C.

== See also ==
- List of listed buildings in Aberdeenshire
