= List of listed buildings in Benholm =

This is a list of listed buildings in the parish of Benholm in Aberdeenshire, Scotland.

== List ==
Name	Location	Date Listed	Grid Ref. (Note: Sometimes known as OSGB36, the grid reference (where provided) is based on the British national grid reference system used by the Ordnance Survey. • "Guide to National Grid". Ordnance Survey. • "Get-a-map". Ordnance Survey.)	Geo-coordinates	Notes	LB Number (Note: Historic Environment Scotland assign a unique alphanumeric identifier to each designated site in Scotland, for listed buildings this always begins with "LB", for example "LB12345".)	Image
Johnshaven, 24 Main Street				56°47′35″N 2°20′20″W	Category C(S)	6241	Upload Photo
Muirton Farmhouse				56°48′37″N 2°21′41″W	Category B	2809	Upload Photo
Johnshaven, John Street, The Ship				56°47′41″N 2°20′11″W	Category C(S)	6236	Upload Photo
Johnshaven 4 Dock Street				56°47′39″N 2°20′12″W	Category C(S)	6237	Upload Photo
Johnshaven Harbour				56°47′37″N 2°20′12″W	Category C(S)	6239	Upload Photo
Johnshaven, Seaview Terrace, The Old School House				56°47′41″N 2°20′16″W	Category C(S)	6243	Upload Photo
Johnshaven, 10 Dock Street				56°47′35″N 2°20′16″W	Category C(S)	6238	Upload Photo
Johnshaven, Waughton Place, Old Brewer's House				56°47′44″N 2°19′59″W	Category B	6247	Upload Photo
Johnshaven, 1 West Street With Detached Cottage To Rear				56°47′32″N 2°20′24″W	Category C(S)	6249	Upload Photo
Birnie Bridge Over Benholm Burn				56°48′49″N 2°19′33″W	Category C(S)	2806	Upload Photo
Parish Kirk Manse — Stables				56°48′51″N 2°19′16″W	Category C(S)	2801	Upload Photo
Johnshaven, 22 And 23 Main Street				56°47′36″N 2°20′20″W	Category B	6240	Upload Photo
Johnshaven, Shorehead, Fish Store				56°47′34″N 2°20′17″W	Category B	6244	Upload Photo
Mill Of Benholm				56°48′46″N 2°19′08″W	Category A	2805	Upload Photo
Parish Kirk Manse — Fruit Store				56°48′51″N 2°19′15″W	Category C(S)	2802	Upload Photo
Johnshaven, Seaview Terrace, The Old Manse				56°47′38″N 2°20′21″W	Category B	6242	Upload Photo
Johnshaven, 21 Waughton Place, Kelowna				56°47′42″N 2°20′04″W	Category C(S)	6248	Upload Photo
Johnshaven, 14 West Street				56°47′31″N 2°20′29″W	Category C(S)	6250	Upload Photo
Parish Kirk Manse				56°48′51″N 2°19′16″W	Category C(S)	2814	Upload Photo
Johnshaven, Main Street And Station Brae, K6 Telephone Kiosk				56°47′40″N 2°20′13″W	Category B	6419	Upload Photo
Johnshaven Ballandro Loan, Springfield				56°47′33″N 2°20′27″W	Category C(S)	6235	Upload Photo
Johnshaven, Shorehead, Lifeboat Station				56°47′40″N 2°20′09″W	Category C(S)	6245	Upload Photo
Johnshaven, 9 South Street				56°47′36″N 2°20′16″W	Category C(S)	6246	Upload Photo
Kirktown Of Benholm, Former Parish Church Including Graveyard, Boundary Walls, Gatepiers And Gates				56°48′52″N 2°19′19″W	Category A	2813	Upload another image See more images
Benholm Bridge Over Benholm Burn				56°48′41″N 2°18′59″W	Category C(S)	6418	Upload Photo
Benholm Bridge Over Castle Burn				56°48′54″N 2°19′17″W	Category C(S)	2804	Upload Photo
Dock Street, Sandy's Yard, Fish Curing House				56°47′37″N 2°20′16″W	Category B	6641	Upload Photo
Benholm Castle				56°49′30″N 2°19′22″W	Category A	2807	Upload Photo
Benholm Castle — Doocot				56°49′37″N 2°19′19″W	Category B	2808	Upload Photo
Benholm Schoolhouse				56°48′53″N 2°19′21″W	Category C(S)	2803	Upload Photo

== Key ==
The scheme for classifying buildings in Scotland is:

- Category A: "buildings of national or international importance, either architectural or historic; or fine, little-altered examples of some particular period, style or building type."
- Category B: "buildings of regional or more than local importance; or major examples of some particular period, style or building type, which may have been altered."
- Category C: "buildings of local importance; lesser examples of any period, style, or building type, as originally constructed or moderately altered; and simple traditional buildings which group well with other listed buildings."

In March 2016 there were 47,288 listed buildings in Scotland. Of these, 8% were Category A, and 50% were Category B, with the remaining 42% being Category C.

== See also ==
- List of listed buildings in Aberdeenshire
