= List of listed buildings in Strathdon, Aberdeenshire =

This is a list of listed buildings in the parish of Strathdon in Aberdeenshire, Scotland.

== List ==
Name	Location	Date Listed	Grid Ref. (Note: Sometimes known as OSGB36, the grid reference (where provided) is based on the British national grid reference system used by the Ordnance Survey. • "Guide to National Grid". Ordnance Survey. • "Get-a-map". Ordnance Survey.)	Geo-coordinates	Notes	LB Number (Note: Historic Environment Scotland assign a unique alphanumeric identifier to each designated site in Scotland, for listed buildings this always begins with "LB", for example "LB12345".)	Image
Candacraig House Policies, West Gate And Boundary Walls				57°11′09″N 3°05′52″W	Category C(S)	16168	Upload Photo
Skellater House Including Skellater Cottage				57°10′57″N 3°08′07″W	Category A	16173	Upload Photo
Corgarff, Luib Bridge Over River Don				57°09′51″N 3°13′02″W	Category B	16177	Upload Photo
Bridge Of Buchaam Over River Don				57°12′07″N 3°00′35″W	Category C(S)	16196	Upload Photo
Corgarff, Allt-Na-Ciste				57°09′49″N 3°12′20″W	Category C(S)	50628	Upload Photo
Glen Ernan, Edinglassie House Policies, Walled Garden				57°11′43″N 3°06′58″W	Category C(S)	50634	Upload Photo
Lonach Farmhouse (Former Inn)				57°10′34″N 3°07′01″W	Category C(S)	50638	Upload Photo
Delnadamph, Inchmore				57°09′34″N 3°17′42″W	Category C(S)	51459	Upload Photo
Candacraig House Policies, 1-5 (Inclusive) Candacraig Square (Former Coach House And Offices)				57°11′10″N 3°05′43″W	Category B	16165	Upload Photo
Candacraig House Policies, East Gate And Boundary Walls				57°11′19″N 3°05′32″W	Category C(S)	50624	Upload Photo
Corgarff, West Tornahaish Including Ancillary Buildings				57°09′33″N 3°10′07″W	Category B	50630	Upload Photo
Delnadamph, Mains Cottage And Kennels				57°09′39″N 3°16′50″W	Category C(S)	51458	Upload Photo
Corgarff, Our Lady Of The Snows Roman Catholic Chapel And Chapel House				57°09′21″N 3°10′17″W	Category C(S)	19782	Upload Photo
Inverernan House, Stables				57°11′08″N 3°06′36″W	Category C(S)	16170	Upload Photo
Rippachie, East Bridge Over Deskry Water				57°11′20″N 2°57′52″W	Category C(S)	16180	Upload Photo
Bellabeg House				57°12′13″N 3°04′07″W	Category A	16188	Upload Photo
Mill Of Newe House				57°11′52″N 3°02′33″W	Category C(S)	16194	Upload Photo
Glen Nochty, Auchernach Walled Garden				57°13′47″N 3°06′40″W	Category B	16199	Upload Photo
Lonach Hall, By Colquohonnie Castle				57°11′59″N 3°03′06″W	Category C(S)	48147	Upload Photo
Bellabeg, Bank House And Shop Including Ancillary Building				57°12′16″N 3°04′15″W	Category C(S)	50623	Upload Photo
Candacraig House Policies, Old Game Larder				57°11′10″N 3°05′44″W	Category C(S)	50625	Upload Photo
Candacraig House Policies, South East Gates, Outer And Inner				57°11′13″N 3°05′29″W	Category C(S)	50626	Upload Photo
Glen Conrie, Fleuchats				57°10′03″N 3°06′03″W	Category B	50631	Upload Photo
Poldullie Toll House				57°11′51″N 3°04′50″W	Category C(S)	19783	Upload Photo
Bellageg, Strathdon Church Of Scotland Parish Church				57°12′04″N 3°04′07″W	Category B	16183	Upload Photo
Glen Ernan, Edinglassie House Policies, Stable And Garage Block				57°11′42″N 3°06′48″W	Category C(S)	50633	Upload Photo
Glen Ernan, Edinglassie House Including Ancillary Structures				57°11′42″N 3°06′53″W	Category C(S)	19784	Upload Photo
Candacraig, Dovecot Cottage, Dovecot				57°11′11″N 3°05′25″W	Category B	16167	Upload Photo
Inverernan House				57°11′05″N 3°06′36″W	Category B	16169	Upload Photo
Inverernan House, Gates And Gatepiers				57°10′58″N 3°06′31″W	Category C(S)	16171	Upload Photo
Bellabeg, Old Manse Including Boundary Walls				57°12′05″N 3°04′07″W	Category C(S)	16186	Upload Photo
Corgarff, Loinherry				57°10′18″N 3°14′51″W	Category C(S)	50629	Upload Photo
Inverernan Estate, Ice House				57°11′06″N 3°06′49″W	Category C(S)	50636	Upload Photo
Inverernan House, Walled Garden				57°11′00″N 3°06′41″W	Category C(S)	50637	Upload Photo
Candacraig House Policies, Walled Garden Including Old Engine House (Summer House) Gatepiers And Gates				57°11′13″N 3°05′35″W	Category B	16166	Upload Photo
Corgarff, Auchmore				57°10′13″N 3°13′09″W	Category B	16179	Upload Photo
Forbestown School, Former Female Public School				57°12′10″N 3°03′40″W	Category C(S)	16190	Upload Photo
Bridge Of Newe Over River Don				57°11′43″N 3°02′15″W	Category C(S)	16195	Upload Photo
Poldullie Bridge Over River Don				57°11′55″N 3°04′47″W	Category B	16197	Upload Photo
Glen Nochty, Auchernach Dovecot				57°13′51″N 3°06′34″W	Category B	16200	Upload Photo
Glen Ernan, Edinglassie House Policies, Gate Lodges, Gatepiers And Gates				57°11′29″N 3°06′40″W	Category B	16162	Upload Photo
Candacraig House				57°11′10″N 3°05′40″W	Category B	16164	Upload Photo
Inverernan Estate, Dovecot Cottage				57°11′05″N 3°06′45″W	Category C(S)	49581	Upload Photo
Candacraig House Policies, Tempietta				57°11′09″N 3°05′34″W	Category C(S)	50627	Upload Photo
Glen Nochty, Auchernach Lodges				57°13′43″N 3°06′17″W	Category C(S)	16202	Upload Photo
Glen Ernan, Milton Of Edinglassie, Dairy				57°11′14″N 3°06′19″W	Category C(S)	50635	Upload Photo
Glen Conrie, Mill Of Glenconrie				57°10′45″N 3°06′28″W	Category B	16172	Upload Photo
Colnabaichin Toll House				57°09′51″N 3°10′08″W	Category C(S)	16174	Upload Photo
Corgarff, Former Church Of Scotland Church				57°09′36″N 3°11′35″W	Category B	16176	Upload Photo
Bellabeg, Strathdon Church Of Scotland Parish Church Graveyard Including Boundary Walls, Gatepiers And Gates				57°12′03″N 3°04′08″W	Category C(S)	16184	Upload Photo
Bellabeg, Strathdon Church Of Scotland Parish Church, Mitchell-Forbes Mausoleum				57°12′03″N 3°04′06″W	Category B	16185	Upload Photo
Bellabeg, Mill Of Bellabeg				57°12′17″N 3°04′20″W	Category B	16189	Upload Photo
Mill Of Newe				57°11′50″N 3°02′31″W	Category C(S)	16193	Upload Photo
Glen Nochty, Bridge Of Auchernach Over Water Nochty				57°13′37″N 3°06′07″W	Category C(S)	16198	Upload Photo
Glen Nochty, Auchernach Cottage Including Ancillary Structure				57°13′45″N 3°06′33″W	Category C(S)	16201	Upload Photo
Candacraig House Policies, East Lodge				57°11′18″N 3°05′32″W	Category B	16163	Upload Photo
Glen Ernan, Edinglassie House Policies, Keeper's Cottage				57°11′45″N 3°06′46″W	Category C(S)	50632	Upload Photo
Newe Avenue No 3 (Also Known As No 2) And Coach House				57°11′57″N 3°01′25″W	Category C(S)	50639	Upload Photo
Newe Lodge				57°11′46″N 3°02′19″W	Category C(S)	50640	Upload Photo

== Key ==
The scheme for classifying buildings in Scotland is:

- Category A: "buildings of national or international importance, either architectural or historic; or fine, little-altered examples of some particular period, style or building type."
- Category B: "buildings of regional or more than local importance; or major examples of some particular period, style or building type, which may have been altered."
- Category C: "buildings of local importance; lesser examples of any period, style, or building type, as originally constructed or moderately altered; and simple traditional buildings which group well with other listed buildings."

In March 2016 there were 47,288 listed buildings in Scotland. Of these, 8% were Category A, and 50% were Category B, with the remaining 42% being Category C.

== See also ==
- List of listed buildings in Aberdeenshire
