= List of listed buildings in Tullynessle and Forbes, Aberdeenshire =

This is a list of listed buildings in the parish of Tullynessle and Forbes in Aberdeenshire, Scotland.

== List ==
Name	Location	Date Listed	Grid Ref. (Note: Sometimes known as OSGB36, the grid reference (where provided) is based on the British national grid reference system used by the Ordnance Survey. • "Guide to National Grid". Ordnance Survey. • "Get-a-map". Ordnance Survey.)	Geo-coordinates	Notes	LB Number (Note: Historic Environment Scotland assign a unique alphanumeric identifier to each designated site in Scotland, for listed buildings this always begins with "LB", for example "LB12345".)	Image
Montgarrie Meal Mill				57°14′54″N 2°42′23″W	Category A	16207	Upload Photo
Muckletown Steading				57°17′05″N 2°42′49″W	Category B	16211	Upload Photo
Forbes Church				57°14′25″N 2°47′53″W	Category B	16181	Upload Photo
Tullynessle House Former Manse Of Tullynessle				57°15′54″N 2°44′00″W	Category B	16204	Upload Photo
Manse Cottage (Beadle's House)				57°15′55″N 2°44′00″W	Category B	16205	Upload Photo
Bridge Of Alford Over River Don				57°14′35″N 2°43′42″W	Category B	19785	Upload Photo
Bridge Of Alford, Former Bridge Of Alford Stores				57°14′37″N 2°43′43″W	Category C(S)	48572	Upload Photo
Bellcote Of Old Parish Church Set Up Within Churchyard Of Parish Church				57°15′55″N 2°44′03″W	Category B	16203	Upload Photo
Terpersie Castle				57°16′14″N 2°45′13″W	Category A	13879	Upload Photo
Whitehaugh House, Walled Garden And Octagon Gazebo				57°14′49″N 2°40′19″W	Category B	16209	Upload Photo
Whitehaugh House, Mausoleum				57°14′58″N 2°41′17″W	Category B	16210	Upload Photo
Forbes Arms. Bridge Of Alford				57°14′37″N 2°43′41″W	Category C(S)	16206	Upload Photo
Whitehaugh House				57°14′44″N 2°40′20″W	Category B	16208	Upload Photo
Bridge Of Alford, Donbank Including Boundary Wall				57°14′37″N 2°43′44″W	Category C(S)	48573	Upload Photo
Muckletown Farmhouse				57°17′05″N 2°42′49″W	Category C(S)	16182	Upload Photo

== Key ==
The scheme for classifying buildings in Scotland is:

- Category A: "buildings of national or international importance, either architectural or historic; or fine, little-altered examples of some particular period, style or building type."
- Category B: "buildings of regional or more than local importance; or major examples of some particular period, style or building type, which may have been altered."
- Category C: "buildings of local importance; lesser examples of any period, style, or building type, as originally constructed or moderately altered; and simple traditional buildings which group well with other listed buildings."

In March 2016 there were 47,288 listed buildings in Scotland. Of these, 8% were Category A, and 50% were Category B, with the remaining 42% being Category C.

== See also ==
- List of listed buildings in Aberdeenshire
