= List of listed buildings in Logie Buchan, Aberdeenshire =

This is a list of listed buildings in the parish of Logie Buchan in Aberdeenshire, Scotland.

== List ==
Name	Location	Date Listed	Grid Ref. (Note: Sometimes known as OSGB36, the grid reference (where provided) is based on the British national grid reference system used by the Ordnance Survey. • "Guide to National Grid". Ordnance Survey. • "Get-a-map". Ordnance Survey.)	Geo-coordinates	Notes	LB Number (Note: Historic Environment Scotland assign a unique alphanumeric identifier to each designated site in Scotland, for listed buildings this always begins with "LB", for example "LB12345".)	Image
Oldyard				57°22′35″N 2°01′17″W	Category B	9090	Upload Photo
Mission Hall And House, Denhead, Auchmacoy				57°21′49″N 2°00′37″W	Category C(S)	9091	Upload Photo
South Artrochie				57°21′51″N 1°59′45″W	Category B	9092	Upload Photo
Auchmacoy Memorial Bridge				57°21′35″N 2°01′01″W	Category B	49669	Upload Photo
Manse Of Logie-Buchan				57°21′29″N 2°01′17″W	Category C(S)	9086	Upload Photo
Auchmacoy House				57°22′05″N 2°00′52″W	Category B	9088	Upload Photo
Parish Church Of Logie-Buchan (St. Andrew)				57°21′30″N 2°01′13″W	Category B	9084	Upload Photo
Churchyard Of Logie-Buchan				57°21′30″N 2°01′13″W	Category C(S)	9085	Upload Photo
Mains Of Rannieston				57°19′36″N 2°06′22″W	Category B	9087	Upload Photo
Auchmacoy Dovecot				57°22′24″N 2°01′07″W	Category A	9089	Upload Photo

== Key ==
The scheme for classifying buildings in Scotland is:

- Category A: "buildings of national or international importance, either architectural or historic; or fine, little-altered examples of some particular period, style or building type."
- Category B: "buildings of regional or more than local importance; or major examples of some particular period, style or building type, which may have been altered."
- Category C: "buildings of local importance; lesser examples of any period, style, or building type, as originally constructed or moderately altered; and simple traditional buildings which group well with other listed buildings."

In March 2016 there were 47,288 listed buildings in Scotland. Of these, 8% were Category A, and 50% were Category B, with the remaining 42% being Category C.

== See also ==
- List of listed buildings in Aberdeenshire
