= List of listed buildings in New Machar, Aberdeenshire =

This is a list of listed buildings in the parish of New Machar in Aberdeenshire, Scotland.

== List ==
Name	Location	Date Listed	Grid Ref. (Note: Sometimes known as OSGB36, the grid reference (where provided) is based on the British national grid reference system used by the Ordnance Survey. • "Guide to National Grid". Ordnance Survey. • "Get-a-map". Ordnance Survey.)	Geo-coordinates	Notes	LB Number (Note: Historic Environment Scotland assign a unique alphanumeric identifier to each designated site in Scotland, for listed buildings this always begins with "LB", for example "LB12345".)	Image
Parkhill Pumping Station, With Lade Aqueduct Tanks And Supervisor's House				57°13′27″N 2°11′11″W	Category B	18957	Upload Photo
Straloch House - Lodge				57°16′59″N 2°13′41″W	Category B	16127	Upload Photo
Straloch Policies, Home Farm (Original Building Of 19Th Century Or Earlier Only, Modern Additions Excluded)				57°17′01″N 2°13′55″W	Category C(S)	16130	Upload Photo
Straloch House - Walled Garden				57°16′56″N 2°14′01″W	Category C(S)	16126	Upload Photo
Elrick House				57°15′20″N 2°11′43″W	Category B	16128	Upload Photo
Elrick - Dovecot				57°15′22″N 2°11′46″W	Category C(S)	16129	Upload Photo
Parkhill House, West Lodge (Gate-Lodge)				57°13′04″N 2°11′04″W	Category B	13880	Upload Photo
All Saints Episcopal Church, Whiterashes				57°18′07″N 2°14′34″W	Category B	16124	Upload Photo
Elrick Policies, Home Farm Steading				57°15′17″N 2°11′27″W	Category C(S)	16131	Upload Photo
New Machar Parish Church, New Machar (Summerhill)				57°15′56″N 2°11′17″W	Category B	16148	Upload Photo
Straloch House, The Stables				57°16′48″N 2°14′10″W	Category B	50144	Upload Photo
A947, Goval Bridge				57°13′25″N 2°11′07″W	Category B	49670	Upload Photo
Straloch House				57°16′48″N 2°13′58″W	Category A	16125	Upload Photo

== Key ==
The scheme for classifying buildings in Scotland is:

- Category A: "buildings of national or international importance, either architectural or historic; or fine, little-altered examples of some particular period, style or building type."
- Category B: "buildings of regional or more than local importance; or major examples of some particular period, style or building type, which may have been altered."
- Category C: "buildings of local importance; lesser examples of any period, style, or building type, as originally constructed or moderately altered; and simple traditional buildings which group well with other listed buildings."

In March 2016 there were 47,288 listed buildings in Scotland. Of these, 8% were Category A, and 50% were Category B, with the remaining 42% being Category C.

== See also ==
- List of listed buildings in Aberdeenshire
