= List of listed buildings in St Fergus, Aberdeenshire =

This is a list of listed buildings in the parish of St Fergus in Aberdeenshire, Scotland.

== List ==
Name	Location	Date Listed	Grid Ref. (Note: Sometimes known as OSGB36, the grid reference (where provided) is based on the British national grid reference system used by the Ordnance Survey. • "Guide to National Grid". Ordnance Survey. • "Get-a-map". Ordnance Survey.)	Geo-coordinates	Notes	LB Number (Note: Historic Environment Scotland assign a unique alphanumeric identifier to each designated site in Scotland, for listed buildings this always begins with "LB", for example "LB12345".)	Image
Newton Farm Steading				57°33′27″N 1°50′16″W	Category C(S)	18961	Upload Photo
Hill View, Kirktown Of St. Fergus				57°33′29″N 1°51′07″W	Category C(S)	16534	Upload Photo
The Gables (Former Free Manse Of St. Fergus)				57°33′29″N 1°50′46″W	Category C(S)	16535	Upload Photo
Inverugie Castle				57°31′29″N 1°49′52″W	Category B	13893	Upload Photo
Kinloch Farmhouse				57°32′45″N 1°50′18″W	Category C(S)	18976	Upload Photo
Lunderton House				57°32′03″N 1°49′38″W	Category C(S)	19799	Upload Photo
Manse Of St Fergus				57°33′29″N 1°50′42″W	Category C(S)	16532	Upload Photo
Inverugie Bridge Over River Ugie				57°31′25″N 1°50′02″W	Category C(S)	16537	Upload Photo
Parish Church Of St Fergus				57°33′28″N 1°50′45″W	Category B	16531	Upload Photo
Kirktown Of St. Fergus				57°33′28″N 1°50′55″W	Category C(S)	16533	Upload Photo
Old Churchyard Of St. Fergus, St. Fergus Links				57°32′48″N 1°48′30″W	Category B	16536	Upload Photo

== Key ==
The scheme for classifying buildings in Scotland is:

- Category A: "buildings of national or international importance, either architectural or historic; or fine, little-altered examples of some particular period, style or building type."
- Category B: "buildings of regional or more than local importance; or major examples of some particular period, style or building type, which may have been altered."
- Category C: "buildings of local importance; lesser examples of any period, style, or building type, as originally constructed or moderately altered; and simple traditional buildings which group well with other listed buildings."

In March 2016 there were 47,288 listed buildings in Scotland. Of these, 8% were Category A, and 50% were Category B, with the remaining 42% being Category C.

== See also ==
- List of listed buildings in Aberdeenshire
