= List of listed buildings in Marnoch, Aberdeenshire =

This is a list of listed buildings in the parish of Marnoch in Aberdeenshire, Scotland.

== List ==
Name	Location	Date listed	Geo-coordinates	Notes	Category	LB number	Image
Netherdale, Barnyards Of Netherdale, Dovecot			57°31′42″N 2°35′14″W		C(S)	19617	Upload Photo
Netherdale Walled Garden, Summerhouse Sundial And Gatepiers			57°31′44″N 2°35′00″W		B	19620	Upload Photo
Culvie With Steading And Walled Garden			57°34′16″N 2°41′04″W		B	19603	Upload Photo
Marnoch Graveyard With Watchhouse, Burial Enclosures And Gravestones			57°32′16″N 2°40′42″W		A	19610	Upload Photo
Kinnairdy Castle With Outbuildings			57°32′12″N 2°39′17″W		A	19606	Upload another image
Marnoch, Old Church With Retaining Wall, Standing Stones And Mounting Block			57°32′24″N 2°40′29″W		B	19611	Upload another image
Mill Of Alliehar			57°34′42″N 2°38′49″W		C(S)	19614	Upload Photo
Auldtown Of Netherdale Steading			57°31′13″N 2°36′30″W		C(S)	16023	Upload Photo
Clunie Home Farm			57°32′25″N 2°36′27″W		B	16027	Upload Photo
Ardmeallie House With Steading Range, Coachhouse, Boundary Walls And Gatepiers			57°32′38″N 2°41′05″W		B	16028	Upload Photo
Netherdale House, Coachhouse Stable And Coachman's House, And Garage			57°31′30″N 2°34′57″W		B	19619	Upload Photo
Janefield			57°32′56″N 2°38′52″W		B	19605	Upload Photo
Kinnairdy Castle, Dovecot And Walled Garden			57°32′11″N 2°39′18″W		B	19607	Upload Photo
Marnoch, Old Schoolhouse			57°32′19″N 2°40′25″W		B	19613	Upload Photo
Auchintoul, Mains Of Auchintoul - Smithy			57°33′32″N 2°38′48″W		C(S)	16032	Upload Photo
House Of Glennie With Garden Walls And Gates And Gatepiers			57°31′58″N 2°41′56″W		B	19604	Upload Photo
Mill Of Kinnairdy Bridge			57°32′21″N 2°39′00″W		C(S)	19615	Upload Photo
Clunie			57°32′24″N 2°36′32″W		B	16025	Upload Photo
Auchintoul, Mains Of Auchintoul, Farmhouse With Garden Walls			57°33′32″N 2°38′48″W		B	16031	Upload Photo
Clunie Walled Garden			57°32′23″N 2°36′25″W		C(S)	19601	Upload Photo
Lootcherbrae, Smithy			57°34′29″N 2°39′38″W		C(S)	19609	Upload Photo
Auchintoul, South Lodge With Gates And Gatepiers			57°33′08″N 2°38′59″W		B	16020	Upload Photo
Clunie Dovecot			57°32′24″N 2°36′17″W		C(S)	16026	Upload Photo
Mill Of Kinnairdy, Miller's House			57°32′21″N 2°39′05″W		C(S)	19616	Upload Photo
Netherdale House			57°31′27″N 2°34′58″W		B	19618	Upload Photo
Crombie Castle			57°33′31″N 2°41′07″W		A	19602	Upload Photo
Auchintoul, Mill Of Auchintoul			57°33′04″N 2°38′58″W		B	16033	Upload another image
Auchintoul With Courtyard Walls			57°33′21″N 2°38′54″W		B	16030	Upload Photo
Longlaugh			57°31′32″N 2°38′18″W		C(S)	19608	Upload Photo
Auchintoul, Walled Garden And Sundial			57°33′27″N 2°38′49″W		B	16021	Upload Photo
Chapeltown			57°30′57″N 2°37′33″W		C(S)	16024	Upload Photo
Ardmeallie Walled Garden With Summerhouse And Sundial			57°32′40″N 2°41′08″W		B	16029	Upload Photo
Auchintoul, Mains Of Auchintoul - Steading			57°33′31″N 2°38′48″W		B	19771	Upload Photo
Marnoch, Old Manse Of Marnoch With Outbuildings And Garden Walls			57°32′21″N 2°40′47″W		B	19612	Upload another image
Auldtown Of Netherdale With Coachhouse			57°31′12″N 2°36′21″W		B	16022	Upload Photo

== Key ==
The scheme for classifying buildings in Scotland is:

- Category A: "buildings of national or international importance, either architectural or historic; or fine, little-altered examples of some particular period, style or building type."
- Category B: "buildings of regional or more than local importance; or major examples of some particular period, style or building type, which may have been altered."
- Category C: "buildings of local importance; lesser examples of any period, style, or building type, as originally constructed or moderately altered; and simple traditional buildings which group well with other listed buildings."

In March 2016 there were 47,288 listed buildings in Scotland. Of these, 8% were Category A, and 50% were Category B, with the remaining 42% being Category C.

== See also ==
- List of listed buildings in Aberdeenshire
