= List of listed buildings in Bervie =

This is a list of listed buildings in the parish of Inverbervie in Aberdeenshire, Scotland.

== List ==
Name	Location	Date listed	Geo-coordinates	Notes	Category	LB number	Image
Hallgreeen Mains Farmhouse			56°50′12″N 2°17′28″W		C(S)	2812	Upload Photo
Hallgreen Castle			56°50′25″N 2°16′40″W		B	2811	Upload Photo
Hallgreen Mains			56°50′13″N 2°17′28″W		C(S)	2810	Upload Photo

== Key ==
The scheme for classifying buildings in Scotland is:

- Category A: "buildings of national or international importance, either architectural or historic; or fine, little-altered examples of some particular period, style or building type."
- Category B: "buildings of regional or more than local importance; or major examples of some particular period, style or building type, which may have been altered."
- Category C: "buildings of local importance; lesser examples of any period, style, or building type, as originally constructed or moderately altered; and simple traditional buildings which group well with other listed buildings."

In March 2016 there were 47,288 listed buildings in Scotland. Of these, 8% were Category A, and 50% were Category B, with the remaining 42% being Category C.

== See also ==
- List of listed buildings in Aberdeenshire
