= List of listed buildings in Keig, Aberdeenshire =

This is a list of listed buildings in the parish of Keig in Aberdeenshire, Scotland.

== List ==
Name	Location	Date listed	Grid ref. (Note: Sometimes known as OSGB36, the grid reference (where provided) is based on the British national grid reference system used by the Ordnance Survey. • "Guide to National Grid". Ordnance Survey. • "Get-a-map". Ordnance Survey.)	Geo-coordinates	Notes	LB number (Note: Historic Environment Scotland assign a unique alphanumeric identifier to each designated site in Scotland, for listed buildings this always begins with "LB", for example "LB12345".)	Image
Bridge Of Keig Over River Don				57°15′26″N 2°38′06″W	Category A	9057	Upload Photo
Mill Of Keig Former Corn Mill				57°15′50″N 2°38′24″W	Category B	9060	Upload Photo
Keig, Glebe Field Hall And Stables				57°15′43″N 2°38′44″W	Category C(S)	50132	Upload Photo
Castle Forbes				57°15′41″N 2°37′45″W	Category B	9058	Upload Photo
Keig Parish Church				57°15′46″N 2°38′45″W	Category B	9054	Upload Photo
Old Church Of Keig And Churchyard				57°15′33″N 2°38′00″W	Category B	9055	Upload Photo
Oakbank (Old Manse Of Keig)				57°15′30″N 2°38′09″W	Category C(S)	9056	Upload Photo
Airlie, Farmhouse				57°15′47″N 2°39′12″W	Category C(S)	9061	Upload Photo
Auchnagathle				57°16′19″N 2°37′56″W	Category C(S)	9062	Upload Photo
Castle Forbes Game-Larder Buildings At Rear Of				57°15′41″N 2°37′41″W	Category B	9059	Upload Photo
Manse Of Keig				57°15′44″N 2°38′49″W	Category C(S)	9063	Upload Photo

== Key ==
The scheme for classifying buildings in Scotland is:

- Category A: "buildings of national or international importance, either architectural or historic; or fine, little-altered examples of some particular period, style or building type."
- Category B: "buildings of regional or more than local importance; or major examples of some particular period, style or building type, which may have been altered."
- Category C: "buildings of local importance; lesser examples of any period, style, or building type, as originally constructed or moderately altered; and simple traditional buildings which group well with other listed buildings."

In March 2016 there were 47,288 listed buildings in Scotland. Of these, 8% were Category A, and 50% were Category B, with the remaining 42% being Category C.

== See also ==
- List of listed buildings in Aberdeenshire
