= List of listed buildings in Kinellar, Aberdeenshire =

This is a list of listed buildings in the parish of Kinellar in Aberdeenshire, Scotland.

== List ==
Name	Location	Date Listed	Grid Ref. (Note: Sometimes known as OSGB36, the grid reference (where provided) is based on the British national grid reference system used by the Ordnance Survey. • "Guide to National Grid". Ordnance Survey. • "Get-a-map". Ordnance Survey.)	Geo-coordinates	Notes	LB Number (Note: Historic Environment Scotland assign a unique alphanumeric identifier to each designated site in Scotland, for listed buildings this always begins with "LB", for example "LB12345".)	Image
Old Manse Of Kinellar, Including Walled Garden				57°13′11″N 2°17′56″W	Category B	9116	Upload Photo
Kinellar, Tertowie House Including Terraced Wall, Bridge, Memorial Stone And Gatepiers				57°10′55″N 2°17′46″W	Category B	9119	Upload Photo
Kinellar, Tertowie House, Nuclear Bunker				57°10′55″N 2°17′49″W	Category B	50069	Upload Photo
Manse Of Kinellar				57°13′11″N 2°17′56″W	Category C(S)	9117	Upload Photo
Kinellar, Tertowie House, Walled Garden				57°10′55″N 2°17′39″W	Category B	50071	Upload Photo
Parish Church Of Kinellar, Including Churchyard Walls				57°13′13″N 2°17′50″W	Category B	9115	Upload Photo
Gardener's Cottage Caskieben				57°12′21″N 2°16′54″W	Category B	9120	Upload Photo
Kinaldie Doocot				57°13′46″N 2°16′44″W	Category B	9122	Upload Photo
Kinellar House				57°12′24″N 2°18′28″W	Category B	9118	Upload Photo
Kinaldie Home Farm				57°13′45″N 2°16′40″W	Category C(S)	9123	Upload Photo
Kinaldie House				57°13′49″N 2°16′50″W	Category B	9121	Upload Photo
Kinellar, Tertowie House, Stable Courtyard Including Boundary Wall				57°10′56″N 2°17′40″W	Category C(S)	50070	Upload Photo

== Key ==
The scheme for classifying buildings in Scotland is:

- Category A: "buildings of national or international importance, either architectural or historic; or fine, little-altered examples of some particular period, style or building type."
- Category B: "buildings of regional or more than local importance; or major examples of some particular period, style or building type, which may have been altered."
- Category C: "buildings of local importance; lesser examples of any period, style, or building type, as originally constructed or moderately altered; and simple traditional buildings which group well with other listed buildings."

In March 2016 there were 47,288 listed buildings in Scotland. Of these, 8% were Category A, and 50% were Category B, with the remaining 42% being Category C.

== See also ==
- List of listed buildings in Aberdeenshire
