= List of listed buildings in Laurencekirk, Aberdeenshire =

This is a list of listed buildings in the parish of Laurencekirk in Aberdeenshire, Scotland.

== List ==
Name	Location	Date Listed	Grid Ref. (Note: Sometimes known as OSGB36, the grid reference (where provided) is based on the British national grid reference system used by the Ordnance Survey. • "Guide to National Grid". Ordnance Survey. • "Get-a-map". Ordnance Survey.)	Geo-coordinates	Notes	LB Number (Note: Historic Environment Scotland assign a unique alphanumeric identifier to each designated site in Scotland, for listed buildings this always begins with "LB", for example "LB12345".)	Image
Frogfield, Off Station Road				56°50′04″N 2°28′00″W	Category B	37232	Upload Photo
Johnstone Lodge, Gardener's Cottage				56°49′18″N 2°27′24″W	Category B	6752	Upload Photo
Laurencekirk Parish Kirk				56°50′07″N 2°27′49″W	Category B	37229	Upload Photo
High Street, Adjoining High Street At Corner Of Charters Avenue				56°50′00″N 2°27′57″W	Category C(S)	37233	Upload Photo
13-15 (Odd Nos) High Street				56°50′04″N 2°27′49″W	Category C(S)	43682	Upload Photo
Johnston Lodge - Mains Farmhouse				56°49′20″N 2°27′29″W	Category C(S)	9525	Upload Photo
Blackiemuir Mill Bridge Over Luther Water				56°50′03″N 2°29′46″W	Category B	9527	Upload Photo
Scotston Farmhouse Including Ancillary Buildings				56°51′18″N 2°26′22″W	Category C(S)	49842	Upload Photo
Johnston Lodge - Beattie Lodge				56°49′39″N 2°27′59″W	Category B	37234	Upload Photo
Johnston Lodge, - West Lodge Gates				56°49′36″N 2°28′34″W	Category C(S)	37235	Upload Photo
Johnston Lodge				56°49′19″N 2°27′52″W	Category B	9524	Upload Photo
Mains Of Haulkerton Bridge Over Luther Water				56°50′39″N 2°28′24″W	Category C(S)	9529	Upload Photo
Thornton North Lodge Bridge Over Luther Water				56°50′25″N 2°30′55″W	Category C(S)	9530	Upload Photo
4-6 Alma Place, Laurence's				56°50′03″N 2°27′49″W	Category B	43643	Upload Photo
"East View", Formerly Parish Kirk Manse				56°50′08″N 2°27′51″W	Category C(S)	37231	Upload Photo
Mill Of Conveth				56°51′34″N 2°26′47″W	Category C(S)	9528	Upload Photo
Laurencekirk Railway Station Including Canopy				56°50′13″N 2°27′55″W	Category B	47653	Upload Photo
11 Alma Place				56°50′03″N 2°27′48″W	Category C(S)	43683	Upload Photo
Johnston Lodge - Chalybeate Well				56°49′15″N 2°27′39″W	Category B	9526	Upload Photo
1 Alma Place And 17 High Street				56°50′04″N 2°27′49″W	Category B	43684	Upload Photo
Gardenstone Arms Hotel, High Street				56°50′05″N 2°27′46″W	Category C(S)	37230	Upload Photo

== Key ==
The scheme for classifying buildings in Scotland is:

- Category A: "buildings of national or international importance, either architectural or historic; or fine, little-altered examples of some particular period, style or building type."
- Category B: "buildings of regional or more than local importance; or major examples of some particular period, style or building type, which may have been altered."
- Category C: "buildings of local importance; lesser examples of any period, style, or building type, as originally constructed or moderately altered; and simple traditional buildings which group well with other listed buildings."

In March 2016 there were 47,288 listed buildings in Scotland. Of these, 8% were Category A, and 50% were Category B, with the remaining 42% being Category C.

== See also ==
- List of listed buildings in Aberdeenshire
