= List of listed buildings in Glenbuchat, Aberdeenshire =

This is a list of listed buildings in the parish of Glenbuchat in Aberdeenshire, Scotland.

== List ==
Name	Location	Date Listed	Grid Ref. (Note: Sometimes known as OSGB36, the grid reference (where provided) is based on the British national grid reference system used by the Ordnance Survey. • "Guide to National Grid". Ordnance Survey. • "Get-a-map". Ordnance Survey.)	Geo-coordinates	Notes	LB Number (Note: Historic Environment Scotland assign a unique alphanumeric identifier to each designated site in Scotland, for listed buildings this always begins with "LB", for example "LB12345".)	Image
Old Parish Church Graveyard Including Gatepiers And Gates				57°13′21″N 3°02′08″W	Category B	9127	Upload Photo
Auld Kirk House (Former Free Church Manse) Including Ancillary Building, Walled Garden, Boundary Walls, Gatepiers And Gates				57°13′59″N 3°02′03″W	Category B	50667	Upload Photo
Dulax Farmhouse And Steading				57°14′54″N 3°04′28″W	Category B	50674	Upload Photo
Auld Kirk (Former Free Church) Including Boundary Walls				57°13′59″N 3°02′03″W	Category C(S)	50663	Upload Photo
Castle Lodge, Walled Garden Including Gatepiers, Gate And Ancillary Buildings				57°13′14″N 3°00′00″W	Category B	9130	Upload Photo
Badenyon, Begg's House				57°15′26″N 3°05′42″W	Category B	9134	Upload Photo
Badenyon, Jeannie's House, Steading And Jeannie's Mother's House				57°15′26″N 3°05′38″W	Category C(S)	50671	Upload Photo
Badenyon, Begg's House Steading				57°15′26″N 3°05′44″W	Category C(S)	13714	Upload Photo
Old Parish Church (Church Of Scotland)				57°13′22″N 3°02′08″W	Category A	9126	Upload Photo
Mill Of Glenbuchat Including Barn And House				57°14′08″N 3°02′54″W	Category B	9131	Upload Photo
Upperton Cottage				57°14′49″N 3°03′18″W	Category C(S)	50680	Upload Photo
Old Parish Church Manse And Former Stable				57°13′20″N 3°02′08″W	Category C(S)	9128	Upload Photo

== Key ==
The scheme for classifying buildings in Scotland is:

- Category A: "buildings of national or international importance, either architectural or historic; or fine, little-altered examples of some particular period, style or building type."
- Category B: "buildings of regional or more than local importance; or major examples of some particular period, style or building type, which may have been altered."
- Category C: "buildings of local importance; lesser examples of any period, style, or building type, as originally constructed or moderately altered; and simple traditional buildings which group well with other listed buildings."

In March 2016 there were 47,288 listed buildings in Scotland. Of these, 8% were Category A, and 50% were Category B, with the remaining 42% being Category C.

== See also ==
- List of listed buildings in Aberdeenshire
