= List of listed buildings in Chapel of Garioch =

This is a list of listed buildings in the parish of Chapel of Garioch in Aberdeenshire, Scotland.

== List ==
Name	Location	Date Listed	Grid Ref. (Note: Sometimes known as OSGB36, the grid reference (where provided) is based on the British national grid reference system used by the Ordnance Survey. • "Guide to National Grid". Ordnance Survey. • "Get-a-map". Ordnance Survey.)	Geo-coordinates	Notes	LB Number (Note: Historic Environment Scotland assign a unique alphanumeric identifier to each designated site in Scotland, for listed buildings this always begins with "LB", for example "LB12345".)	Image
Pittodrie House Gunroom				57°18′20″N 2°30′14″W	Category B	2854	Upload Photo
Logie House, Doocot				57°19′30″N 2°29′49″W	Category B	2860	Upload another image
Logie Durno Church And Churchyard				57°19′38″N 2°29′34″W	Category C(S)	2825	Upload Photo
Pitcaple Castle				57°19′28″N 2°27′16″W	Category A	2830	Upload Photo
St. John's R.C. Church And Presbytery House Fetternear				57°14′58″N 2°27′59″W	Category B	2834	Upload another image
Fetternear, Stable Offices				57°14′47″N 2°27′28″W	Category C(S)	2836	Upload Photo
Chapel Of Garioch Parish Church				57°18′26″N 2°28′21″W	Category B	2845	Upload another image See more images
Logie Country House (Logie House Hotel)				57°19′20″N 2°29′29″W	Category B	2857	Upload another image See more images
East Balhalgardy Cottar Houses Occupied By Dorward And Green (Old Farmhouse)				57°18′15″N 2°23′53″W	Category B	2832	Upload Photo
Ruins Of Old House Of Fetternear				57°14′37″N 2°27′36″W	Category B	2835	Upload another image See more images
Chapel Of Garioch, Churchyard				57°18′26″N 2°28′21″W	Category C(S)	2847	Upload Photo
Outbuildings (Former Steading) Of Lynwood (Formerly Skelpers Farm)				57°18′27″N 2°28′25″W	Category C(S)	2848	Upload Photo
Pittodrie House				57°18′19″N 2°30′13″W	Category B	2853	Upload another image
Former Roadbridge Over Lochter Burn				57°18′15″N 2°23′19″W	Category C(S)	6708	Upload another image
Pitcaple, Pitbee				57°18′58″N 2°28′04″W	Category C(S)	6410	Upload Photo
Harlaw Monument				57°18′24″N 2°24′51″W	Category B	2831	Upload another image See more images
Logie Durno Churchyard, Dalrymple Horn Elphinstone Burial Enclosure				57°19′38″N 2°29′35″W	Category B	2826	Upload Photo
Mill Of Durno, Grain Mill				57°19′15″N 2°28′22″W	Category B	2827	Upload Photo
Chapel Of Garioch, Churchyard Gateway. (Pittodrie's Yate)				57°18′25″N 2°28′23″W	Category A	2846	Upload another image See more images
Inverarmsay Bridge Over River Urie				57°18′42″N 2°25′52″W	Category B	2850	Upload another image
Pittodrie House Sundial				57°18′17″N 2°30′10″W	Category B	2855	Upload Photo
Bridge Of Pitcaple Over River Urie				57°19′25″N 2°27′50″W	Category C(S)	2829	Upload Photo
Harlaw House				57°18′46″N 2°25′17″W	Category C(S)	2851	Upload another image
Arcot, (Former Free Manse) Pitcaple				57°19′01″N 2°27′44″W	Category B	2828	Upload Photo
Logie House, Walled Garden				57°19′23″N 2°29′46″W	Category B	2859	Upload Photo
Blairdaff Church				57°15′02″N 2°30′17″W	Category B	2833	Upload another image
Logie House Lodge				57°19′14″N 2°30′00″W	Category C(S)	2856	Upload Photo

== Key ==
The scheme for classifying buildings in Scotland is:

- Category A: "buildings of national or international importance, either architectural or historic; or fine, little-altered examples of some particular period, style or building type."
- Category B: "buildings of regional or more than local importance; or major examples of some particular period, style or building type, which may have been altered."
- Category C: "buildings of local importance; lesser examples of any period, style, or building type, as originally constructed or moderately altered; and simple traditional buildings which group well with other listed buildings."

In March 2016 there were 47,288 listed buildings in Scotland. Of these, 8% were Category A, and 50% were Category B, with the remaining 42% being Category C.

== See also ==
- List of listed buildings in Aberdeenshire
