= List of listed buildings in Tarland, Aberdeenshire =

This is a list of listed buildings in the parish of Tarland in Aberdeenshire, Scotland.

== List ==
Name	Location	Date Listed	Grid Ref. (Note: Sometimes known as OSGB36, the grid reference (where provided) is based on the British national grid reference system used by the Ordnance Survey. • "Guide to National Grid". Ordnance Survey. • "Get-a-map". Ordnance Survey.)	Geo-coordinates	Notes	LB Number (Note: Historic Environment Scotland assign a unique alphanumeric identifier to each designated site in Scotland, for listed buildings this always begins with "LB", for example "LB12345".)	Image
Tarland, St. Moluag's Parish Church				57°07′48″N 2°51′11″W	Category B	19790	Upload Photo
Tarland, Old Parish Church Including Churchyard, Boundary Wall, Gatepiers, Lower Terrace Retaining Wall And Drinking Fountain				57°07′39″N 2°51′27″W	Category B	16242	Upload Photo
Tarland, The Aberdeen Arms Hotel Including Steading				57°07′39″N 2°51′30″W	Category B	16244	Upload Photo
Alastrean House Including Sundial				57°07′52″N 2°50′35″W	Category B	49157	Upload Photo
Douneside House Including Home Farmhouse, Garden Wall And Cheese Press, Alpha Cottage, Gate Lodge, Boundary Wall And Gatepiers				57°08′30″N 2°51′30″W	Category C(S)	49159	Upload Photo
Mill Of Culsh				57°08′15″N 2°49′42″W	Category C(S)	16213	Upload Photo
Tarland, The Old Mill				57°07′43″N 2°51′43″W	Category C(S)	16245	Upload Photo
Aberdeen Road, Old Union House, Steading				57°07′50″N 2°51′23″W	Category C(S)	49973	Upload Photo
Tarland, War Memorial				57°07′39″N 2°51′34″W	Category B	49161	Upload Photo
Boig Farm (Outhouse Only)				57°09′24″N 2°52′34″W	Category B	16212	Upload Photo
Tarland, Kirklands Of Cromar (Former Tarland Manse) Including Walled Garden, Boundary Wall And Gatepiers				57°07′37″N 2°51′23″W	Category B	19789	Upload Photo
Tillychardoch House				57°08′06″N 2°49′30″W	Category B	16214	Upload Photo
Tarland, Whitely Burn Bridge				57°07′33″N 2°51′30″W	Category C(S)	16243	Upload Photo

== Key ==
The scheme for classifying buildings in Scotland is:

- Category A: "buildings of national or international importance, either architectural or historic; or fine, little-altered examples of some particular period, style or building type."
- Category B: "buildings of regional or more than local importance; or major examples of some particular period, style or building type, which may have been altered."
- Category C: "buildings of local importance; lesser examples of any period, style, or building type, as originally constructed or moderately altered; and simple traditional buildings which group well with other listed buildings."

In March 2016 there were 47,288 listed buildings in Scotland. Of these, 8% were Category A, and 50% were Category B, with the remaining 42% being Category C.

== See also ==
- List of listed buildings in Aberdeenshire
