= List of listed buildings in Banchory-Ternan =

This is a list of listed buildings in the parish of Banchory-Ternan in Aberdeenshire, Scotland.

== List ==
Name	Location	Date Listed	Grid Ref. (Note: Sometimes known as OSGB36, the grid reference (where provided) is based on the British national grid reference system used by the Ordnance Survey. • "Guide to National Grid". Ordnance Survey. • "Get-a-map". Ordnance Survey.)	Geo-coordinates	Notes	LB Number (Note: Historic Environment Scotland assign a unique alphanumeric identifier to each designated site in Scotland, for listed buildings this always begins with "LB", for example "LB12345".)	Image
Bridge Of Feugh, Toll-House				57°02′42″N 2°29′38″W	Category B	3256	Upload Photo
West Brathens Bridge Over Burn Of Canny				57°04′34″N 2°33′32″W	Category C(S)	3245	Upload Photo
Raemoir Hotel Annex - "The Ha'Hoose"				57°05′09″N 2°30′17″W	Category A	3247	Upload Photo
Birkwood House				57°03′13″N 2°28′30″W	Category B	3257	Upload Photo
Woodend House				57°03′15″N 2°36′34″W	Category B	3271	Upload Photo
Mill Of Hirn, Corn Mill				57°05′12″N 2°26′55″W	Category C(S)	3248	Upload Photo
Maryfield Farm House				57°03′06″N 2°27′49″W	Category C(S)	3251	Upload Photo
Knappach Farmhouse				57°02′54″N 2°26′42″W	Category B	3259	Upload Photo
Crathes - Doocot				57°03′36″N 2°26′20″W	Category B	3263	Upload Photo
Glassel House				57°05′02″N 2°34′08″W	Category C(S)	3272	Upload Photo
Cluny Crichton Castle				57°05′17″N 2°31′12″W	Category B	3246	Upload Photo
Bridge Of Feugh Over Water Of Feugh				57°02′42″N 2°29′35″W	Category B	3255	Upload Photo
Milton Of Crathes Old Bridge Over Burn Of Coy				57°03′23″N 2°25′31″W	Category B	3265	Upload Photo
Bridge Of Canny Over Burn Of Canny				57°03′50″N 2°34′22″W	Category C(S)	3270	Upload Photo
Tilquhillie Castle				57°02′15″N 2°27′36″W	Category A	38	Upload Photo
Raemoir Toll House, Kennerty				57°05′15″N 2°32′25″W	Category C(S)	3252	Upload Photo
Knappach Toll-House				57°03′12″N 2°27′21″W	Category B	3258	Upload Photo
West Lodge And Gatepiers Banchory Lodge Hotel				57°02′55″N 2°30′02″W	Category C(S)	3260	Upload Photo
Inchmarlo House				57°03′40″N 2°32′42″W	Category B	3268	Upload Photo
Mill Of Tilquhillie				57°02′33″N 2°27′32″W	Category C(S)	3261	Upload Photo
Crathes Castle				57°03′41″N 2°26′24″W	Category A	3262	Upload Photo
Crathes - East Lodge Bridge Over Burn Of Coy				57°03′27″N 2°25′33″W	Category C(S)	3264	Upload Photo
Milton Of Crathes Former Bridge Over Turnpike Road And Adjacent Lade Bridge				57°03′24″N 2°25′31″W	Category C(S)	3267	Upload Photo
Bridgefoot Bridge Over Burn Of Canny				57°03′39″N 2°33′41″W	Category C(S)	3269	Upload Photo
Mill Of Beltie Bridge Over Beltie Burn				57°05′04″N 2°34′34″W	Category C(S)	3244	Upload Photo
Raemoir House Hotel				57°05′08″N 2°30′18″W	Category B	3249	Upload Photo
Balbridie Farm House				57°03′07″N 2°26′02″W	Category C(S)	3250	Upload Photo
Suspension Bridge Over Feugh At Feugh Lodge				57°02′34″N 2°29′36″W	Category C(S)	3253	Upload Photo
Banchory Lodge Hotel				57°02′57″N 2°29′30″W	Category B	3254	Upload Photo
Milton Of Crathes Former Railway Bridge				57°03′23″N 2°25′31″W	Category C(S)	3266	Upload Photo
Glassel - Bridge Over Burn Of Canny				57°04′58″N 2°34′03″W	Category B	3273	Upload Photo

== Key ==
The scheme for classifying buildings in Scotland is:

- Category A: "buildings of national or international importance, either architectural or historic; or fine, little-altered examples of some particular period, style or building type."
- Category B: "buildings of regional or more than local importance; or major examples of some particular period, style or building type, which may have been altered."
- Category C: "buildings of local importance; lesser examples of any period, style, or building type, as originally constructed or moderately altered; and simple traditional buildings which group well with other listed buildings."

In March 2016 there were 47,288 listed buildings in Scotland. Of these, 8% were Category A, and 50% were Category B, with the remaining 42% being Category C.

== See also ==
- List of listed buildings in Aberdeenshire
