= List of listed buildings in Alvah, Aberdeenshire =

This is a list of listed buildings in the parish of Alvah in Aberdeenshire, Scotland.

== List ==
Name	Location	Date Listed	Grid Ref. (Note: Sometimes known as OSGB36, the grid reference (where provided) is based on the British national grid reference system used by the Ordnance Survey. • "Guide to National Grid". Ordnance Survey. • "Get-a-map". Ordnance Survey.)	Geo-coordinates	Notes	LB Number (Note: Historic Environment Scotland assign a unique alphanumeric identifier to each designated site in Scotland, for listed buildings this always begins with "LB", for example "LB12345".)	Image
Montcoffer House With Garden Walls And Gatepiers				57°38′25″N 2°31′45″W	Category B	6649	Upload Photo
Mountblairy Mausoleum With Memorial, Boundary Walls And Railings				57°35′11″N 2°31′09″W	Category B	6653	Upload Photo
North Burreldales				57°35′12″N 2°32′13″W	Category C(S)	6657	Upload Photo
Montcoffer Dovecot				57°38′25″N 2°31′32″W	Category B	2896	Upload Photo
Kirkton Of Alvah, The Manse, With Garden Walls And Gatepiers				57°37′50″N 2°32′27″W	Category C(S)	2892	Upload Photo
Montcoffer Steading				57°38′26″N 2°31′43″W	Category C(S)	6651	Upload Photo
Mountblairy Walled Garden				57°34′44″N 2°31′03″W	Category C(S)	6654	Upload Photo
Dunlugas Cottages				57°35′21″N 2°30′40″W	Category C(S)	2887	Upload Photo
Mains Of Auchinbadie				57°36′56″N 2°31′21″W	Category B	2893	Upload Photo
Mill Of Auchinbadie				57°36′49″N 2°31′16″W	Category B	2894	Upload Photo
Mountblairy Bridge				57°34′35″N 2°31′14″W	Category B	6656	Upload Photo
Dunlugas Bridge And Gatepiers				57°35′20″N 2°30′39″W	Category B	2886	Upload Photo
Beekie Cottage				57°39′39″N 2°29′40″W	Category C(S)	2882	Upload Photo
Corskie				57°39′15″N 2°30′06″W	Category B	2884	Upload Photo
Kirkton Of Alvah Church With Walled Graveyard, Gates And Gatepiers, And Ogilvy Burial Enclosure				57°37′52″N 2°32′26″W	Category B	2891	Upload Photo
Montcoffer Cottages				57°38′28″N 2°31′31″W	Category C(S)	2895	Upload Photo
Mountblairy Home Farm				57°34′44″N 2°31′08″W	Category B	6652	Upload Photo
Dunlugas, Walled Garden				57°35′28″N 2°33′45″W	Category C(S)	2889	Upload Photo
Mountblairy Gatepiers, Gates, Railings And Quadrant Walls				57°34′57″N 2°31′25″W	Category B	6655	Upload Photo
Rosieburn, Former Mission Hall				57°35′33″N 2°33′32″W	Category B	6658	Upload Photo
Dunlugas House				57°35′18″N 2°30′39″W	Category A	2888	Upload Photo
Montcoffer House, Game Larders				57°38′26″N 2°31′45″W	Category B	6650	Upload Photo
Bridge Of Alvah				57°38′18″N 2°32′14″W	Category A	2883	Upload Photo
Duff House, Fishing Temple				57°39′16″N 2°31′12″W	Category A	2885	Upload Photo
Gavenwood With Gatepiers				57°39′23″N 2°30′10″W	Category B	2890	Upload Photo

== Key ==
The scheme for classifying buildings in Scotland is:

- Category A: "buildings of national or international importance, either architectural or historic; or fine, little-altered examples of some particular period, style or building type."
- Category B: "buildings of regional or more than local importance; or major examples of some particular period, style or building type, which may have been altered."
- Category C: "buildings of local importance; lesser examples of any period, style, or building type, as originally constructed or moderately altered; and simple traditional buildings which group well with other listed buildings."

In March 2016 there were 47,288 listed buildings in Scotland. Of these, 8% were Category A, and 50% were Category B, with the remaining 42% being Category C.

== See also ==
- List of listed buildings in Aberdeenshire
