= List of listed buildings in Auchterless =

This is a list of listed buildings in the parish of Auchterless in Aberdeenshire, Scotland.

== List ==
Name	Location	Date Listed	Grid Ref. (Note: Sometimes known as OSGB36, the grid reference (where provided) is based on the British national grid reference system used by the Ordnance Survey. • "Guide to National Grid". Ordnance Survey. • "Get-a-map". Ordnance Survey.)	Geo-coordinates	Notes	LB Number (Note: Historic Environment Scotland assign a unique alphanumeric identifier to each designated site in Scotland, for listed buildings this always begins with "LB", for example "LB12345".)	Image
Home Farm Of Blackford, Dovecot				57°24′35″N 2°29′34″W	Category B	3027	Upload Photo
Mains Of Badenscoth, Fragment Of Old House, Outbuildings, Walled Garden With Barn On E. With Gatepiers				57°26′28″N 2°30′09″W	Category C(S)	3025	Upload Photo
Old Parish Church Of Auchterless (St. Donan)				57°27′51″N 2°28′44″W	Category B	3045	Upload another image See more images
Duff Of Hatton Mausoleum, Auchterless Churchyard				57°27′49″N 2°28′44″W	Category B	3019	Upload another image
Auchterless Churchyard				57°27′49″N 2°28′44″W	Category C(S)	3020	Upload Photo
Auchterless Parish Church				57°27′49″N 2°28′44″W	Category C(S)	3044	Upload another image See more images
Templand, Farmhouse				57°27′18″N 2°29′13″W	Category C(S)	3023	Upload Photo
New Mill, Mill				57°27′37″N 2°28′55″W	Category B	3022	Upload Photo
Netherthird Farmhouse				57°26′48″N 2°31′12″W	Category C(S)	3026	Upload Photo
Hatton Manor, Farmhouse				57°28′03″N 2°29′14″W	Category B	3021	Upload Photo
Knockleith House				57°27′13″N 2°29′45″W	Category C(S)	3024	Upload Photo

== Key ==
The scheme for classifying buildings in Scotland is:

- Category A: "buildings of national or international importance, either architectural or historic; or fine, little-altered examples of some particular period, style or building type."
- Category B: "buildings of regional or more than local importance; or major examples of some particular period, style or building type, which may have been altered."
- Category C: "buildings of local importance; lesser examples of any period, style, or building type, as originally constructed or moderately altered; and simple traditional buildings which group well with other listed buildings."

In March 2016 there were 47,288 listed buildings in Scotland. Of these, 8% were Category A, and 50% were Category B, with the remaining 42% being Category C.

== See also ==
- List of listed buildings in Aberdeenshire
