= List of listed buildings in Leochel-Cushnie, Aberdeenshire =

This is a list of listed buildings in the parish of Leochel-Cushnie in Aberdeenshire, Scotland.

== List ==
| Name | Location | Date Listed | Grid Ref. (Note: Sometimes known as OSGB36, the grid reference (where provided) is based on the British national grid reference system used by the Ordnance Survey. • "Guide to National Grid". Ordnance Survey. • "Get-a-map". Ordnance Survey.) | Geo-coordinates | Notes | LB Number (Note: Historic Environment Scotland assign a unique alphanumeric identifier to each designated site in Scotland, for listed buildings this always begins with "LB", for example "LB12345".) | Image |
|---|---|---|---|---|---|---|---|
| St. Bride's Churchyard | | | | 57°11′09″N 2°49′06″W | Category C(S) | 9221 | Upload Photo |
| Mains Of Craigievar House | | | | 57°10′29″N 2°43′09″W | Category B | 9230 | Upload Photo |
| Ladymill | | | | 57°11′48″N 2°43′06″W | Category B | 9232 | Upload Photo |
| Wester Ininteer, Farmhouse | | | | 57°12′06″N 2°45′24″W | Category C(S) | 9233 | Upload Photo |
| Castleknowe Of Lynturk | | | | 57°12′00″N 2°40′06″W | Category B | 9236 | Upload Photo |
| Hallhead, Mains Of Hallhead | | | | 57°10′13″N 2°47′15″W | Category A | 9218 | Upload Photo |
| Cushnie Lodge (Old House Of Cushnie) | | | | 57°11′24″N 2°47′19″W | Category B | 9223 | Upload Photo |
| Leochel-Cushnie Old School And Schoolhouse | | | | 57°11′30″N 2°39′43″W | Category B | 9224 | Upload Photo |
| Leochel Churchyard | | | | 57°10′31″N 2°44′45″W | Category C(S) | 9227 | Upload Photo |
| Kirkton Of Cushnie, House | | | | 57°11′07″N 2°49′05″W | Category B | 9222 | Upload Photo |
| Old Mains Of Cushnie | | | | 57°11′26″N 2°47′34″W | Category B | 9225 | Upload Photo |
| Leochel Church (Ruin) Kirkton Of Leochel | | | | 57°10′31″N 2°44′45″W | Category B | 9226 | Upload Photo |
| Manse Of Lynturk | | | | 57°12′02″N 2°42′43″W | Category C(S) | 9235 | Upload Photo |
| Mains Of Craigievar Coachhouse | | | | 57°10′29″N 2°43′09″W | Category C(S) | 9231 | Upload Photo |
| Lynturk, Farmhouse | | | | 57°11′57″N 2°39′57″W | Category C(S) | 9193 | Upload Photo |
| Milton Of Cairncoullie School | | | | 57°12′46″N 2°51′22″W | Category B | 9194 | Upload Photo |
| Mains Of Hallhead, Steading | | | | 57°10′14″N 2°47′14″W | Category B | 9219 | Upload Photo |
| Craigievar Castle | | | | 57°10′27″N 2°43′05″W | Category A | 9229 | Upload Photo |
| Lynturk Church | | | | 57°12′03″N 2°42′40″W | Category B | 9234 | Upload Photo |
| Manse | | | | 57°11′03″N 2°46′42″W | Category B | 9217 | Upload Photo |
| Kirkton Of Leochel Famhouse | | | | 57°10′30″N 2°44′43″W | Category C(S) | 9228 | Upload Photo |

== Key ==
The scheme for classifying buildings in Scotland is:

- Category A: "buildings of national or international importance, either architectural or historic; or fine, little-altered examples of some particular period, style or building type."
- Category B: "buildings of regional or more than local importance; or major examples of some particular period, style or building type, which may have been altered."
- Category C: "buildings of local importance; lesser examples of any period, style, or building type, as originally constructed or moderately altered; and simple traditional buildings which group well with other listed buildings."

In March 2016 there were 47,288 listed buildings in Scotland. Of these, 8% were Category A, and 50% were Category B, with the remaining 42% being Category C.

== See also ==
- List of listed buildings in Aberdeenshire
