= List of listed buildings in Gartly, Aberdeenshire =

This is a list of listed buildings in the parish of Gartly in Aberdeenshire, Scotland.

== List ==
Name	Location	Date Listed	Grid Ref. (Note: Sometimes known as OSGB36, the grid reference (where provided) is based on the British national grid reference system used by the Ordnance Survey. • "Guide to National Grid". Ordnance Survey. • "Get-a-map". Ordnance Survey.)	Geo-coordinates	Notes	LB Number (Note: Historic Environment Scotland assign a unique alphanumeric identifier to each designated site in Scotland, for listed buildings this always begins with "LB", for example "LB12345".)	Image
Mains Of Collithie Farmhouse				57°24′17″N 2°48′26″W	Category B	9202	Upload Photo
Kirkney Old Bridge Over Water Of Bogie				57°23′26″N 2°48′11″W	Category C(S)	9205	Upload Photo
Mill, Coynachie				57°23′47″N 2°50′56″W	Category B	9206	Upload Photo
The Riggin				57°24′11″N 2°47′25″W	Category B	9196	Upload Photo
Bogieview				57°22′43″N 2°47′54″W	Category C(S)	9200	Upload Photo
Doocot, Mains Of Gartly				57°23′25″N 2°46′42″W	Category B	9203	Upload Photo
West Manse, Gartly				57°24′35″N 2°48′27″W	Category C(S)	9201	Upload Photo
Parish Church Of Gartly				57°24′12″N 2°47′16″W	Category B	9195	Upload Photo
Manse Of Gartly (Known As Edinvillie)				57°24′21″N 2°47′23″W	Category B	9197	Upload Photo
(Formerly Manse Of Gartly, Offices) Edinville Offices				57°24′22″N 2°47′21″W	Category C(S)	9198	Upload Photo
Bridge Over Water Of Bogie Near Mill Of Gartly				57°24′32″N 2°47′55″W	Category C(S)	9199	Upload Photo
Culdrain House				57°23′31″N 2°48′16″W	Category B	9204	Upload Photo
Gartly Bridge				57°22′44″N 2°47′52″W	Category C(S)	48093	Upload Photo

== Key ==
The scheme for classifying buildings in Scotland is:

- Category A: "buildings of national or international importance, either architectural or historic; or fine, little-altered examples of some particular period, style or building type."
- Category B: "buildings of regional or more than local importance; or major examples of some particular period, style or building type, which may have been altered."
- Category C: "buildings of local importance; lesser examples of any period, style, or building type, as originally constructed or moderately altered; and simple traditional buildings which group well with other listed buildings."

In March 2016 there were 47,288 listed buildings in Scotland. Of these, 8% were Category A, and 50% were Category B, with the remaining 42% being Category C.

== See also ==
- List of listed buildings in Aberdeenshire
