= List of listed buildings in New Deer, Aberdeenshire =

This is a list of listed buildings in the parish of New Deer in Aberdeenshire, Scotland.

== List ==
Name	Location	Date Listed	Grid Ref. (Note: Sometimes known as OSGB36, the grid reference (where provided) is based on the British national grid reference system used by the Ordnance Survey. • "Guide to National Grid". Ordnance Survey. • "Get-a-map". Ordnance Survey.)	Geo-coordinates	Notes	LB Number (Note: Historic Environment Scotland assign a unique alphanumeric identifier to each designated site in Scotland, for listed buildings this always begins with "LB", for example "LB12345".)	Image
Old Maud Bridge Over South Ugie Water				57°31′29″N 2°07′16″W	Category C(S)	19781	Upload Photo
Bank Road, Maud Hospital, Including, Lodge, Gatepiers, Railings And Retaining Wall				57°31′06″N 2°07′37″W	Category B	19086	Upload Photo
Mains Of Fedderate; Farmhouse (2 Houses)				57°32′27″N 2°10′33″W	Category B	16159	Upload Photo
Brucklay Castle				57°32′29″N 2°09′02″W	Category C(S)	49988	Upload Photo
Brucklay Castle, Quadrant Walls And Gatepiers At West Lodge				57°32′04″N 2°10′10″W	Category C(S)	49991	Upload Photo
Brucklay Castle, Kennels, (Excluding Kennels Cottage)				57°32′33″N 2°08′51″W	Category C(S)	16150	Upload Photo
Brucklay Castle, Bridges To West And South Walled Garden				57°32′15″N 2°09′03″W	Category C(S)	49989	Upload Photo
Brucklay Castle, West Lodge				57°32′04″N 2°10′09″W	Category C(S)	49993	Upload Photo
New Deer Parish Church (St Kane)				57°30′45″N 2°11′31″W	Category B	16152	Upload Photo
Hill Of Culsh (Dingwall Fordyce) Monument				57°31′29″N 2°12′01″W	Category B	16156	Upload Photo
Brucklay Castle, Walled Garden Including Gates And Railings				57°32′17″N 2°09′02″W	Category B	49992	Upload Photo
10, 11 Gladstone Terrace, New Deer				57°30′42″N 2°11′26″W	Category C(S)	16155	Upload Photo
Brucklay Castle, West Quadrangle Of Stable-Block				57°32′33″N 2°08′55″W	Category B	19780	Upload Photo
Brucklay Castle, East Lodge, Gatepiers And Balustraded Dwarf Walls				57°32′50″N 2°08′09″W	Category B	16149	Upload Photo
St. Kane's Manse Sundial				57°30′44″N 2°11′24″W	Category C(S)	16154	Upload Photo
Brucklay Castle, Bridge Over Water Of Fedderate				57°32′26″N 2°09′28″W	Category C(S)	16161	Upload Photo
Savoch Of Deer Church				57°27′05″N 2°07′01″W	Category C(S)	16151	Upload Photo
God's Acre (Churchyard Of Deer)				57°30′43″N 2°11′31″W	Category C(S)	16153	Upload Photo
Station Road Joinery Works (Former Maud Auction Mart), Including Boundary Walls And Gatepiers				57°31′21″N 2°07′36″W	Category C(S)	49855	Upload Photo
Brucklay Castle, Private Burial Ground With Obelisk				57°32′17″N 2°08′55″W	Category C(S)	49990	Upload Photo
Fedderate Castle				57°32′19″N 2°10′26″W	Category B	16158	Upload Photo
Cairnbanno House (Now Farmhouse)				57°29′19″N 2°15′24″W	Category B	16160	Upload Photo
Mill Of Auchreddie				57°30′45″N 2°10′59″W	Category C(S)	16157	Upload Photo

== Key ==
The scheme for classifying buildings in Scotland is:

- Category A: "buildings of national or international importance, either architectural or historic; or fine, little-altered examples of some particular period, style or building type."
- Category B: "buildings of regional or more than local importance; or major examples of some particular period, style or building type, which may have been altered."
- Category C: "buildings of local importance; lesser examples of any period, style, or building type, as originally constructed or moderately altered; and simple traditional buildings which group well with other listed buildings."

In March 2016 there were 47,288 listed buildings in Scotland. Of these, 8% were Category A, and 50% were Category B, with the remaining 42% being Category C.

== See also ==
- List of listed buildings in Aberdeenshire
