= List of listed buildings in Lumphanan, Aberdeenshire =

This is a list of listed buildings in the parish of Lumphanan in Aberdeenshire, Scotland.

== List ==
Name	Location	Date Listed	Grid Ref. (Note: Sometimes known as OSGB36, the grid reference (where provided) is based on the British national grid reference system used by the Ordnance Survey. • "Guide to National Grid". Ordnance Survey. • "Get-a-map". Ordnance Survey.)	Geo-coordinates	Notes	LB Number (Note: Historic Environment Scotland assign a unique alphanumeric identifier to each designated site in Scotland, for listed buildings this always begins with "LB", for example "LB12345".)	Image
Camphill House				57°09′27″N 2°42′45″W	Category C(S)	9274	Upload Photo
Mill Of Kintocher				57°10′15″N 2°42′44″W	Category C(S)	9276	Upload Photo
Manse Of Lumphanan				57°07′25″N 2°41′42″W	Category C(S)	9279	Upload Photo
Manse Offices				57°07′26″N 2°41′41″W	Category C(S)	9281	Upload Photo
Parish Church Of St Finan				57°07′25″N 2°41′44″W	Category B	9277	Upload Photo
Stothert Memorial Church (Former Free Church) Lumphanan				57°07′56″N 2°41′26″W	Category C(S)	9282	Upload Photo
Glenmillan Doocot				57°08′16″N 2°40′16″W	Category C(S)	9272	Upload Photo
Manse Walled Garden				57°07′24″N 2°41′44″W	Category C(S)	9280	Upload Photo
A F Law, House And Shop Lumphanan				57°07′40″N 2°41′16″W	Category C(S)	9284	Upload Photo
Glenmillan House				57°08′14″N 2°40′24″W	Category C(S)	9271	Upload Photo
St Finan's Churchyard				57°07′25″N 2°41′44″W	Category C(S)	9278	Upload Photo
Macbeth Arms Hotel Lumphanan				57°07′40″N 2°41′17″W	Category C(S)	9283	Upload Photo
Milton Of Auchinhove, House Now Pigsty				57°06′39″N 2°44′15″W	Category C(S)	9286	Upload Photo
Findrack House Walled Garden And Doocot				57°08′00″N 2°38′54″W	Category B	9287	Upload Photo
Lodge To Findrack House				57°08′18″N 2°38′29″W	Category C(S)	9288	Upload Photo
Auchlossan, House				57°06′28″N 2°42′41″W	Category B	13719	Upload Photo
Burnside, Steading				57°08′33″N 2°42′40″W	Category C(S)	9273	Upload Photo
Auchlossan Steading				57°06′29″N 2°42′39″W	Category C(S)	9285	Upload Photo

== Key ==
The scheme for classifying buildings in Scotland is:

- Category A: "buildings of national or international importance, either architectural or historic; or fine, little-altered examples of some particular period, style or building type."
- Category B: "buildings of regional or more than local importance; or major examples of some particular period, style or building type, which may have been altered."
- Category C: "buildings of local importance; lesser examples of any period, style, or building type, as originally constructed or moderately altered; and simple traditional buildings which group well with other listed buildings."

In March 2016 there were 47,288 listed buildings in Scotland. Of these, 8% were Category A, and 50% were Category B, with the remaining 42% being Category C.

== See also ==
- List of listed buildings in Aberdeenshire
