= List of listed buildings in Rayne, Aberdeenshire =

This is a list of listed buildings in the parish of Rayne in Aberdeenshire, Scotland.

== List ==
Name	Location	Date Listed	Grid Ref. (Note: Sometimes known as OSGB36, the grid reference (where provided) is based on the British national grid reference system used by the Ordnance Survey. • "Guide to National Grid". Ordnance Survey. • "Get-a-map". Ordnance Survey.)	Geo-coordinates	Notes	LB Number (Note: Historic Environment Scotland assign a unique alphanumeric identifier to each designated site in Scotland, for listed buildings this always begins with "LB", for example "LB12345".)	Image
The Ploughman's Society Hall				57°21′12″N 2°32′28″W	Category B	16003	Upload Photo
Freefield House				57°22′16″N 2°32′24″W	Category B	16001	Upload Photo
Rayne Parish Church Kirktown Of Rayne				57°21′41″N 2°30′15″W	Category B	16017	Upload Photo
Warthill House				57°22′24″N 2°28′52″W	Category B	16018	Upload Photo
Mill Of Bonnyton				57°21′12″N 2°31′42″W	Category B	16002	Upload Photo
Market Cross, Old Rayne				57°20′39″N 2°32′32″W	Category A	16019	Upload Photo

== Key ==
The scheme for classifying buildings in Scotland is:

- Category A: "buildings of national or international importance, either architectural or historic; or fine, little-altered examples of some particular period, style or building type."
- Category B: "buildings of regional or more than local importance; or major examples of some particular period, style or building type, which may have been altered."
- Category C: "buildings of local importance; lesser examples of any period, style, or building type, as originally constructed or moderately altered; and simple traditional buildings which group well with other listed buildings."

In March 2016 there were 47,288 listed buildings in Scotland. Of these, 8% were Category A, and 50% were Category B, with the remaining 42% being Category C.

== See also ==
- List of listed buildings in Aberdeenshire
