= List of listed buildings in Methlick, Aberdeenshire =

This is a list of listed buildings in the parish of Methlick in Aberdeenshire, Scotland.

== List ==
Name	Location	Date listed	Geo-coordinates	Notes	Category	LB number	Image
Haddo House Burial Enclosure			57°24′13″N 2°12′42″W		C(S)	16458	Upload Photo
Methlick Old Parish Church (St. Deavanach)			57°25′34″N 2°14′19″W		B	16460	Upload Photo
Little Ardo Farmhouse, S. Section Only			57°26′16″N 2°14′33″W		C(S)	16466	Upload Photo
Haddo House Fountain			57°24′10″N 2°13′11″W		C(S)	16471	Upload Photo
Haddo House, Monument To Col. Sir Alexander Gordon			57°23′57″N 2°13′11″W		B	16476	Upload Photo
Methlick Old Parish Church Churchyard			57°25′33″N 2°14′19″W		C(S)	16461	Upload Photo
Ivy Cottage Methlick Village			57°25′37″N 2°14′37″W		C(S)	16465	Upload Photo
Haddo House, Walled Garden			57°24′11″N 2°13′48″W		B	16477	Upload Photo
Haddo House Gardens Cottage			57°24′07″N 2°13′48″W		C(S)	16478	Upload Photo
Haddo Estate, The Pheasantry			57°23′56″N 2°12′53″W		B	46161	Upload Photo
Tanglandford, Tanglandford Bridge			57°24′54″N 2°11′18″W		B	19627	Upload Photo
Manse Of Methlick			57°25′26″N 2°14′19″W		C(S)	16463	Upload Photo
Bridgend, Methlick Village			57°25′32″N 2°14′26″W		B	16464	Upload Photo
Haddo House Stable And Coachhouse Block S. Of House			57°24′07″N 2°13′17″W		C(S)	16475	Upload Photo
The Laundry, Haddo			57°24′49″N 2°12′40″W		C(S)	16469	Upload Photo
Haddo House Sundial S.E. Of Fountain			57°24′10″N 2°13′10″W		C(S)	16472	Upload Photo
Methlick New Parish Church			57°25′31″N 2°14′19″W		B	16462	Upload Photo
Haddo House Balustrades Flanking S.E. Avenue			57°24′10″N 2°13′10″W		C(S)	16473	Upload Photo
Haddo House, Butler's House			57°24′07″N 2°13′55″W		C(S)	16459	Upload Photo
Haddo House Sundial On S. Lawn			57°24′10″N 2°13′14″W		B	16474	Upload Photo
Haddo House Ice-House			57°24′00″N 2°13′27″W		C(S)	16479	Upload Photo
Methlick Bridge Over River Ythan			57°25′42″N 2°14′22″W		B	16467	Upload Photo
North Lodge			57°24′51″N 2°12′54″W		C(S)	16468	Upload Photo
Haddo House			57°24′11″N 2°13′14″W		A	16470	Upload Photo
Haddo House Hall			57°24′08″N 2°13′18″W		B	51410	Upload Photo

== Key ==
The scheme for classifying buildings in Scotland is:

- Category A: "buildings of national or international importance, either architectural or historic; or fine, little-altered examples of some particular period, style or building type."
- Category B: "buildings of regional or more than local importance; or major examples of some particular period, style or building type, which may have been altered."
- Category C: "buildings of local importance; lesser examples of any period, style, or building type, as originally constructed or moderately altered; and simple traditional buildings which group well with other listed buildings."

In March 2016 there were 47,288 listed buildings in Scotland. Of these, 8% were Category A, and 50% were Category B, with the remaining 42% being Category C.

== See also ==
- List of listed buildings in Aberdeenshire
