= List of listed buildings in Maryculter, Aberdeenshire =

This is a list of listed buildings in the parish of Maryculter in Aberdeenshire, Scotland.

== List ==
Name	Location	Date Listed	Grid Ref. (Note: Sometimes known as OSGB36, the grid reference (where provided) is based on the British national grid reference system used by the Ordnance Survey. • "Guide to National Grid". Ordnance Survey. • "Get-a-map". Ordnance Survey.)	Geo-coordinates	Notes	LB Number (Note: Historic Environment Scotland assign a unique alphanumeric identifier to each designated site in Scotland, for listed buildings this always begins with "LB", for example "LB12345".)	Image
Blairs St Mary's College New College				57°05′55″N 2°11′43″W	Category B	19225	Upload Photo
Blairs College Lodge And Gatepiers				57°06′06″N 2°11′32″W	Category C(S)	19228	Upload Photo
Altries Bridge Over Tilbouries Burn				57°04′35″N 2°16′13″W	Category C(S)	16480	Upload Photo
Maryculter Parish Kirk				57°05′03″N 2°14′15″W	Category B	16486	Upload Photo
Parish Kirk Manse				57°05′06″N 2°14′14″W	Category C(S)	16487	Upload Photo
Kingcausie House				57°05′28″N 2°13′40″W	Category B	16489	Upload Photo
Kingcausie House - Sundial (2)				57°05′27″N 2°13′38″W	Category C(S)	16491	Upload Photo
Old Maryculter House (Now Incorporated Into Deeside Hotel)				57°05′23″N 2°15′32″W	Category B	16496	Upload Photo
Crynoch Mill				57°04′03″N 2°13′39″W	Category C(S)	16484	Upload Photo
Eastland House				57°05′11″N 2°13′42″W	Category C(S)	16493	Upload Photo
Maryculter Old Manse				57°05′26″N 2°15′21″W	Category B	16499	Upload Photo
Kingcausie House - Aberdeen Lodge And Gates				57°05′54″N 2°13′10″W	Category B	16492	Upload Photo
Crynoch Mill Bridge Over Crynoch Burn				57°04′00″N 2°13′43″W	Category C(S)	16485	Upload Photo
Blairs College New Chapel				57°05′57″N 2°11′39″W	Category A	19227	Upload Photo
Blairs College Walled Garden And Gardener's Cottage				57°05′51″N 2°11′46″W	Category B	19229	Upload another image
Blairs College - Doocot				57°05′51″N 2°11′37″W	Category B	16482	Upload Photo
Auchlunies House				57°05′20″N 2°10′57″W	Category B	16483	Upload Photo
Milton Bridge Over Crynoch Burn				57°05′31″N 2°14′09″W	Category C(S)	16495	Upload Photo
Blairs College Menzies House				57°05′54″N 2°11′40″W	Category B	19226	Upload Photo
Mill Inn - Old Corn Mill				57°05′31″N 2°14′15″W	Category C(S)	16494	Upload another image See more images
Old Parish Kirkyard Walls				57°05′26″N 2°15′31″W	Category B	16498	Upload Photo
"Camp Cottage", Kirkton Of Maryculter				57°05′01″N 2°14′15″W	Category C(S)	16488	Upload Photo
Maryculter Old Parish Kirk				57°05′26″N 2°15′31″W	Category B	16497	Upload Photo
Blairs College, St Mary's Old Chapel And Menzies' Apartments				57°05′53″N 2°11′39″W	Category B	16481	Upload Photo
Kingcausie House - Sundial (1)				57°05′27″N 2°13′38″W	Category B	16490	Upload Photo

== Key ==
The scheme for classifying buildings in Scotland is:

- Category A: "buildings of national or international importance, either architectural or historic; or fine, little-altered examples of some particular period, style or building type."
- Category B: "buildings of regional or more than local importance; or major examples of some particular period, style or building type, which may have been altered."
- Category C: "buildings of local importance; lesser examples of any period, style, or building type, as originally constructed or moderately altered; and simple traditional buildings which group well with other listed buildings."

In March 2016 there were 47,288 listed buildings in Scotland. Of these, 8% were Category A, and 50% were Category B, with the remaining 42% being Category C.

== See also ==
- List of listed buildings in Aberdeenshire
