= List of listed buildings in Meldrum, Aberdeenshire =

This is a list of listed buildings in the parish of Meldrum in Aberdeenshire, Scotland.

== List ==
Name	Location	Date Listed	Grid Ref. (Note: Sometimes known as OSGB36, the grid reference (where provided) is based on the British national grid reference system used by the Ordnance Survey. • "Guide to National Grid". Ordnance Survey. • "Get-a-map". Ordnance Survey.)	Geo-coordinates	Notes	LB Number (Note: Historic Environment Scotland assign a unique alphanumeric identifier to each designated site in Scotland, for listed buildings this always begins with "LB", for example "LB12345".)	Image
Meldrum House, South Gates				57°20′38″N 2°18′55″W	Category B	16227	Upload another image
Meldrum Mausoleum, Bethelnie, On Site Of Old Parish Church				57°22′17″N 2°21′24″W	Category C(S)	16246	Upload Photo
Weigh Office And Cart Shed, Oldmeldrum Station				57°20′00″N 2°19′39″W	Category B	49907	Upload Photo
Meldrum House				57°21′06″N 2°18′45″W	Category B	16247	Upload another image
Former Platform Building, Oldmeldrum Station				57°20′03″N 2°19′41″W	Category C(S)	49908	Upload Photo
Bethelnie Steading				57°21′49″N 2°21′33″W	Category B	19791	Upload Photo
St. Matthew's Episcopal Church, Old Meldrum				57°20′29″N 2°18′51″W	Category B	16228	Upload Photo
Mill Of Foresterhill				57°21′16″N 2°17′15″W	Category B	16229	Upload another image See more images
Kilblean, House And Garden Walls				57°20′43″N 2°16′32″W	Category B	16230	Upload Photo
Meldrum House Pair Of Garden Houses At S.E. Of House				57°21′06″N 2°18′42″W	Category B	19787	Upload another image
Meldrum House Outer Gate And Stable And Coachhouse Block				57°21′07″N 2°18′50″W	Category A	16225	Upload another image See more images
Cromlet House, Outbuildings				57°19′53″N 2°18′54″W	Category C(S)	16232	Upload Photo
Meldrum House, South Lodge				57°20′38″N 2°18′55″W	Category C(S)	16226	Upload Photo
Cromlet House				57°19′52″N 2°18′53″W	Category B	16231	Upload Photo

== Key ==
The scheme for classifying buildings in Scotland is:

- Category A: "buildings of national or international importance, either architectural or historic; or fine, little-altered examples of some particular period, style or building type."
- Category B: "buildings of regional or more than local importance; or major examples of some particular period, style or building type, which may have been altered."
- Category C: "buildings of local importance; lesser examples of any period, style, or building type, as originally constructed or moderately altered; and simple traditional buildings which group well with other listed buildings."

In March 2016 there were 47,288 listed buildings in Scotland. Of these, 8% were Category A, and 50% were Category B, with the remaining 42% being Category C.

== See also ==
- List of listed buildings in Aberdeenshire
