= List of listed buildings in St Cyrus, Aberdeenshire =

This is a list of listed buildings in the parish of St Cyrus in Aberdeenshire, Scotland.

== List ==
Name	Location	Date Listed	Grid Ref. (Note: Sometimes known as OSGB36, the grid reference (where provided) is based on the British national grid reference system used by the Ordnance Survey. • "Guide to National Grid". Ordnance Survey. • "Get-a-map". Ordnance Survey.)	Geo-coordinates	Notes	LB Number (Note: Historic Environment Scotland assign a unique alphanumeric identifier to each designated site in Scotland, for listed buildings this always begins with "LB", for example "LB12345".)	Image
Parish Church Of Garvock-St Cyrus, Including Area Walls, Churchyard Gates And Railings, And Remains Of Previous Church				56°46′26″N 2°24′36″W	Category B	16317	Upload Photo
Ecclesgreig House Including Terraces, Steps, And Graden Ornaments				56°47′01″N 2°25′50″W	Category B	16323	Upload Photo
Denfinella Bridge				56°47′22″N 2°22′32″W	Category B	16327	Upload Photo
Kaim Of Mathers				56°46′31″N 2°23′22″W	Category C(S)	16322	Upload Photo
Bervie Branch Railway Viaduct Over North Esk				56°45′04″N 2°27′04″W	Category B	16331	Upload another image
Burnside, St Cyrus				56°46′32″N 2°25′02″W	Category C(S)	16321	Upload Photo
Lauriston Castle				56°47′25″N 2°23′33″W	Category C(S)	16324	Upload Photo
Mill Of Morphy House				56°45′22″N 2°28′12″W	Category B	16329	Upload Photo
Main Road, St Cyrus Church Hall Including Boundary Walls				56°46′31″N 2°24′54″W	Category C(S)	49198	Upload Photo
St Cyrus School				56°46′24″N 2°24′40″W	Category B	16318	Upload Photo
Manse Of Garvock-St Cyrus, St Cyrus				56°46′19″N 2°24′47″W	Category C(S)	16319	Upload Photo
Churchgate Cottage (T B Craig) Near Garvock-St Cyrus Church On North				56°46′27″N 2°24′41″W	Category C(S)	16320	Upload Photo
Woodston Fishing Station, Former Skipper's Quarters, Bothy And Ice House				56°46′30″N 2°23′59″W	Category B	47357	Upload Photo
Forebank House Including Steading Outbuildings, Garden Walls Railings And Gates				56°46′23″N 2°29′27″W	Category A	16328	Upload Photo
East Mathers Farmhouse				56°47′11″N 2°21′49″W	Category C(S)	16325	Upload Photo
Nether Warburton Cottages				56°45′26″N 2°26′22″W	Category C(S)	49977	Upload Photo
East Mathers Steading				56°47′15″N 2°21′51″W	Category B	16326	Upload Photo
Lower North Water Bridge Over North Esk, Including Approaches				56°45′01″N 2°27′07″W	Category A	16330	Upload another image See more images
Kirkside House Dovecot				56°45′49″N 2°25′50″W	Category B	16333	Upload Photo
Kirkside House Including Garden Walls And Gates				56°45′50″N 2°25′44″W	Category B	16332	Upload Photo
Kirkside House Gatepiers				56°46′06″N 2°25′59″W	Category C(S)	16334	Upload Photo
Rock Hall Fishing Station, Including Ice House				56°46′31″N 2°23′04″W	Category B	45911	Upload Photo

== Key ==
The scheme for classifying buildings in Scotland is:

- Category A: "buildings of national or international importance, either architectural or historic; or fine, little-altered examples of some particular period, style or building type."
- Category B: "buildings of regional or more than local importance; or major examples of some particular period, style or building type, which may have been altered."
- Category C: "buildings of local importance; lesser examples of any period, style, or building type, as originally constructed or moderately altered; and simple traditional buildings which group well with other listed buildings."

In March 2016 there were 47,288 listed buildings in Scotland. Of these, 8% were Category A, and 50% were Category B, with the remaining 42% being Category C.

== See also ==
- List of listed buildings in Aberdeenshire
