= List of listed buildings in Inverkeithny, Aberdeenshire =

This is a list of listed buildings in the parish of Inverkeithny in Aberdeenshire, Scotland.

== List ==
Name	Location	Date Listed	Grid Ref. (Note: Sometimes known as OSGB36, the grid reference (where provided) is based on the British national grid reference system used by the Ordnance Survey. • "Guide to National Grid". Ordnance Survey. • "Get-a-map". Ordnance Survey.)	Geo-coordinates	Notes	LB Number (Note: Historic Environment Scotland assign a unique alphanumeric identifier to each designated site in Scotland, for listed buildings this always begins with "LB", for example "LB12345".)	Image
Inverkeithny Parish Church And Graveyard Walls				57°30′45″N 2°37′13″W	Category B	13593	Upload Photo
Inverkeithny Row Of 4 Cottages				57°30′40″N 2°37′17″W	Category C(S)	13594	Upload Photo
Inverkeithny Schoolhouse				57°30′41″N 2°37′15″W	Category B	13595	Upload Photo
Midtown Of Haddo				57°30′41″N 2°37′51″W	Category B	13596	Upload Photo
Haddo, Walled Garden				57°30′17″N 2°38′05″W	Category B	9640	Upload Photo
Haddo House North Lodge With Gates Quadrant And Boundary Walls				57°30′40″N 2°37′27″W	Category C(S)	9639	Upload Photo
Haddo House, Dovecot				57°30′15″N 2°38′05″W	Category C(S)	9638	Upload Photo
Inverkeithny, Bridge Over Keithny Burn				57°30′40″N 2°37′32″W	Category B	9641	Upload Photo

== Key ==
The scheme for classifying buildings in Scotland is:

- Category A: "buildings of national or international importance, either architectural or historic; or fine, little-altered examples of some particular period, style or building type."
- Category B: "buildings of regional or more than local importance; or major examples of some particular period, style or building type, which may have been altered."
- Category C: "buildings of local importance; lesser examples of any period, style, or building type, as originally constructed or moderately altered; and simple traditional buildings which group well with other listed buildings."

In March 2016 there were 47,288 listed buildings in Scotland. Of these, 8% were Category A, and 50% were Category B, with the remaining 42% being Category C.

== See also ==
- List of listed buildings in Aberdeenshire
