= List of Category A listed buildings in Aberdeenshire =

Aberdeenshire shown within Scotland

This is a list of Category A listed buildings in Aberdeenshire, north-east Scotland.

In Scotland, the term listed building refers to a building or other structure officially designated as being of "special architectural or historic interest". Category A structures are those considered to be "buildings of national or international importance, either architectural or historic, or fine little-altered examples of some particular period, style or building type." Listing was begun by a provision in the Town and Country Planning (Scotland) Act 1947, and the current legislative basis for listing is the Planning (Listed Buildings and Conservation Areas) (Scotland) Act 1997. The authority for listing rests with Historic Scotland, an executive agency of the Scottish Government, which inherited this role from the Scottish Development Department in 1991. Once listed, severe restrictions are imposed on the modifications allowed to a building's structure or its fittings. Listed building consent must be obtained from local authorities prior to any alteration to such a structure. There are approximately 47,400 listed buildings in Scotland, of which around 8% (some 3,800) are Category A.

The council area of Aberdeenshire covers 6,313 square kilometres (2,437 sq mi), and has a population of around 245,800. There are 195 Category A listed buildings in the area.

== Listed buildings ==
Name	Location	Date listed	Geo-coordinates	Notes	LB number	Image
Arbuthnott House, North Bridge over Arbuthnott Burn	Arbuthnott		56°52′02″N 2°20′16″W		31	Upload another image See more images
Braemar Castle	Braemar		57°00′53″N 3°23′29″W		36	Upload another image See more images
Tilquhillie Castle	Banchory		57°02′15″N 2°27′36″W		38	Upload another image See more images
Park Bridge over River Dee	Drumoak		57°04′27″N 2°20′14″W		45	Upload another image See more images
Old Parish Church of Auchindoir	Auchindoir, Lumsden		57°18′31″N 2°52′07″W		2732	Upload another image See more images
Craig Castle	Auchindoir, Lumsden		57°18′39″N 2°52′49″W		2736	Upload Photo
Druminnor Castle	Rhynie		57°19′32″N 2°48′36″W		2743	Upload another image See more images
Aberdour House	New Aberdour		57°39′55″N 2°09′10″W		2768	Upload Photo
Orrok (or Orrock) House	Balmedie	16 April 1971	57°16′00″N 2°03′41″W		2778	Upload another image
Mounie Castle, original block	Daviot		57°20′53″N 2°23′22″W		2793	Upload another image See more images
Benholm Castle	Benholm, Gourdon		56°49′30″N 2°19′22″W		2807	Upload Photo
Benholm Parish Church	Kirktown of Benholm, Gourdon		56°48′52″N 2°19′19″W		2813	Upload another image See more images
Bourtie Parish Church	Bourtie, Oldmeldrum	16 April 1971	57°18′50″N 2°19′34″W		2815	Upload another image See more images
Bourtie House	Bourtie, Oldmeldrum	16 April 1971	57°18′23″N 2°21′28″W		2819	Upload another image See more images
Barra Castle	Bourtie, Oldmeldrum	16 April 1971	57°19′19″N 2°20′48″W		2821	Upload another image See more images
Pitcaple Castle	Pitcaple, Garioch		57°19′28″N 2°27′16″W		2830	Upload Photo
Chapel of Garioch, Churchyard Gateway (Pittodrie's Yate)	Garioch		57°18′25″N 2°28′23″W		2846	Upload another image See more images
Arbuthnott Parish Kirk	Arbuthnott		56°51′46″N 2°19′38″W		2876	Upload another image See more images
Allardyce Castle	Inverbervie		56°51′24″N 2°18′04″W		2878	Upload another image See more images
Allardyce Castle - Gate Piers	Inverbervie		56°51′23″N 2°18′04″W		2879	Upload Photo
Arbuthnott House	Arbuthnott		56°52′00″N 2°20′16″W		2880	Upload another image See more images
Bridge of Alvah	Over River Deveron, Banff		57°38′18″N 2°32′14″W		2883	Upload another image See more images
Fishing Temple, Duff House	Banff		57°39′16″N 2°31′12″W		2885	Upload another image
Dunlugas House	Turriff		57°35′18″N 2°30′39″W		2888	Upload another image
Dunnottar Castle - Keep	Stonehaven		56°56′45″N 2°11′53″W		2898	Upload another image See more images
Dunnottar Castle - Entrance Gateway and Guardrooms	Stonehaven		56°56′46″N 2°11′54″W		2919	Upload another image See more images
Dunnottar Castle - Benholm's Lodgings	Stonehaven		56°56′46″N 2°11′54″W		2920	Upload another image See more images
Castle Fraser	Kemnay		57°12′11″N 2°27′38″W		2924	Upload another image See more images
Castle Fraser, stable block	Kemnay		57°12′07″N 2°27′52″W		2925	Upload another image See more images
Castle Fraser, sundial	Kemnay		57°12′11″N 2°27′34″W		2927	Upload Photo
Fraser Mausoleum, Old Churchyard of Cluny	Sauchen		57°12′10″N 2°31′24″W		2947	Upload another image
Old Churchyard of Cluny	Sauchen		57°12′10″N 2°31′24″W		2948	Upload another image
Cluny Castle	Sauchen		57°12′16″N 2°30′59″W		2949	Upload another image See more images
Tillycairn Castle	Sauchen		57°11′33″N 2°33′22″W		2959	Upload Photo
Culsalmond Old Parish Church	Kirkton of Culsalmond, Huntly		57°23′08″N 2°35′01″W		2960	Upload another image See more images
Crathie Suspension Bridge over River Dee	Crathie		57°02′01″N 3°12′40″W		2988	Upload another image See more images
Crathie Girder Bridge over River Dee	Crathie		57°02′22″N 3°13′03″W		2989	Upload another image See more images
Abergeldie Castle	Deeside		57°02′35″N 3°10′36″W		3005	Upload another image See more images
Auchanachie Castle	Ruthven		57°30′35″N 2°50′19″W		3016	Upload Photo
Parish Church of Crimond	Crimond	16 April 1971	57°36′03″N 1°54′41″W		3028	Upload another image See more images
Haddo House, Mains of Haddo	Tarves		57°24′11″N 2°13′16″W		3034	Upload another image See more images
Finzean Sawmill and Turning Mill	Finzean		57°00′49″N 2°40′29″W		3046	Upload another image
Inchdrewer Castle	Banff		57°38′06″N 2°34′40″W		3049	Upload another image See more images
Potarch Bridge over River Dee	Potarch, Kincardine O'Neil		57°03′55″N 2°38′55″W		3095	Upload another image See more images
Finzean Bucket Mill	Finzean		57°00′36″N 2°41′50″W		3100	Upload another image
Park House	Drumoak		57°04′06″N 2°21′52″W		3103	Upload another image
Drum Castle	Drumoak		57°05′42″N 2°20′17″W		3113	Upload another image See more images
Rhu-Na-Haven	Aboyne, Rhu-Na-Haven Road		57°04′05″N 2°48′10″W		3126	Upload another image
Dunecht House	Dunecht		57°09′39″N 2°24′49″W		3133	Upload another image See more images
Echt Parish Church	Echt		57°08′28″N 2°25′58″W		3152	Upload another image See more images
Raemoir Hotel Annex - The Ha'hoose	Banchory		57°05′09″N 2°30′17″W		3247	Upload another image
Crathes Castle	Banchory		57°03′41″N 2°26′24″W		3262	Upload another image See more images
Balfluig Castle	Alford		57°13′27″N 2°41′12″W		3278	Upload another image See more images
St Margaret's Episcopal Church	Braemar, Castleton Terrace		57°00′21″N 3°23′50″W		6266	Upload another image See more images
South Colleonard	Banff		57°39′10″N 2°33′39″W		6662	Upload another image
Gairnshiel Bridge over River Gairn	Gairnshiel Lodge, Ballater		57°05′36″N 3°09′55″W		6747	Upload another image See more images
Castle of Fiddes	Fiddes, Stonehaven		56°55′21″N 2°17′25″W		6753	Upload Photo
Balbegno Castle	Fettercairn		56°50′49″N 2°35′34″W		6754	Upload another image See more images
Market Cross of Fettercairn	Fettercairn, The Square		56°51′07″N 2°34′29″W		6755	Upload another image
Findlater Castle, Dovecote	Sandend		57°41′17″N 2°46′24″W		6759	Upload another image See more images
Glassaugh Windmill	Sandend		57°40′45″N 2°44′21″W		6761	Upload another image
Bridge of Keig over River Don	Keig		57°15′26″N 2°38′06″W		9057	Upload Photo
House of Aquahorthies former Aquahorthies College	Aquhorthies, Burnhervie, Inverurie		57°16′12″N 2°27′04″W		9073	Upload Photo
Auchmacoy Dovecot	Ellon	16 April 1971	57°22′24″N 2°01′07″W		9089	Upload another image See more images
Kildrummy Parish Church	Kildrummy		57°14′45″N 2°52′34″W		9093	Upload another image See more images
Kildrummy Castle	Kildrummy		57°14′06″N 2°54′17″W		9098	Upload another image See more images
Nether Ardgrain, Farmhouse	Ellon	16 April 1971	57°23′46″N 2°04′48″W		9106	Upload another image See more images
Old Parish Church	Kirkton of Glenbuchat, Strathdon		57°13′22″N 3°02′08″W		9126	Upload another image See more images
Glenbuchat Castle	Glenbuchat, Strathdon		57°13′14″N 3°00′00″W		9129	Upload another image See more images
Keith Hall	Inverurie		57°16′51″N 2°21′12″W		9136	Upload Photo
Balbithan House	Kintore		57°15′37″N 2°18′47″W		9140	Upload Photo
Beldorney Castle	River Deveron, west of Huntly		57°25′10″N 2°57′47″W		9164	Upload another image See more images
Foveran Parish Church Turing Slab	Foveran		57°18′28″N 2°01′36″W		9166	Upload Photo
Leith Hall	Kennethmont, Rhynie		57°21′23″N 2°45′53″W		9183	Upload another image See more images
Kemnay House	Kemnay		57°13′42″N 2°26′34″W		9212	Upload another image See more images
Mains of Hallhead	Hallhead		57°10′13″N 2°47′15″W		9218	Upload another image
Craigievar Castle	Alford		57°10′27″N 2°43′05″W		9229	Upload another image See more images
Cairness House	Fraserburgh	16 April 1971	57°38′17″N 1°56′15″W		9263	Upload another image See more images
Cairness House, Lodges and Gates	Fraserburgh	16 April 1971	57°38′21″N 1°56′00″W		9264	Upload another image See more images
Crimonmogate House	Crimond	16 April 1971	57°37′06″N 1°56′05″W		9270	Upload another image See more images
Muchalls Castle	Muchalls		57°01′03″N 2°10′47″W		9352	Upload another image See more images
Craigston Castle	Turriff		57°35′05″N 2°23′58″W		9392	Upload another image See more images
Old Parish Church of Longside	Longside	16 April 1971	57°30′55″N 1°56′21″W		9410	Upload another image See more images
Churchyard Gateway, Longside Parish Church	Longside, Inn Brae	16 April 1971	57°30′56″N 1°56′21″W		9412	Upload another image See more images
Frendraught House	Glen Dronach, Aberchirder		57°27′56″N 2°38′01″W		9449	Upload another image See more images
Balbegno Castle Garden And Terrace Walls And Gatepiers	Fettercairn		56°50′48″N 2°35′34″W		9495	Upload Photo
Balbegno Castle, Dovecot	Fettercairn		56°50′49″N 2°35′29″W		9497	Upload another image
Fasque House	Fettercairn		56°52′11″N 2°34′43″W		9503	Upload another image See more images
Fyvie Castle	Fyvie		57°26′36″N 2°23′42″W		9615	Upload another image See more images
St Palladius Episcopal Church	Drumtochty, Auchenblae		56°54′33″N 2°28′55″W		9634	Upload another image See more images
Phesdo House	Fettercairn		56°52′15″N 2°32′00″W		9646	Upload Photo
Drumtochty Castle	Drumtochty, Auchenblae		56°54′39″N 2°29′40″W		9664	Upload another image See more images
Troup Home Farm, Kiln Barn and Cart Shed	Gardenstown		57°40′51″N 2°16′59″W		10585	Upload Photo
Birkenbog House	Fordyce		57°40′25″N 2°46′43″W		10586	Upload another image
Fordyce Castle	Fordyce		57°39′43″N 2°44′46″W		10623	Upload another image See more images
Glassaugh House Dovecot	Fordyce		57°40′15″N 2°44′27″W		10650	Upload Photo
Glassaugh House	Fordyce		57°40′14″N 2°44′32″W		10694	Upload Photo
Forglen House	Turriff		57°33′21″N 2°30′18″W		13603	Upload another image See more images
Bridge of Dye over Water of Dye	South of Strachan		56°57′53″N 2°34′32″W		13878	Upload another image See more images
Terpersie Castle	Alford		57°16′14″N 2°45′13″W		13879	Upload another image See more images
Marykirk Bridge over River North Esk	Marykirk		56°46′32″N 2°30′56″W	(Note: Also in Angus, as it crosses River North Esk, which is the council boundary)	13891	Upload Photo
Upper North Water Bridge over River North Esk	Marykirk		56°47′08″N 2°34′12″W		13892	Upload another image See more images
Mounthooley Dovecot	Mounthooley, Rosehearty	16 April 1971	57°41′00″N 2°07′41″W		15909	Upload another image See more images
Hill Kirk (Pitsligo Parish Church of Scotland)	Peathill, Rosehearty	16 April 1971	57°41′11″N 2°06′42″W		15911	Upload another image See more images
Mains of Pittendrum House	Sandhaven	16 April 1971	57°41′34″N 2°03′41″W		15914	Upload another image
Udny Castle	Pitmedden	16 April 1971	57°19′53″N 2°11′50″W		15922	Upload another image See more images
Pitmedden Great Garden	Pitmedden	16 April 1971	57°20′34″N 2°11′31″W		15925	Upload another image See more images
Glenkindie House	Glenbuchat, Strathdon		57°13′02″N 2°57′27″W		15945	Upload Photo
House of Monymusk	Monymusk		57°13′44″N 2°31′01″W		15967	Upload another image See more images
Tolquhon Castle	Pitmedden	16 April 1971	57°20′53″N 2°12′48″W		15980	Upload another image See more images
Monymusk Parish Church	Monymusk		57°13′37″N 2°31′25″W		15987	Upload another image See more images
Market Cross	Old Rayne		57°20′39″N 2°32′32″W		16019	Upload Photo
Straloch House	Newmachar		57°16′48″N 2°13′58″W		16125	Upload Photo
Harthill Castle	Oyne		57°18′58″N 2°31′19″W		16132	Upload another image See more images
Westhall House	Oyne		57°19′45″N 2°32′38″W		16134	Upload another image
Cairnbulg Castle	Cairnbulg		57°39′56″N 1°58′24″W		16143	Upload another image See more images
House of Memsie	Memsie	16 April 1971	57°38′28″N 2°02′49″W		16146	Upload another image See more images
Skellater House	Strathdon		57°10′57″N 3°08′07″W		16173	Upload Photo
Corgarff Castle	Corgarff		57°09′46″N 3°14′03″W		16178	Upload another image See more images
Montgarrie Meal Mill	Montgarrie, Alford		57°14′54″N 2°42′23″W		16207	Upload Photo
Meldrum House, outer gate and stable and coachhouse block	Oldmeldrum	16 April 1971	57°21′07″N 2°18′50″W		16225	Upload another image See more images
Lickleyhead Castle	Auchleven		57°18′07″N 2°37′13″W		16234	Upload another image See more images
Midmar Castle	Westhill		57°08′14″N 2°29′23″W		16262	Upload another image See more images
Midmar Castle, sundial	Westhill		57°08′14″N 2°29′24″W		16263	Upload Photo
Midmar Castle, walled garden	Westhill		57°08′14″N 2°29′21″W		16264	Upload Photo
Linton House	Sauchen		57°10′48″N 2°29′22″W		16274	Upload Photo
Balmanno House	Marykirk		56°47′21″N 2°30′24″W		16278	Upload Photo
Inglismaldie Castle, Dovecot	Marykirk		56°47′22″N 2°35′14″W		16289	Upload another image
Forebank House	Marykirk		56°46′23″N 2°29′27″W		16328	Upload another image
Lower North Water Bridge over River North Esk	Marykirk		56°45′01″N 2°27′07″W		16330	Upload another image See more images
Buchan Ness Lighthouse	Boddam	16 April 1971	57°28′14″N 1°46′28″W		16367	Upload another image See more images
Towie Barclay Castle	Turriff		57°29′06″N 2°25′41″W		16405	Upload another image See more images
Delgatie Castle	Turriff		57°32′39″N 2°24′43″W		16421	Upload another image See more images
Hatton Castle	Turriff		57°30′44″N 2°24′25″W		16431	Upload another image See more images
Episcopal Church of St. John the Evangelist	New Pitsligo, High Street	16 April 1971	57°35′35″N 2°11′51″W		16440	Upload another image See more images
Haddo House	Tarves		57°24′11″N 2°13′14″W		16470	Upload another image See more images
Tower lodges and gates and Loch of Skene boathouse, Dunecht House	Dunecht		57°09′46″N 2°21′23″W		16505	Upload another image
Garlogie Village Hall, Turbine and Engine House	Garlogie		57°08′23″N 2°21′41″W		16506	Upload another image
Skene House	Skene		57°10′39″N 2°23′08″W		16530	Upload another image See more images
Strichen Town House	Strichen, High Street	16 April 1971	57°35′11″N 2°05′27″W		16551	Upload another image See more images
Blairs College New Chapel	Maryculter		57°05′57″N 2°11′39″W		19227	Upload another image See more images
Castle of Park (Park House)	Cornhill		57°36′09″N 2°41′22″W		19597	Upload another image See more images
Crombie Castle	Marnoch, Aberchirder		57°33′31″N 2°41′07″W		19602	Upload another image See more images
Kinnairdy Castle	Marnoch, Aberchirder		57°32′12″N 2°39′17″W		19606	Upload another image See more images
Marnoch Graveyard	Marnoch, Aberchirder		57°32′16″N 2°40′42″W		19610	Upload another image
Tolquhon Monument, Tarves Churchyard	Tarves	16 April 1971	57°22′15″N 2°13′10″W		19770	Upload another image See more images
Banff Town and Country Club	Banff, Boyndie Street		57°39′54″N 2°31′27″W		21885	Upload Photo
Bridge of Banff over River Deveron	Banff		57°39′46″N 2°30′48″W		21893	Upload another image See more images
Banff Town Hall	Banff, Castle Street		57°40′00″N 2°31′26″W		21941	Upload another image
Banff Castle	Banff, Castle Street		57°40′00″N 2°31′20″W		21957	Upload another image See more images
Duff House	Banff		57°39′31″N 2°31′12″W		21985	Upload another image See more images
Duff House, Mausoleum	Banff		57°39′15″N 2°32′14″W		21988	Upload another image
Old St Mary's Burial Ground	Banff, Church Street		57°39′55″N 2°31′14″W		22003	Upload another image
1 High Shore	Banff		57°39′54″N 2°31′16″W		22004	Upload another image
Banff Primary School (former Banff Academy)	Banff, Institution Terrace		57°39′46″N 2°31′28″W		22035	Upload Photo
8-16 (even nos) Low Street, (former Fife Arms)	Banff		57°39′48″N 2°31′17″W		22056	Upload another image
Tolbooth Steeple	Banff, Low Street		57°39′52″N 2°31′17″W		22062	Upload another image
Town House	Banff, Low Street		57°39′52″N 2°31′17″W		22063	Upload another image See more images
Quayside, Banff Harbour	Banff		57°40′12″N 2°31′24″W		22077	Upload another image
St Catherine's	Banff, St Catherine Street		57°40′04″N 2°31′26″W		22098	Upload Photo
Ingleneuk House	Banff, Water Path		57°39′55″N 2°31′17″W		22111	Upload Photo
Ellon Castle (Old) Sundial at Central Avenue of Garden	Ellon		57°21′59″N 2°04′05″W		31108	Upload another image
Old Bridge of Ellon	Ellon	16 April 1971	57°21′48″N 2°04′23″W		31110	Upload another image See more images
St. Mary on the Rock Episcopal Church	Ellon	16 April 1971	57°21′42″N 2°04′18″W		31111	Upload another image See more images
Market Cross Saltoun Square	Fraserburgh	16 April 1971	57°41′37″N 2°00′19″W		31867	Upload another image See more images
Custom House (formerly occupied by Bank of Scotland)	Fraserburgh, Broad Street	16 April 1971	57°41′32″N 2°00′19″W		31873	Upload another image See more images
Kinnaird's Head Castle Lighthouse	Fraserburgh	16 April 1971	57°41′51″N 2°00′14″W		31888	Upload another image See more images
Wine Tower	Fraserburgh	16 April 1971	57°41′51″N 2°00′10″W		31889	Upload another image See more images
Gordon's Schools (original building only)	Huntly, Castle Road		57°27′02″N 2°47′00″W		34943	Upload another image
St. Margaret's R.C. Church	Huntly, Westpark Street and Chapel Street		57°26′58″N 2°47′15″W		34945	Upload another image See more images
Scott's Hospital	Huntly, Gladstone Road		57°26′42″N 2°46′52″W		34962	Upload another image
Old Bervie Bridge over Bervie Water	Inverbervie		56°50′50″N 2°16′40″W		35070	Upload another image See more images
Kintore Town House	Kintore, The Square		57°14′14″N 2°20′44″W		36312	Upload another image See more images
Old St. Peter's Church	Peterhead, South Road	Delisted	57°30′16″N 1°47′26″W		39668	Upload another image See more images
Peterhead Old Parish Church	Peterhead, Erroll Street	16 April 1971	57°30′18″N 1°46′58″W		39671	Upload another image See more images
23, 25 and 27 North High Street	Portsoy		57°41′02″N 2°41′29″W		40262	Upload another image
16, 18, 20 North High Street 'Old Star Inn'	Portsoy		57°41′02″N 2°41′28″W		40268	Upload another image
10 Shorehead	Portsoy		57°41′05″N 2°41′30″W		40292	Upload another image
Corf Warehouse (Portsoy Marble)	Portsoy, Shorehead		57°41′06″N 2°41′30″W		40293	Upload another image
Old Harbour	Portsoy, Shorehead		57°41′06″N 2°41′28″W		40296	Upload another image
St James the Great Episcopal Church	Stonehaven, Arbuthnott Street		56°57′45″N 2°12′36″W		41552	Upload another image See more images
Rivendell, former textile yard including sea wall	Stonehaven, Keith Place		56°57′40″N 2°12′13″W		41638	Upload Photo
Old Tolbooth of Stonehaven	Stonehaven, Old Pier		56°57′39″N 2°12′08″W		41655	Upload another image See more images
Old Parish Church of St. Congan	Turriff		57°32′16″N 2°27′56″W		42163	Upload another image See more images
St Thomas's Episcopal Church	Aboyne, Ballater Road		57°04′32″N 2°47′35″W		47053	Upload another image See more images
Auchtavan, Cottage	Auchtavan, Royal Deeside		57°02′41″N 3°18′37″W		50074	Upload another image See more images

== See also ==
- Scheduled monuments in Aberdeenshire
