= List of listed buildings in Bourtie =

This is a list of listed buildings in the parish of Bourtie in Aberdeenshire, Scotland.

== List ==
Name	Location	Date Listed	Grid Ref. (Note: Sometimes known as OSGB36, the grid reference (where provided) is based on the British national grid reference system used by the Ordnance Survey. • "Guide to National Grid". Ordnance Survey. • "Get-a-map". Ordnance Survey.)	Geo-coordinates	Notes	LB Number (Note: Historic Environment Scotland assign a unique alphanumeric identifier to each designated site in Scotland, for listed buildings this always begins with "LB", for example "LB12345".)	Image
Bourtie Parish Church				57°18′50″N 2°19′34″W	Category A	2815	Upload another image
Barra Castle, Garden House And Remains Of Garden Wall				57°19′18″N 2°20′52″W	Category B	2824	Upload Photo
Churchyard Of Bourtie				57°18′49″N 2°19′35″W	Category C(S)	2816	Upload Photo
Old Manse Of Bourtie				57°18′54″N 2°19′39″W	Category B	2817	Upload Photo
Bourtie House				57°18′23″N 2°21′28″W	Category A	2819	Upload Photo
Garden Cottage, Bourtie House				57°18′26″N 2°21′28″W	Category B	2820	Upload Photo
Barra Castle, Buildings And Walls Flanking Forecourt, That On The N. Part Of The Castle Farm				57°19′19″N 2°20′45″W	Category B	2822	Upload Photo
Bourtie Churchyard, Sundial				57°18′49″N 2°19′34″W	Category C(S)	32	Upload Photo
Mains Of Thornton				57°18′32″N 2°17′59″W	Category B	2818	Upload Photo
Barra Castle				57°19′19″N 2°20′48″W	Category A	2821	Upload Photo
Barra Castle, Gatepiers To Forecourt				57°19′19″N 2°20′45″W	Category B	2823	Upload Photo

== Key ==
The scheme for classifying buildings in Scotland is:

- Category A: "buildings of national or international importance, either architectural or historic; or fine, little-altered examples of some particular period, style or building type."
- Category B: "buildings of regional or more than local importance; or major examples of some particular period, style or building type, which may have been altered."
- Category C: "buildings of local importance; lesser examples of any period, style, or building type, as originally constructed or moderately altered; and simple traditional buildings which group well with other listed buildings."

In March 2016 there were 47,288 listed buildings in Scotland. Of these, 8% were Category A, and 50% were Category B, with the remaining 42% being Category C.

== See also ==
- List of listed buildings in Aberdeenshire
