= List of listed buildings in Midmar, Aberdeenshire =

This is a list of listed buildings in the parish of Midmar in Aberdeenshire, Scotland.

== List ==
Name	Location	Date Listed	Grid Ref. (Note: Sometimes known as OSGB36, the grid reference (where provided) is based on the British national grid reference system used by the Ordnance Survey. • "Guide to National Grid". Ordnance Survey. • "Get-a-map". Ordnance Survey.)	Geo-coordinates	Notes	LB Number (Note: Historic Environment Scotland assign a unique alphanumeric identifier to each designated site in Scotland, for listed buildings this always begins with "LB", for example "LB12345".)	Image
Mains Of Kebbaty				57°10′08″N 2°32′41″W	Category C(S)	16252	Upload Photo
St. Nidian's Church Midmar				57°08′34″N 2°29′38″W	Category B	16261	Upload Photo
Midmar Castle				57°08′14″N 2°29′23″W	Category A	16262	Upload Photo
Midmar Castle, Walled Garden				57°08′14″N 2°29′21″W	Category A	16264	Upload Photo
West Of Bankhead (Former Free Church)				57°09′33″N 2°33′55″W	Category B	16298	Upload Photo
Old Schoolhouse Corsindae				57°09′34″N 2°30′47″W	Category B	16259	Upload Photo
Barnyards Of Midmar (Now Known As Midmar Castle, Mansion-House Of The Estate)				57°08′20″N 2°29′34″W	Category B	16266	Upload Photo
Sunhoney Farmhouse				57°08′23″N 2°28′06″W	Category C(S)	16269	Upload Photo
Oldtown, Old Kinnernie				57°10′34″N 2°27′26″W	Category B	16273	Upload Photo
St. Nidian's Church Graveyard				57°08′34″N 2°29′38″W	Category B	19792	Upload Photo
Mains Of Linton (Former Home Farm)				57°10′57″N 2°29′25″W	Category B	16248	Upload Photo
Shiels, Farmhouse (Former Small Mansion House) Adjoining Out-Building And Walled Garden				57°10′25″N 2°34′11″W	Category B	16250	Upload Photo
Kebbaty House And Remains Of Walled Garden				57°10′06″N 2°32′41″W	Category B	16251	Upload Photo
Corsindae House				57°10′08″N 2°31′19″W	Category B	16254	Upload Photo
Corsindae House, Doocot				57°10′06″N 2°31′15″W	Category B	16257	Upload Photo
Midmar Castle, Sundial				57°08′14″N 2°29′24″W	Category A	16263	Upload Photo
Mill Of Hole Farmhouse				57°08′20″N 2°28′34″W	Category C(S)	16267	Upload Photo
Linton House				57°10′48″N 2°29′22″W	Category A	16274	Upload Photo
Mains Of Kebbaty, Steading				57°10′08″N 2°32′41″W	Category C(S)	16253	Upload Photo
Corsindae House, Sundial				57°10′09″N 2°31′15″W	Category B	16256	Upload Photo
St Aidan's, Former Manse Of Midmar				57°08′40″N 2°29′58″W	Category B	16297	Upload Photo
Mains Of Linton Doocot And Outhouses				57°10′57″N 2°29′25″W	Category B	16249	Upload Photo
Corsindae House, Walled Garden				57°10′09″N 2°31′15″W	Category C(S)	16255	Upload Photo
Milltown Of Corsindae, Mill				57°10′21″N 2°31′48″W	Category C(S)	16258	Upload Photo
Mill Of Hole Steading				57°08′21″N 2°28′34″W	Category C(S)	16268	Upload Photo
Old Kinnernie, Churchyard				57°10′34″N 2°27′21″W	Category C(S)	16272	Upload Photo
Parish Church				57°08′54″N 2°29′56″W	Category B	16296	Upload another image
Midmar Castle, Outbuilding				57°08′15″N 2°29′25″W	Category B	16265	Upload Photo

== Key ==
The scheme for classifying buildings in Scotland is:

- Category A: "buildings of national or international importance, either architectural or historic; or fine, little-altered examples of some particular period, style or building type."
- Category B: "buildings of regional or more than local importance; or major examples of some particular period, style or building type, which may have been altered."
- Category C: "buildings of local importance; lesser examples of any period, style, or building type, as originally constructed or moderately altered; and simple traditional buildings which group well with other listed buildings."

In March 2016 there were 47,288 listed buildings in Scotland. Of these, 8% were Category A, and 50% were Category B, with the remaining 42% being Category C.

== See also ==
- List of listed buildings in Aberdeenshire
