= List of listed buildings in Oyne, Aberdeenshire =

This is a list of listed buildings in the parish of Oyne in Aberdeenshire, Scotland.

== List ==
| Name | Location | Date listed | Geo-coordinates | Notes | Category | LB number | Image |
|---|---|---|---|---|---|---|---|
| Westhall House | | | 57°19′45″N 2°32′38″W | | A | 16134 | Upload Photo |
| 'Kirklea' (Formerly Free Church Manse) Old Westhall | | | 57°19′17″N 2°32′11″W | | B | 16133 | Upload Photo |
| Pitmachie Farmhouse (Formerly Pitmachie Inn) And Stables | | | 57°20′36″N 2°32′51″W | | B | 16135 | Upload Photo |
| Westhall House, East Lodge, Including Boundary Wall And Gatepiers | | | 57°19′41″N 2°31′11″W | | C(S) | 18983 | Upload Photo |
| Place Of Tilliefour | | | 57°15′53″N 2°33′59″W | | B | 16136 | Upload Photo |
| Place Of Tilliefour Sundial | | | 57°15′52″N 2°33′59″W | | B | 16137 | Upload Photo |
| Harthill Castle | | | 57°18′58″N 2°31′19″W | | A | 16132 | Upload another image See more images |

== Key ==
The scheme for classifying buildings in Scotland is:

- Category A: "buildings of national or international importance, either architectural or historic; or fine, little-altered examples of some particular period, style or building type."
- Category B: "buildings of regional or more than local importance; or major examples of some particular period, style or building type, which may have been altered."
- Category C: "buildings of local importance; lesser examples of any period, style, or building type, as originally constructed or moderately altered; and simple traditional buildings which group well with other listed buildings."

In March 2016 there were 47,288 listed buildings in Scotland. Of these, 8% were Category A, and 50% were Category B, with the remaining 42% being Category C.

== See also ==
- List of listed buildings in Aberdeenshire
