= List of listed buildings in Cluny, Aberdeenshire =

This is a list of listed buildings in the parish of Cluny in Aberdeenshire, Scotland.

== List ==
Name	Location	Date listed	Grid ref. (Note: Sometimes known as OSGB36, the grid reference (where provided) is based on the British national grid reference system used by the Ordnance Survey. • "Guide to National Grid". Ordnance Survey. • "Get-a-map". Ordnance Survey.)	Geo-coordinates	Notes	LB number (Note: Historic Environment Scotland assign a unique alphanumeric identifier to each designated site in Scotland, for listed buildings this always begins with "LB", for example "LB12345".)	Image
Well, Near South Lodge Castle Fraser				57°11′45″N 2°27′14″W	Category B	2931	Upload Photo
Millbank Cottage, Sauchen				57°11′14″N 2°33′47″W	Category C(S)	49295	Upload Photo
Cluny Castle Stableblock				57°12′19″N 2°31′03″W	Category B	2950	Upload Photo
Home Farm, Cluny				57°11′53″N 2°31′21″W	Category B	2955	Upload Photo
Drumnahoy Mill House				57°11′50″N 2°30′07″W	Category B	2956	Upload Photo
Achath, Farmhouse				57°11′19″N 2°26′44″W	Category B	2923	Upload Photo
"John Bell", N.W. Of Castle Fraser				57°12′16″N 2°27′47″W	Category B	2928	Upload Photo
Bristow Cottage				57°11′54″N 2°27′30″W	Category B	2930	Upload Photo
Corrennie, Sauchen				57°11′12″N 2°29′57″W	Category C(S)	2957	Upload Photo
Fraser Mausoleum Old Churchyard Of Cluny				57°12′10″N 2°31′24″W	Category A	2947	Upload Photo
South Lodge, Cluny Castle				57°11′54″N 2°30′18″W	Category B	2954	Upload Photo
Cluny Castle				57°12′16″N 2°30′59″W	Category A	2949	Upload Photo
Gardener's Cottage, Cluny Castle				57°12′15″N 2°30′29″W	Category B	2952	Upload Photo
Castle Fraser				57°12′11″N 2°27′38″W	Category A	2924	Upload Photo
Castle Fraser Walled Garden				57°12′15″N 2°27′34″W	Category B	2926	Upload Photo
Newmill				57°11′09″N 2°33′18″W	Category B	2958	Upload Photo
Leggerdale				57°10′58″N 2°28′22″W	Category B	2933	Upload Photo
Old Churchyard Of Cluny				57°12′10″N 2°31′24″W	Category A	2948	Upload Photo
Manse Of Cluny				57°12′11″N 2°31′32″W	Category C(S)	147	Upload Photo
Cluny Castle Walled Garden				57°12′15″N 2°30′39″W	Category C(S)	2951	Upload Photo
Castle Fraser, Stableblock (Now Present Mansionhouse And Estate Office)				57°12′07″N 2°27′52″W	Category A	2925	Upload Photo
Castle Fraser, West Lodge And Gates				57°12′07″N 2°28′04″W	Category B	2929	Upload Photo
Sylvan Cottage, Cluny Castle				57°12′00″N 2°30′15″W	Category B	2953	Upload Photo
Tillycairn Castle				57°11′33″N 2°33′22″W	Category A	2959	Upload Photo
Woodside, Sauchan				57°12′00″N 2°29′26″W	Category C(S)	2921	Upload Photo
West Mains, Farmhouse				57°11′59″N 2°28′31″W	Category C(S)	2922	Upload Photo
Castle Fraser Sundial				57°12′11″N 2°27′34″W	Category A	2927	Upload Photo
Obelisk, S.S.W. Of Castle Fraser On Courtcairn Farm				57°11′48″N 2°28′09″W	Category C(S)	2932	Upload Photo
Cluny Parish Church (Or North Church Sauchen)				57°12′06″N 2°31′23″W	Category B	2946	Upload Photo

== Key ==
The scheme for classifying buildings in Scotland is:

- Category A: "buildings of national or international importance, either architectural or historic; or fine, little-altered examples of some particular period, style or building type."
- Category B: "buildings of regional or more than local importance; or major examples of some particular period, style or building type, which may have been altered."
- Category C: "buildings of local importance; lesser examples of any period, style, or building type, as originally constructed or moderately altered; and simple traditional buildings which group well with other listed buildings."

In March 2016 there were 47,288 listed buildings in Scotland. Of these, 8% were Category A, and 50% were Category B, with the remaining 42% being Category C.

== See also ==
- List of listed buildings in Aberdeenshire
