= Loch of Skene =

- Loch Skene
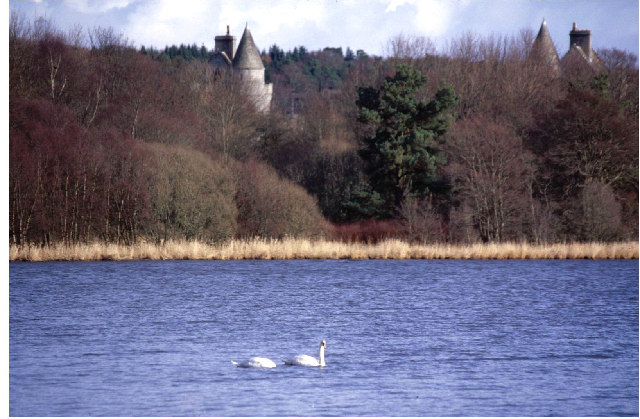
- Loch of Skene in 1999

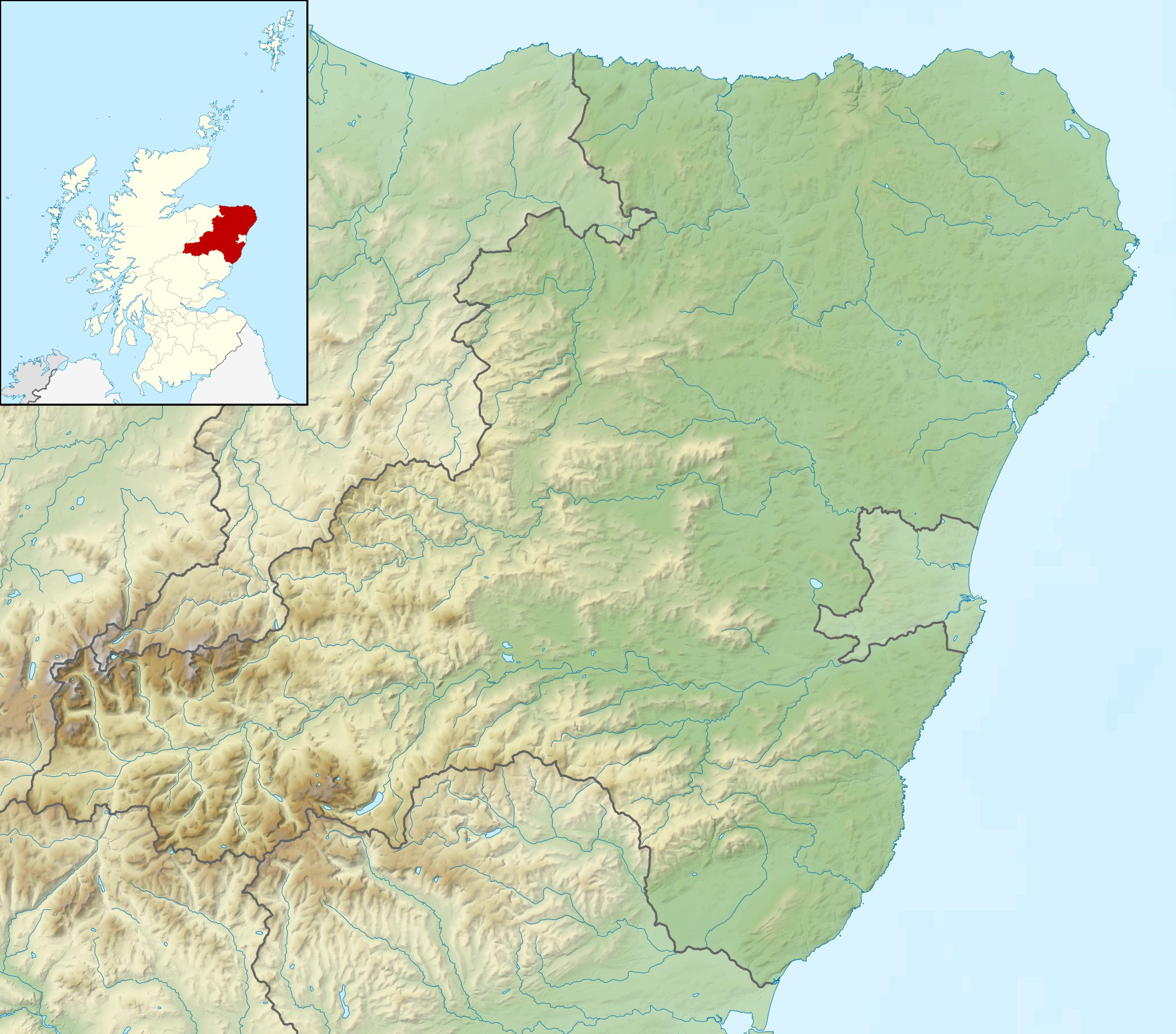
- Location within Aberdeenshire
- Location: Aberdeenshire, Scotland
- Coordinates: 57°9′27″N 2°21′25″W
- Type: freshwater artificial loch
- Primary inflows: Corskie Burn
- Primary outflows: Leuchar Burn
- Basin countries: Scotland
- Max. length: 1 mi (1.6 km)
- Max. width: 0.66 mi (1.06 km)
- Surface area: 144.4 ha (357 acres)
- Average depth: 6 ft (1.8 m)
- Max. depth: 6 ft (1.8 m)
- Water volume: 60,000,000 ft^{3} (1,700,000 m^{3})
- Shore length^{1}: 4.4 km (2.7 mi)
- Surface elevation: 85 m (279 ft)
- Islands: 3

Ramsar Wetland
- Designated: 1 October 1986
- Reference no.: 339
- ^{1} Shore length is not a well-defined measure.

Loch of Skene is a large lowland, freshwater loch in Aberdeenshire, Scotland. It lies approximately 1 mi (1.6 km) to the west of the village of Kirkton of Skene and 9 mi (14 km) west of Aberdeen.

The loch is partially man-made, being dammed at its outflow on the southern shore to form a reservoir. Before 1905, water from the loch was used in the making of tweed and to turn the mill wheel at the Garlogie Mills. The mills closed in 1905. From 1923, the water was used to generate electricity. The loch is about 6 foot deep at its deepest.

== Flora and fauna ==
The loch is designated as a Special Protection Area, a Site of Special Scientific Interest and a Ramsar site for wildlife conservation purposes.

The loch supports concentrations of wildfowl in autumn and winter in particular greylag geese, goldeneye ducks and pink-footed geese. Common gulls are also found on the loch.

Reedbed and a birch and willow carr fringe the loch perimeter.

Pike are found in the loch and a permit is required for fishing.

== Recreation ==
The Aberdeen and Stonehaven Yacht Club is based at the loch.

== Survey ==
The loch was surveyed on 17 July 1905 by T.N. Johnston and L.W. Collett and later charted as part of the Sir John Murray's Bathymetrical Survey of Fresh-Water Lochs of Scotland 1897-1909.
