= Leuchar Burn =

Stream in Aberdeenshire, Scotland

Location
- Country: Scotland

Physical characteristics
- Source
  - location: Loch of Skene
- Mouth: Culter Burn
  - coordinates: 57.10234°N 2.29047°W

Leuchar Burn is a stream that rises in the Loch of Skene, in Aberdeenshire, Scotland. Initially near the headwaters Leuchar Burn flows in a southerly course; as it approaches the Royal Deeside, the watercourse rotates to the southeast, ultimately forming a boundary between Aberdeenshire and Aberdeen City. The stream then veers southerly once again, passing through Leuchar Den, before becoming the Culter Burn, which joins the River Dee at the village of Peterculter.

== See also ==
- Durris Castle
- Garlogie Beam Engine
- Normandykes
