= Garlogie =

Hamlet in Aberdeenshire, Scotland

Coordinates: 57°08′N 2°21′W

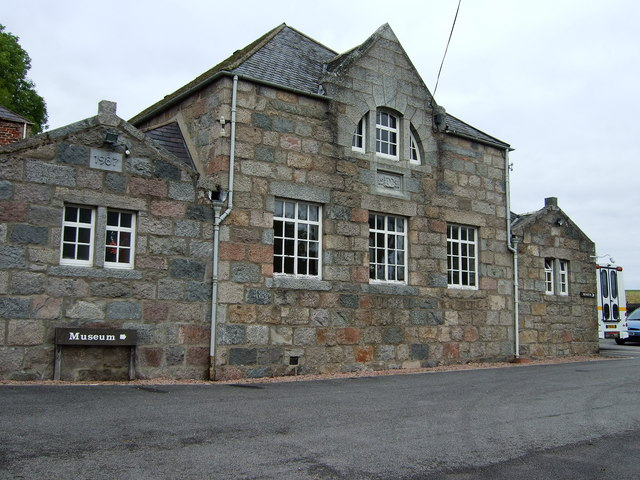
Garlogie Mill Power House, now a museum, has the mill's original beam engine on display

Garlogie (Scottish Gaelic: Geàrr Lagaidh) is a roadside hamlet in Aberdeenshire, Scotland. During the 19th century, it was the site of a textile milling settlement using water from Loch of Skene. The mill houses a beam engine and a 1923 hydropower turbine. Garlogie also has an inn. To the southwest, there is a gas compression and odourisation station which forms part of the National Gas Network.
