= Mounie Castle =

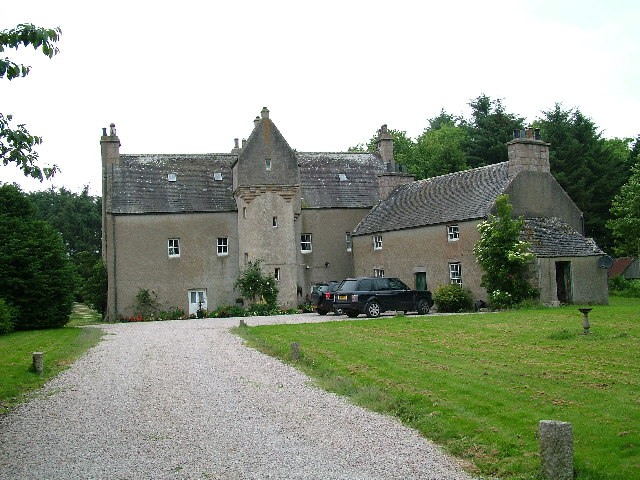
- The castle in 2005

- Location in Aberdeenshire
- 57.347939°N 2.38934°W

History
- Built: 1641 (385 years ago)

Listed Building – Category A
- Designated: 16 April 1971
- Reference no.: LB2793

Mounie Castle stands in its grounds in the village of Daviot, Aberdeenshire, Scotland. A Category A listed building, it was built by Robert Farquhar, lord provost of Aberdeen, between 1641 and 1644.

In 1701 it was owned by Alex Hay of Arnbath. George Seton lived there in 1714. He was a descendant of the Setons of Meldrum, the original owners.

== See also ==
- List of Category A listed buildings in Aberdeenshire
