= Castle Fraser =

Castle in Scotland

Coordinates: 57°12′10.80″N 2°27′38.00″W

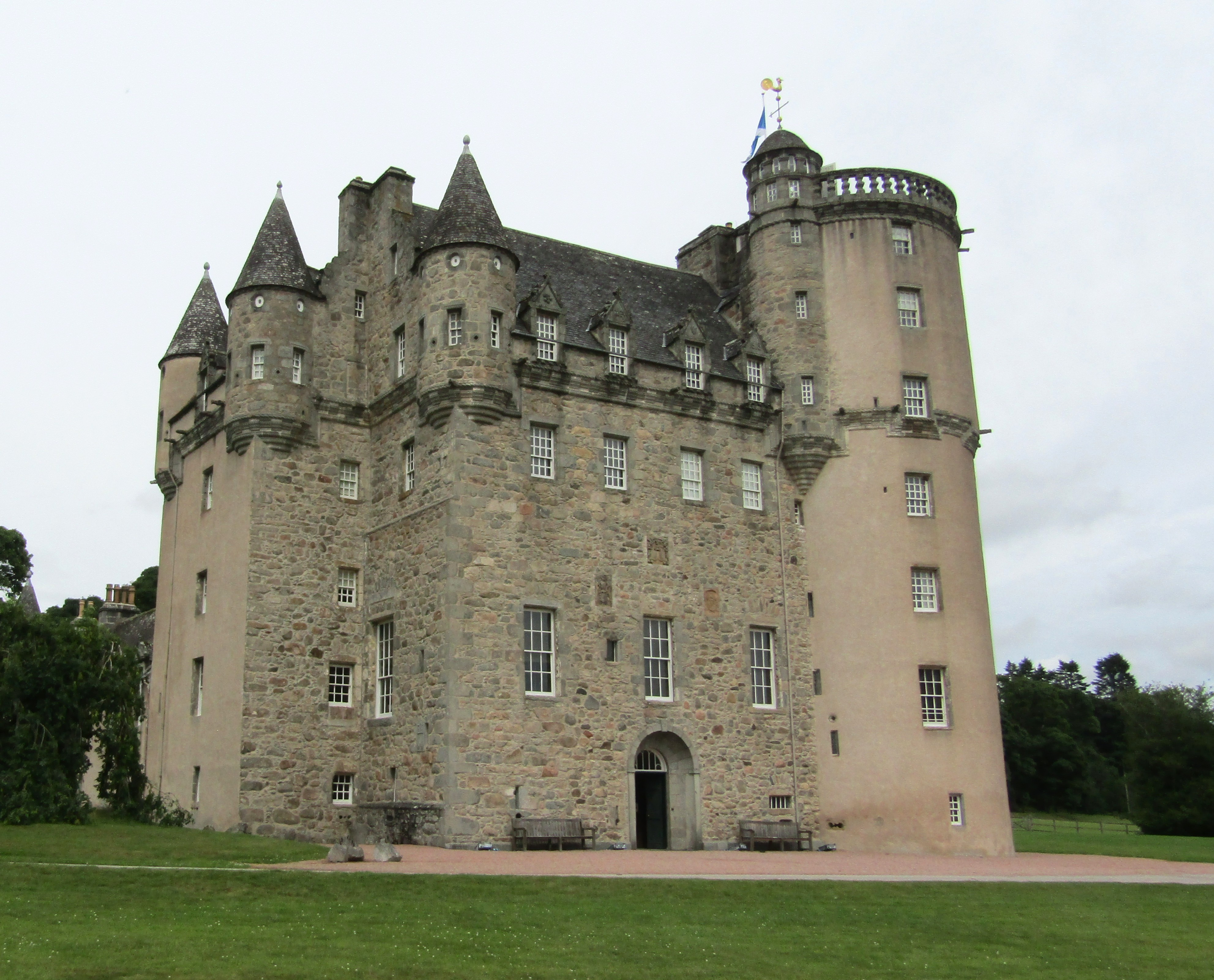
- Castle Fraser in 2025
- Interactive map of Castle Fraser

Site notes
- Owner: National Trust for Scotland

Listed Building – Category A
- Designated: 16 April 1971

Inventory of Gardens and Designed Landscapes in Scotland
- Official name: Castle Fraser
- Designated: 1 July 1987
- Reference no.: GDL00091

Castle Fraser is a large Z-plan castle near Kemnay, Aberdeenshire, Scotland. It is considered one of the most elaborate examples of its type and one of the grandest of the 'Castles of Mar'. The castle stands in over 300 acres (1.2 km^{2}) of landscaped grounds, woodland and farmland, including a 19th-century walled kitchen garden. There is archaeological evidence of an older square tower dating from around 1400 or 1500 within the current construction. The castle is a Category A listed building and the grounds are included in the Inventory of Gardens and Designed Landscapes in Scotland.

== Construction ==
Originally known as Muchall-in-Mar, construction of the elaborate, five-storey Z-plan castle was begun in 1575 by the 6th Laird of Fraser, Michael Fraser, on the basis of an earlier tower, and was completed in 1636. A panel on the northern side of the castle is signed "I Bel", believed to be the mark of the master mason John Bell of Midmar. The castle is a joint creation over several decades with another master mason of this period, Thomas Leiper.

Castle Fraser is contemporary with other nearby castles: Craigievar Castle, Crathes Castle and Midmar Castle which are also believed to have been designed by the Bell family of master masons.

The castle was modernised in a classical style in the late 18th century, with a new entrance inserted in the south side and sash windows throughout. This work was supervised by Elyza Fraser, the lady laird, assisted by Mary Bristow. Elyza was also responsible for the landscaping of the grounds, sweeping away the remains of the original formal gardens and orchards, and for the construction of the impressive octagonal stable block.

The interiors of the building were entirely reconstructed again between 1820 and 1850, by Charles Fraser, using the architects John Smith and William Burn. The Library is a fine example of John Smith's regency style with Tudor detailing. Many of William Burn's more extravagant Gothic designs for the most important rooms were not carried out, although a Gothic-style pipe organ was installed (now removed to St Anne’s Scottish Episcopal Church in Kemnay).

External works during this period included the construction of the twin gatehouses (still extant), and a grand domed stair and access corridors with loggias in the courtyard (removed). The castle was partially restored by the new owners around 1950. The architect and antiquary Dr William Kelly supervised the removal of much 19th-century work to reveal the earlier fabric.

Castle Fraser retains the atmosphere of a family home and still contains the original contents, including Fraser family portraits, furniture and collections. The evocative interiors represent all periods of the castle's history, from the Medieval stone vaulted Great Hall to the Regency Dining Room.

== Ownership ==
Castle Fraser was built as the home of the Frasers of Muchalls, later Frasers of Castle Fraser. The castle was passed down through the Lords Fraser, the Frasers of Inverallochy and then the Mackenzie family who took the name Mackenzie Fraser. In 1897 the last male Fraser of the direct line, Frederick Mackenzie Fraser, died childless. In 1921 his widow, Theodora, sold the castle due to the lack of a suitable heir and mounting financial difficulties. The buyer was Weetman Pearson, 1st Viscount Cowdray, who gave it to his son, Bernard Clive Pearson for restoration. The castle then passed onto Lavinia Pearson and her husband Major Charles Michael Smiley. The Pearson family then gave the castle to the National Trust for Scotland in 1976. The Trust now opens the castle to visitors all year round along with the grounds and walled garden. During 2019, the site received 56,822 visitors.

== In film ==
Some scenes in the 2006 film The Queen, starring Dame Helen Mirren, featured Castle Fraser as a backdrop.

== Gallery ==
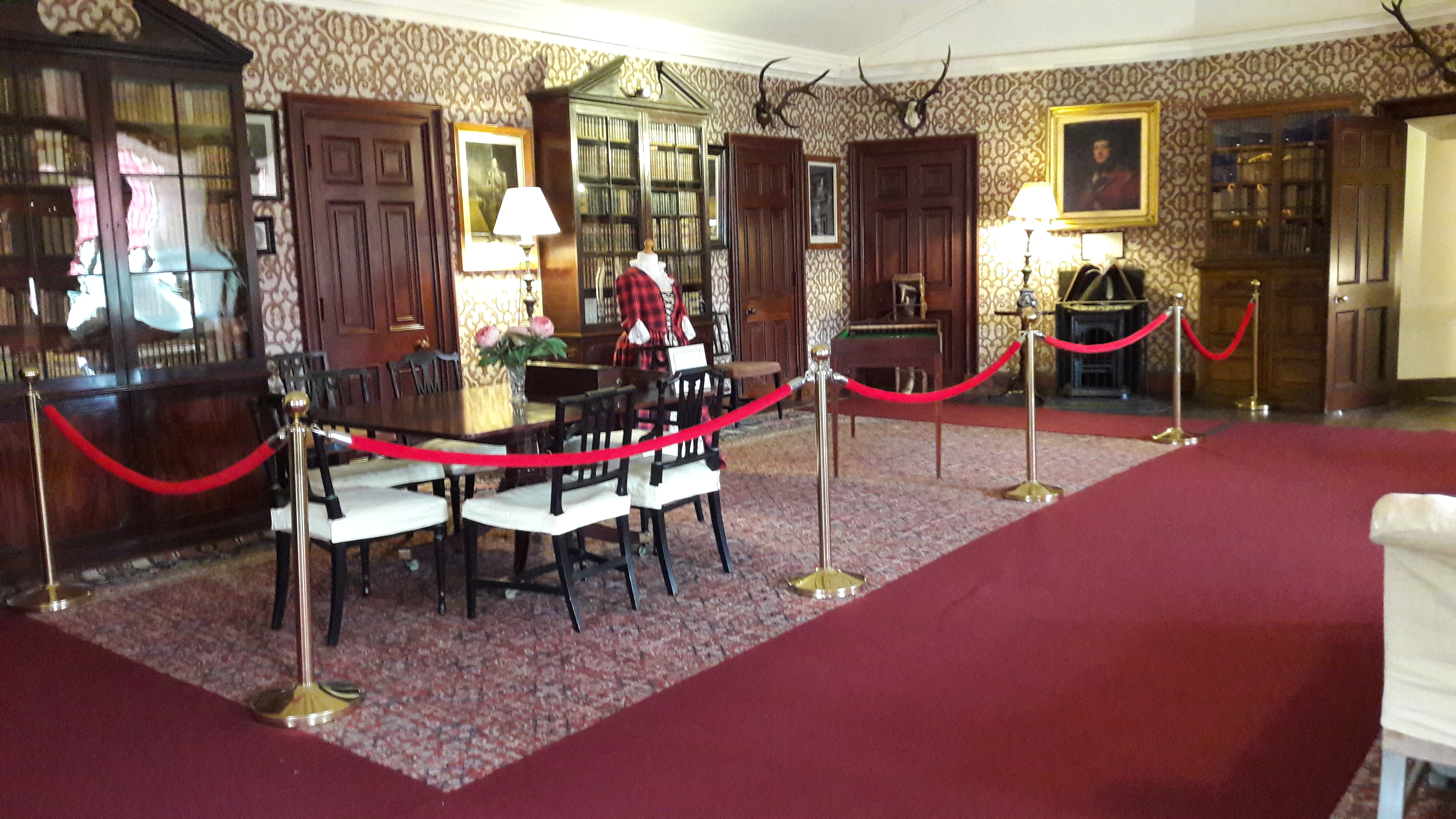
The castle's library (2018)

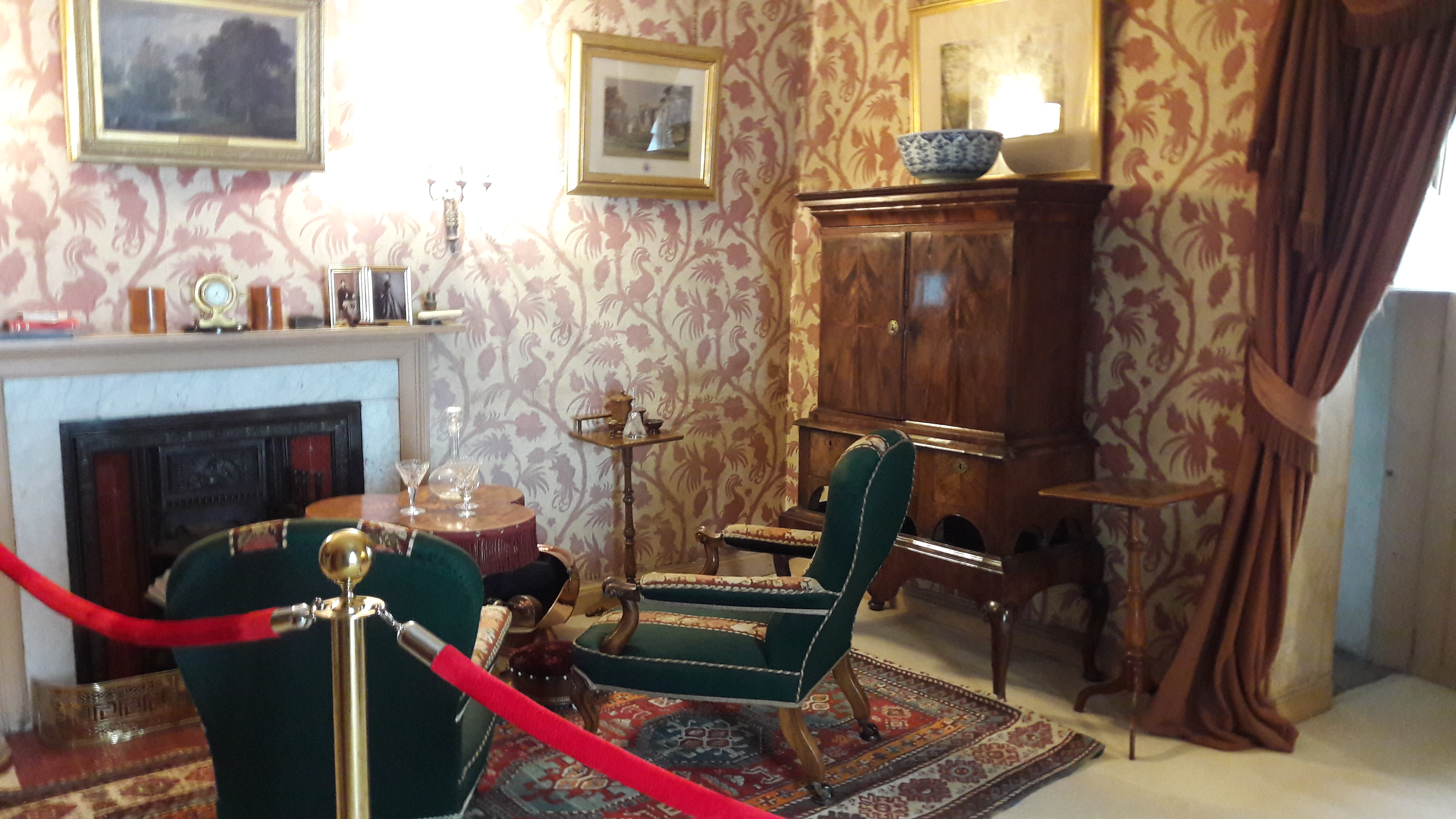
The parlour (2018)

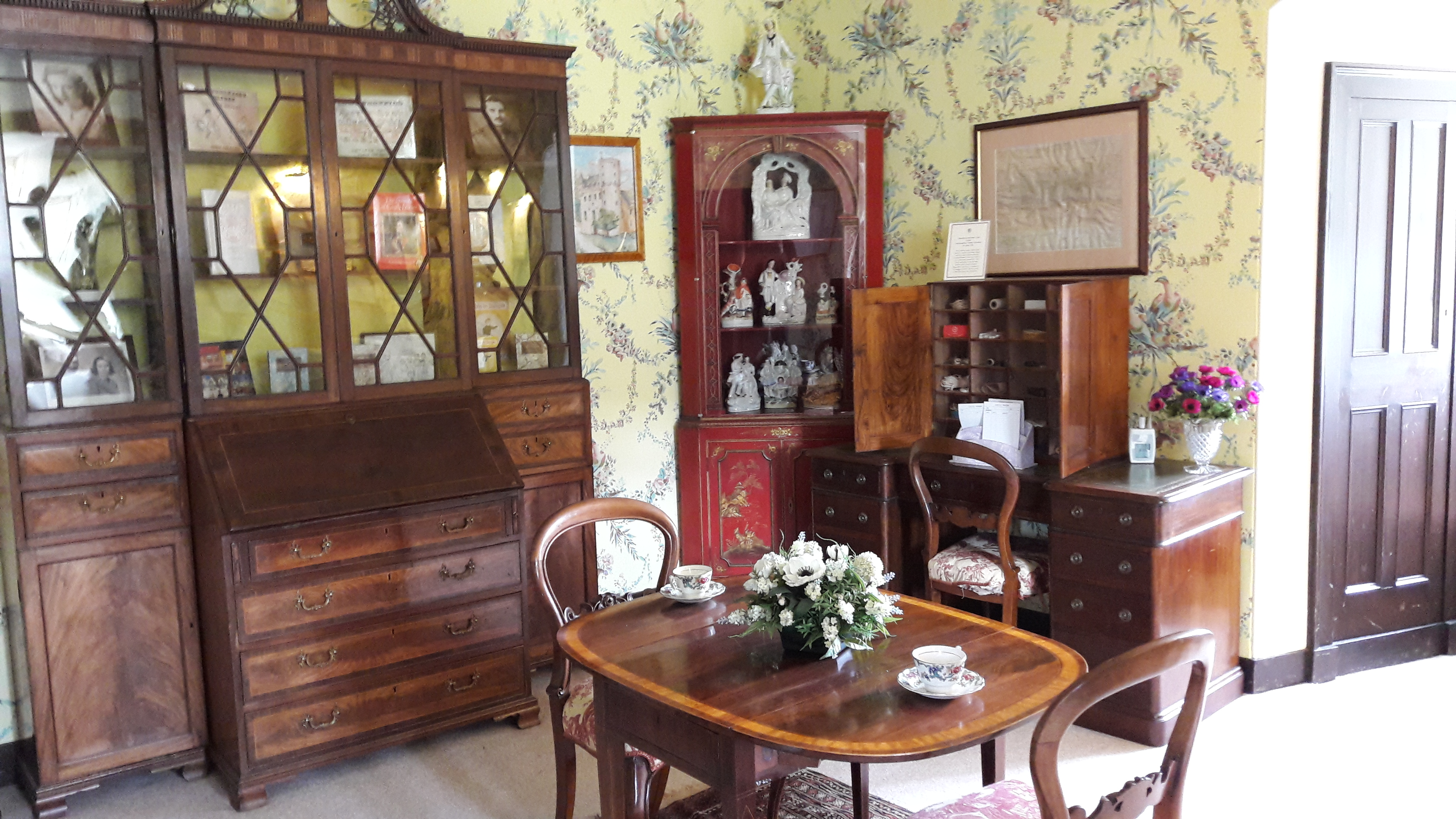
Writing room (2018)

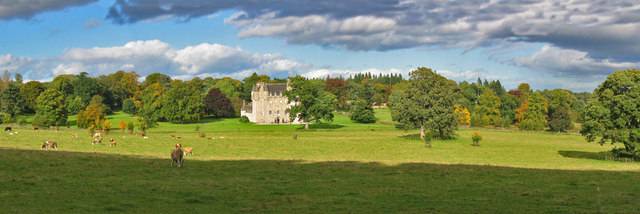
The castle in 2008

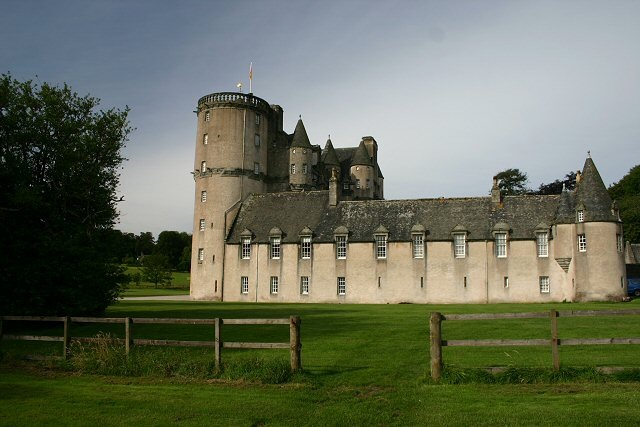
Side view (2007)

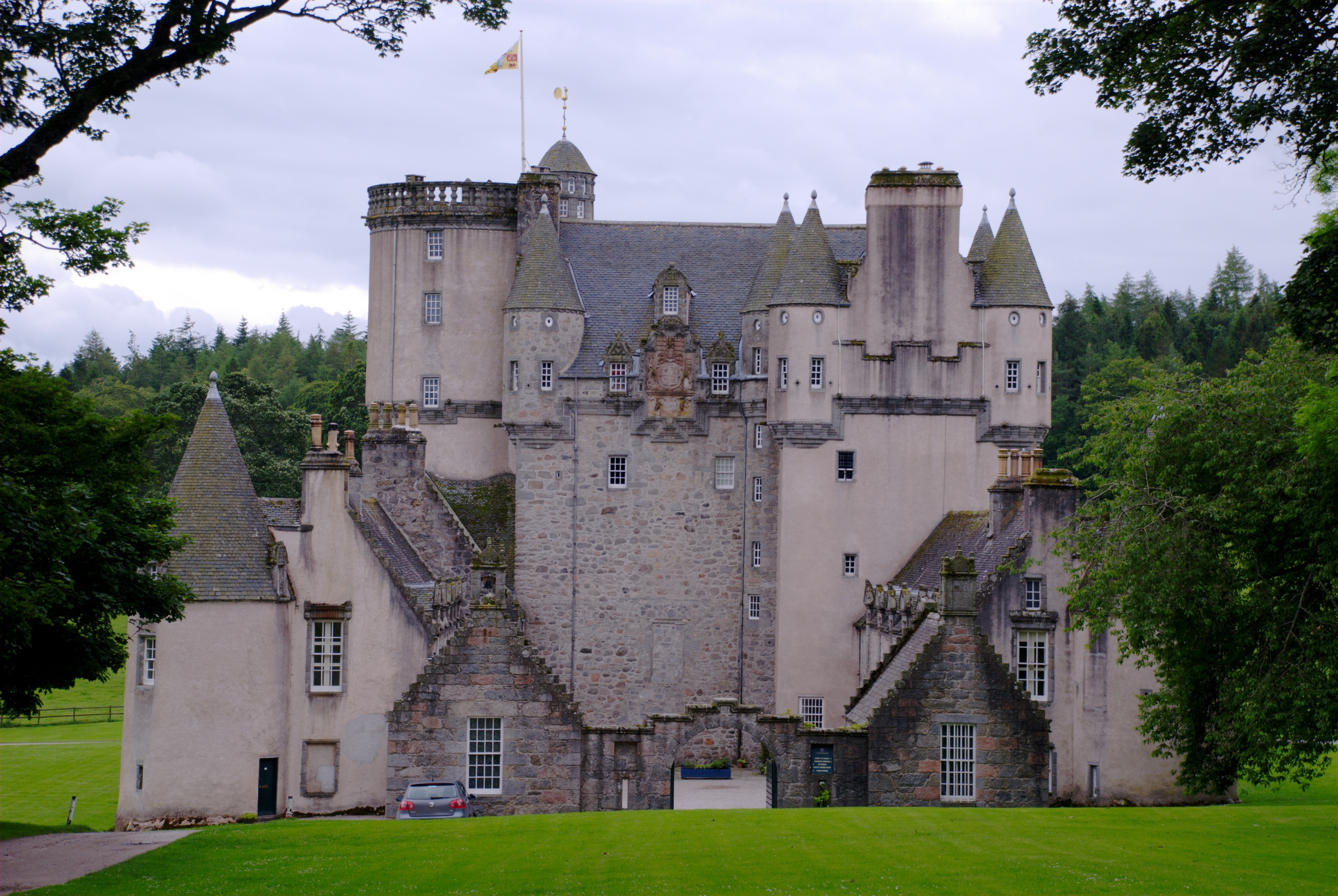
Back view of the castle (2007)

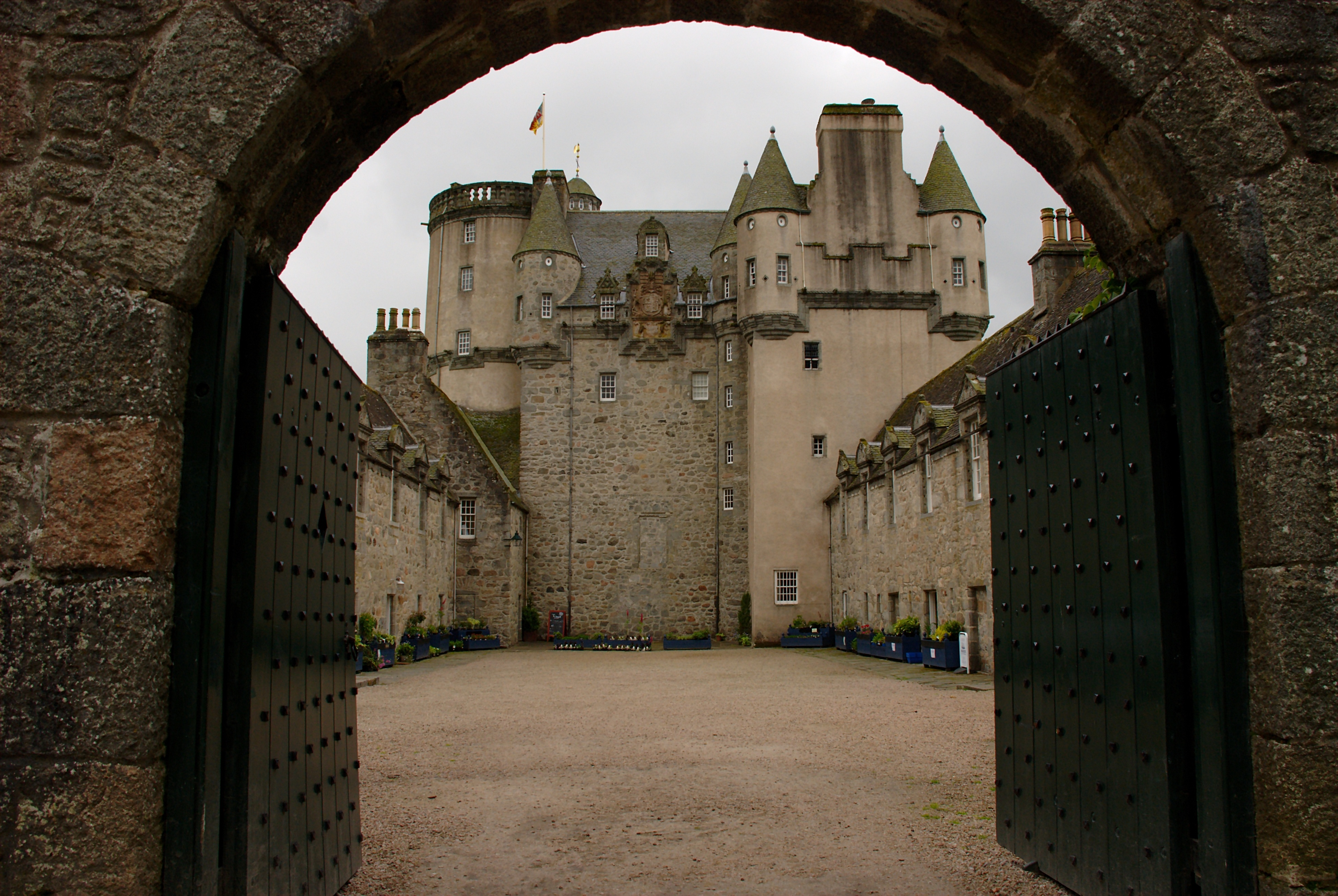
Rear courtyard (2007)

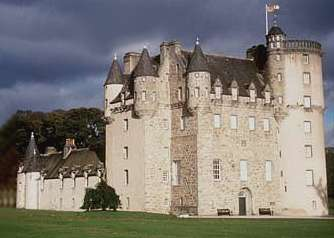
The castle in 2004

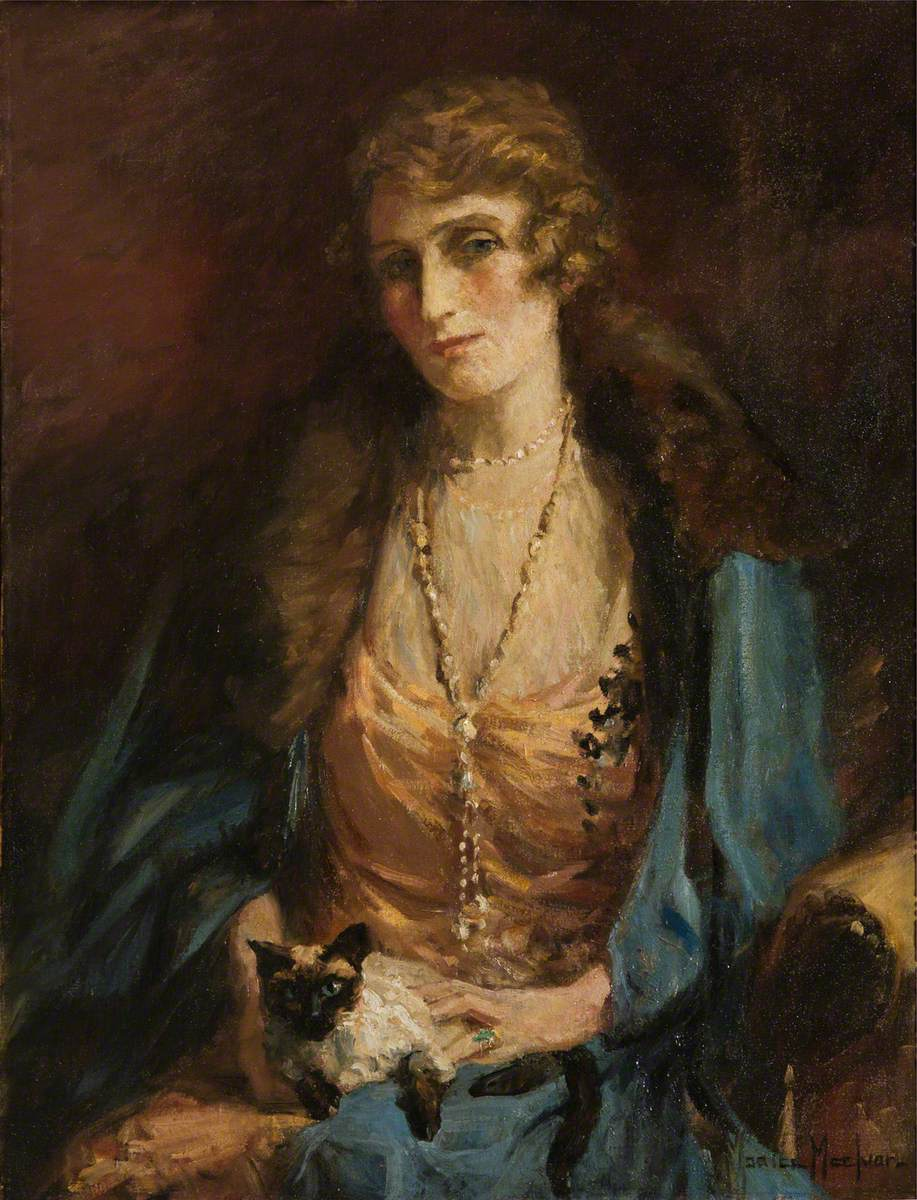
Theodora Mackenzie Fraser portrait

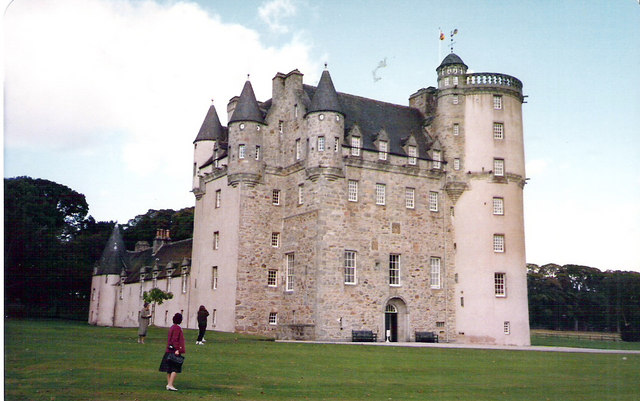
The castle in 1987

== See also ==
- Miranda, Countess of Iveagh
