= Strichen Town House =

Municipal building in Strichen, Scotland

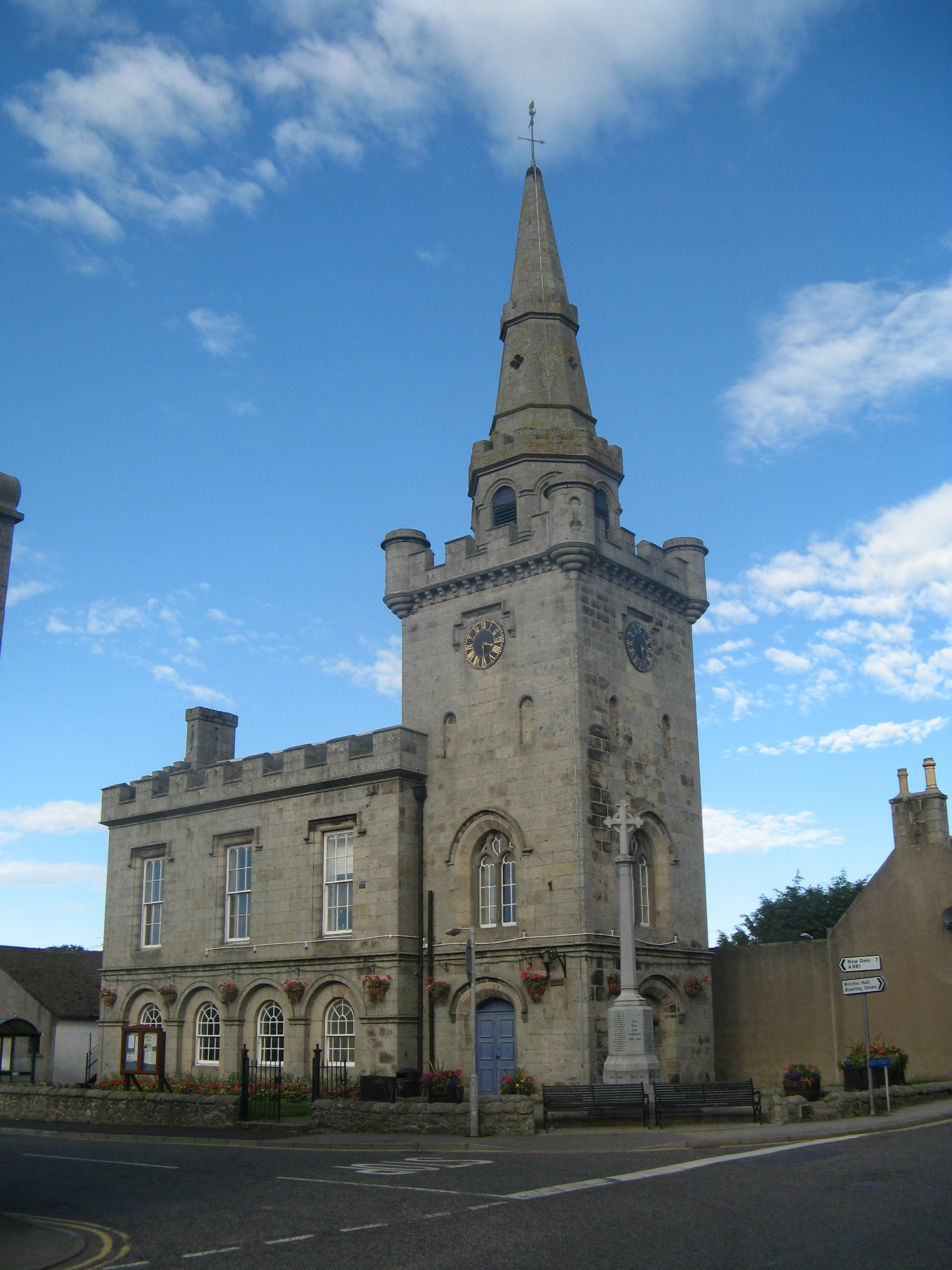
- Strichen Town House, 2013

- Shown in Aberdeenshire
- 57.5864°N 2.0908°W
- Location: High Street, Strichen

History
- Built: 1816

Site notes
- Architect: John Smith
- Architectural styles: Tudor and neoclassical style mix

Listed Building – Category A
- Official name: Town House High Street and Bridge Street
- Designated: 16 April 1971
- Reference no.: LB16551

Strichen Town House is a municipal structure in High Street, Strichen, Aberdeenshire, Scotland. The building, which was the meeting place of Strichen Parish Council, is a Category A listed building.

== History ==
The town house was commissioned in the early 19th century by Thomas Fraser, 12th Lord Lovat, who was chief of the Fraser clan at the time. The building was designed by John Smith in a mix of Tudor and neoclassical styles, built in ashlar stone at a cost of £2,000 and was completed in 1816.

The design involved an asymmetrical main frontage with a hall block of four bays and a tower facing onto Bridge Street; on the ground floor of the hall block there was a row of four round-headed openings forming an arcade, which was originally open and provided a covered market, in a similar style to John Baxter's Peterhead Town House. There were three sash windows on the first floor of the hall block and a crenellated parapet at roof level. To the right of the hall block, there was a three-stage tower with a round-headed doorway on the ground floor, a mullioned window with tracery in the second stage and a clock in the third stage. Above the tower there was a parapet with corbelled corner turrets and a spire on an octagonal base. Its design was similar to that of William Robertson's tolbooth in Forres, and its tower and spire were inspired by 16th-century Scots tollbooths. A belfry with a bell, which had been cast by Thomas Mears at the Whitechapel Bell Foundry, was added in 1818.

The arcading on the ground floor was infilled when the floor was converted for use as a school for girls in 1875. A war memorial, in the form of a six-sided granite column surmounted by a cross and which was intended to commemorate the lives of local service personnel who had died in the First World War, was unveiled outside the town house by Captain Robert Charles Penny Philp MC on 25 August 1920.

The parish council ceased to be responsible for administration of the village when Banff and Buchan District Council was established in 1975. The unitary authority for the area, Aberdeenshire Council, held a review of conservation area issues in the village during 2009; it reported back on the issues found, which included a proposal to convert the town house into a community hub, at a meeting in the building on 20 January 2010. Local people indicated support for an aspiration that the building be restored and retained for community use, and a charity, the Strichen Town House Trust, was subsequently formed to restore, enhance and further develop the town house.

== See also ==
- List of Category A listed buildings in Aberdeenshire
- List of listed buildings in Strichen, Aberdeenshire
