= Mary Bristow =

Landscape architect

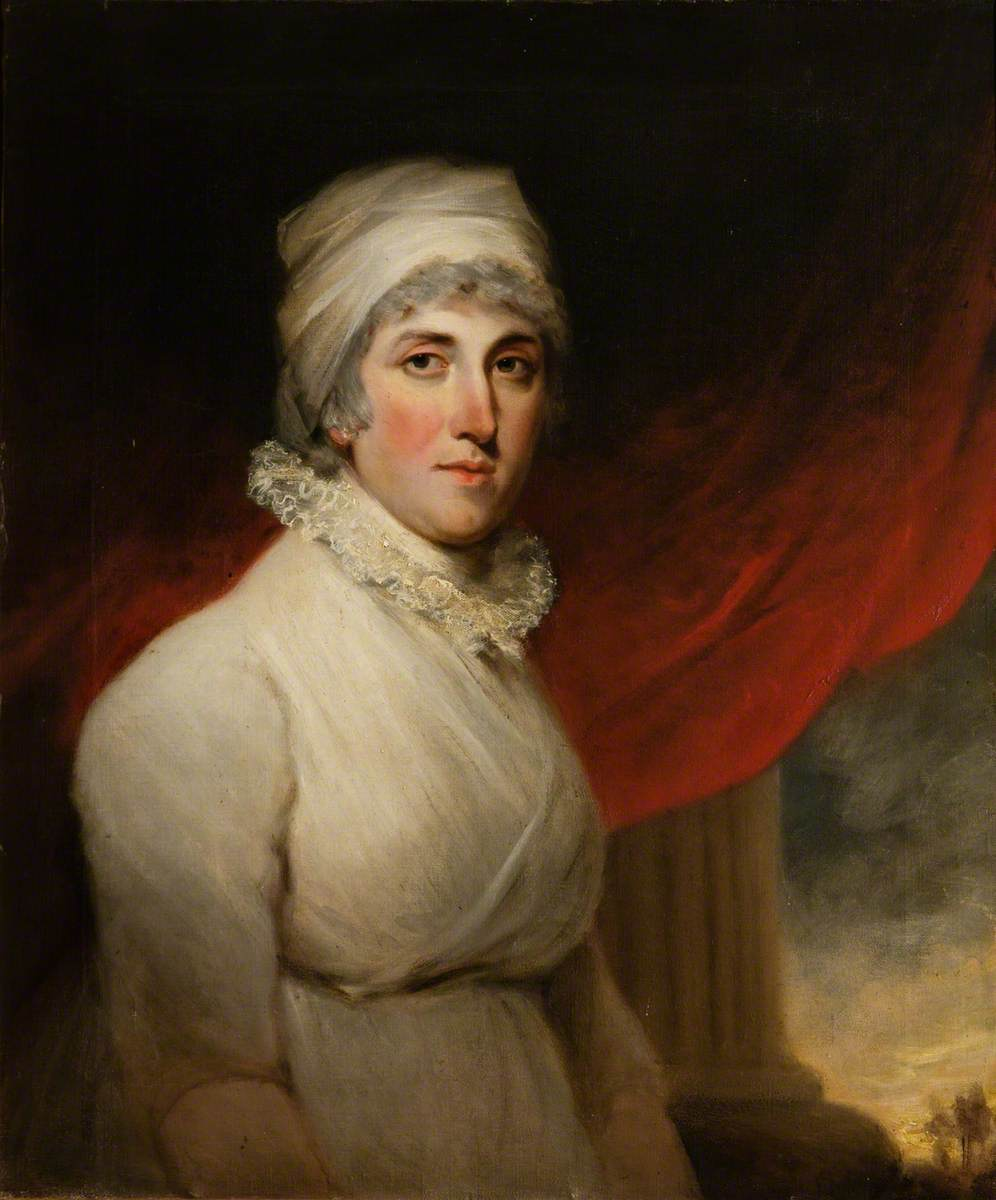
Portrait of Mary Bristow by George Chinnery.

Mary Bristow of Quidenham Hall, Norfolk (??? - 1805) was best known for developing and designing the woodland, known as Miss Bristow’s Wood, from the agricultural land surrounding Castle Fraser she was also known as the close friend of Elyza Fraser (the lady laird of Castle Fraser 1734-1814). Together they spent more than £9,600 (over £500,000 today) between 1797 and 1800, following the fashion set by Elyza’s neighbour, Sir Archibald Grant of Monymusk.

Bristow spent many years as the companion of Elyza Fraser at Castle Fraser. She first met Fraser in Bristol on 18 June 1781 and the two women travelled extensively through Europe, both separately and together. This may have been due in part to Mary's ill health. Both women had an interest in gardening and kept a notebook of visits to great gardens. She also played the keyboard, and dueted with Fraser, who played the violin.

Highly cultured ladies, they travelled through Europe together. Their portraits hang in the castle. Bristow acquired several books on landscape design, which remain in the castle library along with examples of her embroidery in the Castle's Worked Room.

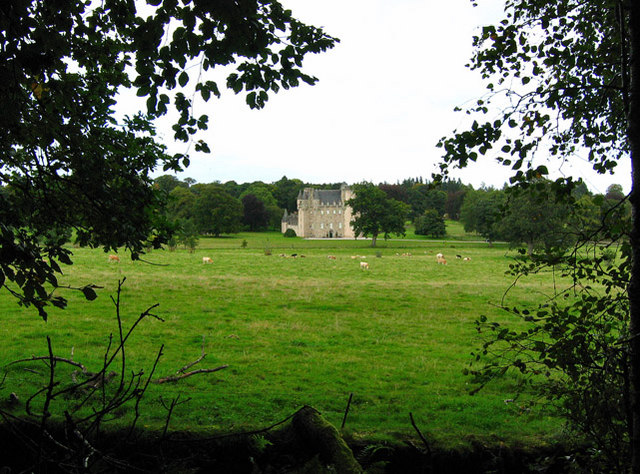
View of Castle Fraser from Miss Bristow's Wood

Following Bristow's death in 1805, Elyza Fraser erected a granite monument which stands in the grounds of Castle Fraser, bearing the inscription: Sacred to the memory of a friendship which subsisted over 40 years, Elyza Fraser erects this monument in the groves planted by her lamented friend.
