= List of listed buildings in Strichen, Aberdeenshire =

This is a list of listed buildings in the parish of Strichen in Aberdeenshire, Scotland.

== List ==
| Name | Location | Date Listed | Grid Ref. (Note: Sometimes known as OSGB36, the grid reference (where provided) is based on the British national grid reference system used by the Ordnance Survey. • "Guide to National Grid". Ordnance Survey. • "Get-a-map". Ordnance Survey.) | Geo-coordinates | Notes | LB Number (Note: Historic Environment Scotland assign a unique alphanumeric identifier to each designated site in Scotland, for listed buildings this always begins with "LB", for example "LB12345".) | Image |
|---|---|---|---|---|---|---|---|
| Bogensourie Cottage | | | | 57°36′09″N 2°05′46″W | Category B | 16539 | Upload Photo |
| 23, 25 Water Street | | | | 57°35′13″N 2°05′36″W | Category C(S) | 16556 | Upload Photo |
| All Saints' Episcopal Church, Hall And Schoolhouse, North Street | | | | 57°35′19″N 2°05′31″W | Category C(S) | 16562 | Upload Photo |
| 2 North Street | | | | 57°35′10″N 2°05′17″W | Category C(S) | 16564 | Upload Photo |
| Northcote, North Street | | | | 57°35′09″N 2°05′25″W | Category B | 16565 | Upload Photo |
| Original Parish Church Of Strichen, South Aisle | | | | 57°34′58″N 2°05′24″W | Category B | 16569 | Upload Photo |
| Hunter's Lodge, Mormond Hill | | | | 57°36′05″N 2°03′42″W | Category C(S) | 16541 | Upload Photo |
| 75, 77 High Street Strichen | | | | 57°35′15″N 2°05′31″W | Category C(S) | 16552 | Upload Photo |
| Anderson And Woodman Institute, Water Street | | | | 57°35′18″N 2°05′41″W | Category B | 16558 | Upload Photo |
| Former Parish Church Of Strichen | | | | 57°34′57″N 2°05′25″W | Category C(S) | 16570 | Upload Photo |
| Old Bridge Over Ugie Water At Mill Of Strichen | | | | 57°35′19″N 2°05′46″W | Category B | 16568 | Upload Photo |
| Old Parish Church Graveyard | | | | 57°34′57″N 2°05′24″W | Category C(S) | 16571 | Upload Photo |
| Techmuiry House And Offices | | | | 57°37′51″N 2°04′20″W | Category B | 16540 | Upload Photo |
| Howford, Old Farmhouse | | | | 57°35′00″N 2°04′45″W | Category C(S) | 16543 | Upload Photo |
| Strichen House, Doocot | | | | 57°34′48″N 2°06′25″W | Category B | 16548 | Upload Photo |
| Mormond Hotel, Water Street At W. Corner With Bridge Street | | | | 57°35′09″N 2°05′33″W | Category C(S) | 16559 | Upload Photo |
| Adziel House | | | | 57°34′08″N 2°05′25″W | Category C(S) | 16545 | Upload Photo |
| New Leeds Church And Manse (Now Mrs. Smith) | | | | 57°34′48″N 2°00′32″W | Category B | 16546 | Upload Photo |
| Strichen House, Kennels Cottage | | | | 57°34′42″N 2°06′55″W | Category B | 16549 | Upload Photo |
| Bridge Over North Ugie Water On B 9093 | | | | 57°35′21″N 2°05′46″W | Category C(S) | 16567 | Upload Photo |
| Mill Of Strichen | | | | 57°35′19″N 2°05′46″W | Category B | 16538 | Upload Photo |
| Burnshangie Farmhouse And Walled Garden | | | | 57°35′20″N 2°05′02″W | Category B | 16542 | Upload Photo |
| Strichen House, Stableblock, (Barnyards Of Strichen) Strichen Mains | | | | 57°34′34″N 2°06′25″W | Category B | 16547 | Upload Photo |
| Town House High Street And Bridge Street | | | | 57°35′11″N 2°05′27″W | Category A | 16551 | Upload another image |
| 40, 42 North Street | | | | 57°35′16″N 2°05′26″W | Category C(S) | 16563 | Upload Photo |
| Manse Of Strichen | | | | 57°34′38″N 2°05′27″W | Category C(S) | 16572 | Upload Photo |
| Dairy (Gordon) High Street | | | | 57°35′16″N 2°05′37″W | Category C(S) | 16555 | Upload Photo |
| 25 Bridge Street And S. Gibson's Shop | | | | 57°35′10″N 2°05′28″W | Category C(S) | 16560 | Upload Photo |
| All Saint's Episcopal Church, West Street | | | | 57°35′19″N 2°05′32″W | Category C(S) | 16561 | Upload Photo |
| Bridge Over North Ugie Water (A 981) At S.W. End Of Bridge Street | | | | 57°35′07″N 2°05′33″W | Category C(S) | 16566 | Upload Photo |
| "Roman" Bridge, Howford, Over North Ugie Water | | | | 57°34′54″N 2°04′47″W | Category C(S) | 16544 | Upload Photo |
| Mart House Market Street | | | | 57°35′09″N 2°05′25″W | Category B | 16550 | Upload Photo |
| Holmwood, High Street | | | | 57°35′20″N 2°05′39″W | Category B | 16554 | Upload Photo |
| Library House, Water Street | | | | 57°35′17″N 2°05′40″W | Category B | 16557 | Upload Photo |

== Key ==
The scheme for classifying buildings in Scotland is:

- Category A: "buildings of national or international importance, either architectural or historic; or fine, little-altered examples of some particular period, style or building type."
- Category B: "buildings of regional or more than local importance; or major examples of some particular period, style or building type, which may have been altered."
- Category C: "buildings of local importance; lesser examples of any period, style, or building type, as originally constructed or moderately altered; and simple traditional buildings which group well with other listed buildings."

In March 2016 there were 47,288 listed buildings in Scotland. Of these, 8% were Category A, and 50% were Category B, with the remaining 42% being Category C.

== See also ==
- List of listed buildings in Aberdeenshire
