= Tillycairn Castle =

Castle in Aberdeenshire, Scotland

Coordinates: 57.1924°N 2.5562°W

Tillycairn Castle is a 16th-century L-plan castle standing on high ground around 2.0 miles (3.2 km) south-east of Cluny in Aberdeenshire, Scotland. It is a Category A listed building, designated on 16 April 1971.

== History ==
The castle was probably strengthened by Matthew Lumsden in 1542 following the depredations of Clan Strachan of Lynturk in the course of the quarrel between Clan Gordon and Clan Forbes. In 1672, when the last of the Lumsden line died, the castle went to Thomas Burnett of Sauchen. Thereafter it had Forbes connections until it passed to the Gordons in the early 18th century. The castle became ruinous by 1722, but has been restored for David Lumsden, who acquired it from the Cluny estate in 1973, by the architect Ian Begg in 1980-84.

== Structure ==
The four-storey castle is small, with thick walls which are constructed in the lower courses of large boulders. It has rounded corners, and all save one of the gables have angle turrets. There is a semicircular stair tower in the re-entrant angle, with an ashlar cap house. The main entrance is beside the stair tower. There was once a parapet on the west side of the wing. There is corbelling at the top. The wing is five storeys high.

Internally, the basement has three vaulted rooms, including the kitchen, which has a wide arched fireplace. The hall takes up the whole of the first floor. This has a fine fireplace, and a store sink and drain. Above the fireplace is a so-called “Laird's Lug”, a secret listening chamber allowing the Laird to overhear conversations in the Great Hall. The bedrooms were on the higher floors.
