= Sauchen =

Coordinates: 57.1873°N 2.4992°W

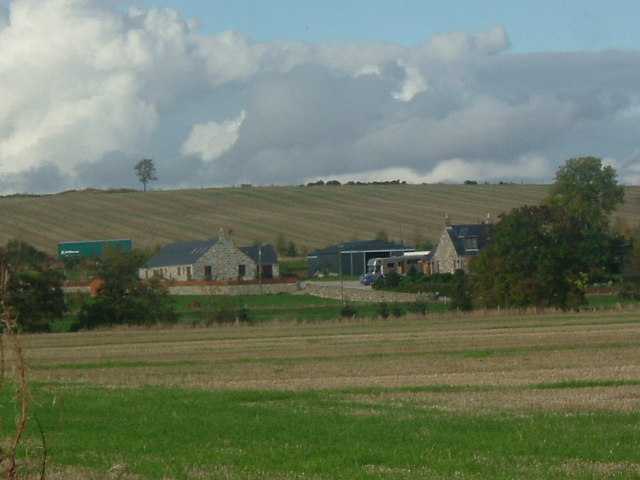
- Farm at Dockenwell, west of Sauchen

- Location within Aberdeenshire
- OS grid reference: NJ698111
- Council area: Aberdeenshire
- Lieutenancy area: Aberdeenshire
- Country: Scotland
- Sovereign state: United Kingdom
- Post town: INVERURIE
- Postcode district: AB51
- Police: Scotland
- Fire: Scottish
- Ambulance: Scottish
- UK Parliament: West Aberdeenshire and Kincardine
- Scottish Parliament: Aberdeenshire West

Sauchen is a village in Aberdeenshire, Scotland that lies 3 miles (5 km) west of Dunecht and 10 miles (16 km) west of Aberdeen.

The village has around 200 houses, and is serviced by Cluny Primary School which is located around 1 mile (1.6 km) north of the centre. Near the centre of the village lies Sauchen Play Park for children. There are no amenities like shops, cafes, restaurants, bars, or hotels in the village.

Nearby is Shiels, an eighteenth century mansion with gathering hall. It was built in 1742 for West India trader, Charles MacKay of Shiels.

== Sources ==
- Sauchen in the Gazetteer for Scotland.
