= Dunecht =

Coordinates: 57.17117°N 2.41010°W

Dunecht: Scottish Gaelic: Dùn Eicht
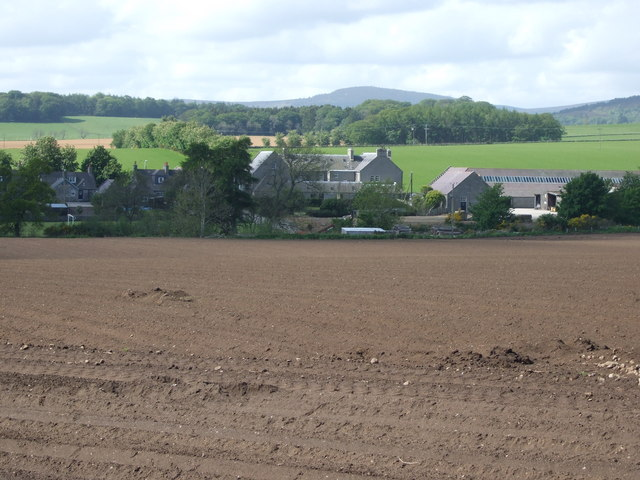
- Dunecht viewed from the north

- Location within Aberdeenshire
- OS grid reference: NJ753090
- Council area: Aberdeenshire
- Lieutenancy area: Aberdeenshire
- Country: Scotland
- Sovereign state: United Kingdom
- Post town: WESTHILL
- Postcode district: AB32
- Police: Scotland
- Fire: Scottish
- Ambulance: Scottish
- UK Parliament: West Aberdeenshire and Kincardine
- Scottish Parliament: Aberdeenshire West

Dunecht (Scottish Gaelic: Dùn Eicht) is a slightly linear village on the A944 road in north-east Aberdeenshire in Scotland. It is not to be confused with Echt.

Dunecht is located 12 miles (19.5 km) west of the city of Aberdeen and is situated by the confluence of the Kinnernie and Bervie burns.

Formerly known as Waterton, it was renamed to Dunecht in the 1820s when the Crawford family built Dunecht House. The estate achieved a certain measure of notoriety in 1881 due to theft of the remains of the Alexander Lindsay, 25th Earl of Crawford.

Dunecht House, once owned by Viscount Cowdray is now privately owned. Dunecht House is to the south of the village and was once famed for its observatory, ballroom and library, as well as gardens which were opened once a year to the public. The estate is also home to the Dunecht Cricket Club, founded as an estate cricket club in 1925 and still actively playing in the Aberdeenshire Grades cricket league.

Corsindae House is 5 miles (8 km) west of here, and is in the Scottish baronial style; built between the 1450s and 1600s (decade).

Amenities in the village include a school, a pub (Jaffs), and a garage-come-shop.
