= Balfluig Castle =

Tower house in Aberdeenshire, Scotland

Coordinates: 57.2243°N 2.6866°W

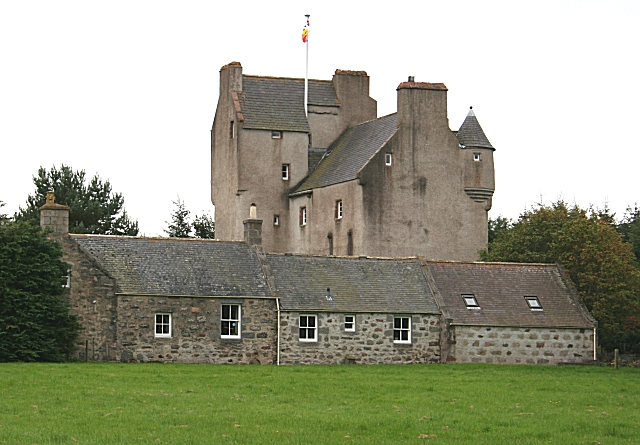
Balfuig Castle, shown in 2007

Balfluig Castle is an L-plan tower house, dating from the mid-16th century, a mile south of Alford, in the Howe of Alford, Aberdeenshire, Scotland. The tower is conspicuous throughout the Howe. It may be viewed by appointment.

== History ==
The first owners of Balfluig were a branch of Clan Forbes. The voussoirs on the doorway show the date 1556. The castle was burned during the battle of Alford in 1645. It was purchased by the Farquharson of Haughton in 1753. In due course it was used as a farmhouse. It was derelict by the 1960s, but a new owner, Mark Tennant, restored it, as one of the earliest fortalices saved through the help of the Historic Buildings Council for Scotland, particularly through the advocacy of W. Douglas Simpson.

The date of building is significant as it is in a period where there was little private building in Scotland.

== Structure ==
The plan of the castle is highly unusual. The main block of the castle has three storeys and a garret. The wing, one storey higher and topped by a watchtower, projects eastward from the main block in a way that creates two re-entrant angles. A semicircular stair tower rises in the south-west angle.

The outer angles are corbelled square beneath roof level, being rounded lower. The walls have many gun loops. On the south gable is a massive chimney stack.

A courtyard leads to the entrance, an arched doorway protected by gun loops, which is in the main re-entrant angle.

The basement of the main block contains two vaulted chambers, the kitchen and the wine cellar. There is a private stair to the hall above, which has a vaulted withdrawing room attached.

In the basement of the wing is a vaulted guardroom, which has a small prison beneath the turnpike stair.

The tower is roughly built of pinned boulder rubble; the dressings are part sandstone and part granite.

The open timbered roof probably dates from the restoration of the castle after the battle of Alford.

It is a category A listed building.

== Tradition ==
Tradition asserts that there was another fortalice nearby. The rival lairds would shoot at each other from their watch rooms. After one finally killed the other, the surviving laird was filled with remorse.
