= Gairnshiel Bridge =

18th century bridge in Aberdeenshire, Scotland

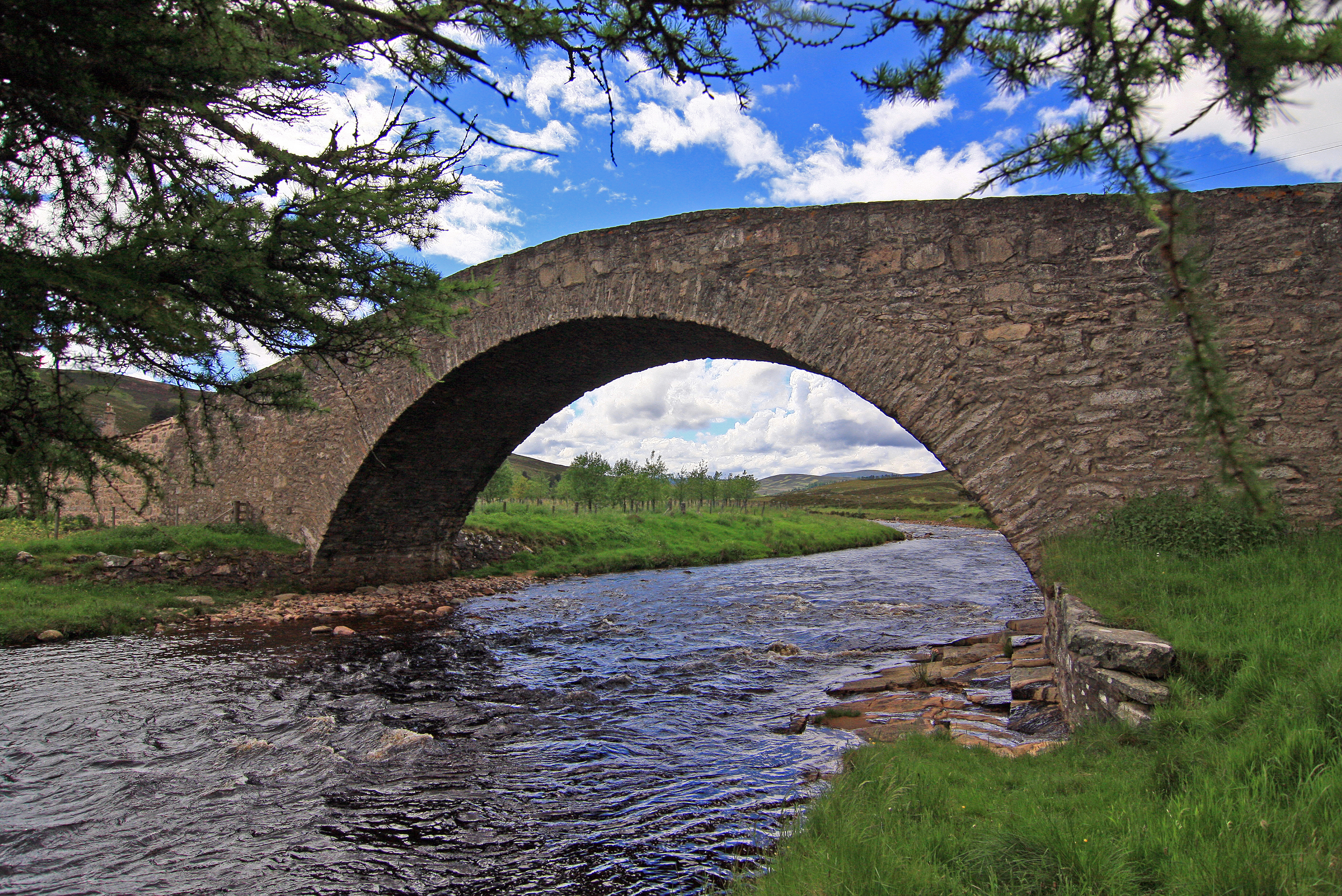
- Bridge across the River Gairn
- Coordinates: 57.09332°N 3.16528°W
- OS grid reference: NJ 29488 00862
- Crosses: River Gairn
- Locale: Aberdeenshire
- Followed by: Gairnshiel Jubilee Bridge

Characteristics
- Design: Arch
- Material: Stone
- No. of spans: 1

Listed Building – Category A
- Official name: Gairnshiel Bridge Over River Gairn
- Designated: 15 April 1971
- Reference no.: LB6747

Location
- Interactive map of Gairnshiel Bridge

Gairnshiel Bridge is a road bridge that crosses the River Gairn in Aberdeenshire, Scotland.

The bridge was built the mid-18th century. It is Category A listed, having been upgraded from being B listed on 9 June 1994.

The bridge has been closed on numerous occasions due to damage from vehicular traffic. On 11 December 2020, planning permission was granted for a replacement bridge. The new bridge, which has been named the Gairnshiel Jubilee Bridge, was opened in August 2023. The original bridge has been retained for use by pedestrians and cyclists.

In May 2025, the new bridge was named as one of the winners of the annual Royal Incorporation of Architects in Scotland (RIAS) awards, and thereby longlisted for the RIAS Best Building in Scotland Award. The judges described it as "a fine example of how to integrate a modern vehicular bridge into a sensitive landscape".

== See also ==
- List of bridges in Scotland
