= Abergeldie Castle =

Tower house in Aberdeenshire, Scotland

Coordinates: 57.043323°N 3.176467°W

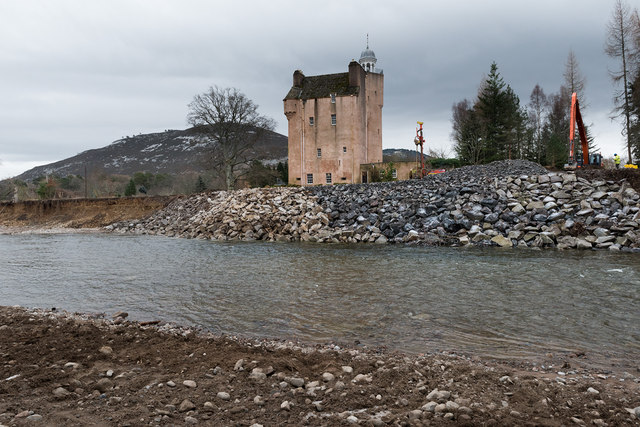
- Abergeldie Castle in 2016
- Interactive map of the Abergeldie Castle area

General information
- Location: Crathie and Braemar parish, Aberdeenshire, Scotland
- Completed: 1550

Abergeldie Castle is a four-floor tower house in Crathie and Braemar parish, Aberdeenshire, Scotland. It stands at an altitude of 840 feet (260 m), on the south bank of the River Dee, five miles (8 km) west of Ballater, and about two miles (3 km) east of the royal residence of Balmoral Castle. Behind it rises Creag nam Ban, a rounded granite hill about 527 metres (1,729 ft) high, and across the river to its front is the cairn-crowned Geallaig Hill, rising to 743 metres (2,438 ft).

It is protected as a category A listed building. The castle was the home of the Baron of Abergeldie.

== History ==
The name derives from the Pictish language, and means the "Confluence of Geldie," a reference to its location near the confluence of River Geldie and River Dee.

A late Bronze Age standing stone, about 6.5 feet high, 2.5 feet wide, and 1.25 feet thick on the lawn of the castle is one indicator of the great antiquity of this site, and its long occupation by man. It also has one of the longest unbroken records of ownership, being in the hands of the Gordon family for 600 years.

It was most likely built around 1550 by Sir Alexander Gordon of Midmar, son of the first Earl of Huntly, on grounds acquired by the Gordon family in 1482. The interior has been returned to its original state, restored by a descendant of the builder.

During the course of the first Jacobite rising in 1689–90, the castle was besieged by Jacobite forces. However, following the defeat of General Buchan's Jacobite forces by Sir Thomas Livingstone at Cromdale on 1 May 1690, General Hugh Mackay of Scourie marched with some cavalry and 1,400 Williamite Dutch infantry (probably including his own former regiment) to lift the siege.

It figured again in the 1715 Jacobite Rising, being garrisoned by government troops (having then only recently been renovated by Rachel Gordon, 10th Heiress, and her husband, Captain Charles Gordon, who had also built nearby Birkhall, later sold to the current royal family), and again in the short 1719 Rising, when it was briefly garrisoned by Spanish troops.

In 1848, Prince Albert, Queen Victoria's Consort, purchased the lease of the Abergeldie Estate for 40 years, as it was relatively close to the new royal residence of Balmoral. Birkhall, with an estate of 6,500 acres, was bought from the Gordons by Albert, the Prince Consort, about the same time (though there has long been a local rumour that the Laird lost Birkhall in a card game).

After his marriage in 1863, Albert Edward, Prince of Wales, whose family nickname was 'Bertie', stayed every year at Abergeldie, indulging his twin passions of shooting by day and card games by night. According to an entry in W. E. Gladstone's 1871 diary, Albert Edward one night asked Gladstone to drive over from Balmoral to dine. Gladstone was charmed by his manner, but not his gaming morals.

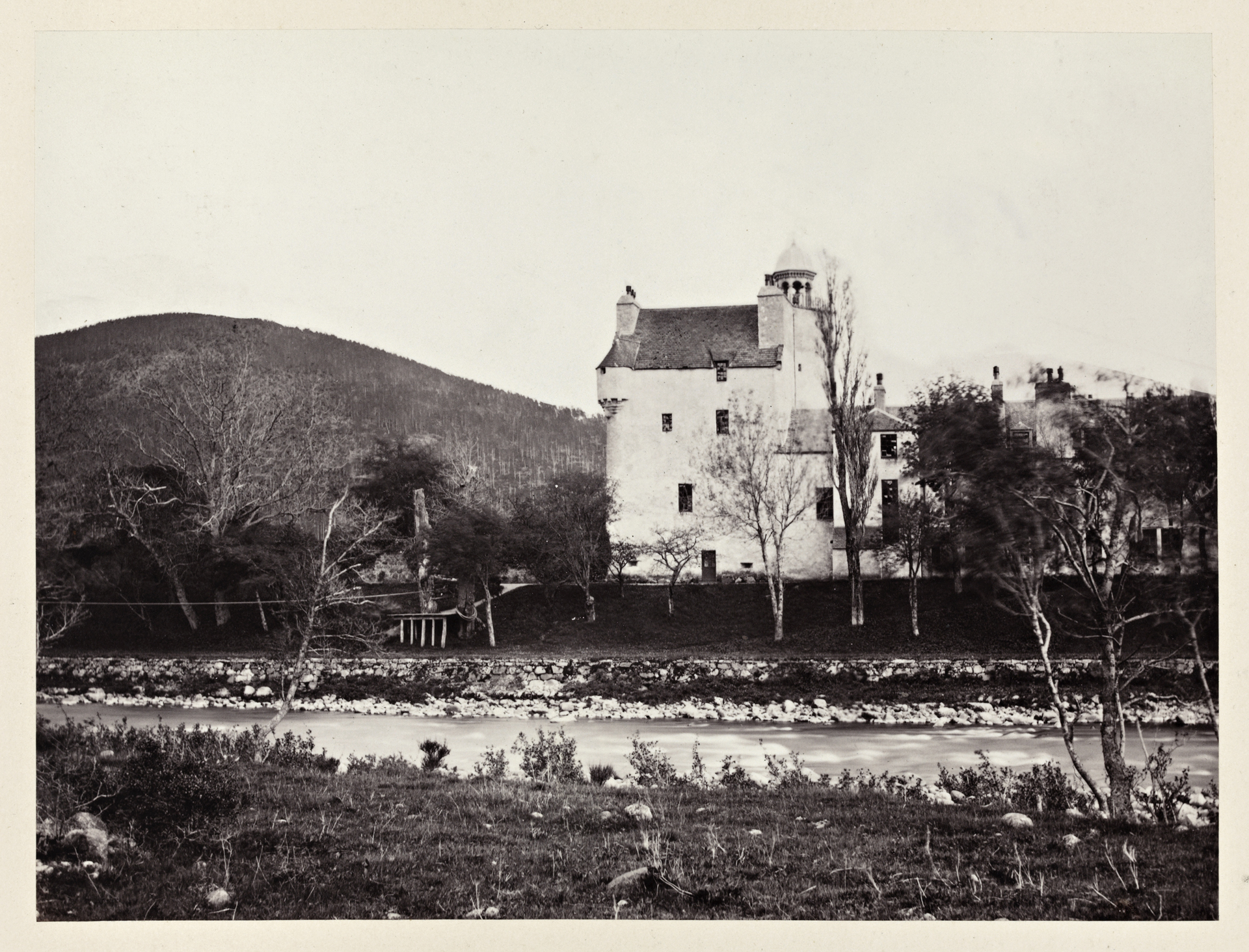
The castle in 1869

The Ordnance Gazetteer of Scotland mentions that the Duchess of Kent spent several autumns here between 1850 and 1861, and that the Empress Eugénie passed the October there following the loss of her son The Prince Imperial (1879), and that it was used as a summer residence and shooting box for the then Prince of Wales (who later became Edward VII).

After the accession of King Edward VII in 1901, it was used by his son, the Prince of Wales (later King George V) in 1902. Other members of the royal family who stayed at Abergeldie included the daughters of Edward VII, Princesses Louise, Victoria and Maud of Wales.

Birkhall remains in the royal family's possession; King Charles III spent time here when he was Duke of Rothesay, together with Queen Camilla.

Abergeldie Castle was last occupied by the 21st Laird, John Seton Howard Gordon (1938–2020), who had lived there since 1972 (the lands having been previously on lease to the royal family's Balmoral Estate, who had their lease on the game lands renewed in the year 2000).

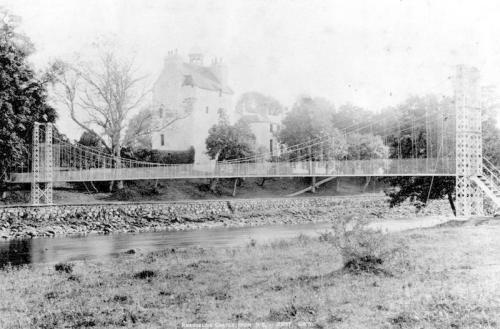
Suspension bridge over the River Dee at Abergeldie Castle

In January 2016, the castle was threatened by rising flood waters from the River Dee, which washed away much of the land behind the building, leaving it on a precipice over the river, thus forcing the 76-year-old Laird to flee. For a time, authorities were uncertain if the castle could be saved if the flooding continued. A few days later, structural engineers were confident that shoring efforts would prevent imminent collapse.

== Structure ==
The castle is an imposing building, its oldest part being a turreted square block tower of the "tower house" type, with rectangular-plan tower measuring around 35 by 28 feet (10.7 by 8.5 m), with a round stair tower 15 feet (4.6 m) across at the south-west corner. The walls are 4 feet thick, as was common for the unsettled nature of the times. Tradition suggests that the castle was originally surrounded by a moat, but no trace exists today. In the 18th century, a wing was added to the 16th-century structure. In the early 19th century, an ogee-roofed belfry was built at the top of the stair tower, and a Venetian window inserted in the south façade. W. D. Simpson noted similarities between Abergeldie and the Castle of Balfluig at Alford, suggesting that they may have shared a designer.

The estate grounds extend ten miles (16 km) along Deeside, and consist of 11,700 acres (4,700 ha) planted with Scotch pine, larch, and birch, mixed in the private grounds with spruce, ash, plane, and sycamore.

== Ghost ==
The castle is said to be haunted by the spirit of a French serving woman named Catherine (or Kittie) Rankie (or Frankie), also known as French Kate. She was accused of being a witch, and was imprisoned in the cellars before being burned at the stake on nearby Craig-na-Ban (Gaelic Creag-na-Ban – Rock of the Women), which overlooks the castle. Since that time, Kate's ghost has been said to have been seen in the cellars and in the clock tower.
