= Harthill Castle =

Castle in Aberdeenshire, Scotland

- Aberdeenshire, Scotland
- Harthill Castle before 1914

Site information
- Type: Z-plan castle
- Open to the public: No
- Condition: Restored; occupied

Location
- Coordinates: 57.3156°N 2.5214°W

Site history
- Built: First castle: by 15th century; Second castle: 1601 or 1638

Harthill Castle is a large 17th-century Z-plan castle, about 5.5 miles (9 km) west-north-west of Inverurie, Aberdeenshire, Scotland, south of Kirkton of Oyne.

An alternative name is Torries Castle.

== History ==
The first Harthill Castle was built no later than the 15th century. The Leith family held the property from 1531, and they probably built the currently standing castle: dates of 1601 or 1638 are disputed. Patrick Leith served with James Graham, 1st Marquess of Montrose, but was captured and beheaded by John Middleton, 1st Earl of Middleton. The last Leith of Harthill is believed to have set the castle on fire deliberately.

The Erskines of Pittodrie acquired the property.

Having been reduced to a roofless shell it was restored in the 1970s and is still occupied; restoration was completed in 1978.

== Structure ==
The castle has a main block comprising four storeys and a garret. There are towers at opposite corners: a square and a round one. The walls are pierced by gun loops, while there are bartizans at the corners.

Parts of a gatehouse and of a courtyard wall remain; they have been incorporated into a rebuilt wall. The castle entrance is in the re-entrant angle.

There is a vaulted basement, which contained a guardroom. A turnpike stair ascends from the basement of the square tower, but there were also stairs from the kitchen and the wine cellar to the hall on the first floor. The round tower has a dome-vaulted cellar. The hall, which was a fine chamber, had stone seats and a large fireplace. Spiral staircases in the thickness of the walls led to private chambers above and in the towers.

The building contains a small wallhead walkway above the upper storeys.

== See also ==
- Castles in Great Britain and Ireland
- List of castles in Scotland
