= Bourtie Parish Church =

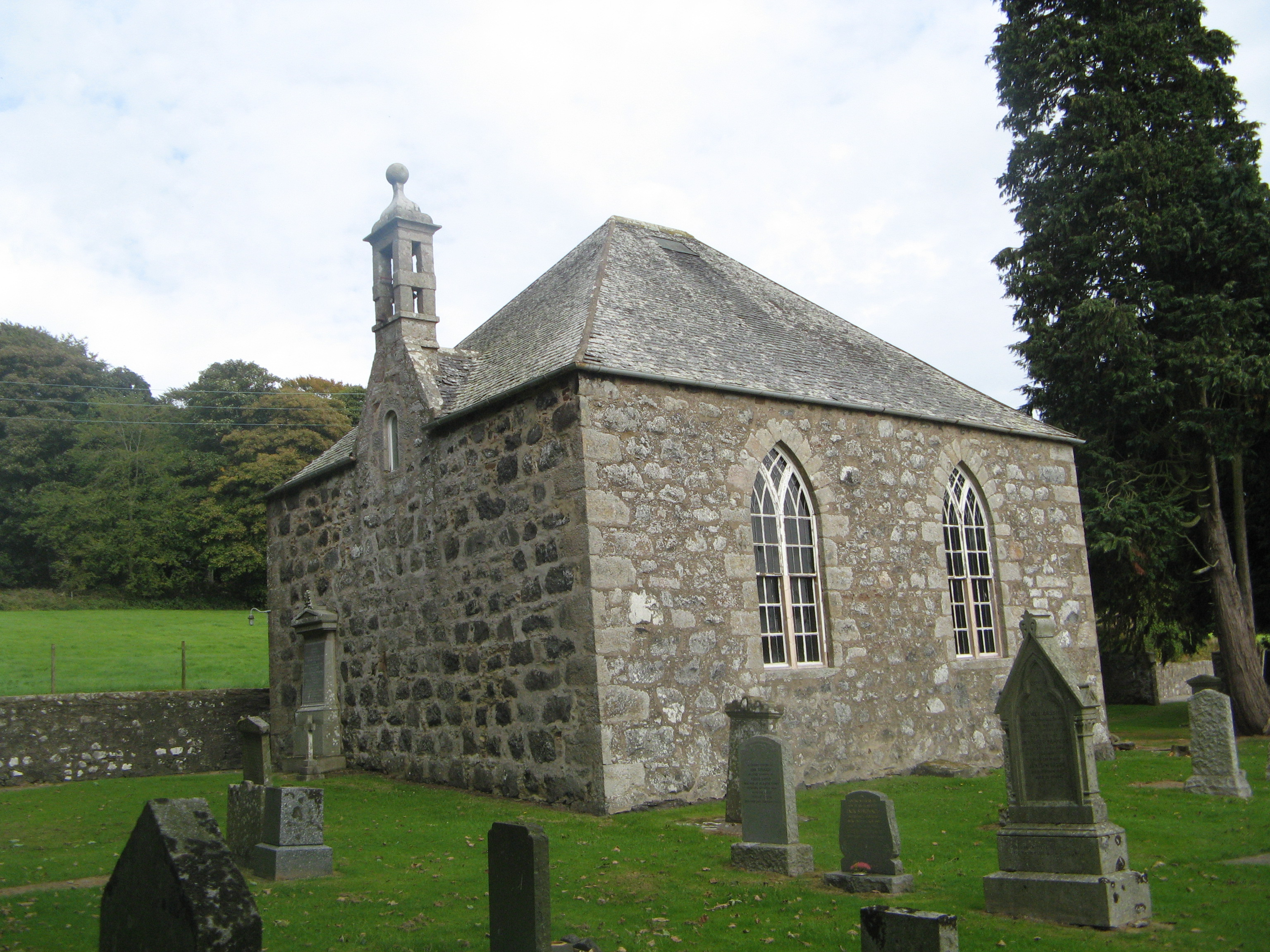
- The church in 2013
- Bourtie Parish Church
- 57°18′50″N 2°19′34″W
- Location: Bourtie, Aberdeenshire
- Country: Scotland

History
- Status: Open

Architecture
- Completed: 1806 (220 years ago)

Bourtie Parish Church is a church in Bourtie, near Oldmeldrum in Aberdeenshire, Scotland. Now a Category A listed building, it was built in 1806, to a design by William and Andrew Clerk, and is a near-square form.

Its ogee-canopied pulpit is original, with precentor's box and other fittings. The church's bell was made in 1760 by John Mowat.
