= Barra Castle =

L-plan tower house in Aberdeenshire

Coordinates: 57.1919°N 2.2048°W

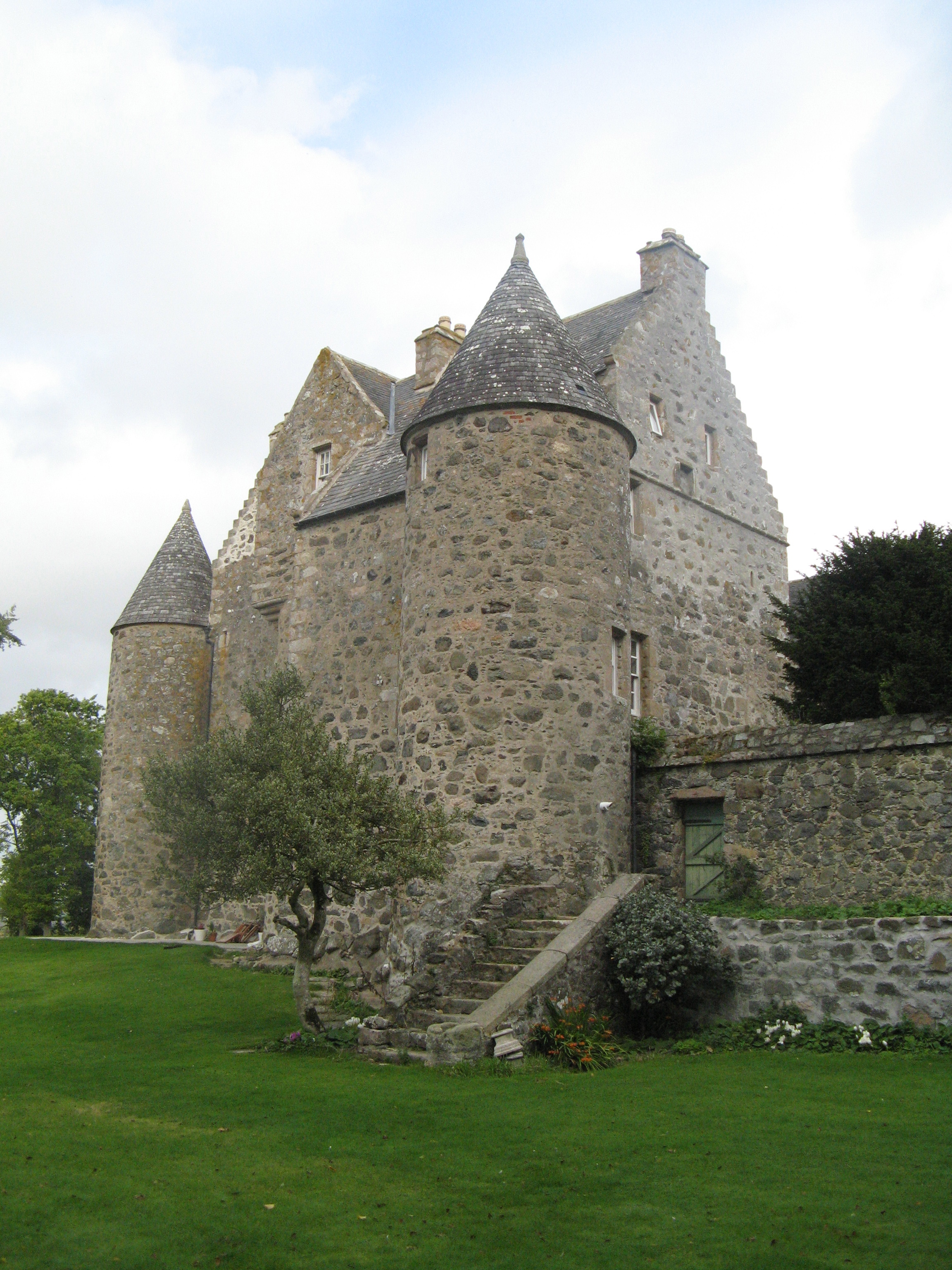
Side view of Barra Castle

Barra Castle is an unusual L-plan tower house dating from the early 16th century, about two miles (three kilometres) south of Oldmeldrum, above the Lochter Burn, in the parish of Bourtie, Aberdeenshire, Scotland. It occupies the site of the Battle of Inverurie (1308), in which Robert Bruce defeated John Comyn, Earl of Buchan.

== History ==
A castle on this site was, from the mid-13th century, the seat of the King family.

An earlier castle associated with the hereditary Forester and Coroner of the Garioch, a Blackhall, may be incorporated in the main block and south-eastern wing, but the present castle owes its form mainly to George Seton, chancellor of the University of Aberdeen, Tutor and Vicar of Meldrum who was granted the estate in 1598. A charter of 1599 to George Seton, tutor of Meldrum, mentions the erection of the lands of Barra as a free barony, while a charter of 1615, ordains that the 'fortalice of Barra' is to be the chief seat of the barony.

James Reid, an Aberdeen advocate, was in possession of the estate by 1630, and the Reid family retained it until 1754. Dame Margaret Abercrombie, the wife of John Reid (who was made a baronet in 1703), refitted parts of the house; she may be responsible for the fireplace in the Great Hall.

The purchaser in 1754 was John Ramsay of Melrose, a merchant trading in Russia, who added the north wing, and his descendants still own it; a Ramsay heiress married Andrew Irvine, one of the Irvines of Drum, early in the 20th century. John Ramsay preferred his estate at Straloch, and after his death in 1787 the property came to be used as a farmhouse. It was restored as a dower house, to plans by George Bennet Mitchell, in the first decade of the twentieth century.

== Structure ==
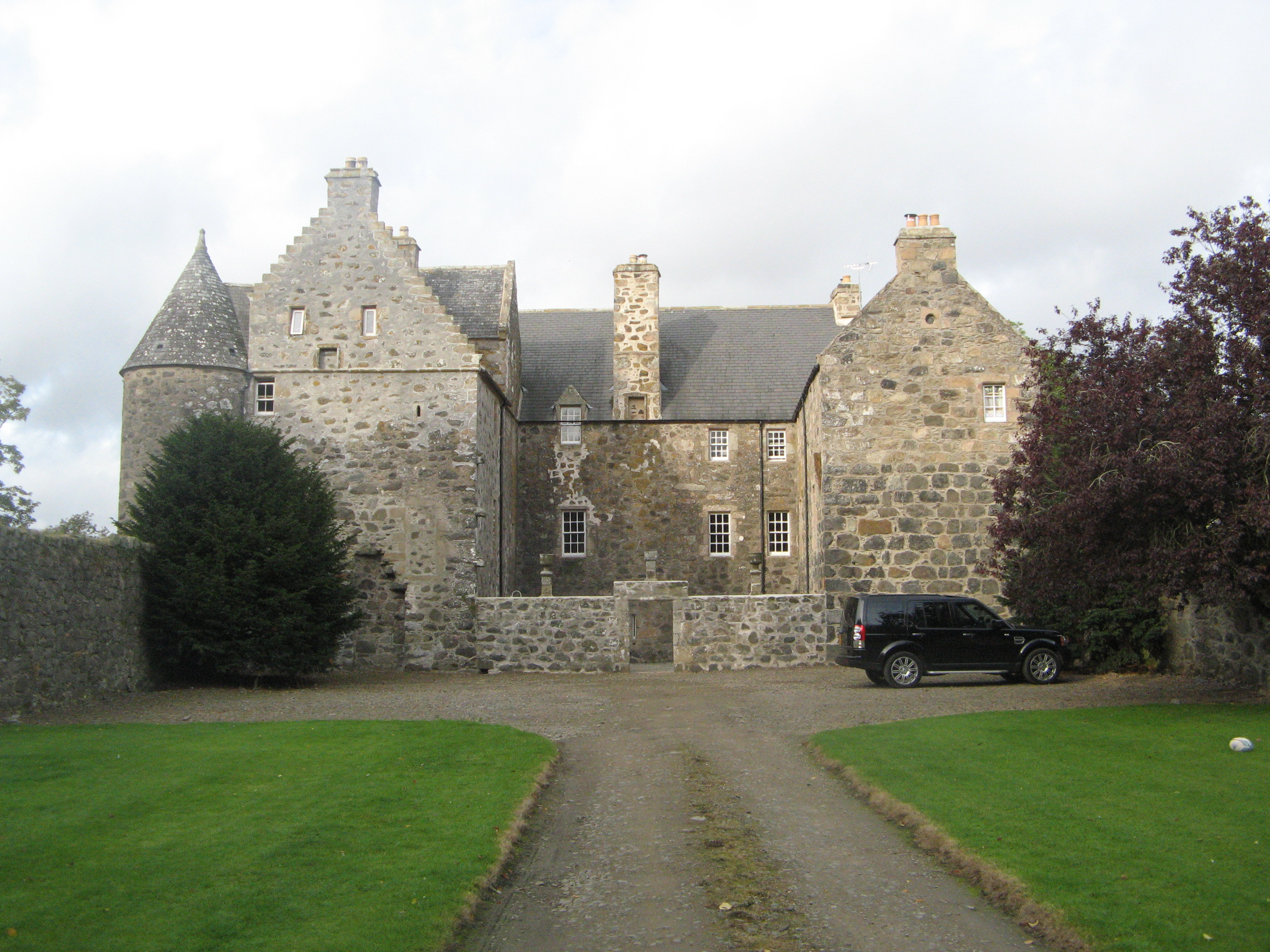
Barra Castle

The plan of the castle is an unusual variation on the L-plan, with the main block of the castle lying north to south. There is a circular tower at the south-west. A D-plan tower at the south-east contains the main stair and entrance. This tower, corbelled square at the top to give a watch room, links to a large square wing. At its north-west angle, this wing has a second circular tower. The castle’s entrance is in the main re-entrant angle. The towers have conical roofs.

Running eastward from the north end of the main block there is an addition, dating from the 18th century. A wall to the east, which contains the entrance, forms the fourth side of a square court.

The buildings around the courtyard are three storeys high, built of pinned boulder rubble. The main gables are crow stepped. The drawing room, which is panelled, has a large chimneypiece, with a later one inserted in it. The first floor bedroom in the South-East wing has panelling, dating from the early to mid-18th century. There is a panelled sitting room in the North wing.

The castle is a category A listed building and is constructed on the site of Robert the Bruce's successful battle against John Comyn, Earl of Buchan in 1308.

The Hunterian Museum, Glasgow has a hammerstone from Barra Castle.

== Paintings ==
There are two paintings of the interior of the castle by James Cassie in the Aberdeen Art Gallery:

- The Kitchen, 1854
- On the terrace, 1854
Images of Barra Castle by James Cassie, held by Aberdeen Art Gallery

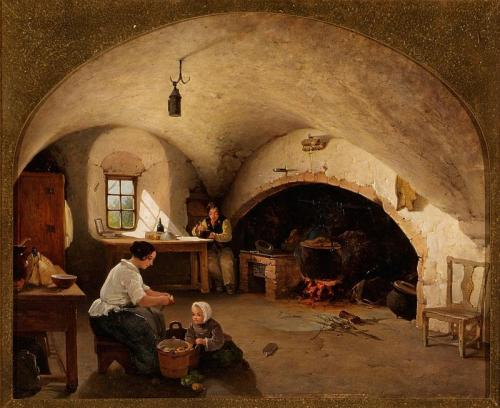
The Kitchen of Barra Castle, Aberdeenshire - by James Cassie

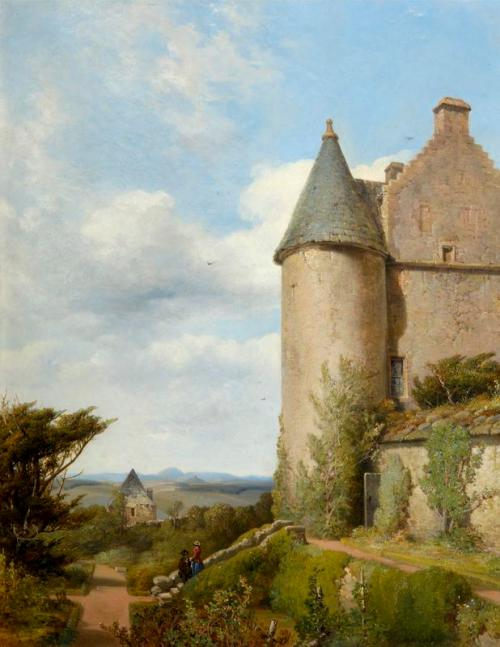
On the Terrace, Barra Castle, Aberdeenshire - by James Cassie
