= Garlogie Beam Engine =

Scottish steam engine, built in 1833

Coordinates: 57.139878°N 2.3615573°W

The Garlogie Beam Engine is a steam powered beam engine, built in 1833, that once powered a woollen mill at Garlogie, Aberdeenshire. It is a rare survivor of the Industrial Revolution and the oldest steam engine of any kind still in its original location in Scotland. It contains what is believed to be the oldest cast iron engine beam in the world, dating from 1805.

== History ==
In 1799, Thomas Black built a three-story wool-spinning mill at Garlogie, west of Aberdeen on the site of an earlier waulk mill. Both were powered by water wheels fed from the Leuchar Burn. Following bankruptcy in 1832, the mill was bought by Alexander Hadden, who already had a large mill at The Green in Aberdeen.

To provide power when water levels were low, Haddens installed a beam engine in the mid-1830s. A coal gas plant, added in the 1840s, provided light in the mill, replacing open flames. The engine cylinder was replaced in 1870 and a Hercules turbine installed in c. 1890, replacing the 1827 water wheel.

Cheaper fabric imports forced Garlogie Mill to close in 1904. Haddens sold the mill machinery at public auction in July 1905. They kept the mill buildings in good condition, hoping to attract a buyer. Eventually, in June 1918, Lord Cowdray, owner of the Skene estates, purchased the mill. He utilised the mill water supply to generate electric power for Dunecht House.

Most of the other buildings were demolished in 1934. The south wing was converted into a village hall in 1931. The surviving engine house is Category A-listed. Dunecht Estates gifted the remains of the mill site to the council in 1993. Gordon District Council and North-East Scotland Museums Service converted the site into a Museum of Power in 1994–95, and it operated until 2000.

== Beam Engine ==
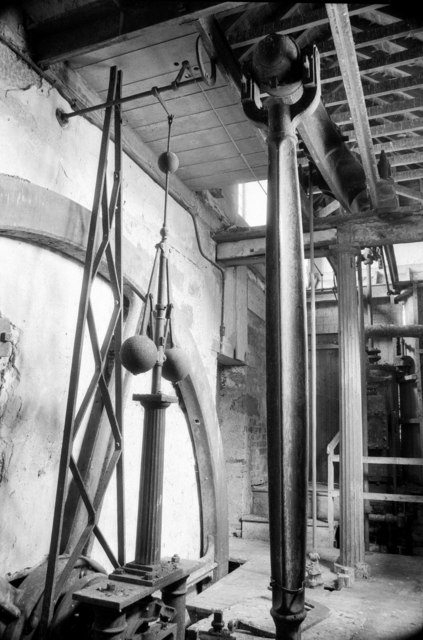
Beam engine in 1982

The engine was built in 1833, using parts, including the beam, from a Boulton and Watt engine supplied to Hadden's Aberdeen factory in 1805.

The engine has a single vertical cylinder with an 18-inch bore. Steam acts on both sides of the piston and is controlled by a slide valve assembly on the side of the cylinder. The valve design is inefficient as steam is cut off late in the piston travel. The 16 ft 6in beam is supported by a cast iron column under its pivot and by substantial iron girders built into the walls of the engine house. The 16 ft (4.9 m) diameter cast iron flywheel has a barring plate set into the wall behind.

A parallel linkage on the beam allows the piston rod to move in a straight line. A separate condenser and air pump improved the efficiency over earlier cylinders by reducing heat loss from the cylinder. Both developments were introduced to engines by James Watt.

== Hydro-power turbine ==
In the 1920s, Lord Cowdray had a hydro-power turbine plant built on the site. He installed a second dam on the Leuchar Burn with a concrete penstock along the course of the previous mill lade to a large surge tank. The 1923 72 kW Escher Wyss plant supplied electricity to Dunecht House and estate. It ran until the mid-1960s.

== Garlogie Beam Engine Trust ==
The Garlogie Beam Engine Trust was formed in 2019 and established a 99-year lease with Aberdeenshire Council from July 2023. It has held public open days throughout the summer of 2024.

Work has started to restore the beam engine and water turbine. The trust's vision is for the site to become a working museum, telling the story of the mill and providing educational opportunities.
