= Corsindae House =

16th-century castle in Scotland

Coordinates: 57.1683°N 2.5209°W

Corsindae House is a 16th-century castle, originally L-plan, about 8 miles (13 km) north of Banchory, Aberdeenshire, Scotland, and 1 mile (1.6 km) north of Midmar.

== History ==
The castle, built around 1580, was a property of the Sinclairs, of whom John Forbes was accused of murder in 1605. Corsindae Castle is still lived in. There have been several additions, including one thought to be by Lord Braco in 1726, up to 1840.

== Structure ==
Corsindae House comprises a L-plan tower house with three storeys and an attic. In the re-entrant angle is a round stair tower. A large mansion has been added, so that the whole is now U-plan. All is harled and whitewashed. There is a vaulted basement.

== See also ==
- Castles in Great Britain and Ireland
- List of castles in Scotland
