= Oyne =

Coordinates: 57°19′16″N 2°32′44″W

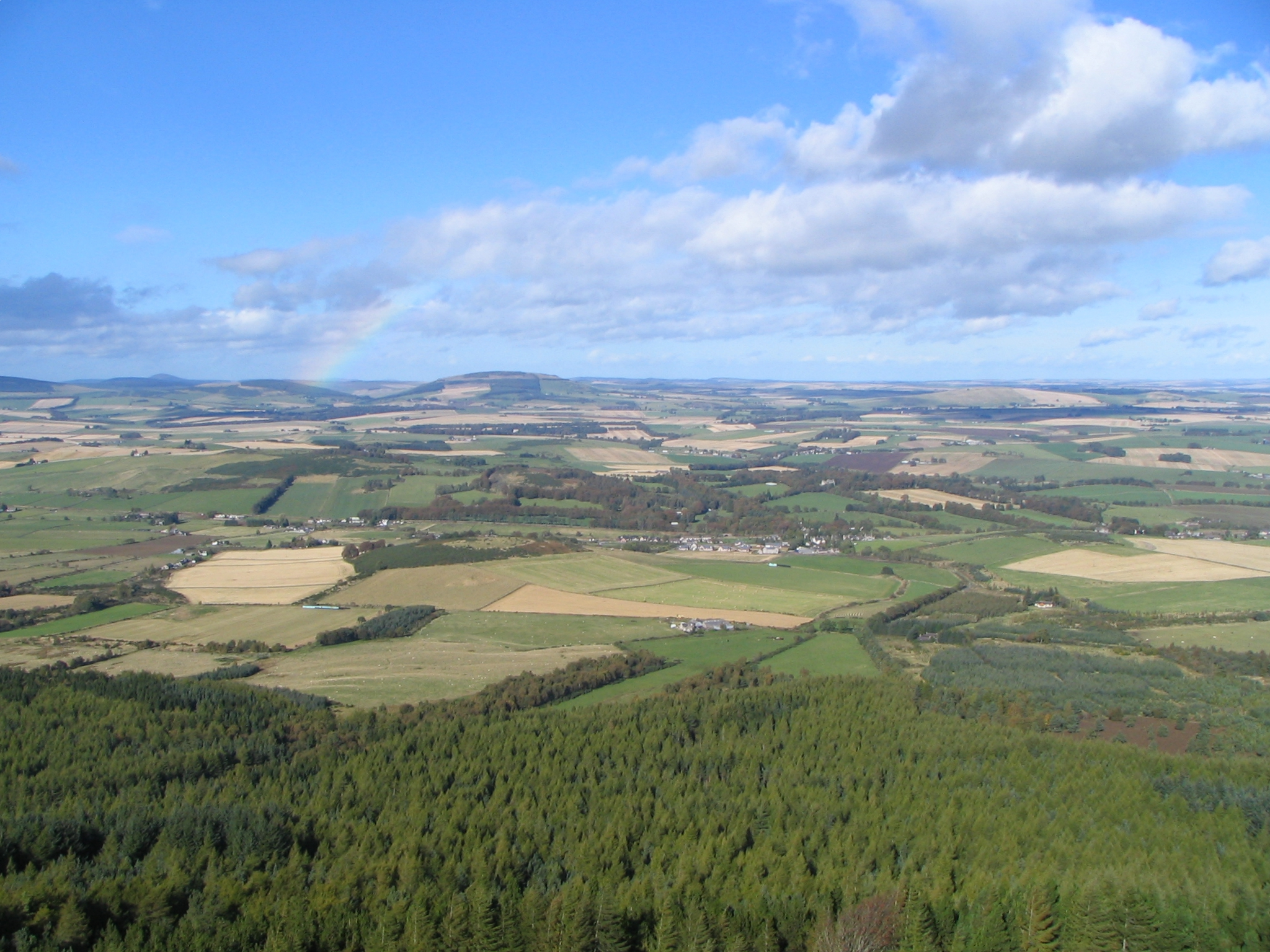
- A picture of Oyne taken from Bennachie

- Location within Aberdeenshire
- OS grid reference: NJ672259
- Council area: Aberdeenshire
- Lieutenancy area: Aberdeenshire
- Country: Scotland
- Sovereign state: United Kingdom
- Post town: INSCH
- Postcode district: AB52
- Police: Scotland
- Fire: Scottish
- Ambulance: Scottish
- UK Parliament: Gordon and Buchan
- Scottish Parliament: Aberdeenshire West

Oyne is a small village in rural Aberdeenshire at the bottom of Bennachie in Scotland.

== Locality ==
It once had a railway station which closed 6 May 1968, and now has a daily bus service to Inverurie 8 miles (13 km) away and to Huntly. The area is popular with commuters to Inverurie/Huntly/Aberdeen. The area has a number of large private houses such as Westhall House, which was a small hotel until the 1990s. The Horn family were lairds of Westhall.

Oyne School is in the centre of the village of Oyne, is non-denominational and the catchment area is the village of Oyne and the surrounding rural area. The school has around 50 pupils and 3 teachers. The main school building dates back to 1874.

Oyne is also the nearest settlement to the now-defunct Arecholink Pre-History Park, which was built in 1997 but closed due to dwindling visitor numbers in 2011. The empty visitor centre remains in place as of 2024.

== Harthill Castle ==
Harthill Castle

Of note is the ancient seat of the family of Leith of Harthill, Harthill Castle (sometimes called 'Torries'), which stands close to the parish church. It dates from at least the 15th century and was extensively restored in 1638 by John Leith, the "violent laird". The castle was set on fire in the late 17th century, possibly by John's son, Patrick Leith, to prevent it from falling into the hands of Leith creditors. It stood as a ruin for the next 300 years.

Ann Tweedy Savage purchased the castle in 1975 and with Slessor Troup, one of the area's top master masons, restored it between 1975 and 1977. The restoration work won the Saltire Award in 1977.

Harthill Castle is a pink-washed Z-plan twin-tower building, seven storeys (77 ft or 23 m) high, made of solid granite, and set in woodland and farmland in Oyne at the foot of Bennachie. The ground floor is vaulted and has arrow slits and musket holes for windows. The next two storeys are partially vaulted. There are circular staircases in each tower, each rising counter-clockwise. The Great Hall has a 17-foot (5.2 m) fireplace that predates the building and was probably brought to the property by the Leiths from their previous home.

Famous residents include Tim Lyons, whose work can be seen in How To Train Your Dragon and The Northman and Netflix's Lift.
