= Midmar Castle =

Castle in Aberdeenshire, Scotland

Coordinates: 57.1372°N 2.4896°W

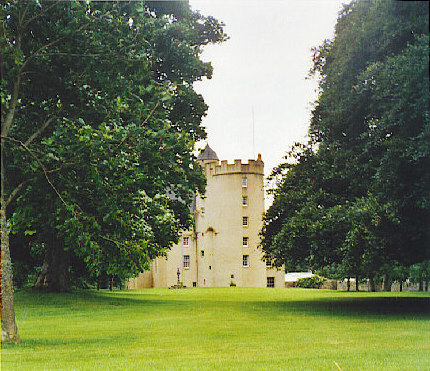
Midmar Castle

Midmar Castle is a 16th-century castle in Aberdeenshire, Scotland, located 12 kilometres (7.5 mi) west of Westhill and 3.5 kilometres (2.2 mi) west of Echt. The castle was built for George Gordon of Midmar and Abergeldie between 1565 and 1575, and was constructed by the stonemason and architect George Bell. The castle is protected as a category A listed building.

== History ==
The present structure was erected on the site of an earlier tower, destroyed by forces loyal to Mary, Queen of Scots, during her punitive expedition against the Earl of Huntly in 1562. This expedition culminated in the Battle of Corrichie at which George Gordon of Midmar fought. He was subsequently deprived of his lands, though they were restored in 1565, after which he employed George Bell to build a new castle. In 1594 the castle was attacked after the Battle of Glenlivet.

Alexander Grant purchased Midmar in 1728 and renamed it Grantsfield. From 1730 the castle was remodelled inside and outside, and most of the present interiors date from this time. Repairs were carried out in 1840. From 1842 until 1977 the castle was uninhabited, though maintained, preserving the 18th-century rooms. Restoration began in 1977 and the castle has been a private residence since. It was sold in July 2011 to Tom Cross, former chief executive of Dana Petroleum, for £2.8 million.

The 16th- or 17th-century walled garden, with bee boles in the walls, is also a category A listed building, along with the 18th-century sundial.
