= Triple Kirks =

1843 building designed for three churches

Coordinates: 57°08′51″N 02°06′10″W

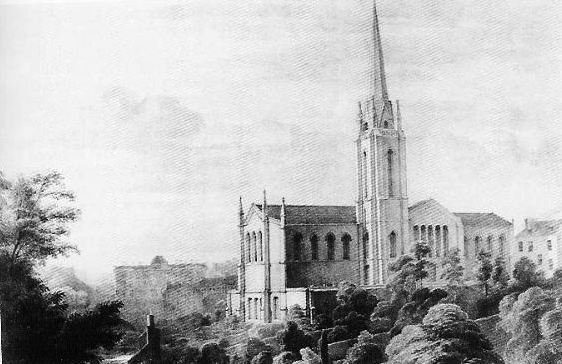
Triple Kirks by James Giles

The Triple Kirks in Aberdeen, Scotland were built at the time of the Disruption of 1843 when the Free Church of Scotland (the Free Kirk) split from the Church of Scotland (the Kirk). The three churches were all part of a single building with a tall spire but they housed separate congregations. The East Free Kirk was completed 1843 followed by the West Free Kirk and South Free Kirk early the following year. From about 1966 the building progressively fell into disuse and became mostly ruinous but with the spire remaining.

Many developments were planned for the site but, after the Secretary of State for Scotland required the spire to be kept, a block of flats called "The Point" was built with the spire protruding from the top.

== 1843 schism in the Church of Scotland ==
For over a century there had been a dispute within Scotland's presbyterian national church about whether the church minister should be appointed by its heritor – its patron or proprietor – or whether the congregation should decide. For churches with full parish status (Note: Full parish status is referred to as quoad civilia.) the heritor – the local landowner (laird) or sometimes the town council – had this privilege by right of patronage, generally without consulting the congregation. For churches that only held religious status (Note: Churches only holding a religious status are referred to as quoad sacra.) the congregations had always been able to make their own appointments. In May 1843, about one third of the ministers across Scotland "came out" to form the Free Church, that is to say they stopped attending their previous churches so forfeiting their livings and they conducted services as and where they could with individual members of their congregations deciding how they would respond. Many congregations were loyal to their ministers and the existing church buildings were abandoned with new churches being built at the congregations' own expense. Patronage was ended in 1874 and the churches reunited in 1929.

In Aberdeen the town council was heritor of the six churches with full parish status but the council had, since the Reformation, always accepted the congregations' views on ministerial appointments. The nine other churches with only religious status had always made their own appointments anyway. Although in Aberdeen there was no practical problem over appointments, all fifteen minsters "came out" in solidarity with parishes elsewhere and ten new free kirks were built. By 1851 there were only seven "established" churches left although there were still all fifteen free churches.

== Construction of the Triple Kirks ==
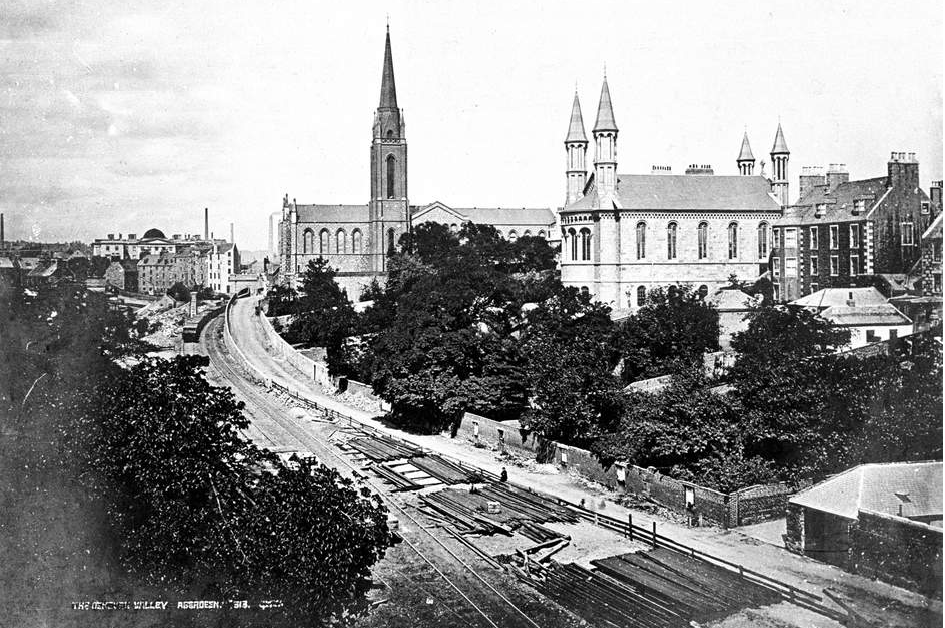
The Denburn valley in 1850. The Triple Kirks is at the centre, beyond the congregational chapel on the right.

In Aberdeen the Disruption had been anticipated and a local committee had taken the initiative in April 1843 of purchasing an old weaving factory which had been derelict since 1830. As the purchasing agent left the estate agent's offices he met someone arriving from the established church attempting to block the sale by making their own purchase. The factory was demolished and a famous Aberdeen architect, Archibald Simpson, was appointed. To save cost he arranged for one building to encompass the three separate congregations – from the East and West parishes of the Kirk of St Nicholas (which had been separately occupying its chancel and nave) and from the newly built South Church (Note: The South church had been built in 1830 and is now the "Slains Castle" pub and restaurant.) in Belmont Street. A high proportion of the parishioners were expected to be coming out and there was to be capacity for all of them. The three churches had entirely separate facilities but there was one shared spire with a design based on that of St. Elizabeth's Church, Marburg. All building was completed by early 1844.

The building costs, £6,000, were kept as low as possible with the walls built of granite rubble, some of it from the demolished factory, and the spire built of salvaged brick. All the same it proved to be a magnificent building. The anti-Disruption Aberdeen Herald wrote "A group of three churches when viewed from Union Bridge has the aspect of a cathedral ... In the angle formed by the nave and south transept rises a lofty square tower, from which springs a spire of airy proportions".

The spire rose to a height of about 190 feet (59 m) above the footing in the Denburn Valley. (Note: As measured from a scale drawing the footing to bring level with the ground to the east: 39 feet (11.8 m); tower: 80 feet (24.3 m); steeple atop tower 75 feet (23.0 m)) The architectural style of the building was for simple lancet arches and Perpendicular Gothic windows with brick dressings. There was squared granite rubble at the level of the ground floor but above there was coarser random granite rubble. There were soft sandstone dressings to the red brick tower and octagonal spire. Effectively, the transept comprised the South Kirk, the chancel was the East Kirk and the nave was the West Kirk. The tower and spire were in the southwest corner between the south and west churches.

== Religious use ==
The site of the churches was to the east of the Denburn Valley, a 34-foot (10.5 m) deep gorge passing north–south through Aberdeen with buildings on both sides of it. In 1864 a railway line was constructed along the valley connecting the existing railways to the north and south so as to provide through running. The tracks were laid on the east side of the valley to avoid the gardens (Note: In 1864 the main area of the Denburn Valley was rather run down although plans were being made for what would eventually become Union Terrace Gardens in 1879.) and the culverted Den Burn to the west. This meant that the Denburn Road had to be shifted east so that it passed very close to, but far below, the gable end of the West Free. Fearing collapse, the congregation left their part of the building for a church elsewhere in the city and eventually the railway company agreed to purchase the entire building for £12,000. The East and South churches, happy to stay put, bought back their portions for £3,000 each, hence making a profit of £1,000 each.

The West church now built a new building for themselves but their congregation soon split and one group bought back the West church for £3,800, partly subsidised by £2,000 from the other two churches. This part of the Triple Kirks was then called the High Free Church. In 1890 the South church moved to a new grand building in Rosemount Viaduct and the East church bought the now vacated transept to be converted into ancillary church accommodation. In 1935 the High Free moved away and by 1966 the west part of the building was unoccupied. In 1972 the East church congregation united with the church on Rosemount Viaduct under the new name of St. Mark's leaving the Triple Kirks building redundant for religious purposes.

In 1952 John Betjeman wrote of Archibald Simpson's creation:

"His greatest work is a brick tower and spire opposite the Art Gallery. The fact that it is in red brick makes it stand out, but not glaringly, among the grey granite of the rest of the city. How can I explain why this tall plain spire is so marvellous that only Salisbury is in my opinion its rival?"

— John Betjeman, First and Last Loves (1952)

== Later use and partial demolition ==
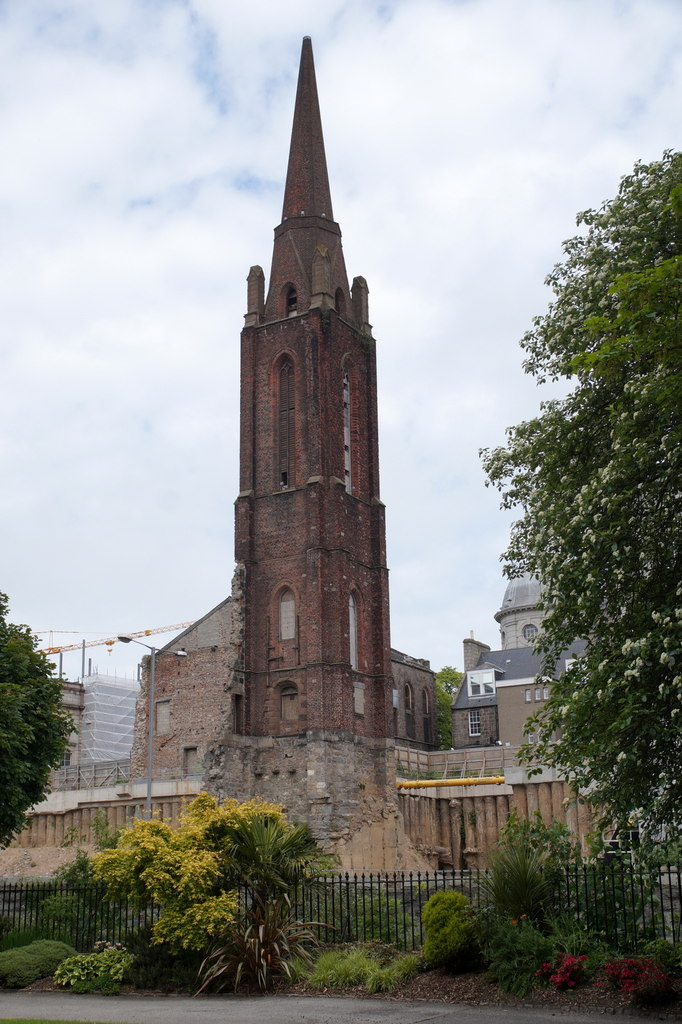
Spire in 2016, viewed from the southwest

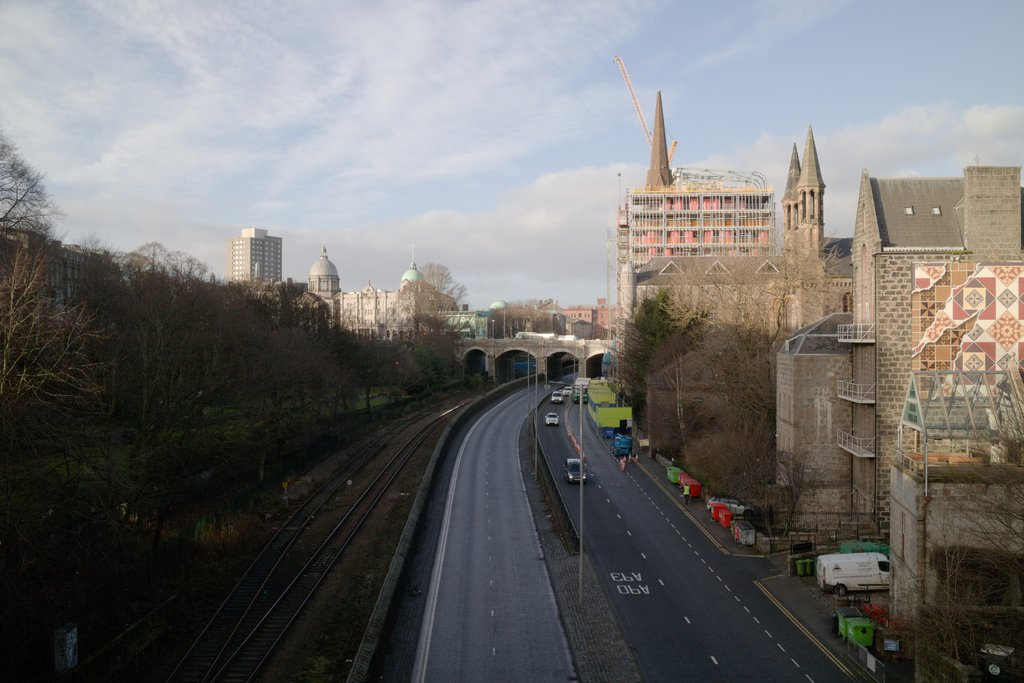
In 2019 with the development surrounding the spire

Very late in its religious life, in 1967, the Triple Kirks were listed as a Category A listed building but all the same the building fell into dilapidation. In 1976 the site was purchased by a London firm of developers with a plan to retain the spire but to surround it with a shopping mall, restaurant, offices and apartments. The council thought this was a fine proposal but the Aberdeen Civic Society proved persuasive in opposing it. By the 1980s the east part was converted to a bar, Simpson's Bar, and later renamed to the Triple Kirks, with the upper storey a dance school. (Note: Now The Triplekirks nightclub.) The southern part became dangerous and was demolished except for three walls which were shored up. Many planning applications followed, including for a seven-storey office block.

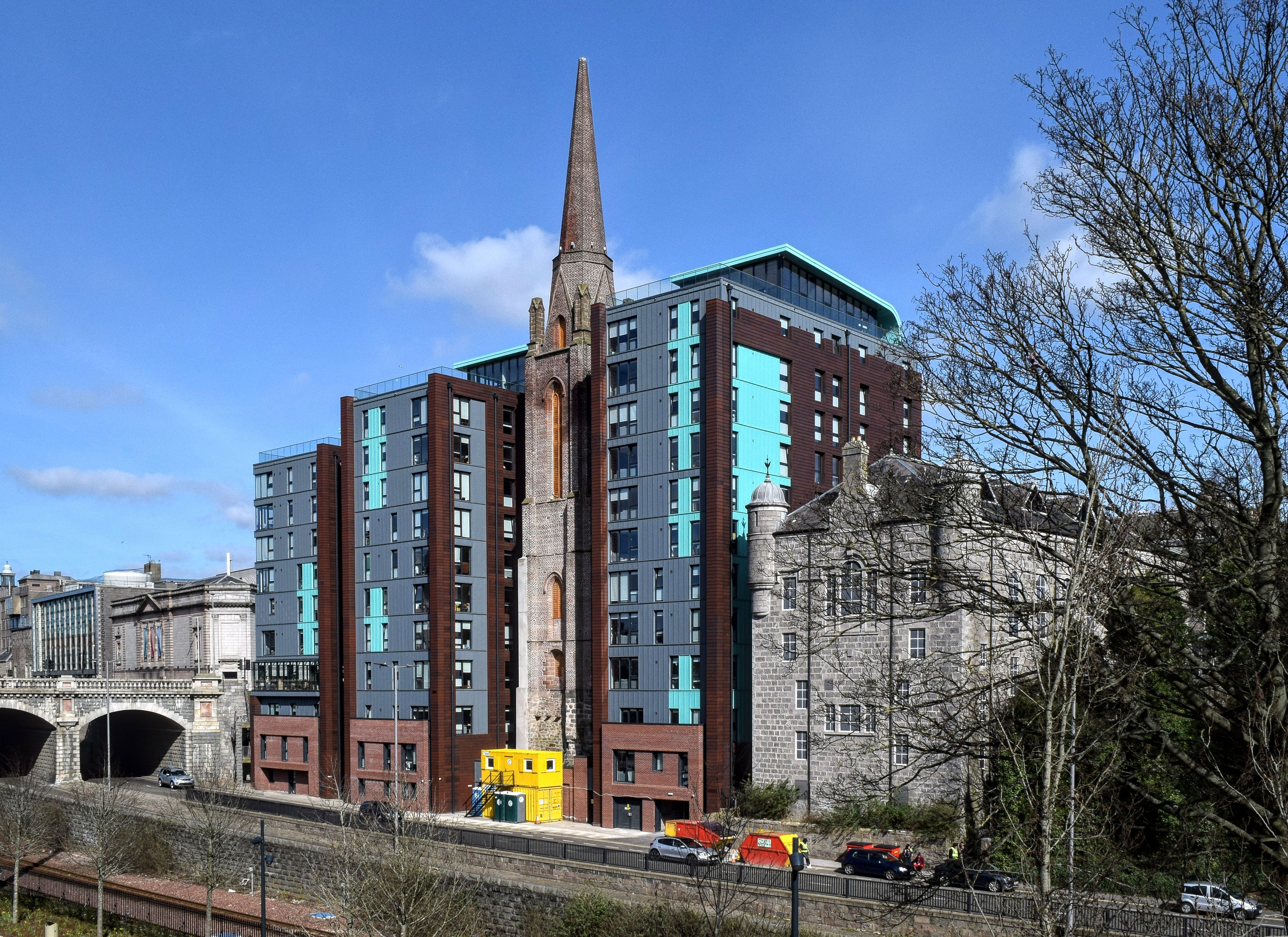
Spire in 2023, emerging from the completed "The Point" development.

The Secretary of State for Scotland intervened requiring the spire to be kept so a plan emerged for a six-storey office block and underground car park, complete with spire. There followed a plan involving a floodlit five-storey-high atrium incorporating the spire, and then for an architectural heritage centre. By this time the developers and planners had forgotten what the building had originally been and kept referring to the "North Kirk" as being part of the site. (Note: The North Kirk is a completely separate church in Aberdeen, half a mile to the east, now Aberdeen Arts Centre.) As of 2018, following a fall in demand for offices, an accommodation development for 347 students was underway but before the end of the year the council approved a change that removed the requirement for the accommodation to be restricted to students because the change would "act as a catalyst for further regeneration in the city centre”.
