= Archibald Simpson =

Scottish architect (1790–1847)

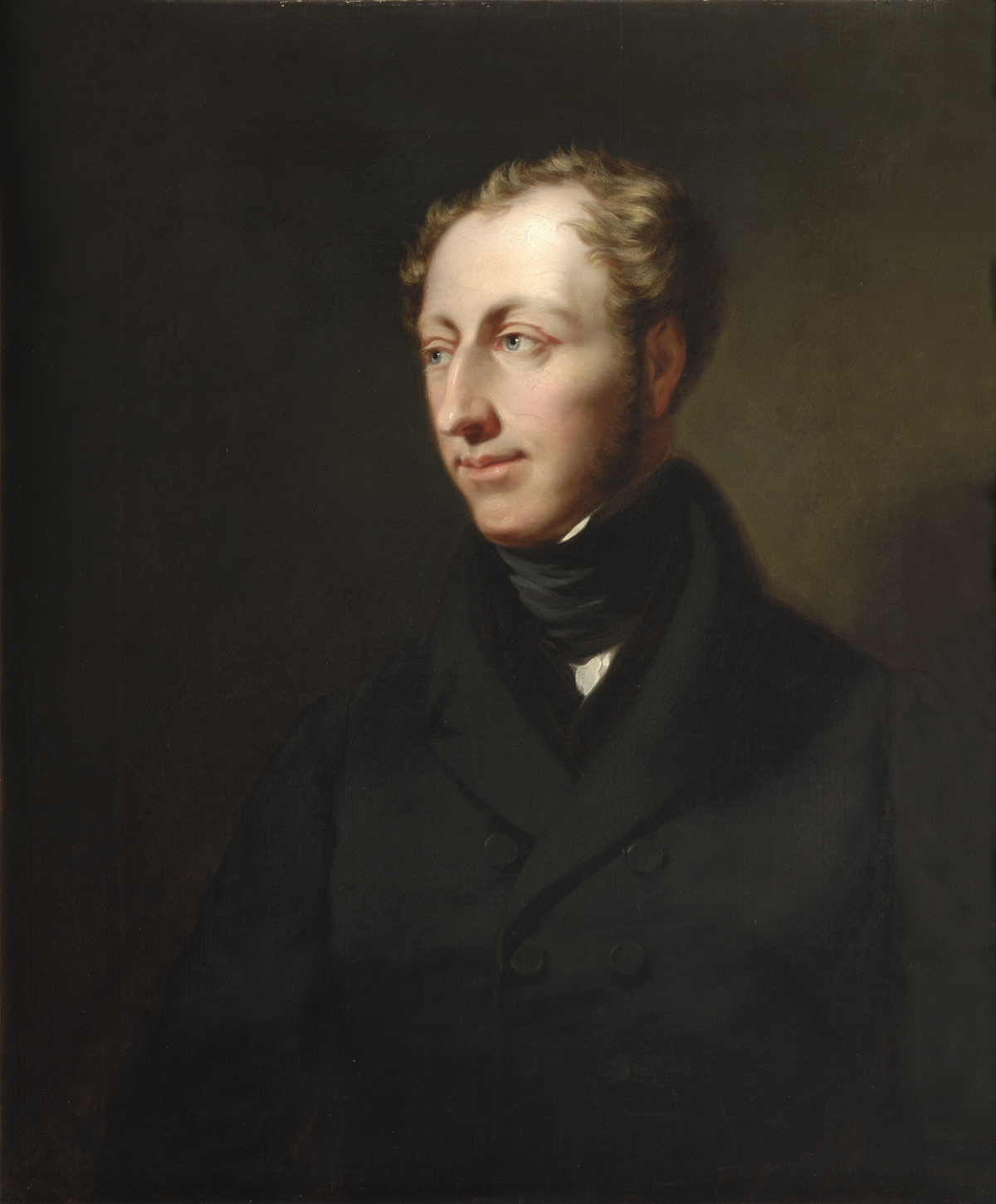
- Portrait of Archibald Simpson by James Giles
- Born: 4 May 1790; Aberdeen, Scotland
- Died: 23 March 1847 (aged 56); Aberdeen, Scotland
- Occupation: Architect
- Buildings: Marischal College; Three Free Churches (The Triple Kirks)
- Projects: Bon Accord Terrace, Square and Crescent

Archibald Simpson (4 May 1790 – 23 March 1847) was a Scottish architect, who along with his rival John Smith, is regarded as having fashioned the character of Aberdeen as "The Granite City".

== Life and work ==
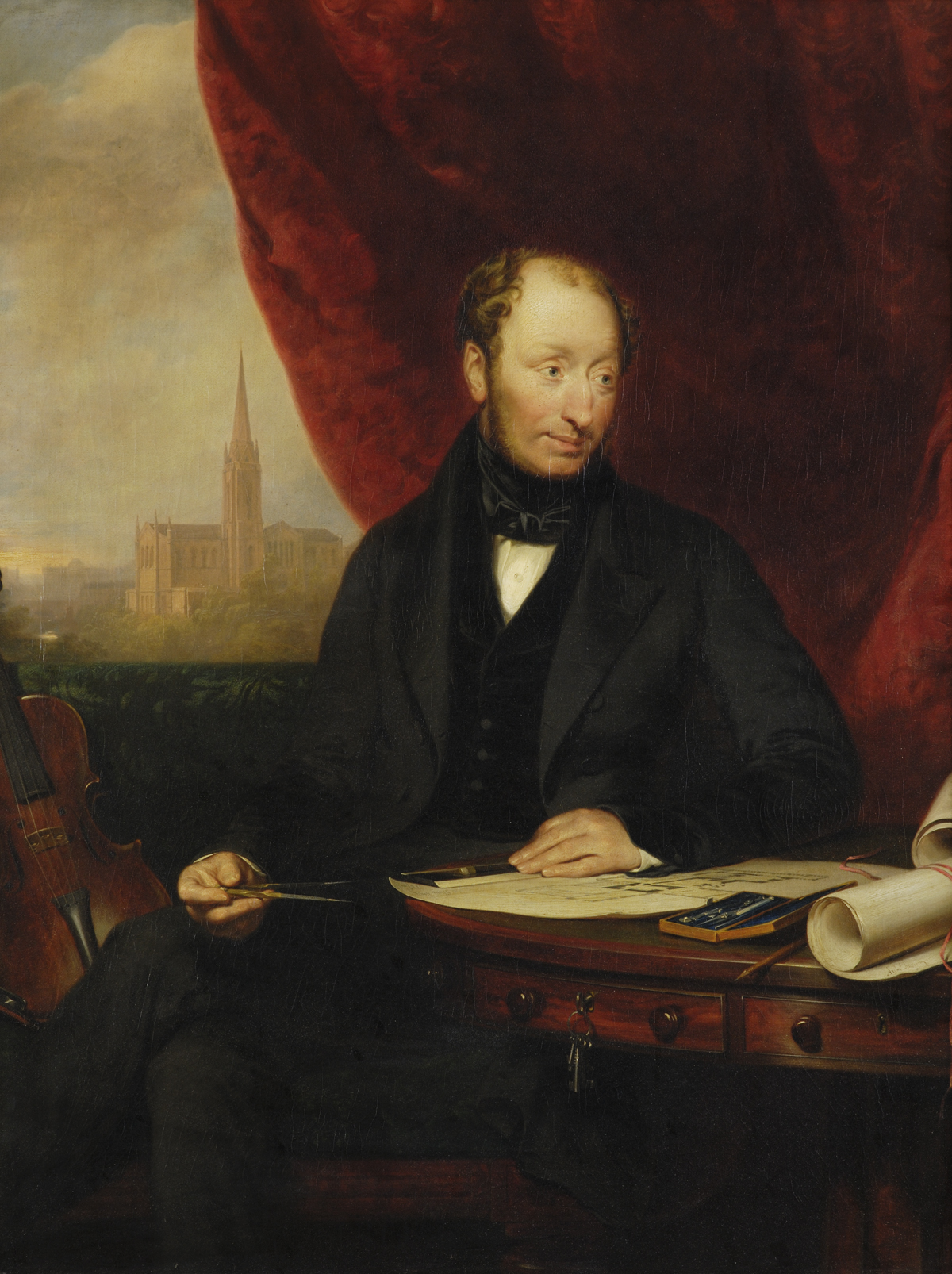
Memorial portrait of Archibald Simpson by James Giles (1848)

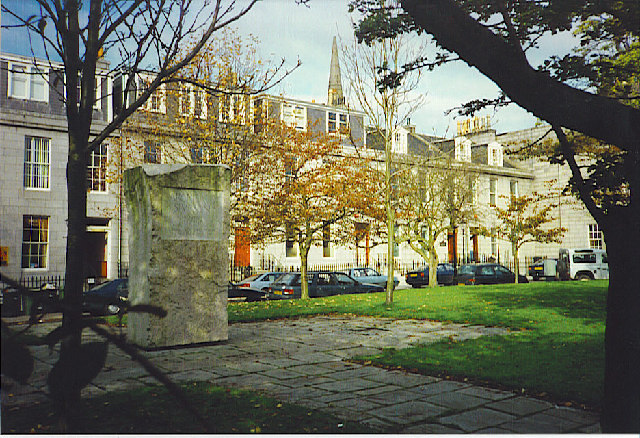
Archibald Simpson Memorial (1975), Bon Accord Square, Aberdeen

=== Early life ===
Archibald Simpson was born at 15 Guestrow, Aberdeen on 4 May 1790, the ninth and last child of William Simpson (1740–1804), a clothier at Broadgate, and his wife Barbara Dauney (c.1750 - 1801), the daughter of a Presbyterian minister. The family house at Guestrow is thought to have been built by his uncle William Dauney, who was a master mason. The house was later demolished in 1930.

Simpson attended Aberdeen Grammar School as a contemporary of Byron, who lived nearby in Broadgate. At 13 he entered Marischal College but left after a year, on the death of his father, to work in the office of James Massie, a builder at Castlehill, having been influenced so by his uncle William Dauney.

Due to being born lame in his left arm, his father left him a legacy of £200 with which at the age of 20 he went to London to be apprenticed to architect Robert Lugar and later David Laing. After two years Simpson left to embark on a study tour of Italy, returning to Aberdeen in 1813 to start an architectural practice in his old house at 15 Guestrow.

=== Architectural practice ===
Simpson first established his practice in 1813 at his old childhood home at 15 Guestrow. He later moved to premises at 130 Union Street, where in 1826 he lost his entire archive of drawings in a fire which destroyed the building, forcing him to move his office to 8 Belmont Street and later to 22 Crown Street - where the former Post Office building now stands - before later moving to live at 15 Bon Accord Street and practicing from his office at 1 Bon Accord Street.

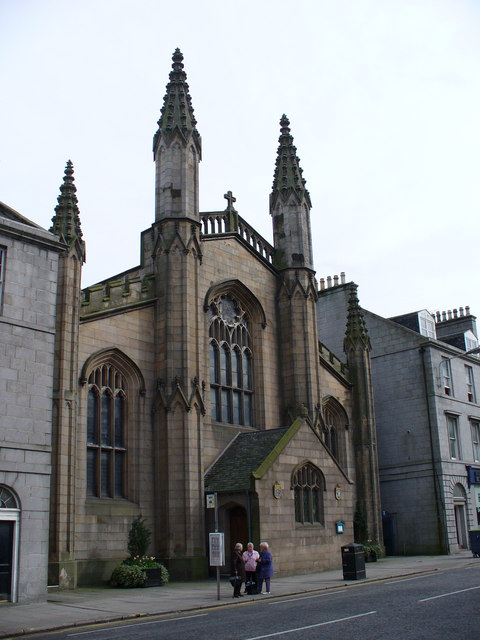
St Andrew's Chapel, now St Andrew's Cathedral, Aberdeen (1817)

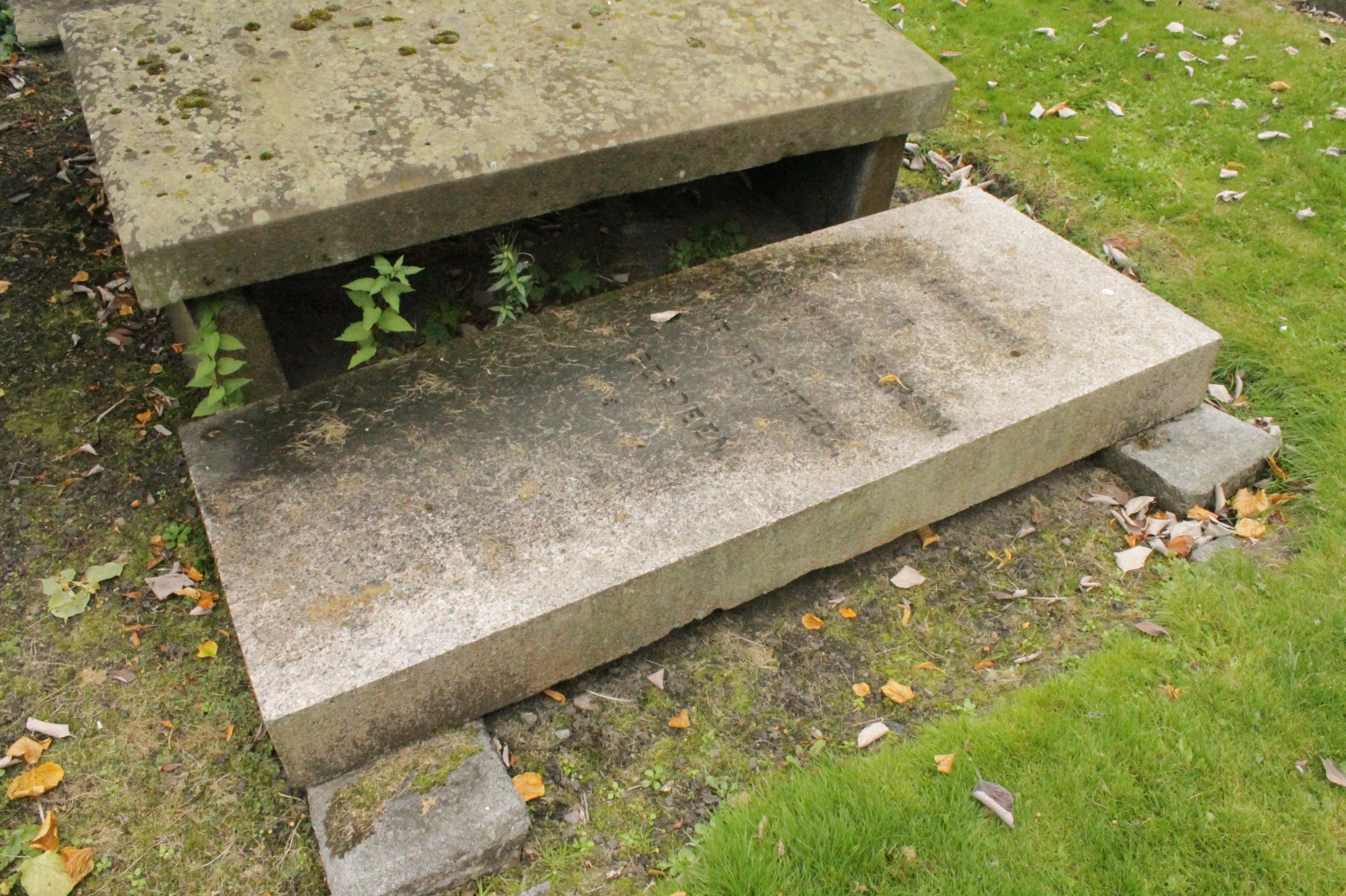
The grave of Archibald Simpson, Kirk of St Nicholas, Aberdeen

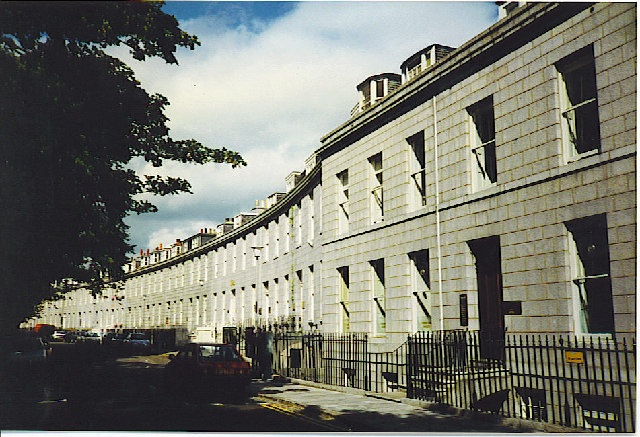
Bon Accord Crescent, Aberdeen (1823) for the Tailor Incorporation

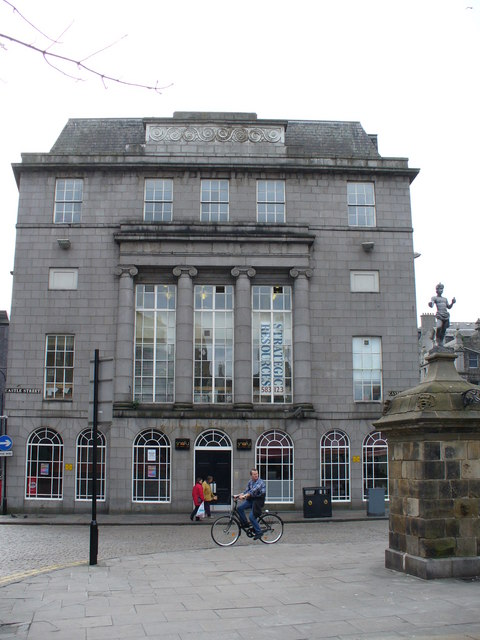
The Athenaeum, Aberdeen (1823)

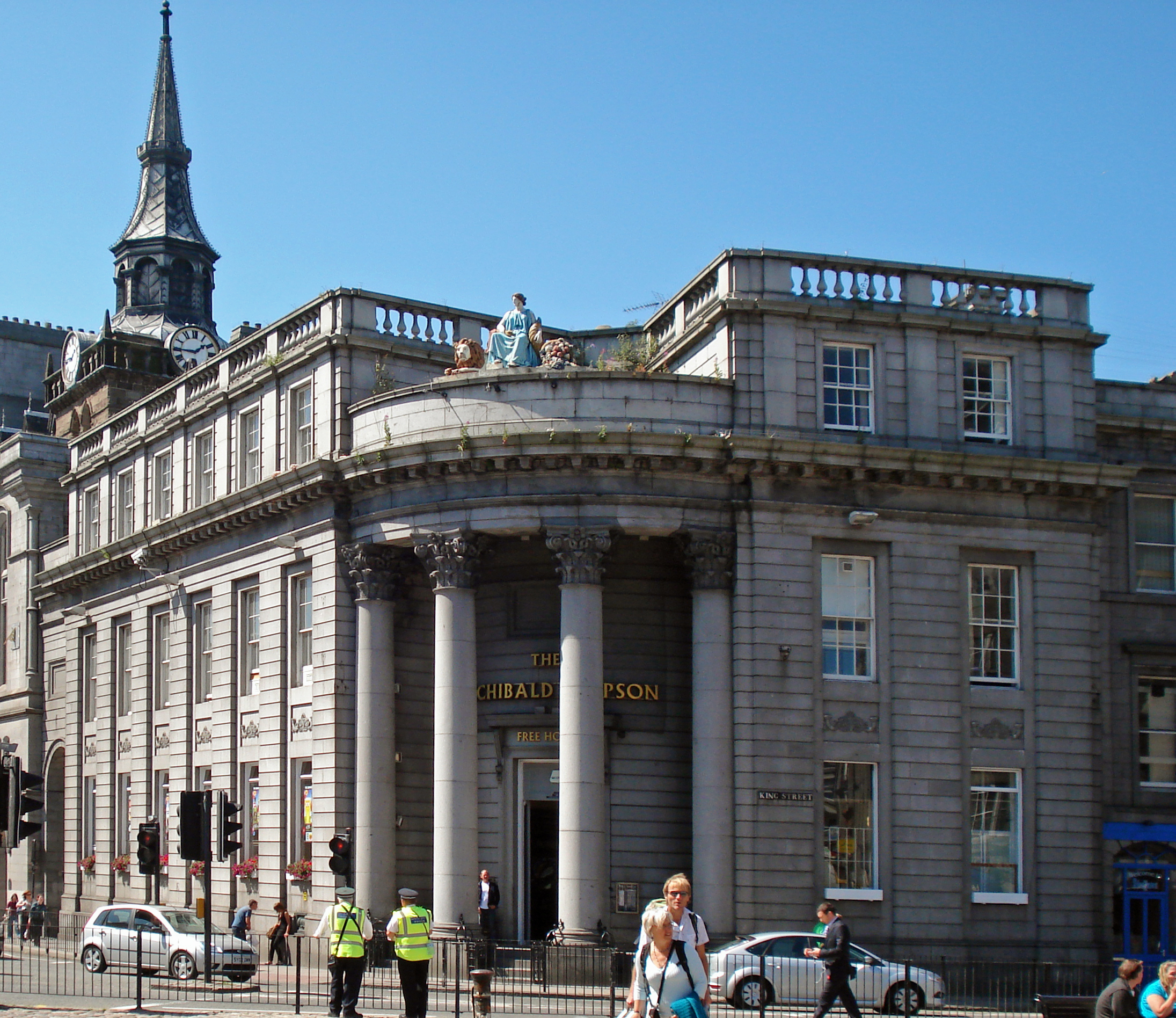
North of Scotland Bank, Aberdeen (1844) with figure of Ceres by James Giles, now a pub called The Archibald Simpson

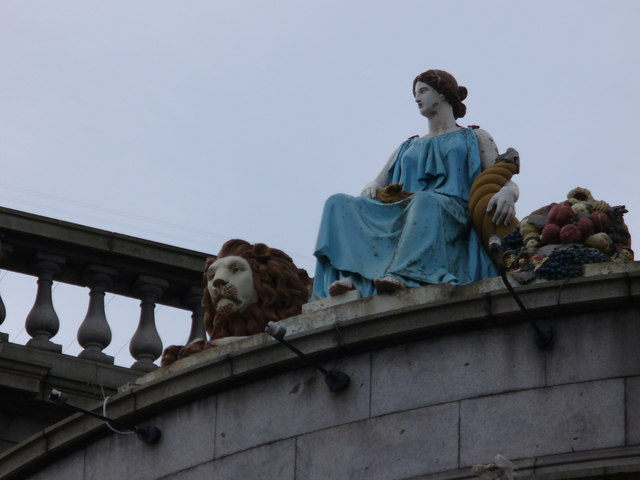
Figure of Ceres by James Giles, North of Scotland Bank, Aberdeen (1844)

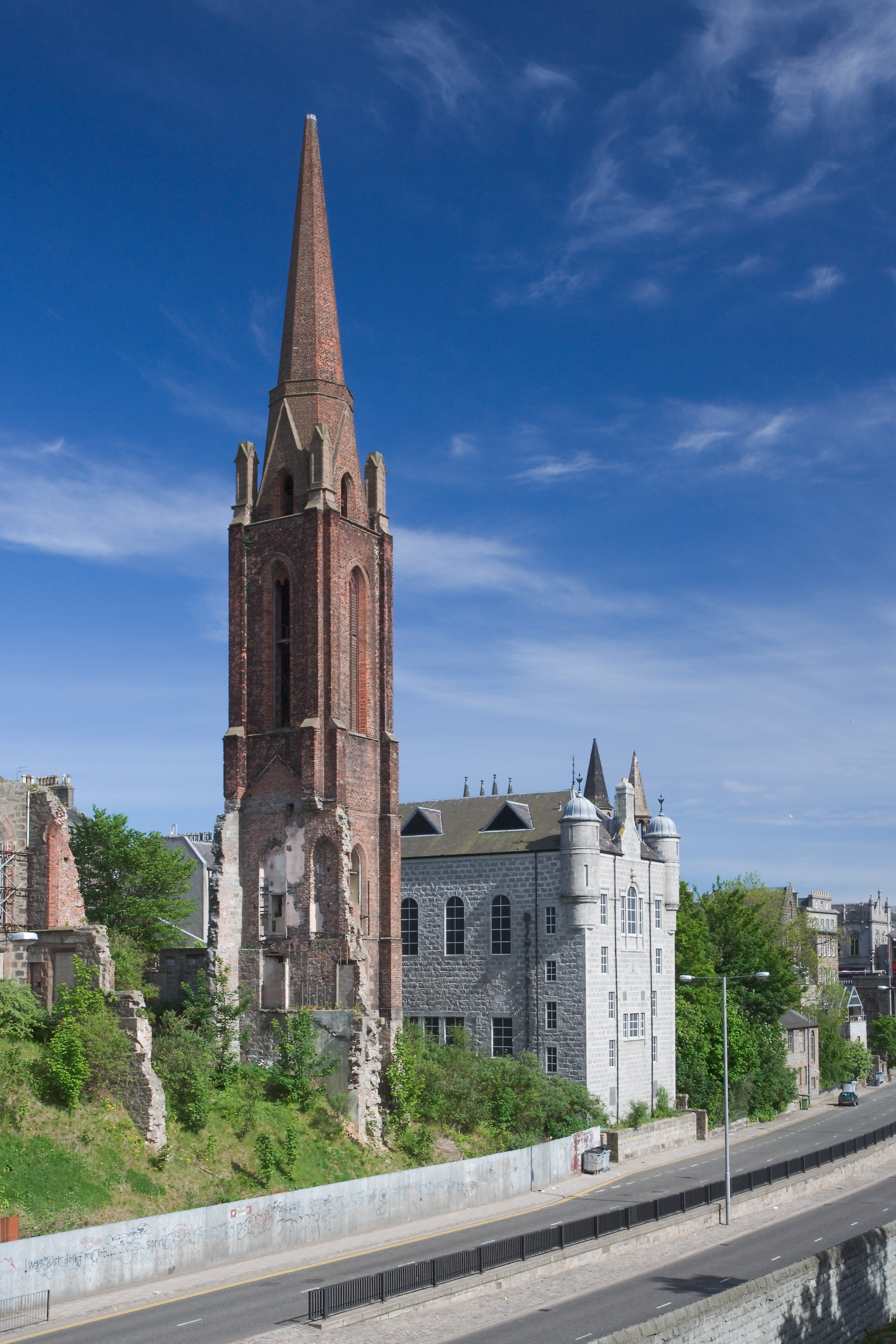
Three Free Churches (1844), built as result of the Disruption of 1843, with evidence of German stylistic influence

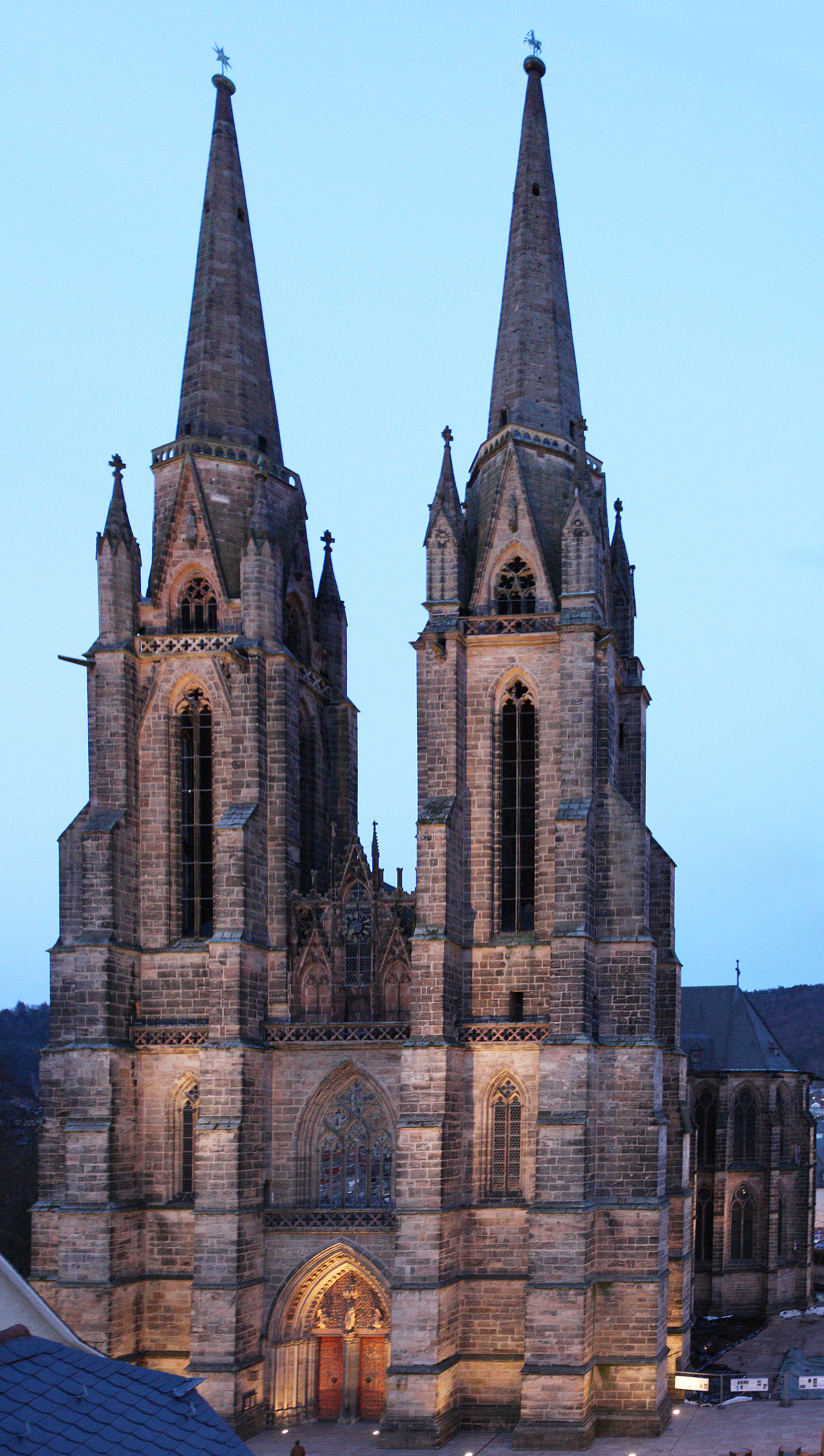
Elisabethkirche, Marburg, Germany (1340)

Simpson began his work at a time when wealthy country landowners were influential in the social and cultural development of the City of Aberdeen, church and institutional expansion was rife and the enterprising Incorporated Trades were looking to invest heavily and speculatively in the new civic development - made possible by the construction of Union Street westwards across the Denburn towards the hinterland in 1801.

Simpson, along with his brother Alexander, was responsible for reviving the Aberdeen Musical Society, founded in 1747, in a move to make influential social contacts which were vital to the success of his architectural practice. Archibald played the violin and his brother Alexander played the flute. He later also founded the Aberdeen Artists Society with his friend and collaborator, the artist James Giles, who also undertook several portraits of Simpson for the University Court.

James Matthews was articled to Simpson in 1834.

=== Architectural style ===
Simpson specialized in the Grecian style, although he also in adopted Gothic, Italian Renaissance, Tudor and Hanseatic architectural styles, depending on the nature of the sight or what a client requested. Together, he and John Smith worked on a granite street architecture that was to influence the quality of development for a further century.

=== Death and legacy ===
Simpson died, aged 56, at his house at 1 East Craibstone Street, Aberdeen on 23 March 1847, having returned ill from a business trip to Derby. He is buried in the graveyard of the Kirk of St Nicholas on Union Street. The grave lies to the south of the church. The Aberdeen Civic Society erected a granite memorial to him in the gardens of Bon Accord Square, as part of the European Architectural Heritage Year in 1975.

The city has a Wetherspoons pub located on the corner connecting Union Street to King Street named in his memory.

== Works ==
Works include:

- 1811 Designs his first building in Aberdeen, Union Chambers, while still in London, for the Duchess of Gordon.
- 1815 Druminnor House (Additions)
- 1815 Castle Forbes
- 1815 Morison of Auchintoul's House, plans prepared while with Robert Lugar
- 1817 St Andrew's Chapel, now St Andrew's Cathedral, Aberdeen
- 1818 Kintore Parish Church and Manse, for his uncle, the Rev. John Shand
- 1819 Forgue Parish Church
- 1819 Lunatic Asylum
- 1820 Medico-Chirurgical Building
- 1820 Assembly Rooms (Music Hall)
- 1822 Gordon Castle Chapel
- 1822 Boath House, Nairnshire
- 1822 Park House
- 1822 Heathcote House
- 1822 Haddo House (Additions), for the Earl of Aberdeen
- 1822 Huntly Lodge (Alterations), for the Duchess of Gordon
- 1823 Athenaeum
- 1823 Bon-Accord Terrace, Square and Crescent, for the Tailor Incorporation
- 1824 Durris House (Additions)
- 1827 Pitlurg House, for General Gordon Cumming, Skene
- 1827 Tillery House
- 1827 Letham Grange, Angus
- 1827 Morkeu House
- 1827 School in Edinburgh
- 1827 Skene House (Additions)
- 1827 Stracathro House, Angus, for Alex Cruickshank
- 1828 St Giles' Church, Elgin
- 1829 Masonic Halls and Assembly Rooms, Forres
- 1830 Woodside Free Church
- 1830 Anderson Institution, Elgin
- 1830 Plan for the development of Ferryhill, for the Shoemaker Incorporation. Part of Marine Terrace executed before he died.
- 1831 Castle Newe (Now Demolished)
- 1831 Plan for the development of the West End (Not executed)
- 1831 Plan for the opening-up of the Guestrow area – centring the spire of St Nicholas with the old entry to Marischal College.
- 1831 Wooden bridge over the Spey at Fochabers, for the Duke of Gordon
- 1832 Craig Castle (Additions)
- 1832 Royal Infirmary
- 1833 St Andrew's Episcopal Church, Banff
- 1835 East Church of St Nicholas (Not the tower)
- 1835 Episcopal Church, Fochabers, for the Duchess of Gordon
- 1835 Murtle House
- 1835 Dr. Bell's School, Frederick Street
- 1836 Drumoak Parish Church
- 1839 Westburn House, Aberdeen
- 1840 Mrs Emslie's Institution (Girl's High School)
- 1840 Crimonmogate House for merchant Patrick Milne
- 1840 Lessendrum House (Destroyed by fire)
- 1840 Meldrum House (Additions)
- 1840 The Gordon Schools, Huntly, for the Duchess of Gordon
- 1840 Glassaugh House
- 1840 Pittodrie House (Additions)
- 1840 28 Albyn Place, Aberdeen
- 1840 Carnoustie House (Demolished)
- 1840 North of Scotland Bank, Huntly
- 1842 New Market and Market Street layout, for the New Market Co. (Demolished)
- 1843 Post Office, Market Street
- 1844 North of Scotland Bank (Head Office), now a pub owned by J D Wetherspoon called the Archibald Simpson
- 1844 Marischal College
- 1844 Three Free Churches (The Triple Kirks)
- 1844 Free Church, Rothesay
- 1844-5 Projected Railway Scheme
- 1845 Lunatic Asylum (Extension)
- 1846 Mechanics Institute
- 1846 Union Bank, Lerwick (His last work?)
- 1846 Big Street Improvement Scheme
