= William Hepburn =

William Hepburn may refer to:

- William Peters Hepburn, American Civil War officer and congressman from Iowa
- William Rickart Hepburn, Scottish politician and soldier
