= List of listed buildings in Lonmay, Aberdeenshire =

This is a list of listed buildings in the parish of Lonmay in Aberdeenshire, Scotland.

== List ==
Name	Location	Date Listed	Grid Ref. (Note: Sometimes known as OSGB36, the grid reference (where provided) is based on the British national grid reference system used by the Ordnance Survey. • "Guide to National Grid". Ordnance Survey. • "Get-a-map". Ordnance Survey.)	Geo-coordinates	Notes	LB Number (Note: Historic Environment Scotland assign a unique alphanumeric identifier to each designated site in Scotland, for listed buildings this always begins with "LB", for example "LB12345".)	Image
Crimonmogate House Sundial				57°37′05″N 1°56′05″W	Category B	13718	Upload Photo
Crimonmogate House Game Larder				57°37′07″N 1°56′06″W	Category C(S)	9240	Upload Photo
Bridge Over Burn Of Logie At S.E. Lodge				57°36′58″N 1°55′52″W	Category C(S)	9253	Upload Photo
Logie Lodges				57°36′30″N 1°56′16″W	Category B	9255	Upload Photo
Kininmonth Church				57°33′50″N 1°59′05″W	Category C(S)	9260	Upload Photo
Craigellie House Walled Garden And Old House Of Craigellie				57°37′58″N 1°57′41″W	Category C(S)	9268	Upload Photo
Crimonmogate House				57°37′06″N 1°56′05″W	Category A	9270	Upload another image
Lonmay, St Columba's Including Lychgate				57°37′49″N 1°56′25″W	Category C(S)	49840	Upload Photo
Lumbs Farmhouse				57°36′31″N 1°57′11″W	Category B	9257	Upload Photo
Cairness House				57°38′17″N 1°56′15″W	Category A	9263	Upload Photo
Cairness House Walled Garden				57°38′06″N 1°56′12″W	Category C(S)	9265	Upload Photo
Pavilions (Old Lonmay House)				57°38′16″N 1°55′28″W	Category C(S)	13717	Upload Photo
Crimonmogate House Monument				57°37′06″N 1°55′54″W	Category B	9241	Upload another image
Crimonmogate House Kennels House				57°36′57″N 1°56′39″W	Category C(S)	9251	Upload Photo
Crimonmogate House S.E. Lodge Near Mill Of Crimonmogate				57°36′57″N 1°55′54″W	Category B	9252	Upload Photo
Cairness, Home Farm, Formerly Barnyards Of Cairness				57°38′28″N 1°56′14″W	Category C(S)	9266	Upload Photo
Craigellie House, West Lodge				57°38′00″N 1°58′18″W	Category C(S)	9269	Upload Photo
Crimonmogate House Stableblock				57°37′06″N 1°56′13″W	Category B	9242	Upload Photo
Crimonmogate House Old Laundry				57°37′05″N 1°56′15″W	Category C(S)	9244	Upload Photo
Crimonmogate House North Lodge				57°37′13″N 1°56′37″W	Category C(S)	9247	Upload Photo
Mill Of Crimonmogate, Former Mill				57°36′55″N 1°55′56″W	Category C(S)	9254	Upload Photo
Windpump, Savock				57°37′02″N 1°54′27″W	Category B	9258	Upload Photo
Cairness House, South Lodges, Gates And Railings				57°37′50″N 1°56′24″W	Category A	9264	Upload Photo
Crimonmogate House Garden Wall And Outhouses S. Of Stableblock				57°37′05″N 1°56′11″W	Category C(S)	9245	Upload Photo
Crimonmogate House Dovecot				57°37′06″N 1°56′23″W	Category B	9246	Upload Photo
Crimonmogate House Main (West) Gate And Gardener's Lodge				57°37′03″N 1°56′52″W	Category B	9248	Upload Photo
Kininmonth House				57°34′02″N 1°56′48″W	Category C(S)	9259	Upload Photo
Craigellie House				57°37′55″N 1°57′41″W	Category C(S)	9267	Upload Photo
Mill Of Crimonmogate Farmhouse				57°36′54″N 1°55′57″W	Category C(S)	6738	Upload Photo
Crimonmogate House Kennels				57°36′57″N 1°56′40″W	Category C(S)	9250	Upload Photo
Parish Church Of Lonmay				57°37′54″N 1°56′15″W	Category B	9261	Upload Photo
Churchyard Of Lonmay				57°38′01″N 1°56′10″W	Category B	9262	Upload Photo
Crimonmogate House Dairy				57°37′08″N 1°56′15″W	Category B	9243	Upload Photo
Crimonmogate House Walled Garden				57°37′00″N 1°56′54″W	Category C(S)	9249	Upload Photo
Logie, Old Coachhouse				57°19′20″N 2°29′24″W	Category B	9256	Upload Photo

== Key ==
The scheme for classifying buildings in Scotland is:

- Category A: "buildings of national or international importance, either architectural or historic; or fine, little-altered examples of some particular period, style or building type."
- Category B: "buildings of regional or more than local importance; or major examples of some particular period, style or building type, which may have been altered."
- Category C: "buildings of local importance; lesser examples of any period, style, or building type, as originally constructed or moderately altered; and simple traditional buildings which group well with other listed buildings."

In March 2016 there were 47,288 listed buildings in Scotland. Of these, 8% were Category A, and 50% were Category B, with the remaining 42% being Category C.

== See also ==
- List of listed buildings in Aberdeenshire
