= Crimonmogate =

Estate in Aberdeenshire, Scotland

Coordinates: 57°37′5.71″N 1°56′5.41″W

Designations

Inventory of Gardens and Designed Landscapes in Scotland
- Official name: Crimonmogate
- Designated: 30 June 2011
- Reference no.: GDL00397

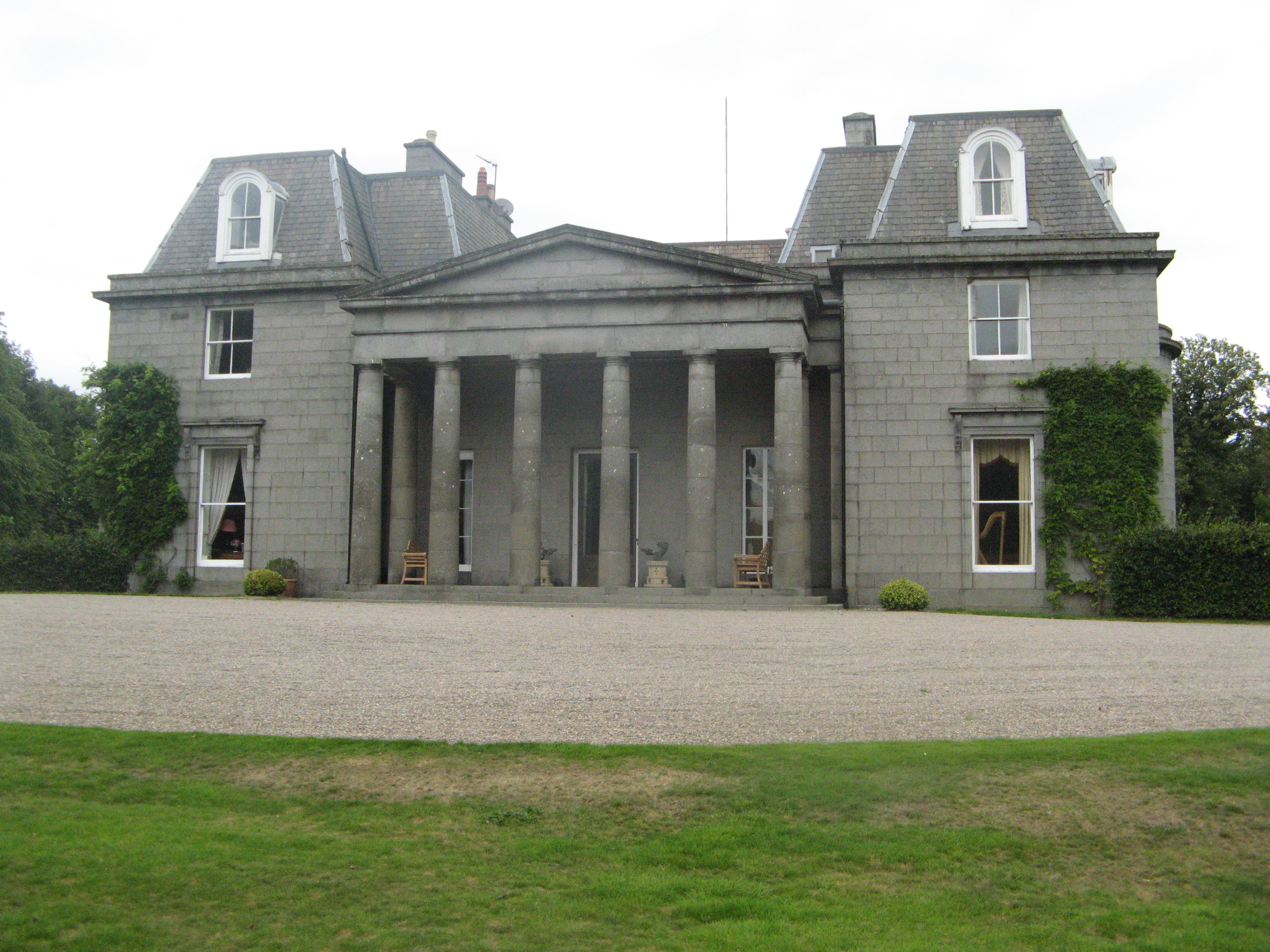
Crimonmogate House, photographed in 2013

Crimonmogate is an estate near Crimond, Aberdeenshire. The estate formed part of Lonmay parish, dates back to the 14th century, and was included in the lands owned by the powerful Earls of Erroll. The estate was sold by Mary Hay, 14th Countess of Erroll, in the 1730s.

Major development commenced when the land was owned by the merchant Patrick Milne in the late 18th and early 19th centuries and the estate is now most famous for Crimonmogate House, designed by the Aberdeen architect Archibald Simpson for Milne. The Greek Revival building is protected as a category A listed building and the grounds are included on the Inventory of Gardens and Designed Landscapes in Scotland.

After Milne's death the estate passed to the Bannerman family, who continued to develop the lands and completed the construction of the mansion, also adding a mansard roof later. Simpson was commissioned to design further structures within the estate. Eventually, through marriage in the 20th century, the estate returned to the Errolls. Almost at the turn of that century, in 1996, the estate was purchased by Christopher Monckton, who began restoration work on the mansion. As a publicity stunt, Monckton falsely claimed in 2000 that he was having to offer it for sale to pay prize money after the Eternity puzzle was solved years sooner than anticipated. In 2001 the estate was bought by a former Chanel model and her husband, Viscount Petersham, who continued the renovation work and use the property as a function and wedding facility although bookings for weddings were discontinued at the end of 2016.

== History ==
=== Early history ===
Crimonmogate means the "road through the cow pasture by the peat moss" and the estate dates back to the 14th century. The road originally referred to is no longer in use but marks the edge of the southern perimeter of the current estate lands. Alternative spellings can be Crimon-Mogat or Crimmond-Moggat. There is a large stone circle on the estate.

Papers of James VI, dated April 1592, show the land ratified in favour of the Laird of Urie, John Hay. In legislation dated April 1689, signed by William II and Mary II, the estate is recorded in the possession of Thomas Gordon. By July 1698 legislative papers of William II list William Hay of Crimonmogate. In October 1700 William II ratified the lands in favour of John Hay, Earl of Erroll and Lord High Constable of Scotland.

The Earls of Erroll were an affluent family and continued to be major Aberdeenshire landowners in the 18th century. Financial constraints in the 1730s could have caused the sale of Crimonmogate to the Abernethy family. This was during the time of Mary Hay, 14th Countess of Erroll who inherited the lands following the death of her unmarried brother, Charles, in 1717. Plans and illustrations produced during the Abernethys' ownership of the Crimonmogate estate around forty years later in 1776 depict a barren landscape devoid of trees with a simple three-storey house. This laird's house with three storeys and three bays was later demolished.

=== 18th century ===
Many new settlements were established in the Buchan area after the middle of the 18th century and this continued into the early 19th century, bringing more wealth to the area. Landowners began to invest profits in the construction of stylish mansions. By this time the estate was owned by the Aberdeen merchant, Alexander Milne. He was a partner in the linen company Gordon, Barron & Co. and the Porthill Company that later became Milne, Cruden, & Company. These companies had extensive factories in Aberdeen and Donside. Milne's son, Patrick (sometimes referred to as Peter), inherited the estate; tax records of 1797–98 show he was levied various taxes on the number of clocks and watches, dogs and male servants he had.

=== 19th century ===
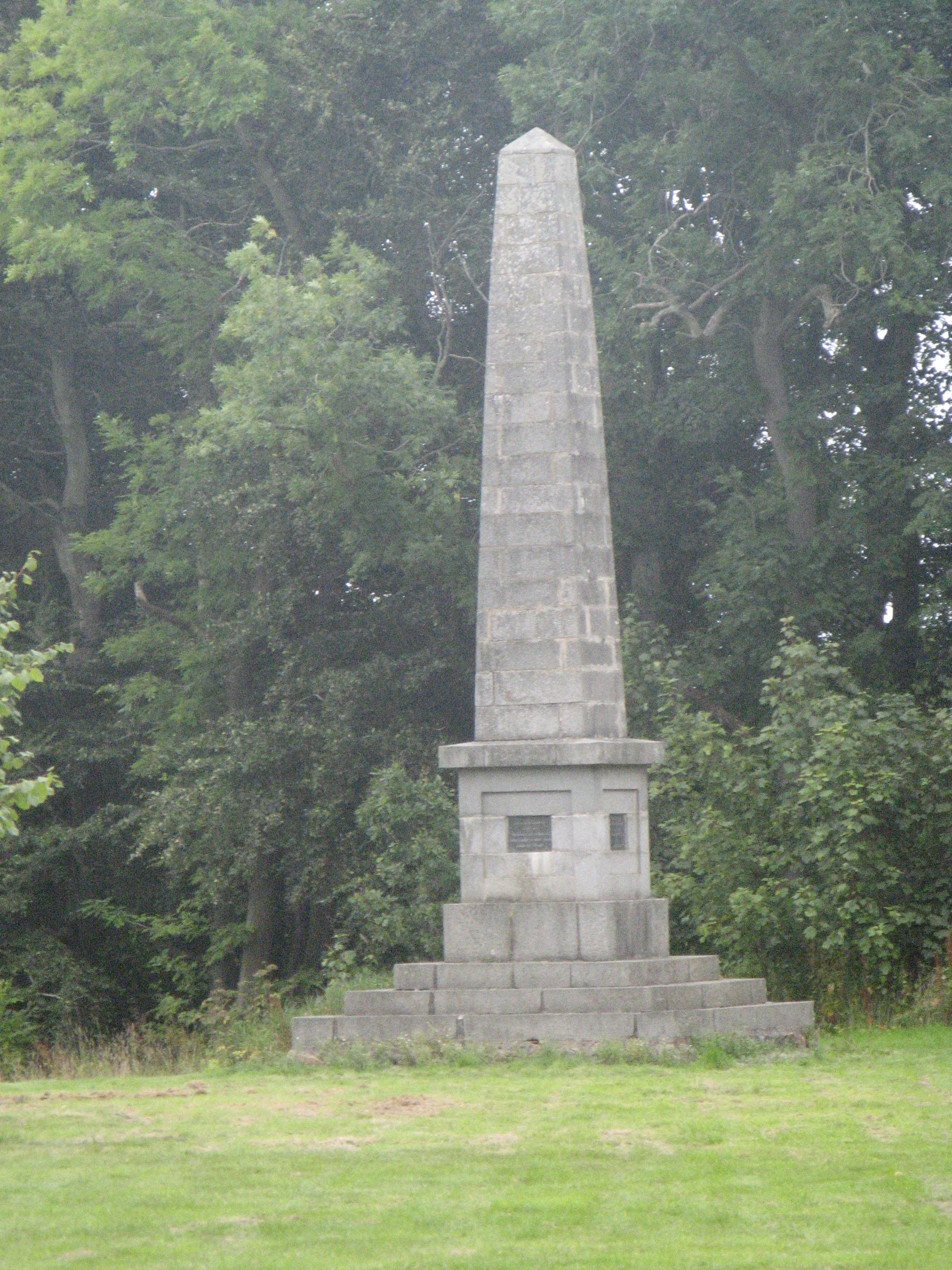
The simple obelisk designed by Simpson to commemorate Milne

Milne had a healthy income from overseas business ventures and he commissioned the Aberdeen architect, John Smith to design a townhouse for him in Union Street, Aberdeen in 1810 that he also called "Crimonmogate". (Note: This property was demolished in 1959) He was involved in "electoral chicanery" in 1807 but successfully stood as a member of parliament representing the Elgin burghs from 30 October 1812 until 11 July 1818.

Another Aberdeen architect, Archibald Simpson, was commissioned by Milne to design a new house as the centre piece of the estate at Crimond. The architecture was in a Neo-Greek style and constructed of ashlar granite. It has two storeys with a single storey centre section. The initial construction was quoted as costing up to £10,000, equivalent to about £818,461 as of 2012. (Note: Calculated using the Bank of England's UK price index.) Although the work was commissioned by Milne, he died at the Crimonmogate House, Union Street, Aberdeen on 16 May 1820 before the house was completed in 1825. Milne died unmarried and without issue, bequeathing all his property to his first cousin once removed, Charles Bannerman, the 8th Bannerman Baronet. Bannerman had a simple granite obelisk erected in memory of Milne in the garden of the estate in 1821.

Bannerman continued the development of the estate, planting trees and cultivating parkland. He continued to use Simpson's services and had several ancillary buildings designed and added. Among these were a game larder built from rubble, an octagonal shaped dairy and laundry, all constructed in 1825. Ten years later in 1835 an eight-sided dovecote, a quadrangular stable block and walled garden were included. Bannerman's son, Alexander (1823–1877) the 9th baronet, progressed with further upgrading and he added a third storey with a mansard roof featuring dormer windows to the mansion around 1860. In the last quarter of the 19th century, he kept a record of the work, both before and after the renovations, in the form of glass negatives. The land around the estate comprised mainly peat moss; some pedigree and half-bred sheep were also grazed in the area.

The 9th baronet's first wife, George Sackville-West, 5th Earl De La Warr's daughter Arabella-Diana, died in 1869 and is buried at Lonmay. He remarried in 1874 to Katherine, the fourth Earl of Ashburnham's daughter. It was through Bannerman's daughter from his first marriage, Ethel Mary Elizabeth's marriage to Charles Carnegie, 10th Earl of Southesk in 1891 that the estate passed to the Carnegie family.

=== 20th century ===
On the Countess of Southesk's death in 1947, she bequeathed the estate to her second son, Alexander Carnegie. The estate was then inherited by Carnegie's son, Raymond who was the second husband of Diana Hay, 23rd Countess of Erroll. She inherited the Erroll title after her father, Josslyn Hay, 22nd Earl of Erroll, was murdered in Kenya. The Countess died suddenly on 16 May 1978 and the estate passed to their son, Jocelyn.

During the Second World War managerial staff of the Fraserburgh based Consolidated Pneumatic Tool Company were resident in the mansion. The company manufactured parts for Spitfire aircraft, Bofors guns and bayonets. Parts of the estate were sold off during the 20th century and there was a gradual decline in the condition of the estate.

In 1996, the estate was bought by Christopher Monckton for £250,000. Monckton and his wife Juliet spent £500,000 restoring the mansion from being "a near uninhabitable wreck". By 2000 the Moncktons employed six staff at the estate: two cooks, a pair of housekeepers and two grounds staff. Various craftsmen were also regularly used. Speaking about the mansion in 1999, Monckton said:

This place was built as somewhere you could entertain princes, bishops and prime ministers, but you would never have known it when we moved in. Basically, the place had been going quietly downhill for 50 years. I bought it from my third cousin at what I would describe as a special price, in view of all the work that needed doing. There were infestations of rats and woodworm, nearly all the windows were rotten, and the roof had so many leaks we needed 12 different buckets to collect the rainwater. Oh, and at the top of the house, there was a 45ft beehive.

In the course of the renovations Monckton had 170 window frames replaced, roof repairs done, corrected the damp issues by installing storage heating and had the infestations eradicated. Restoration work was done on the ballroom floor, which is large enough to entertain 450 guests.

In 2000, Monckton claimed he had to sell the mansion and estate after Eternity, a puzzle he invented, was solved within months rather than the anticipated years and he needed to raise funds to pay a proportion of the £1 million prize money. (Note: The puzzle was launched in June 1999; in spring 2000, two mathematicians believed they had solved it but there was an annual closing date of the end of September for claims. When Eternity II was launched in 2007, Monckton claimed the story of selling Crimonmogate to pay the prize money was a publicity stunt.) In 2007, Monckton admitted this had been a publicity stunt to boost the game's sales before Christmas, and that he had been selling the house for other reasons.

=== 21st century ===
The property was bought by former Chanel Allure perfume model Candida Bond and her husband, William Stanhope, Viscount Petersham and son of Charles Stanhope, 12th Earl of Harrington, shortly after they married in 2001. More renovation work was undertaken and the roof required further repairs as when they purchased the mansion it leaked. The couple have continued to renovate the property and it is used to host functions. It was one of the first places in Aberdeenshire to be licensed for civil ceremonies although bookings for wedding functions were suspended at the end of 2016.

In February 2013, Aberdeenshire Council approved plans to convert some disused estate buildings including the steadings, the Piggery, Creamery and Laundry, to hotel rooms, a spa, a gym and a restaurant.

== Mansion house architecture ==
The Greek Revival mansion is protected as a category A listed building. Built to the designs of Archibald Simpson, the main construction of the present mansion was completed in 1825. Characterised as Simpson's "finest country house" by auctioneers marketing it in 2000, it has 67 rooms.

Constructed with granite from Kemnay, the mansion house has a Greek Doric three-quarter height portico with six columns set to the centre of the south-facing front elevation. The unfluted columns do not feature any entasis; combined with very small capitals, this gives an overall optical illusion of greater size. Three of the seven windows on the east front are centred and bowed. Around 1860 (Note: Historic Scotland and McKean refer to c. 1860; Miller dates the alterations to 1864.) a third storey was added to house more sleeping accommodation. A mansard roof was set on top of the old roof. Charles McKean, an authority on Scottish architectural history, described this extension as "lumpish" and felt it compromised the purity and elegance of the mansion; Miller felt it "introduces an unlooked for, slightly Germanic, flavour to the exterior". At this time a one-storey extension—intended as a dining room that could also be used as a ballroom—was added to the east front with a broad bay window facing looking out to the garden.

Internal features are mainly simple yet distinctive except for the central hall, which is reached through a short foyer. The hall is described by McKean as: "a perfect cube, its proportions emphasised by tall, fluted Corinthian columns which lead up to a magnificent cornice and a coffered ceiling, a glazed dome at the centre." The pilasters are marble painted and frieze are also present. The main staircase and the billiard room are sited behind the hall. The east wing had three rooms: the morning room; the drawing room with a segmental bow; and the dining room. When the ballroom/dining room extension was added in 1860, the former dining room was restyled as a library. The rooms were aligned to form an enfilade. The west wing has a master bedroom suite with a "dressing closet" and a pair of interconnected bedrooms. A business room is included at the front of the wing. A nursery, guest and family bedrooms are accommodated on the first floor; the 1860s mansard extension provided further sleeping accommodation. The basement, which extends below the entire mansion, housed the kitchen and other service rooms.

== Gardens and other structures ==
Several other buildings and structures within the estate are listed as category B and C. Already mentioned are the category C listed single-storey game larder, which has a flat roof and is constructed using rubble; a category B listed octagonal shaped dairy; and laundry, all constructed in 1825. Ten years later in 1835 an eight sided dovecote, a quadrangular stable block and the walled garden were included.

The grounds were included on the Inventory of Gardens and Designed Landscapes in Scotland in 2011 and it categorises the gardens as of high importance in five of the seven criteria it uses; the mansion and other structures are classified as "outstanding". Various garden areas surround the mansion and there is a walled garden to the west and an artificial lake. At the time the estate was listed it was noted a long-term renewal programme was being undertaken.
