= Patrick Milne =

Scottish landowner and politician

- Born: c. 1755
- Died: 16 May 1820 (aged 64–65); Aberdeen
- Other name: Peter Milne
- Occupation: Businessman/Politician

Patrick Milne (c. 1755–16 May 1820) was a Scottish landowner, businessman and politician. He commissioned the design of two houses, both called Crimonmogate, one in central Aberdeen, the other on his estate in Lonmay, Aberdeenshire.

== Ancestry ==
Milne was the eldest son of Alexander Milne of Crimonmogate, an Aberdeen merchant. His mother, Margaret, was the daughter of Patrick Bannerman, Lord Provost of Aberdeen from 1715–1716. His father was a partner in the linen company Gordon, Barron & Co. and the Porthill Company that later became Milne, Cruden, & Company. These companies had extensive factories in Aberdeen and Donside. After the decline of the Porthill linen company, Milne's father bought the Crimonmogate estate in Aberdeenshire, which Milne then inherited.

== Career ==
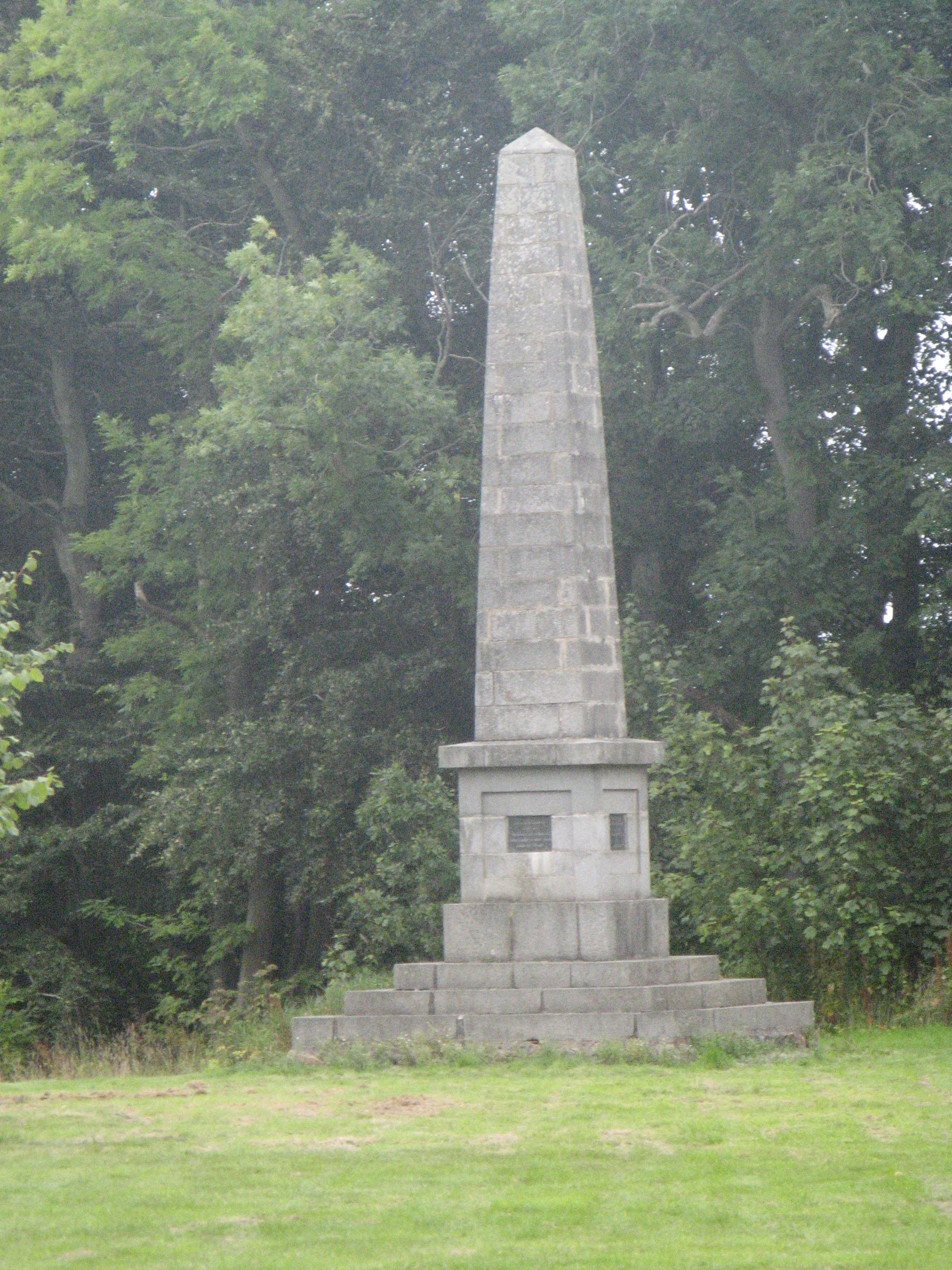
Monument at Crimonmogate House, Lonmay, erected by Charles Bannerman in memory of Milne

Milne had a healthy income from overseas business ventures and tax records of 1797–98 show he was levied various taxes on the number of clocks and watches, dogs and male servants he had.

Several new settlements were established in the Buchan area after the middle of the 18th-century and this continued into the early 19th-century bringing more wealth to the area. Wealthy landowners, like Milne, began to invest profits in the construction of stylish mansions. In 1810, Milne commissioned the Aberdeen city architect John Smith to design a town house for him. This was sited on Union Street, Aberdeen and the house was called Crimonmogate, the same name as his estate in Lonmay. (Note: The Union Street property was demolished in 1959)

Milne was involved in "electoral chicanery" in 1807 when together with Alexander Crombie and William Garden, he bribed councilmen on behalf of his relative, William Keith Falconer, the 6th Lord Kintore, in an attempt to have them vote for the election of Sir Alexander Bannerman. This was unsuccessful and James Rae was appointed as delegate instead. Milne and Crombie continued trying to bribe Rae and confined him in Lord Kintore's residence in the days prior to the election. The attempts were again ineffective as Rae did not change his vote and Archibald Colquhoun was elected instead.

Lord Kintore died just before the elections in 1812 but was believed to support Milne as candidate for the Elgin burghs that year. Milne was duly elected as member of Parliament for Elgin Burghs on 30 October 1812, a position he held until 11 July 1818. He usually supported the Government in votes throughout the 1812 parliament and is recorded as continually being against Catholic relief.

Milne commissioned Archibald Simpson, an Aberdeen architect in similar standing to John Smith, to design a new mansion for his Crimonmogate estate. This was in a Neo-Greek style and constructed of ashlar granite. It has two storeys with a single storey centre section. The initial construction was quoted as costing up to £10,000. Although the work had been commissioned by Milne, he died in 1820 before the house was completed in 1825. It is a category A listed building.

== Legacy ==
Milne was unmarried and without issue. He died at his Crimonmogate House, Union Street, Aberdeen on 16 May 1820 aged 65 years. He bequeathed his property to Charles Bannerman, his first cousin once removed. Bannerman had an obelisk monument erected in Milne's memory in the garden at Crimonmogate in 1821, which was given a category B listing by Historic Scotland.

== Notes ==
Parliament of the United Kingdom
Preceded by Archibald Campbell	Member of Parliament for Elgin Burghs; 1812–1818	Succeeded by Robert Grant
