= John Smith (architect) =

Scottish architect (1781–1852)

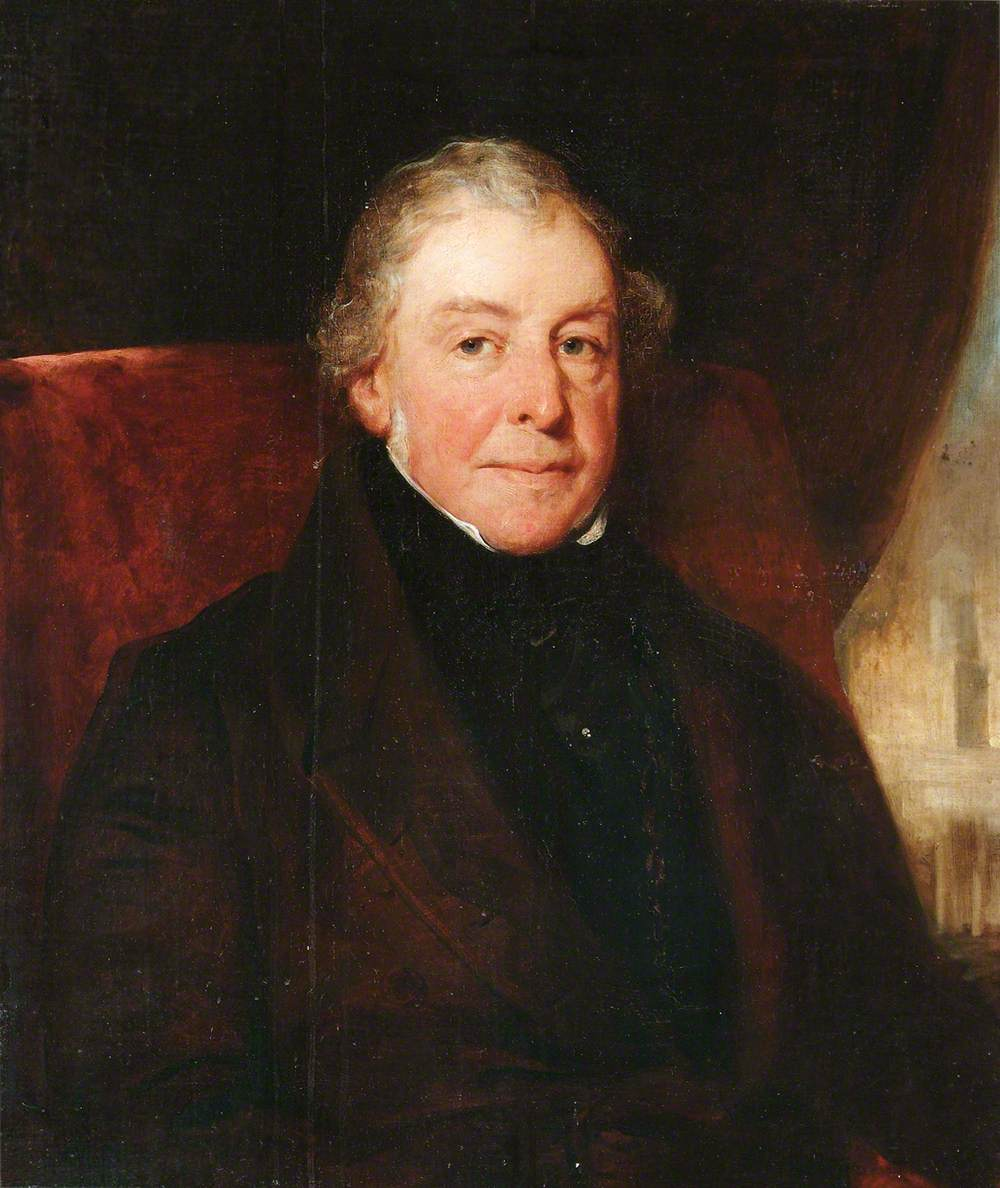
- Portrait of John Smith by John Phillip
- Born: 1781; Aberdeen, Scotland
- Died: 22 July 1852 (aged 70–71)
- Occupation: Architect

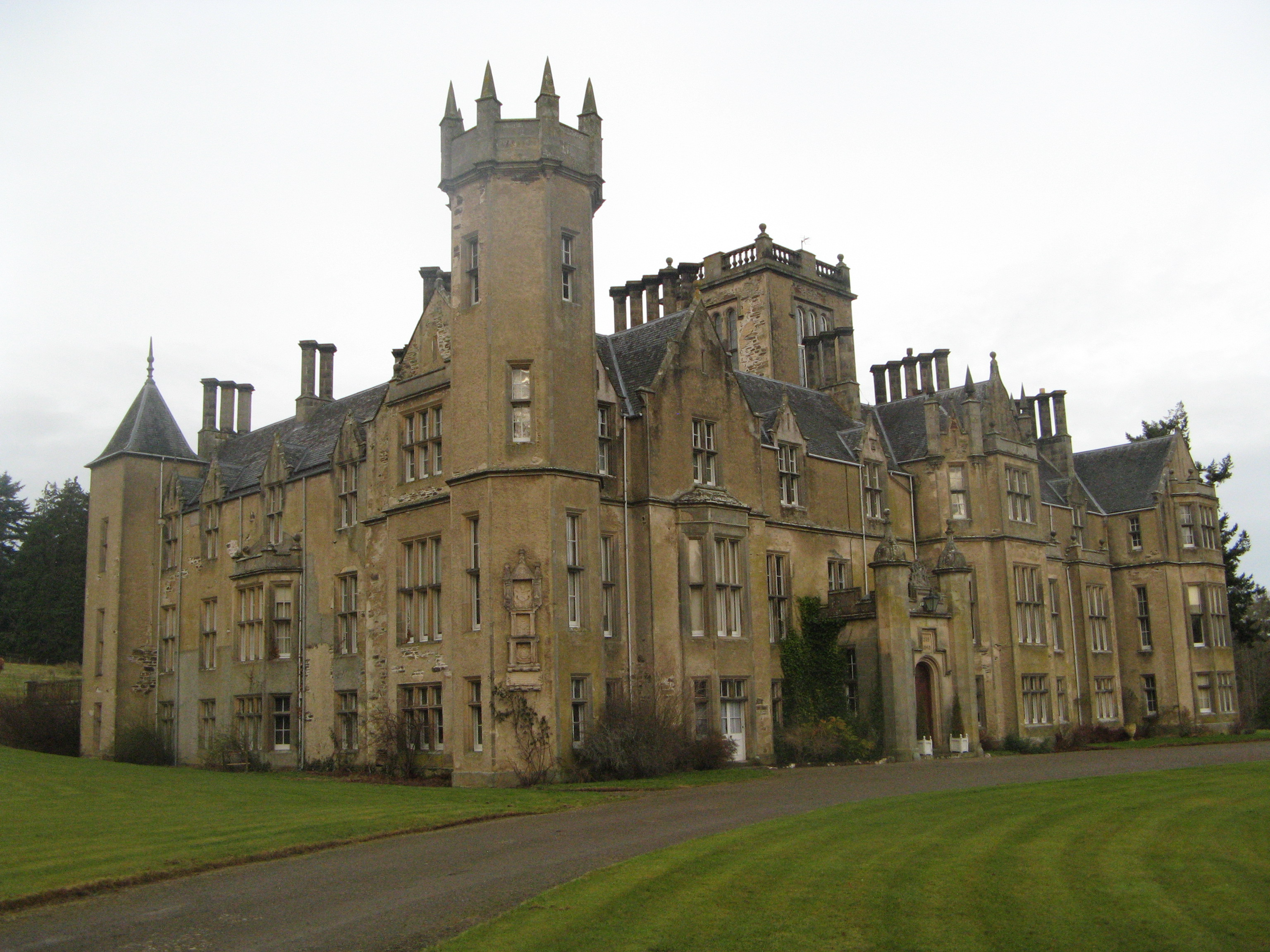
Forglen House, near Turriff, is an example of an 1839 country mansion designed by Smith

John Smith (1781 – 22 July 1852) was a Scottish architect. His career started in 1805 and he was appointed as the official city architect of Aberdeen in 1807, the first person to hold this post. Together with Archibald Simpson, he contributed significantly to the architecture of Aberdeen, and many of the granite buildings that gave the city the nickname "The Granite City" or also "The Silver City" are attributed to them.

Smith was the son of a successful builder and architect and his own son, William, continued the family tradition by also becoming an architect. After completing his training in London, Smith quickly became established throughout the north-east of Scotland. He secured private commissions to design, renovate or alter numerous country houses, parish churches and castles; his official capacity as city architect ensured he is also credited with several extensive public works. Towards the middle of his career, around the 1830s, as his individuality developed, he gained the nickname of "Tudor Johnny", an indication that his designs were starting to favour a Tudor Gothic styling.

== Ancestry and early life ==
Smith was born in Aberdeen in 1781. His father was William "Sink-em'" Smith (d. 1815 (Note: The Dictionary of Scottish Architects gives a death date of 1812 but Miller states 1815.)), also a successful builder and architect. The younger Smith attended Aberdeen Grammar School before serving an apprenticeship as a stonemason in his father's building firm. He undertook further architectural design training in London, possibly under the tutelage of James Playfair, but as Playfair died in 1794, the offices of Robert Lugar seem more likely. By the end of 1804, Smith returned to Aberdeen, where construction and development were rapidly evolving.

== Career ==
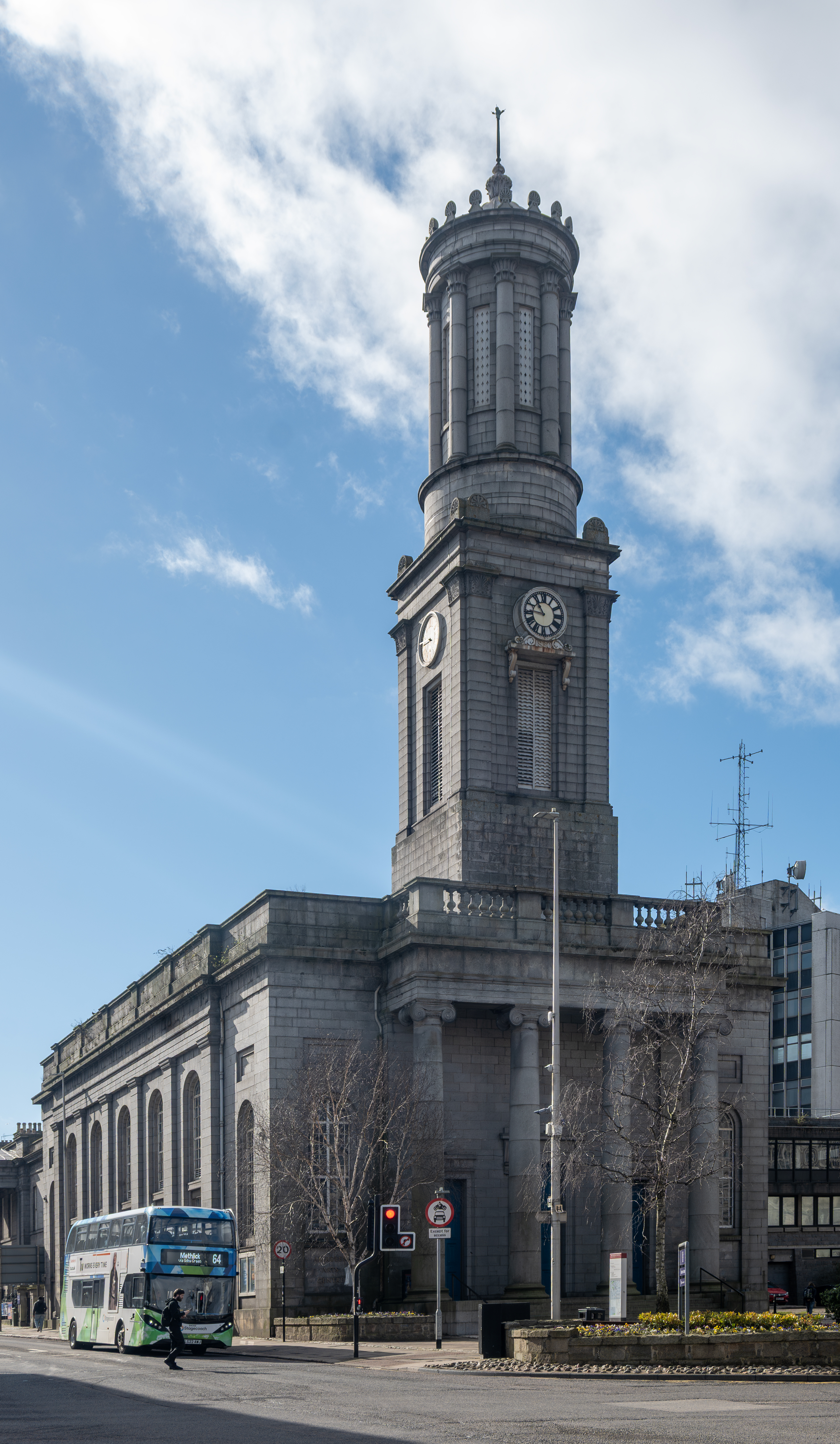
33 King Street, now Aberdeen Arts Centre, formerly the North Church

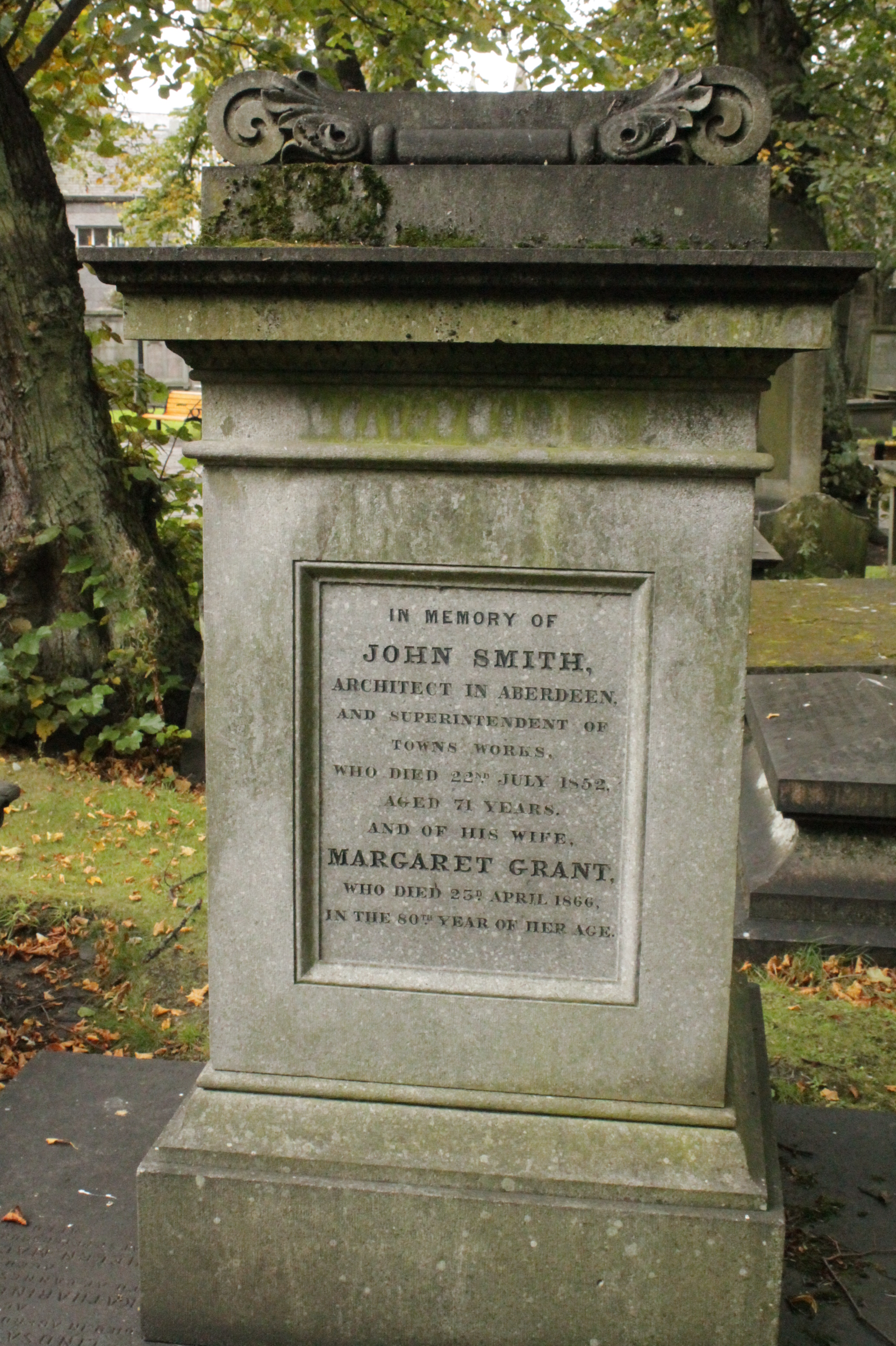
The grave of John Smith, architect, Kirk of St Nicholas, Aberdeen

One of Smith's first major commissions was to design a town house for the merchant Patrick Milne in 1805. (Note: There is variation as to the exact year as sources give years varying between 1805 through to 1810.) Sited on Union Street, Aberdeen, Crimonmogate was a two-storey "Greek inspired country house" with a five windowed frontage. (Note: Crimonmogate House was the Royal Northern Club from 1874 to 1955; it was demolished between 1959 and 1963 (again there are discrepancies in the sources as to the exact year).) He is next credited with the design of Footdee, an area within Aberdeen. Consisting of 56 but and ben one storey thatched houses arranged in two squares, the plans quickly received council approval and construction was completed by 1809. The new housing accommodated residents formerly living in condemned properties beside the harbour; the re-location of these tenants allowed the council to begin initial proceedings for Thomas Telford's 1824 Aberdeen Harbour improvements, with which Smith was also associated.

Smith was appointed as the official architect for Aberdeen in 1807. He is credited with compiling the first map showing a correct outline of Aberdeen city in 1810 indicating present and planned improvements.

Archibald Simpson returned to Aberdeen in 1813, establishing a business competing with Smith. Both firms were successful despite uncertainties due to the War of 1812 and their careers were described by Miller as "destined to run remarkably parallel". Although at times rivals, they often collaborated and their buildings became the nucleus of establishing the style of the heart of the Aberdeen city centre. (Note: The note in the Historic Environment Scotland list reads: "John Smith was the city architect of Aberdeen and along with Archibald Simpson, was largely responsible for the classicizing of Aberdeen city centre.") As the buildings were constructed from silver granite, the city gained the name of the Silver City or alternatively the Granite City.

Smith became known as "Tudor Johnny" as his later designs around the 1830s, particularly for mansions and churches, incorporated a Tudor-Gothic form. However, his civic designs in Aberdeen city remained in a neo-classical style.

Miller designates Smith's design for the North Church in Aberdeen as "generally considered to be his greatest building" and further states, "Undisputedly by far the finest neoclassical church in the City of Aberdeen." Sited on the corner of Queen Street and King Street the design gained approval from the town council in September 1828. The church opened in June 1831 but it was years later before sufficient funding was available to install clocks. A Greek Revival style was used in the construction of the 120 feet (37 m) by 62 feet (19 m) rectangular building with a circular pepper pot tower set upon a two-stage box tower. It was the tallest building in Aberdeen until its height was surpassed by the spire of the Triple Kirk designed by Simpson. Suitable to seat 1,600 at services, congregation numbers declined and the church closed in 1954. It has been used as the Aberdeen Arts Centre from the early 1960s.

One of the last designs before his death was for Balmoral Castle. He initially did some work re-building the tower for Robert Gordon, 5th son of the 3rd Earl of Aberdeen, who was leasing Balmoral in 1830. Subsequently, he was involved with drawing up the initial plans for the new castle, by this time owned by Queen Victoria and Price Albert after meeting Price Albert on Friday 11 September 1848. After Smith died in 1852 the final designs and work were undertaken by his son William.

He is buried with his wife, Margaret Grant, in the churchyard of the Kirk of St Nicholas on Union Street in Aberdeen.

== Works ==
With a career spanning the years from 1805 until his death in 1852, the list of works Smith was associated with, both in his official capacity as City Architect and private commissions, is lengthy; some examples are given below.

=== Bridges ===
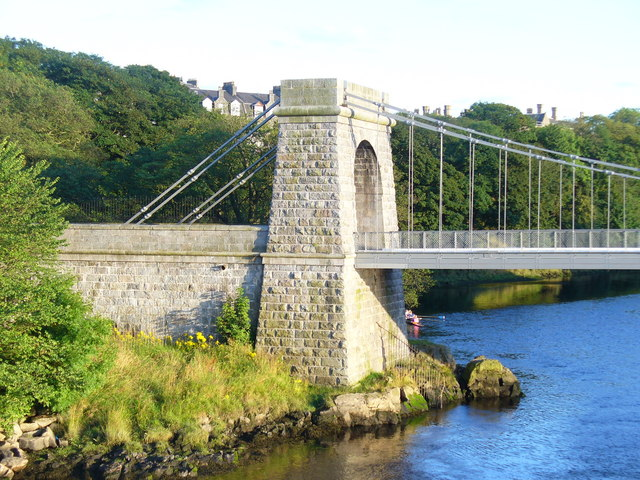
Torry side of Wellington Suspension Bridge

Captain Samuel Brown designed the Wellington Suspension Bridge, which spanned the River Dee in Aberdeen at Craiglug; Smith competed against Simpson to win the contract to design the structures architectural sections. The bridge opened in May 1831 and featured arched granite pylons. Smith's contract also included building three miles of approach road and he designed/built the toll house at the north-east end of the bridge.

Smith's design for the widening of the historic medieval Bridge of Dee in 1841 was described by Paxton and Shipway as "an exemplary widening of a historic bridge".

In 1837, Smith designed the St Devenick's Bridge. It was also known as Morrison's Bridge after Reverend George Morrison who commissioned its design and paid for the construction; another name was the Shakkin' Briggie because it would shake whenever anyone walked over it. The bridge was 305 feet (93 m) long with a span of 185 feet (56 m) and followed the same style as the Wellington Suspension Bridge.

=== Castles ===
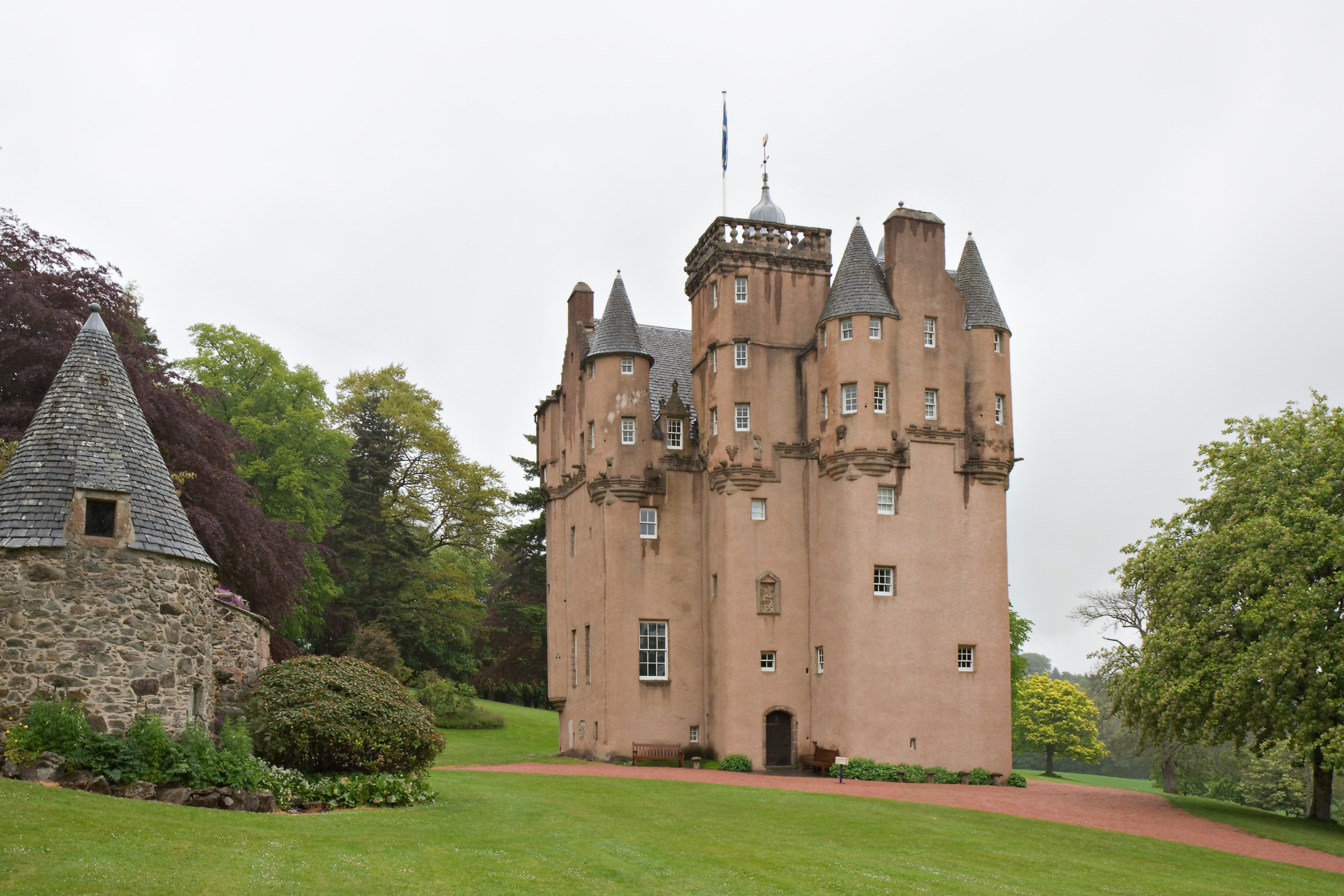
Smith felt Craigievar Castle was: "one of the finest specimens in the Country of the age and style in which it was built."

In 1814–1815 Smith was commissioned to design modifications to Brucklay Castle including remodelling the main entrance hall and frontage; this was in the neoclassical style. Work was also undertaken on the second and third storeys of the north elevation. Returning in 1820, Smith extended the old stable block in a mainly one and a half-storey Gothic style with a central pyramid roofed two-storey tower. That year he also began work on an extensive enlargement of Cluny Castle for Colonel John Gordon. Originally a Z-plan castle built c. 1604, the later extensions were described by architectural historian H. Gordon Slade as "the most shocking mis-use of architectural effort and granite in the north east of Scotland." Smith also worked on nearby Castle Fraser constructing an access stairway between the great hall on the first floor and the rear courtyard entrance. The two-storey building it was housed within had a glazed cupola at its centre under a lead roof. Two crow stepped gatehouses were constructed between an arched gateway entrance and various access passages joined the first floor wings. He was also responsible for the library design.

Roof repairs carried out at Craigievar Castle were essential in the 1820s as the structure had fallen into decay. The owner, Sir John Forbes, had considered demolishing the tower but Smith advised against it stating it was: "one of the finest specimens in the Country of the age and style in which it was built." The work lasted two years and involved the re-construction of almost all of the top floor. The windows, external harling and pointing were replaced and it is likely Smith also designed the gardener's cottage.

Although Drumtochty Castle was built to the designs of James Gillespie Graham with further extensions c. 1815, the actual work of the extensions was undertaken by Smith. Miller speculates Gillespie Graham could have had a dispute with the owner, George Drummond, but considers Smith's closer proximity to the site is a more plausible scenario.

Around 1830 he oversaw the building of Fintray House near Aberdeen for the Sempill family, to a design by William Burn. The house was demolished in 1953.

The rugged cliff tops to the north of Cruden Bay were the setting for Slains Castle where, in 1836, Smith was engaged by William Hay, 18th Earl of Erroll and Lord Lieutenant of Aberdeenshire to renovate his existing courtyard house into a stylish residence suitable for a person of his standing. Smith's design enveloped the previous building, encasing it in a new structure of pink Peterhead granite and featured round towers.

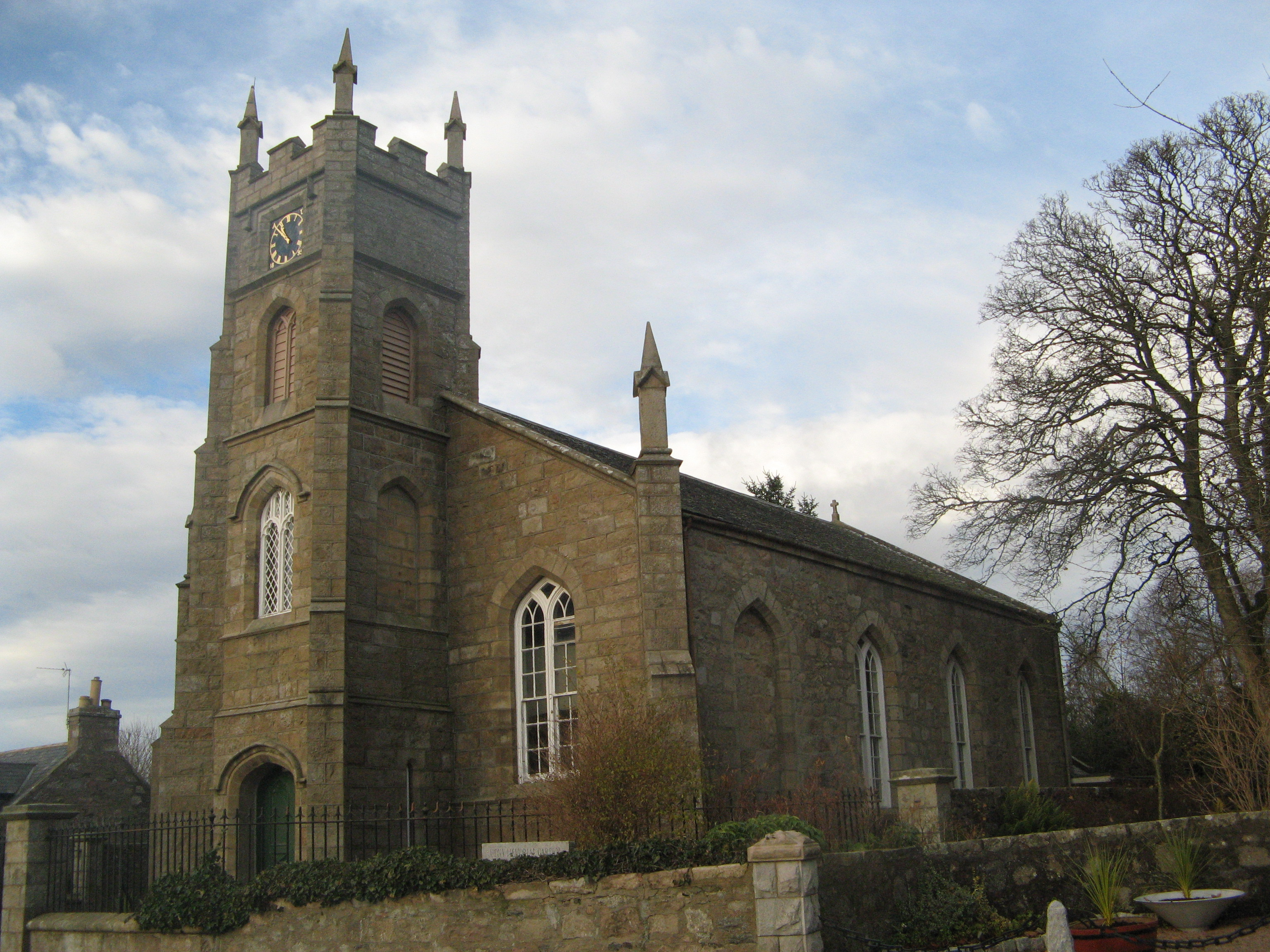
Udny Parish Church

=== Churches ===
The construction, restoration, renovation or alteration to several parish churches throughout Aberdeenshire, Angus and Kincardineshire are credited to Smith. One of his first rural church designs was at Fintray, Aberdeenshire in 1821; later that year he also designed Udny Parish Church. These formed the basis of designs that Smith would evolve and develop in future years for other parish churches. Udny Parish Church was the first of Smith's Tudor-Gothic ecclesiastic designs. A box tower above the main entrance features a crenellated top with louvred pointed panels, belfry and clock incorporated in the front (south) gable with walls of rough granite. The main church is a basic rectangle with a slated roof.

The north aisle of St Machar's Cathedral was restored to Smith's designs in 1832 and the entrance lodges and gateway were re-built. A new session house was also added. He also undertook work at Skene Parish Church in 1840 and constructed the parish church in Longside in 1835.

=== Country houses ===
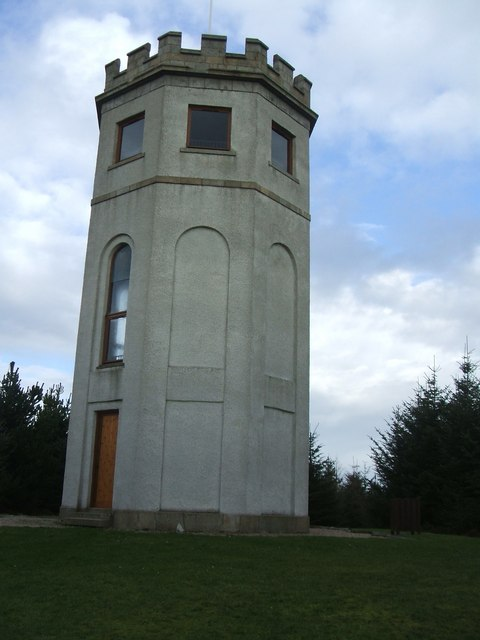
The Observatory at Drinnie's Wood on the Pitfour estate was designed by Smith

Smith undertook considerable work for the Fergusons at their Pitfour estate in Aberdeenshire. Starting in 1809, the third laird of Pitfour, James Ferguson commissioned him to design a new house. This was a three-storey house, 98 feet (30 m) square by33 feet (10 m) high, with 365 windows. There were Greek pediments included on top of the side elevations, stone margins set into the rendered walls and it conveyed an impression of northern Italy. Over the following years, Smith designed several other structures within the policies (Note: the definition of policies as used in Scots land terminology given in the OED is: "The enclosed (and often ornamental) grounds, park, or demesne land surrounding a large country house.") at Pitfour. These included: the horseshoe-shape, neo-classical two-storey riding stables to the rear of the mansion during the time of the fifth laird in 1820; gatehouses and bridges; a small replica six-bay Greek Doric temple, styled after the Temple of Theseus; and the Observatory, an eight-sided crenellated three-storey tower.

Among other country houses featuring Smith's designs was the Neo-Greek style Dunecht House in 1820. Comprising two storeys and a full basement, it was constructed from granite. A low parapet hid the slate, low pitched roof. The original Smith designed house was later extensively expanded by William, his son. Work was undertaken at Haddo House on the kitchens and peripheral buildings in 1843. He returned there in 1845 and built the gate houses at the North and South entrances. Constructed in a rough coarse granite, these single-storey buildings are in a Tudor style. Sometime before 1830 William Rickart Hepburn commissioned Smith to design Rickarton House in Kincardineshire. Forglen House near Turriff was designed by Smith for Sir Robert Abercromby. The new mansion house was described by architectural historian Charles McKean as an "Elizabethan Gothic confection".

=== Other works ===
The re-construction of the front of King's College, Aberdeen was undertaken by Smith in 1825. The work incorporated other renovations as the building had fallen into a ruinous condition. Designs were drawn up for the section named Cromwell's Tower and its original six storeys were replaced with four modern levels and included a ground floor flat for the housekeeper with classrooms above. Predominantly in a Tudor style, some of the extensive designs were not enacted; however, eventually the joining of the Chapel, Cromwell's Tower and the old Crown Tower was achieved. The work was one of Smith's earlier Tudor-Gothic designs.

Smith completed a contract started by William Burn to the back and west boundary walls of Robert Gordon's College with extra wings and other alterations continued from 1830 until 1833. During the same years (1830–1833) the "Ionic Screen" at the front of Kirk of St Nicholas on Union Street, Aberdeen was installed. Featuring a triumphal arch with paired Ionic columns set to each side, the columns were originally supposed to be of cast iron.

== Death and legacy ==
Smith married Margaret Grant in 1807 in Aberdeen. She died in 1866, aged 79 years. Her death certificate records her not as a daughter of George Grant of Auchterblair, as is popularly stated, but of Lieutenant Francis Grant of the 55th Regiment of Foot and his wife Elizabeth McGregor, who were married in 1781. William Smith, Margaret’s son, was the informant of her death.

Most of John Smith’s eight children died at an early age but their fourth child, William, joined his father in business and also became city architect in Aberdeen. The couple also had a daughter, Margaret Grant Smith.

Having suffered a lengthy, painful illness, Smith died in 1852 at the home he inherited from his wife's father. There is a plaque to commemorate him sited at the Kirk of St Nicholas in Union Street, Aberdeen.

=== Gallery ===
John Smith's works include

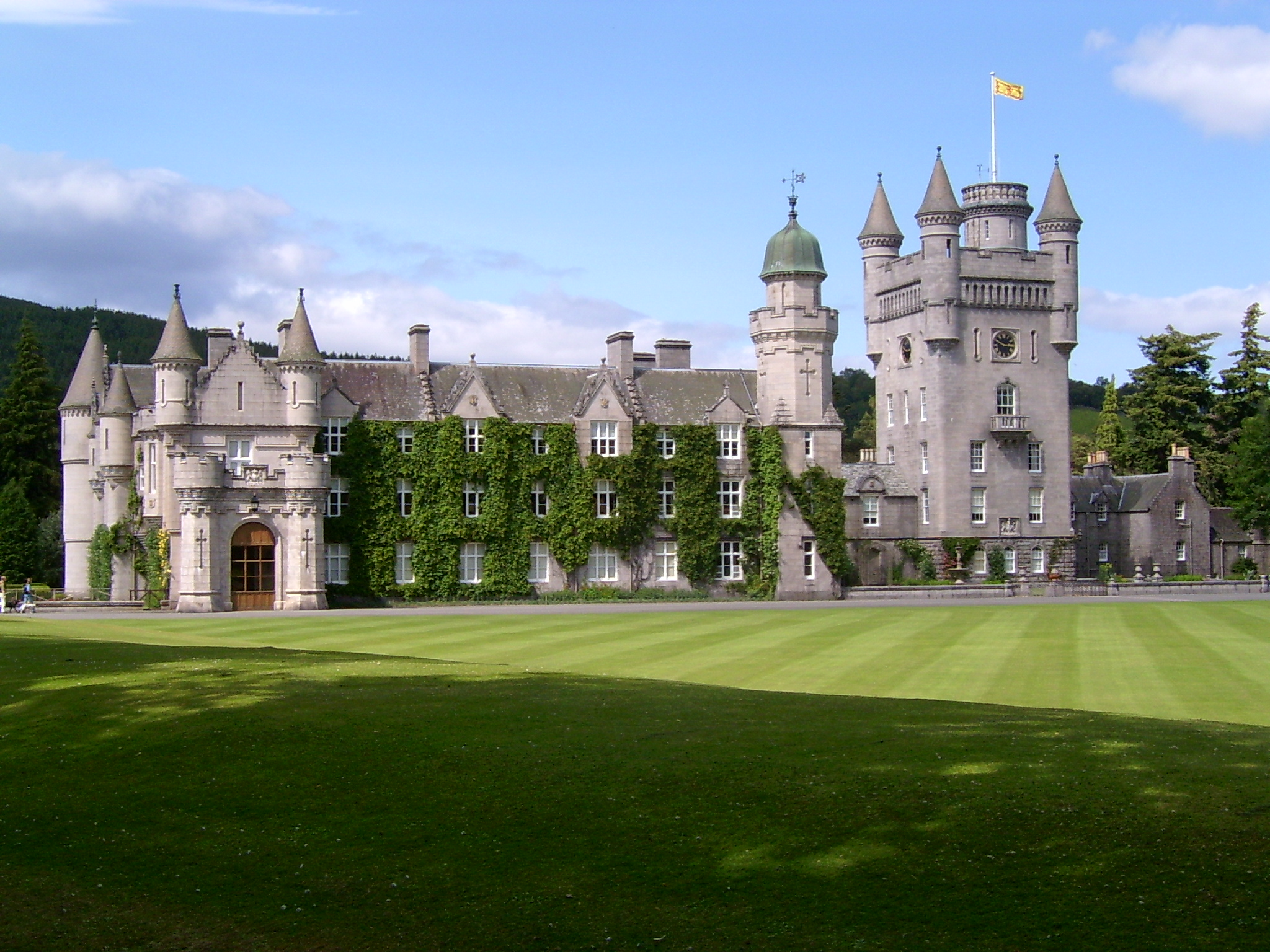
Balmoral Castle

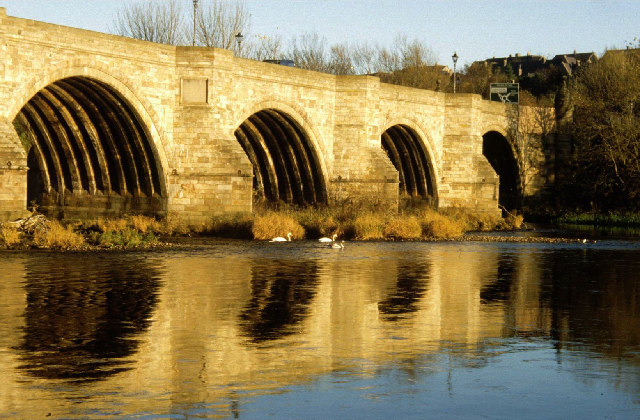
Bridge of Dee

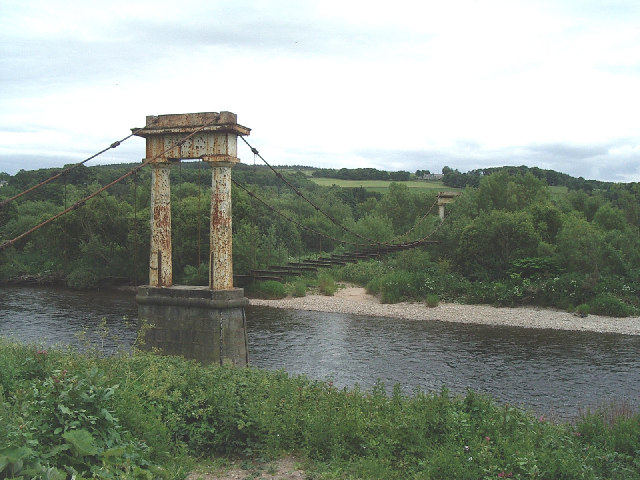
Shakkin' Briggie

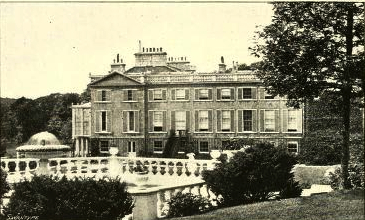
Pitfour House

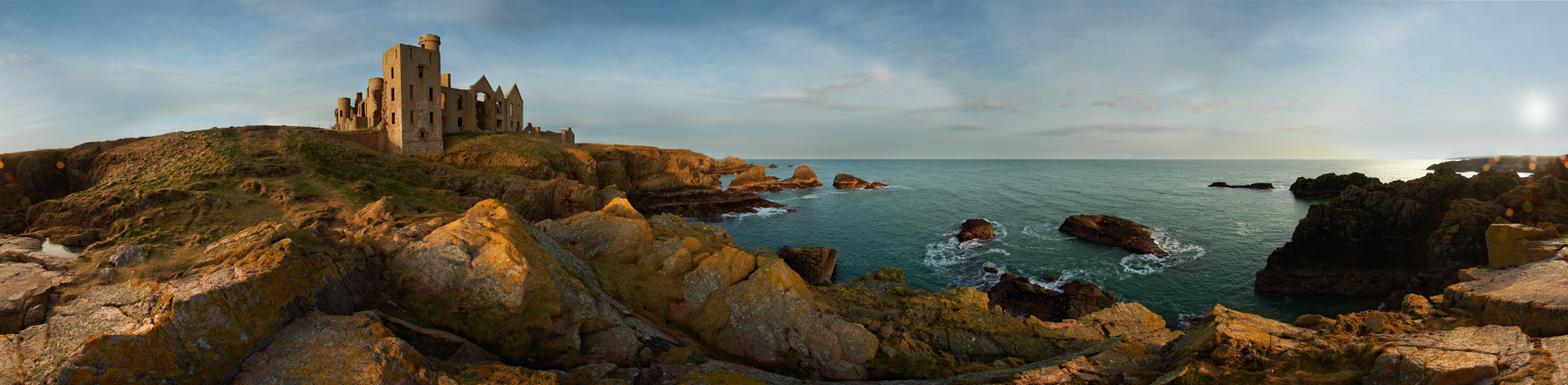
Slains Castle
