= Udny Parish Church =

Church in Aberdeenshire, Scotland

Coordinates: 57.328224°N 2.200702°W

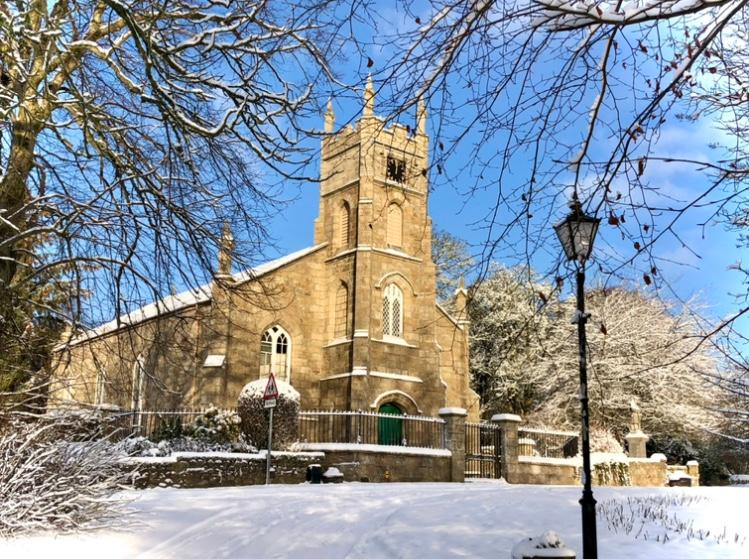
Udny Parish Church

Udny Parish Church was formerly a church of a congregation of the Church of Scotland at Udny Green, Aberdeenshire in the north-east of Scotland, approximately 15 miles (24 km) north of Aberdeen.

Sited on the north edge of the village green, it is within the ancient Udny Parish and the Formartine committee area. It is a Category B listed building.

== History ==
Previously known as Christ's Kirk, it was designed by the Aberdeen city architect John Smith in 1821.

In 1890 Alexander Marshall Mackenzie undertook internal restoration work and the roof was replaced. Harrison & Harrison made the pipe organ, which is positioned to the rear of the pulpit. It is of the manual action type. Stained glass panels were placed in the existing three mullioned windows on the north gable in 1927.

As there is no burial ground attached to the church, burials took place at the nearby Old Churchyard instead.

The closed church was sold by the Church of Scotland in 2023.

== Architecture ==
Constructed from granite in 1821 to the plans of the Aberdeen city architect, John Smith, this was the first of his ecclesiastical designs to utilise a Tudor-Gothic style. The southern elevation has a four-stage tower featuring an arched entrance with a hood mould and a curved window above. The tower protrudes from the main rectangular body of the church, which forms symmetrical gables to either side and features elongated arched windows. A broad slated roof tops the main part of the structure and it has pinnacles on the four outside corners. Similar spires are in each corner of the tower above a crenellated parapet.

A clock face is set at the top of the south-facing side of the tower. It bears a dated stone, 1895, but it is uncertain whether this date applies to the clock itself or if the final stage of the tower was added in that year. The inscribed bell was made by Thomas Mears II.

The single-storey harled session house and vestry are sited on the opposite side at the rear elevation of the church. Four plain-glass windows are installed on the west and east elevations. Access is also available on the east side through a side door.

The white-painted inside, with a ceiling of wooden arched beams, has upper seating around three sides, and a raised pulpit.

== See also ==
- Udny Mort House
