= Rickarton House =

House in Aberdeenshire, Scotland

Coordinates: 56.9884°N 2.2677°W

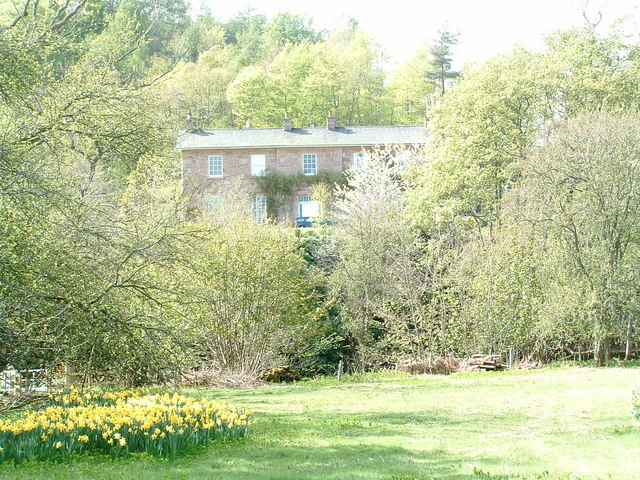
Rickarton House

Rickarton House is a 19th-century country house in Kincardineshire, Scotland. It lies approximately three-and-a-half miles northwest of Stonehaven in the former county of Kincardineshire. The house is situated on the north banks of the Cowie Water slightly upstream of the confluence with Cowton Burn. Rickarton is a category B listed building. Rickarton House was constructed in the first decade of the 19th century for William Rickart Hepburn. He commissioned the City Architect of Aberdeen, John Smith, to undertake the work.

The house and the estate became the property of the Bairds in the mid 19th century. It is currently owned by the Baron of Rickarton, Ury, and Lochwood.
