= James Giles (painter) =

Scottish painter and landscape architect

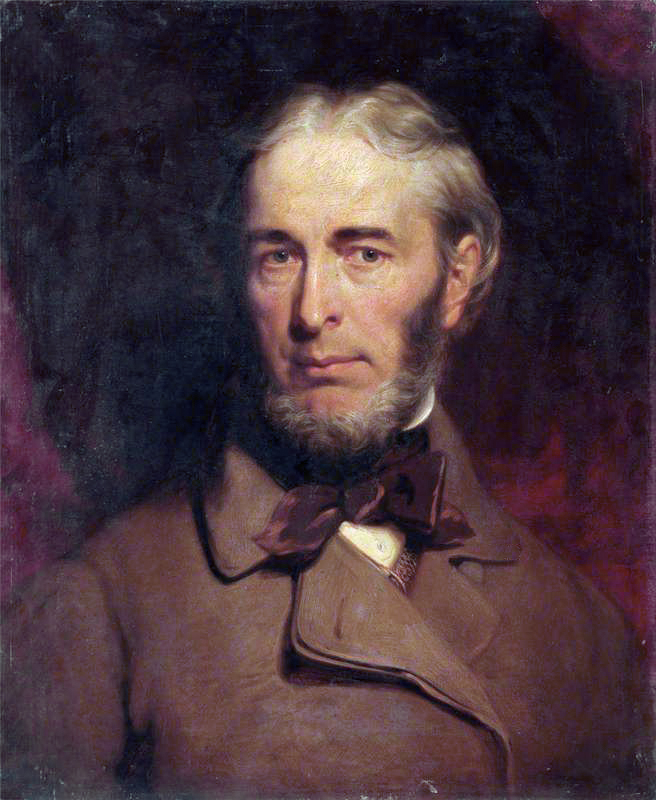
- Self portrait
- Born: James William Giles; 4 January 1801; Aberdeen, Scotland
- Died: 6 October 1870 (aged 69); Aberdeen, Scotland
- Known for: Landscape painting
- Elected: Royal Scottish Academy
- Patrons: Queen Victoria

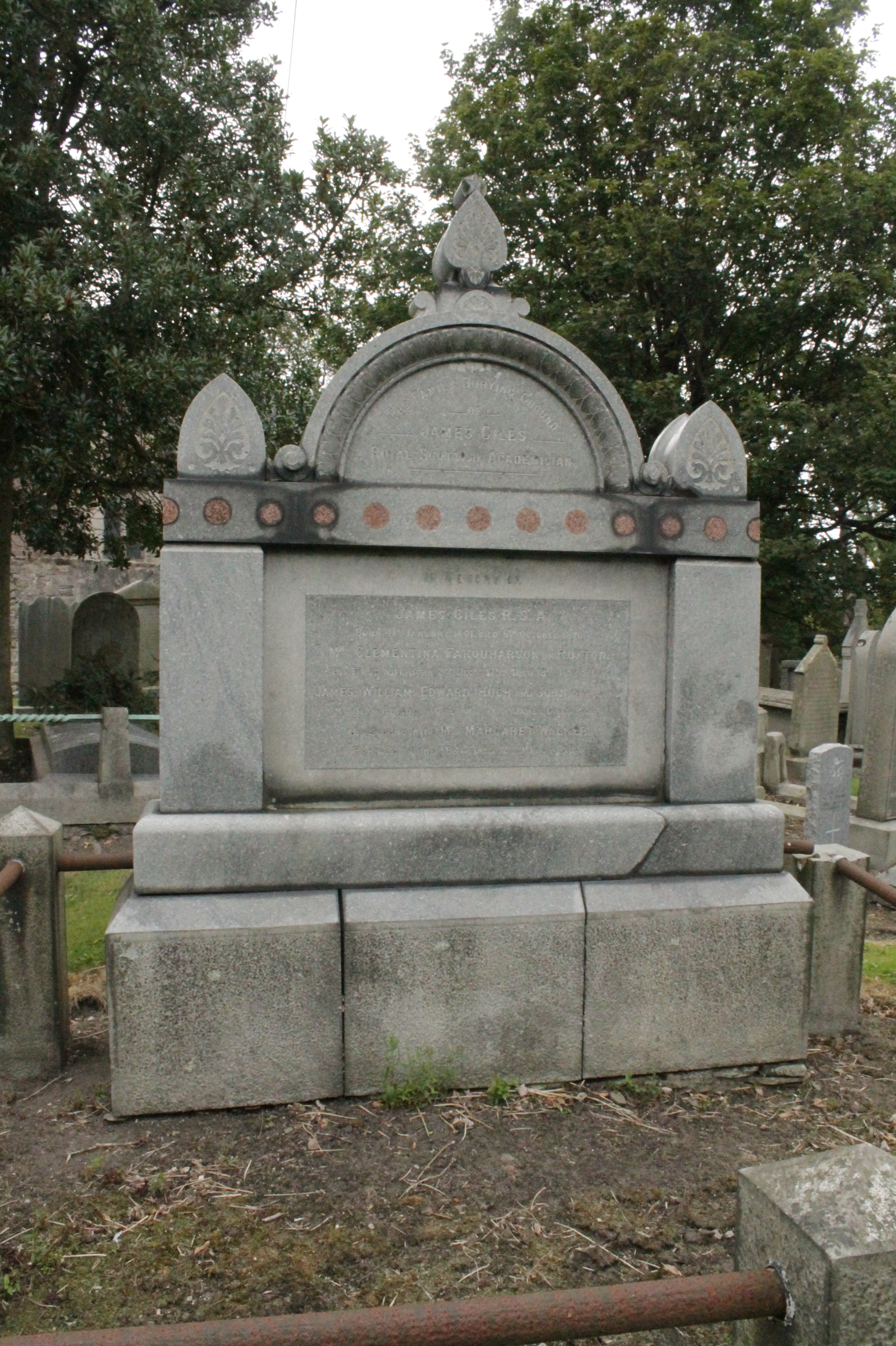
The grave of James Giles RSA, churchyard of St Machar's Cathedral

James William Giles ARSA (4 January 1801 – 6 October 1870) was a Scottish landscape painter. Several of his landscapes were commissioned and purchased by Queen Victoria and members of the Scottish aristocracy. He was a member of the Royal Scottish Academy.

== Life ==
Giles was born in Glasgow on 4 January 1801, the son of a designer at the local calico. The family moved to Aberdeen around 1805 where his father worked in a printing factory at Woodside, Aberdeen, an artist of some repute. His father's early death threw his son at an early age upon his own resources. His mother was named Jean Hector.

At 13 he maintained himself, his mother and sister by painting, and before he was 20 was teaching private classes in Aberdeen. At 21 he married a widow Clementina Farquharson. Shortly afterwards he made a tour through Scotland and visited the continent, and on his return home he settled in Aberdeen at 64 Bon Accord Street, where a plaque commemorates him. He then became a member of the Royal Scottish Academy and elected to the council of the Spalding Club. Success in his profession soon gave him prestige and modest wealth. He lived next door to his sister Jane and her husband James Robertson. Giles was both versatile and shrewd: he excelled not only as a landscape-artist and portrait-painter but also as a town-planner and landscape-designer, designing such notable Aberdeen features as the Demeter Sculpture above Simpson House and the obelisk, now in the Duthie Park, which formerly stood in the quadrangle of Marischal College. But above all James Giles was a landscape painter. His close friendship with George Hamilton-Gordon, 4th Earl of Aberdeen (and British Prime Minister in the mid-1850s) was of major importance. Not only did he design the gardens and parkland of the Earl's estate at Haddo House in Aberdeenshire, but after Queen Victoria had viewed a painting by Giles of the old Balmoral Castle, the lease of which had been held by the Earl's younger brother Robert until his death, she decided to lease it without having actually seen what would become her Scottish residence from 1848 on, and in 1852 she purchased Balmoral with its lands. The old castle was completely rebuilt, and it is surprising how closely the new Balmoral resembles Giles' painting of its predecessor. In later years Giles was to carry out several commissions for the royal family and these remain in the possession of H.M. the present queen.

Some of his finest work is represented by his posthumously published Drawings of Aberdeenshire Castles, commissioned by Lord Aberdeen. This comprises a series of some ninety watercolour sketches, completed between 1838 and 1855. They are brilliantly executed, and offer a fine impression of these old Scottish buildings. Most of the original pictures are preserved in the James Giles Room at Haddo House, and copies of the entire set were published in 1936 by the Third Spalding Club.

His earliest successes were in portrait-painting, however his visit to Italy gave him a taste for classic landscape, which he never entirely lost, for the mist seldom hangs about his mountains, even when the scene is laid near "dark Lochnagar". He was a keen angler, and fond of painting the result of a successful day's fishing. These pictures were his best works. He first exhibited at the "Royal Institution for the Encouragement of the Fine Arts in Scotland", and in 1829 became an academician of the Royal Scottish Academy, and contributed numerous works to its exhibitions from that time until near the close of his career. He also exhibited frequently at the British Institution in London, and occasionally at the Royal Academy and the Society of British Artists. His last work was a painting of himself, his wife, and youngest son, which he left unfinished. In 1852 he is listed as a member of the council to The Spalding Club.

== Family ==
By his first wife, Giles had six children: a daughter, Emily, and five sons. All the sons predeceased him, which may account for a certain melancholy displayed by Giles in later life. His wife, Clementina, died in 1866, and Giles subsequently married Margaret Walker, by whom he had a son and a daughter. So the Giles line did not die out. Giles himself died 6 October 1870 and is buried at Aberdeen in the graveyard of St Machar's Cathedral in Old Aberdeen where a granite tombstone of his own design stands prominently among the others to the east of the church. Next to him lies his brother-in-law, Peter Robertson.

By his first wife, Clementina Farquharson or Ruxton (a widow), he had two sons, James and John, one of whom gave great promise as an artist, but died of consumption at the early age of 21.

His first wife died in 1866. His second wife was Margaret Walker (1846-1883) forty-five years his junior.

== Overview ==
During his lifetime, Giles was among the first to be mentioned as one of the most vital of the Aberdeen artists – his patrons included the landed aristocracy of Aberdeenshire and Queen Victoria – but he has been little remembered in subsequent surveys in Scottish art. This is due in part to the fact that he spent most of his working life in Aberdeen – unlike his contemporaries who left the north-east to find fame in London.

== Work ==
Giles was a versatile artist. He specialised in portrait and landscape painting, but in addition was a successful landscape architect, designing a number of public gardens and monuments in Aberdeen, in addition to landscaping estates in Aberdeenshire.

Giles' spiritual home was Italy, where he spent three years from 1823 to 1826. There he followed the well-trodden pathways of the 18th century Grand Tour to the many points of historic interest. The bright Italian light fascinated Giles, and all his sketches are enlivened with an impression of this Mediterranean atmosphere. The sights that he saw and recorded in Italy were to remain with him for the rest of his life. His watercolour sketches often provided materials for the oils he painted and exhibited on his return to Scotland.

Some thirty of his works are held at Haddo House and shown on Art UK. Also at Haddo House, a series of water colour paintings by Giles depicting eighty-five Scottish castles.

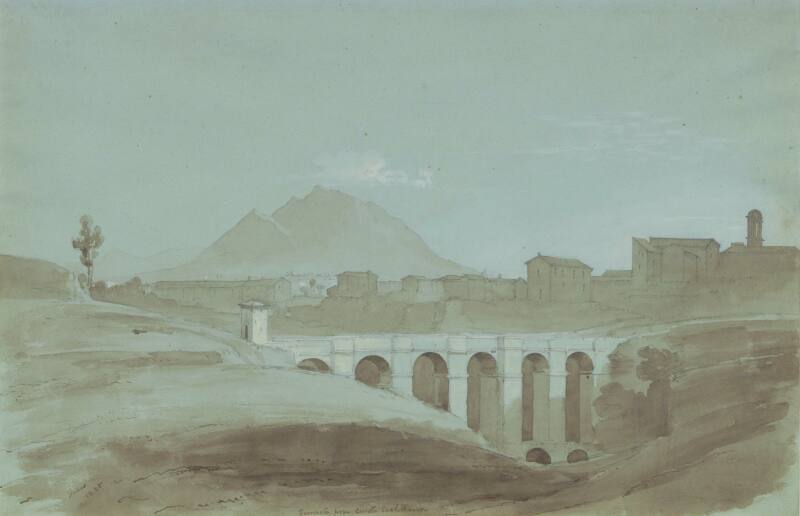
Sorracte from Civita Castellana - ABDAG003545

== Museums and galleries ==
- National Portrait Gallery (6 portraits)
- National Gallery of Scotland (The Weird Wife)
- Aberdeen Archives, Gallery & Museums
