= William Rickart Hepburn =

Scottish Politician and Soldier (died 1807)

William Rickart Hepburn (died 13 January 1807) was a Scottish politician and soldier who lived in Kincardineshire and was responsible for the construction of Rickarton House.

He was the eldest son of Lieutenant-Colonel Robert Rickart Hepburn of Rickarton House, MP for Kincardineshire, and Magdalene Murray, and was born in Scotland during the latter part of the 19th century. He joined the British army and served with the 31st Regiment of Foot during the French revolutionary and Napoleonic wars. He rose to the rank of Lieutenant-Colonel and commanded the regiment during its time in the West Indies, 17974-97.

In 1796 he married Janet Paul of Rathlodge, Fetteresso. The couple had two sons, Robert and William, and a daughter, Madeline. His great-great-grandsons were Canadian politicians, Brigadier-General Bernard Rickart Hepburn and James de Congalton Hepburn.

He died in London on 13 January 1807.

== See also ==
- Fetteresso Castle
- Muchalls Castle
- Ury House
