= List of castles in Aberdeenshire =

This is a list of castles in Aberdeenshire, Scotland.

== List ==
Name	Type	Date	Condition	Ownership	Location	Notes	Picture
Abergeldie Castle	Tower house	About 1550	Preserved	Gordon family	Near Crathie NO 2870 9528	Leased to the Royal Family 1848–1970	
Auchenhove Castle		16th century	Slight remains		AboyneNJ 55438 02455		
Banff Castle	Unknown	12th century	No remains	N/A	Banff NJ 68936 64201		
Balmoral Castle	Baronial house	1856	In use as a residence	Private residence of The King	Royal Deeside; NO254950	On the site of a 15th-century castle	
Balquhain Castle	Tower house	14th century	Ruined	Private	West of Inverurie; NJ7315923603	Visited by Mary, Queen of Scots	
Birse Castle	Baronial house	1911	Restored as a residence	Private	Forest of Birse; NO520906	Rebuilt 1911	
Bognie Castle	Tower house	1660s	Ruined	Private	Huntly; NJ595450	Also known as Conzie Castle	
Braemar Castle	Tower house	17th century	Preserved	Owned by the Farquharsons of Invercauld and managed by Braemar Community Ltd.	Braemar; NO155923		
Cairnbulg Castle	Z-plan tower house	14th century	In use as a residence	Lady Saltoun	Cairnbulg; NK015639	Restored in the 19th century. Also known as Philorth Castle. One of the Nine Castles of Knuckle.	
Cluny Castle	Z-plan castle	c. 1604	In use as a residence	Private	South of Monymusk; NJ6943412038		
Cluny Crichton Castle	Tower house	1666	Ruined		North of Banchory		
Cobairdy Castle	Tower house	16th century	No remains		North east of Huntly		
Corgarff Castle	Tower house	c. 1550	Preserved	Historic Scotland	Strathdon; NJ254086		
Corse Castle	L and Z-plan castle	16th century	Ruined		Lumphanan		
Corsindae House	L and U-plan castle	16th century	Occupied		North of Banchory		
Coull Castle		13th century	Slight remains		Coull, near Aboyne		
Craigievar Castle	Tower house	1626	Preserved	NTS	Alford; NJ556093	decorative plasterwork	
Craigston Castle	Tower house	1607	In use as a residence	Private	Turriff; NJ762550		
Crathes Castle	Tower house	1596	Preserved	NTS	Banchory; NO735967	painted ceilings	
Culsalmond	Unknown	16th century	Site		South east of Huntly	Probably on site of the present Newton House	
Cushnie Castle	Unknown	16th century	Slight remains		South west of Alford	Succeeded by Cushnie Lodge	
Daugh Castle	Probably wooden structure		Site		North of Huntly		
Dee Castle	Tower house	15th century	Site		Glenmuick		
Delgatie Castle	Tower house	1579	Preserved	Delgatie Castle Trust	Turriff; NJ754505	painted ceilings	
Dorlaithers Castle	Unknown	Unknown	Site		Near Turriff		
Drum Castle	Tower house and Jacobean mansion with additions	13th and 17th century with 19th century additions	Preserved	NTS	Drumoak; NJ796005	Tower built as a royal hunting lodge c.1286, extended in 1323. Jacobean mansion completed in 1619.	
Drumtochty Castle	Castellated house	1812	Occupied	Private	Auchenblae; NO699800		
Dumbreck Castle					Ellon NJ 8982 2888		
Easter Clune Castle	Tower House				Near Banchory NO 6123 9150		
Dundarg Castle		14th century, rebuilt 16th century	Ruined	Private	New Aberdour; NJ895648	One of the Nine Castles of Knuckle	
Dunnideer Castle	Tower house	c. 1260	Ruined	Private	Insch; NJ613282		
Dunnottar Castle	Courtyard castle	16th century	Ruined	Private	Stonehaven; NO880838		
Eden Castle	Z-plan tower house	1577	Ruined	Private	Banff; NJ697587		
Esslemont Castle	Tower house	14th century or earlier	Ruined	Private	Ellon; NJ932298		
Fasque Castle	Baronial house	1809	Occupied	Private	Fettercairn; NO648756		
Fedderate Castle	L-plan tower house	1257	Ruined		Near New Deer		
Fetteresso Castle	Castellated house	1761	Occupied as flats	Private	Stonehaven; NO841855	Originally a 14th-century tower house	
Findlater Castle	Courtyard castle	14th century	Ruined	Private	Sandend; NJ540671		
Foveran Castle	Unknown	12th or 13th century	Collapsed 1720	Clan Forbes	Southeast of Ellon		
Fordyce Castle	L-plan castle	1592		Private residence	Fordyce; NJ555637		
Castle Forbes	Castellated house	1815	Occupied as a residence	Chief of Clan Forbes	Alford; NJ621191		
Castle Fraser	Z-plan tower house	1636	Preserved	NTS	Inverurie; NJ722125		
Freefield Castle	Unknown	Unknown; existed 1654	Site		11.5 miles (18.5 km) north of Inverurie57.3703°N 2.5388°W	Replaced by Freefield House	
Fyvie Castle	Tower house	13th century with additions	Preserved	NTS	Fyvie; NJ763393	Most of the current structure (including the beautiful gatehouse) dates to the late 14th through late 16th century	
Harthill Castle	Castellated mansion	17th century, restored	Occupied as a residence	Private	Near Inverurie 57.3156°N 2.5214°W		
Hatton Castle	Castellated mansion	1814 but incorporates earlier structure	Occupied as a residence	Private	Turriff; NJ7561646950		
Gairnieston Castle			No remains		NJ 7344 5509		
Gartly Castle	Keep	15th century	No remains		Near Gartly 57.3897°N 2.7770°W		
Glenbuchat Castle	Z-plan tower house	1590	Ruined	Historic Scotland	Kildrummy; NJ397148		
Huntly Castle	L-plan tower house	15th to 17th century	Ruined	Historic Scotland	Huntly; NJ532408	decorative plasterwork	
Inchdrewer Castle	Tower house	16th century	Ruined	Private	South-west of Banff; NJ6550560672		
Inverallochy Castle	Courtyard castle	13th century	Ruined		Inverallochy; NK040628	One of the Nine Castles of Knuckle	
Invercauld Castle	Baronial house	18th century	In use as accommodation	Private	Royal Deeside; NO173924		
Inverey Castle	Laird's house	17th century	Ruined		Deeside 56.985658°N 3.501474°W		
Inverugie Castle	Motte and bailey	12th century	Ruined		Inverugie; NK102482		
Kemnay House	L-Plan Castle, altered	17th century	Occupied		57.22784865°N 2.442272462°W		Kemnay House (geograph 1836648)
Kildrummy Castle	Castle of enceinte	Mid to late 13th century	Ruined	Historic Scotland	Kildrummy; NJ451165		
Kincardine Castle	Baronial house	19th century	In use as a residence	Private	Royal Deeside; NN928093	14th century ruin nearby	
Kindrochit Castle	Keep	14th century	Ruined		Braemar; NO151913	Founded by Malcolm Canmore in 1059	
Kinnaird Castle	Tower house	1570	In use as a lighthouse	Northern Lighthouse Board	Fraserburgh; NJ998675	Now the Museum of Scottish Lighthouses, one of the Nine Castles of Knuckle	Fraserburgh Lighthouse (Kinnaird Castle) and the wine tower
Kinnairdy Castle	Tower house	14th and 16th centuries	In use as accommodation	Private	Aberchirder; NJ609497		
Kinord Castle		14th century	Ruined		Loch Kinord	May be known as Loch Kinord Castle	
Knock Castle	Tower house	Around 1600	Ruined	Historic Scotland	Ballater; NO352951		
Knockhall Castle	Tower house	1565	Ruined		Near Newburgh, Aberdeenshire		
Lauriston Castle	Courtyard castle with later additions	13th century	Still used as a residence	Private	St Cyrus; NO761666		
Leslie Castle	Tower house	14th century	Restored as a residence	Private	Leslie, Auchleven; NJ599248		
Lesmoir Castle	Courtyard castle	16th century	Ruined		Rhynie; NJ47072806		
Lonmay Castle	Motte?	Before 1720	No remains	N/A	Crimond; NK061608	One of the Nine Castles of Knuckle	
Migvie Castle	Enclosure castle	13th century	Slight remains		Tarland		
Muchalls Castle	L-plan tower house	13th and 17th century	In use	House of Burnett	Muchalls; NO892918		
Castle Newe	Z-plan tower house	1831	No remains	N/A	Strathdon; NJ378122	Incorporates a tower from 1604	
Castle of Park	Z-plan tower house incorporated in later building		In use as a residence	Private	Cornhill; NJ588571		
Peill Castle	Motte?	Before 1650	Replaced by Leith Hall	NTS	Near Kennethmont, in Aberdeenshire	Alternative names: Leithhall; Peilside	
Pitsligo Castle	Keep	1424	Ruined		Rosehearty; NJ937670	Also known as Pitsligo Palace, one of the Nine Castles of Knuckle	
Pitfichie Castle	An intermediate link between a simple oblong tower and a fully developed Z plan.	Around 1564	A former ruin and restored in the 1970s/1980s, it is known in use as a private residence	Private	Monymusk, near Inverurie		
Pittulie Castle		16th century	Ruined		Rosehearty; NJ944670	One of the Nine Castles of Knuckle	
Castle of Rattray	Motte	From 12th century	No remains	N/A	Rattray; NK088578	One of the Nine Castles of Knuckle	
Ravenscraig Castle	L-plan tower house	15th century	Ruined		Inverugie; NK095487		
Slains Castle	Tower house, rebuilt as castellated house	1597, rebuilt 1837	Ruined	Private	Cruden Bay; NK101361	"New" Slains Castle	
Slains Castle	Tower house	13th century	Ruined		Collieston; NK052300	"Old" Slains Castle, destroyed 1594	
Terpersie Castle	Z-plan tower house	1561	Restored	Private	Alford; NJ546202		
Tillyhilt Castle			Traces		Tarves; NJ85423180		
Tolquhon Castle	Courtyard castle	1589	Ruined	Historic Scotland	Pitmedden; NJ872286		
Turriff Castle			Site		Turriff; NJ72154996		
Udny Castle	Tower house	14-15th century		Private	North east of Udny Green; NJ882268		
Wardhill Castle							
Wardhouse Castle	Tower house	13th century	Traces		NJ59302888		
Waterton Castle	Tower house	16th century	Ruined		NJ97293033		
Westhall Castle	L-plan tower house	16th century		Private	Insch; NJ673266		

== See also ==
- Castles in Scotland
- List of castles in Scotland
- List of listed buildings in Aberdeenshire
