= Turriff (disambiguation) =

Turriff is a town and civil parish in Aberdeenshire in Scotland.

Turriff may also refer to:

== Places ==
- Turriff, Victoria

== Buildings and structures ==
- Turriff railway station
- Turriff Castle

== Sport ==
- Turriff United F.C., senior football club
- Turriff RFC, rugby union club

== Others ==
- Turriff (surname)
