= Plunton Castle =

Ruined tower house in Scotland

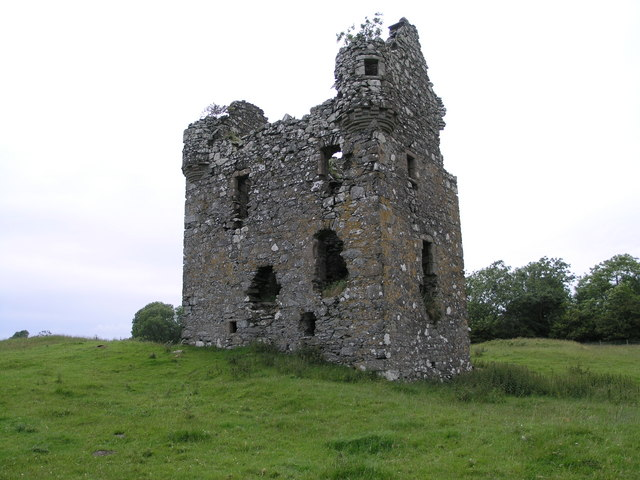

- Location of the tower within Dumfries and Galloway
- 54°49′55″N 4°10′24″W
- Type: Tower house
- Location: Plunton, near Gatehouse of Fleet, Dumfries and Galloway

Scheduled monument
- Designated: 1937
- Reference no.: SM1129

Plunton Castle is a ruined L-plan tower house between Kirkandrews and Gatehouse of Fleet in Dumfries and Galloway, Scotland. Built around 1575 for the Lennoxes of Plunton, it passed by marriage to the Murrays of Broughton in the late 17th century. It was still inhabited in 1684, when it was described by Reverend Symson in his Large Description of Galloway as "a good strong house", but by 1838, when it was painted by George Colomb, it had been abandoned and had fallen into a ruinous condition.

Well defended on all sides by burns, a ditch and marshy ground, it has numerous gun loops built into its walls. There were iron grilles in the windows, and it was further protected by a high wall, but its defensive arrangements were weakened by the fact that one of its ground floor chambers does not communicate with the other rooms of the tower, and was only accessible from the outside. Archaeological evidence for a walled courtyard, gardens and ancillary buildings survives beneath ground level in the surrounding field.

Plunton Castle's romantic setting inspired Walter Scott's poorly received melodramatic play, The Doom of Devorgoil. It was designated a scheduled monument in 1937. Historic Environment Scotland describes its condition as fragile, but notes that it would be possible to restore the building to an inhabitable condition, as has happened at nearby Barholm Castle.

== Description ==
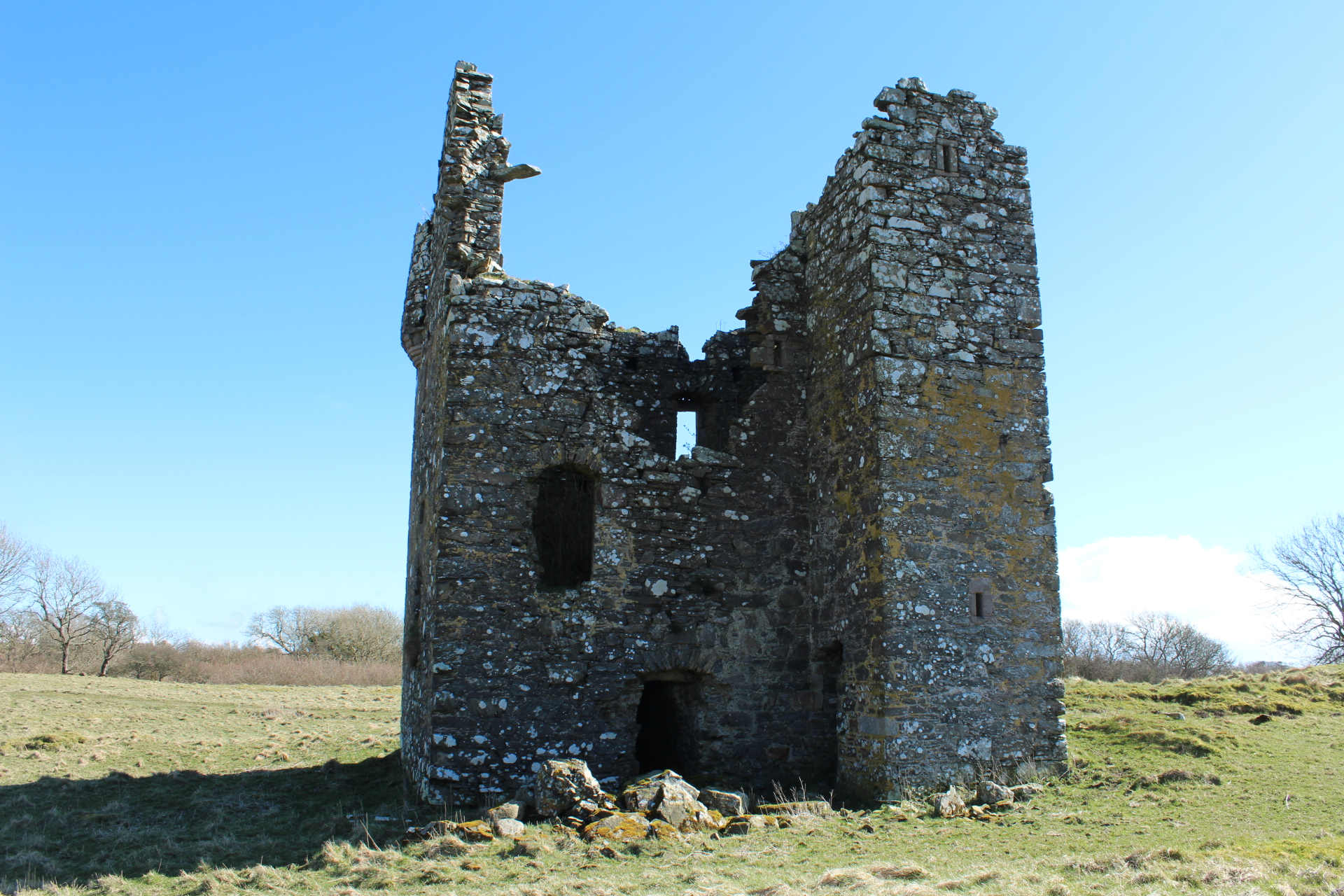
Plunton castle viewed from the north, with the stair wing on the right

Plunton Castle is situated in farmland, about three miles south-east of Gatehouse of Fleet, and is approached by a farm track from a minor road. It is a roofless, L-plan tower house, with a projecting wing at the south-west corner that housed a turnpike stair. The main block measures 9.1 metres (30 ft) by 6.5 metres (21 ft), and has walls roughly 1.1 metres (3.6 ft) thick. It has three storeys and an attic, rising to a height of 10.7 metres (35 ft). It is mostly rubble-built of local greywacke, with dressed sandstone detailing, much of which has been plundered for use elsewhere since the building fell into disuse.

Situated on a shallow rise, it is nevertheless well-defended by the Plunton Burn on the west side, a steep ditch to the north, and marshy ground on the other two sides which would have made it difficult to approach. The ground floor is unusual for a tower house of its type, in that it is divided into two tunnel vaulted chambers, probably used as store rooms, which do not communicate with each other. The southern one is entered through the stair wing, but the northern chamber can only be accessed from the courtyard. Maurice Lindsay, director of the Scottish Civic Trust, describes this arrangement as "defensively weak", and John R. Hume, former chief inspector of historic buildings for Historic Scotland, notes that such a design is "extremely rare" and a "breach of security", which was partially addressed by the existence of a walled barmkin. The defensive wall for this no longer survives, but the stonework on the north-west angle of the castle walls shows where it would have been connected to the main block, and indicates that it was 2.74 metres (9.0 ft) in height. Each of the ground floor chambers has splayed gun loops in its gable walls, which would have given defenders within the rooms a wide field of fire.

The castle's great hall is on the first floor. This was furnished with a plain fireplace, about 1.8 metres (5.9 ft) in width, beneath a corbelled-out lintel, built into the middle of the west wall, with an aumbry to its left. The room was lit with windows in all four walls; these have had much of their dressed stone removed, but what remains shows signs that there were originally iron grilles in each of them, with opening shutters beneath fixed glazed panes.

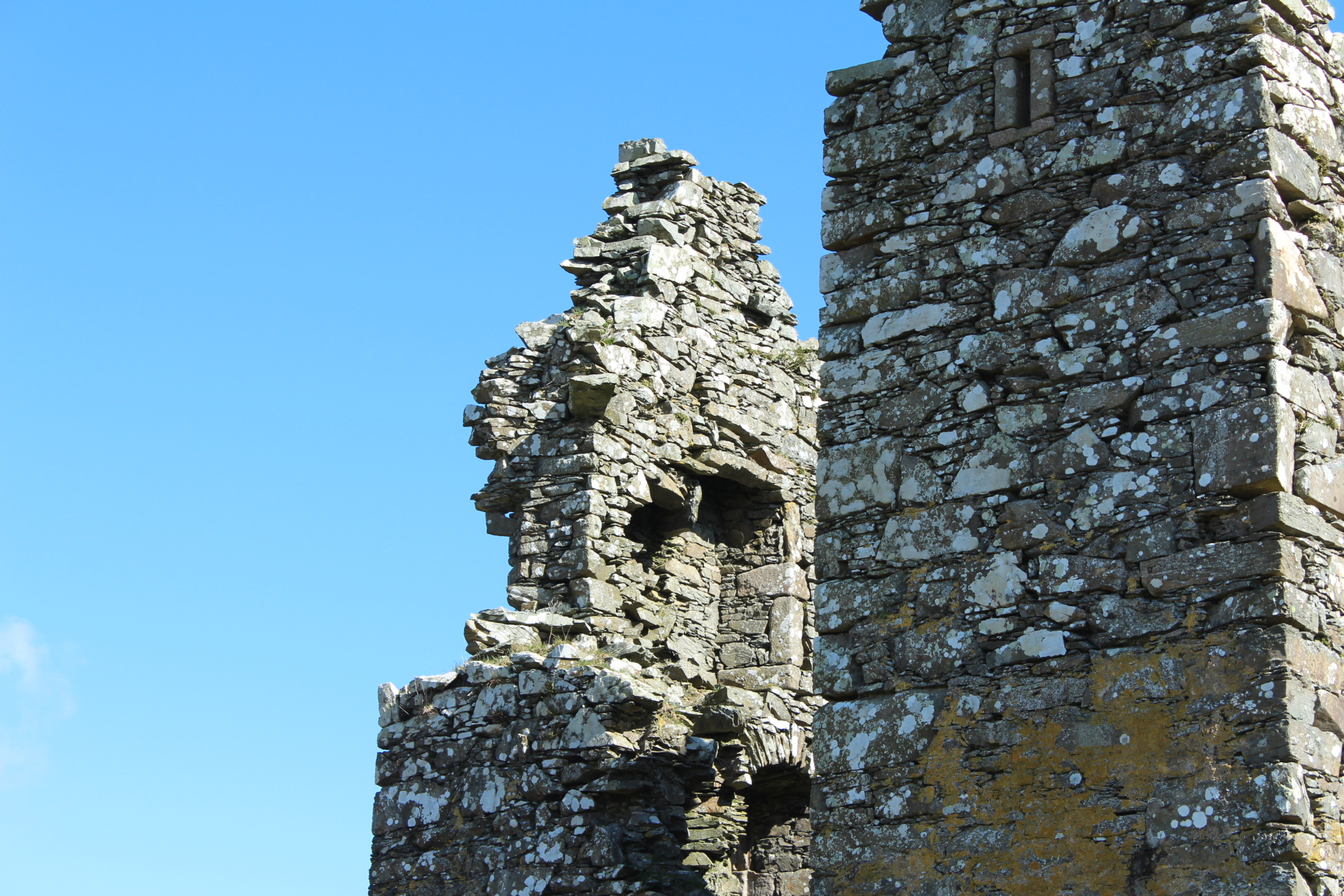
One of the fireplaces in the gable of the attic

Fireplaces in each of the gable walls of the second storey suggest that it was divided into two chambers, also lit with windows, but the wooden floor is no longer present. The attic above these, also divided into two chambers with gable fireplaces, gave access to the turrets, which are supported with corbels and a top row of dentils, at the north-west, north-east and south-east corners. These turrets each had windows giving a view out from the corners of the building, and gun loops angled downwards to allow defence of the outside walls. The north-west turret has mostly collapsed, but the other two survive almost intact apart from their roofs. At the south-west corner of the tower, the stair wing terminates in a gabled cap-house, now in a ruinous condition, which also has a gun loop.

Archaeological evidence for the existence of a courtyard, ancillary buildings and gardens survives in the field around the castle, but is covered by the turf of the field.

== History ==
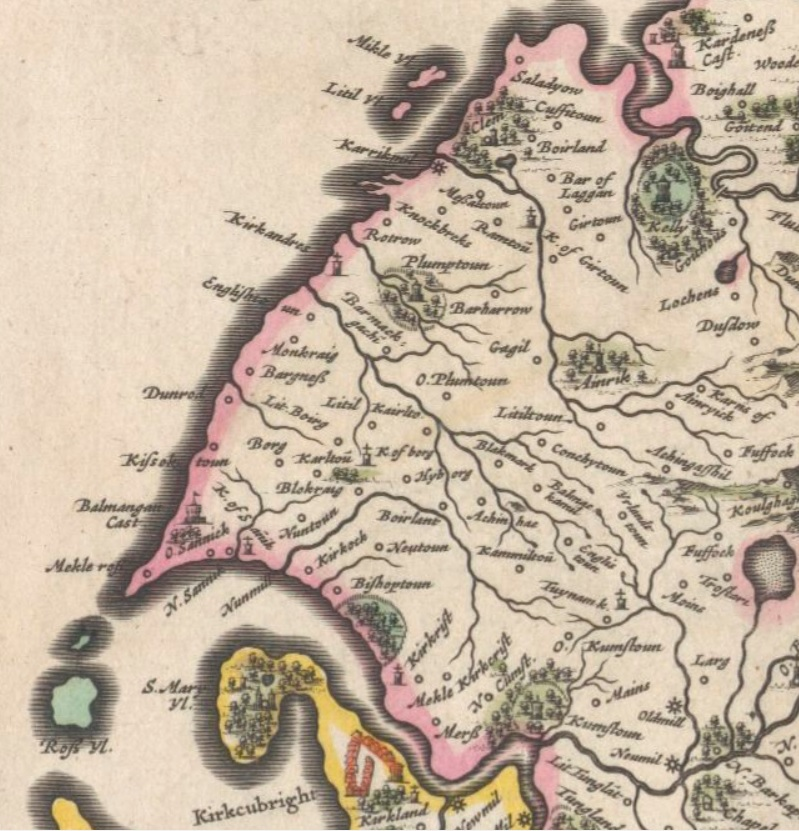
Pont's map of the region, first published by Blaeu in 1654, showing Plunton Castle (labelled as 'Plumptoun') in its enclosed deer park. The map is oriented so that west is up.

In 1455, the feud between the Douglases and the king resulted in their lands being forfeited. The crown divided the estate of Plunton into two parts, known as King's-Plunton and Plunton-M'Gee, since it was initially owned by the McGhie family. Plunton-M'Gee was later acquired by the Maclellans of Bombie, and King's-Plunton came into the hands of the Lennoxes of nearby Cally. By 1575, Andrew Lennox of Plunton had come into ownership of the whole estate, and the castle was most probably built for him and his future wife, his cousin Janet Lennox, replacing an older house on the site. The estate came to be known as Lennox Plunton, the name by which it is still known.

The castle passed by marriage into the possession of the Murrays of Broughton in the late seventeenth century. It appears in a 1654 map of the region, attributed to Timothy Pont and published by Joan Blaeu, which depicts it surrounded by a fenced-in deer park, and it was still in use in 1684 when the Reverend Symson referred to it as "a good strong house" in his book about the region, A Large Description of Galloway. It fell into disuse at some point after that, and much of its dressed stone, particularly that from around the windows, has been taken for use in buildings elsewhere. The tower was already in a ruinous state by 1838 when it was painted by George Colomb; his painting, Ruins of Plunton Castle, Scotland, is in the collection of the New-York Historical Society.

An Iron Age Celtic armband was discovered during excavations near the site in 1826; it was donated to the National Museum of Antiquities of Scotland in 1859, and is now in the collection of the National Museum of Scotland.

Plunton Castle was designated a scheduled monument in 1937.

== Conservation status ==
Plunton Castle is largely complete up to the tops of its walls, but Historic Environment Scotland describes its condition as fragile. They note that it could be restored to a habitable state in a similar manner to Barholm Castle, and that enough of the detailing of the building survives to make it possible to restore it faithfully, but that the resulting building would be small and the surrounding archaeology would complicate any such project. Its current owners have considered a number of restoration proposals, but as of 2021 no such project has been started.

== In literature ==
Plunton Castle was the model for the setting of Walter Scott's unsuccessful melodrama, The Doom of Devorgoil.

== Sources ==
- Gifford, John (1996). The Buildings of Scotland:Dumfries and Galloway. London: Penguin. ISBN 0140-71067-1.
- Historic Environment Scotland. "Plunton Castle, Lennox Plunton (Scheduled Monument SM1129)".
- Hume, John R (2000). Dumfries and Galloway: An Illustrated Architectural Guide. Edinburgh: The Rutland Press. ISBN 1-873-190-344.
- Lindsay, Maurice (1994). The Castles of Scotland. London: Constable. ISBN 0-09-473430-5.
- Maxwell-Irving, Alastair M. T. (2014). The Border Towers of Scotland 2: Their Evolution and Architecture. Stirling: Alastair M. T. Maxwell-Irving. ISBN 978-1-907931-37-6.
- "Blaeu Atlas of Scotland, 1654". National Library of Scotland.
- "Plunton Castle". Canmore. Historic Environment Scotland.
- "Plunton Castle". Historic Environment Scotland.
- "Bracelet". National Museums of Scotland.
- "Museum Collections: The Ruins of Plunton Castle, Scotland". New-York Historical Society Museum and Library.
- Symson, Andrew (1684). A large description of Galloway. W. and C. Tait. p. 24.
