= List of listed buildings in Insch, Aberdeenshire =

This is a list of listed buildings in the parish of Insch in Aberdeenshire, Scotland.

== List ==
| Name | Location | Date Listed | Grid Ref. (Note: Sometimes known as OSGB36, the grid reference (where provided) is based on the British national grid reference system used by the Ordnance Survey. • "Guide to National Grid". Ordnance Survey. • "Get-a-map". Ordnance Survey.) | Geo-coordinates | Notes | LB Number (Note: Historic Environment Scotland assign a unique alphanumeric identifier to each designated site in Scotland, for listed buildings this always begins with "LB", for example "LB12345".) | Image |
|---|---|---|---|---|---|---|---|
| Commerce Street, Husk Mill | | May 20th, 1992 | | 57°20′24″N 2°37′02″W | Category B | 12992 | Upload Photo |
| Mill Of Boddam | | September 11th, 1984 | | 57°21′44″N 2°37′32″W | Category C(S) | 9069 | Upload Photo |
| Insch, Insch Station Including Waiting Room And Footbridge | | May 4th, 1999 | | 57°20′15″N 2°37′02″W | Category C(S) | 46162 | Upload Photo |
| Insch Savings Bank, High Street | | April 16, 1971 | | 57°20′35″N 2°36′40″W | Category B | 9066 | Upload Photo |
| Old Parish Church Of Insch, Churchyard | | September 11th, 1984 | | 57°20′32″N 2°36′38″W | Category C(S) | 9065 | Upload Photo |
| Bridge Near Site Of Castle Of Wardhouse Over The Shevock | | April 16th, 1971 | | 57°20′55″N 2°40′48″W | Category B | 9071 | Upload Photo |
| St. Drostan's Episcopal Church, Commerce Street, Insch | | September 11th, 1984 | | 57°20′29″N 2°36′57″W | Category C(S) | 9067 | Upload Photo |
| Old Parish Church Of Insch (St. Drostan) | | April 16th, 1971 | | 57°20′32″N 2°36′39″W | Removed from Listed Buildings on October 20th, 2016 | 9064 | Upload Photo |
| Drumrossie House | | April 16th, 1971 | | 57°20′32″N 2°36′07″W | Category B | 6741 | Upload Photo |
| Castle Of Dunnideer | | | | 57°20′32″N 2°38′46″W | Category B | | Upload Photo |
| Insch, Western Road, 1 And 2 The Old Manse With Walled Garden And Ancillary Buildings | | | | 57°20′33″N 2°37′27″W | Category B | 50049 | Upload Photo |
| Drumrossie House, Coach House, And Stables | | | | 57°20′39″N 2°36′03″W | Category C(S) | 9068 | Upload Photo |

== Key ==
The scheme for classifying buildings in Scotland is:

- Category A: "buildings of national or international importance, either architectural or historic; or fine, little-altered examples of some particular period, style or building type."
- Category B: "buildings of regional or more than local importance; or major examples of some particular period, style or building type, which may have been altered."
- Category C: "buildings of local importance; lesser examples of any period, style, or building type, as originally constructed or moderately altered; and simple traditional buildings which group well with other listed buildings."

In March 2016 there were 47,288 listed buildings in Scotland. Of these, 8% were Category A, and 50% were Category B, with the remaining 42% being Category C.

== See also ==
- List of listed buildings in Aberdeenshire
