= Carsluith Castle =

Ruined tower house in Galloway, Scotland

- Wigtown Bay, Dumfries and Galloway; GB grid reference NX495542
- The castle in 2017

Site information
- Type: Tower house
- Owner: Historic Environment Scotland
- Open to the public: Yes

Location
- Location within Dumfries and Galloway
- Location within Dumfries and Galloway
- Coordinates: 54.8595°N 4.3466°W

Site history
- Built: Late 15th century
- Built by: James Lindsay of Fairgirth

Carsluith Castle is a ruined tower house, dating largely to the 16th century. It is located beside Wigtown Bay in the historical county of Kirkcudbrightshire in Galloway, Scotland, around 4.8 kilometres (3.0 mi) south east of Creetown.

== History ==
The lands of Carsluith were held by the Cairns family until 1460, when they passed to James Lindsay of Fairgirth, Chamberlain of Galloway. He was probably the builder of the main tower at Carsluith in the late 15th or early 16th century. His grandson, Sir Herbert Lindsay, was killed at Flodden in 1513. The castle then passed, through the daughter of Sir Herbert Lindsay, to Richard Brown. The Browns (or Brouns) of Carsluith added to the castle, building the stair tower on the north side in the 1560s. A Roman Catholic family, the Browns feuded with the Protestant McCullochs of Barholm, and in 1579 Richard's son John was fined £40, when his son, also John, failed to appear on a charge of murdering the McCulloch laird of Barholm.

Another descendant of Richard Brown or (Broun) was Gilbert Brown of Carsluith, who served as the last abbot of Sweetheart Abbey, near Dumfries, before the Protestant Reformation. Later it was alleged several times that Gilbert was sheltering Jesuit priests at Carsluith, and in 1605 he was arrested for his Catholic sympathies. He was banished to France, where he became rector of the Scots College, Paris. He died in Paris in 1612.

The Browns of Carsluith emigrated to India in 1748, and the castle has not been occupied since. In the early 19th century, new farm buildings were built on to the castle, forming a U-plan steading which remains as a category C listed building.

Today the castle ruin itself is protected as a scheduled monument. It is now in the care of Historic Environment Scotland and is open to the public.

== The castle ==
Carsluith Castle is situated between the sea shore and the A75 road. There may once have been a moat or pond between the castle and the road.

The castle comprises a main tower 9.8 by 7.6 metres (32 by 25 ft), and a later stair tower, built on to the north east. The main tower is around 10m high to the eaves. Above this are crow-step gables, with corbelled wall walks along the gable ends. Three of the corners have round turrets. The stair tower is topped by a gabled cap-house. A sink at first floor level once drained via a carved gargoyle on the west side.

The ground floor entrance is via the stair tower. The Brown arms are carved above the door, with initials and the date 156-, the last digit being illegible, although it was said in the 19th century to have been legible as 4. The vaulted basement is divided into two cellars, with gunloops in the walls. Above is the hall with windows and a fireplace. Another floor would have had bedrooms, with an attic at the wall walk level, although these floors have gone. On the north side, holes exist in the outside wall which would have supported an external timber gallery linking the second floor rooms and stair tower.
