= Knock Castle, Aberdeenshire =

Ruined tower house in Aberdeenshire, Scotland

Coordinates: 57°2′34.98″N 3°4′2.07″W

Knock Castle
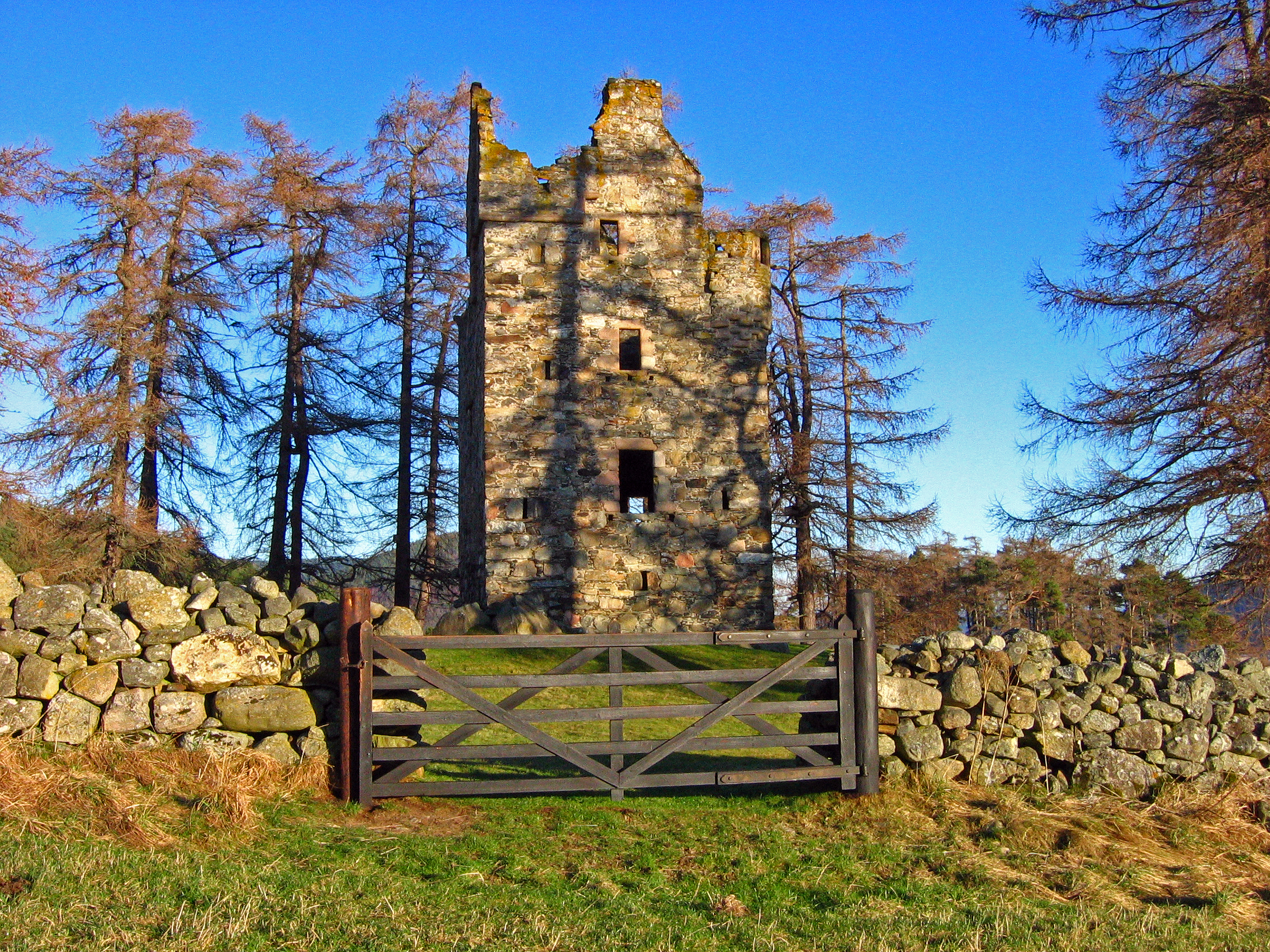
- Knock Castle in 2007
- Interactive map of the Knock Castle area

General information
- Location: Scotland

Knock Castle is a ruined tower house in Aberdeenshire, north-east Scotland. It is typical of the traditional type of residence of a laird, a Scottish landed gentleman. Knock Castle is in Royal Deeside, about 1 mile (1.6 km) west of the town of Ballater, and about 6 miles (9.7 km) east of Balmoral. It sits on a knoll in a field on the south side of Craig of the Knock, a low hill at the entrance to Glen Muick. The castle is a category B listed building, and is in the care of Historic Environment Scotland.

== Description ==
Knock Castle is a four-storey ruin, dating from approximately 1600. MacGibbon and Ross note resemblance to Birse Castle, also in Aberdeenshire, as well as similarities with Borders pele towers.

The rectangular tower measures about 27 feet (8.2 m) by 22 feet (6.7 m), with walls of about 4 feet (1.2 m) thick. The external walls of the castle survive intact, although the tower is roofless. The inside of the tower is entirely ruined, but the remains of a vaulted basement, used as a kitchen, and a spiral turnpike staircase can still be seen. At the top of the stair is a gabled cap house. An unusual feature at Knock is the defensive shot holes for pistols, of which three are located under each of the numerous windows. The shot holes are all angled to the ground, with the centre one pointing forward and the two outer holes pointing slightly askew.

The foundations of an enclosing courtyard wall are still visible. The entrance opened onto the north side of the surrounding courtyard, and would have been protected by a strong wooden door and an iron yett. Various outbuildings, including a brewery, stables, or bake house, for example, would have been set around the perimeter wall of the courtyard.

A short distance to the west is a motte, or mound, with the possible foundations of a 12th-century timber stronghold, known as the Old Castle Knock. Belonging to the Earls of Mar, this structure was destroyed in 1590 by the Clan Chattan (Macintosh). What little remains of the site appears to have evidence of a corn-drying kiln within.

== History ==
Knock Castle was granted to the Gordons of Abergeldie by the 4th Earl of Huntly after the battle of Corrichie, fought between George Gordon, 4th Earl of Huntly, and the forces of Mary, Queen of Scots commanded by James Stewart 1st Earl of Moray on 28 October 1562.

In 1592, a feud between the neighbouring Clan Forbes intensified when Henry Gordon 2nd Laird of Knock was murdered during a cattle raid by the Forbes and Clan Chattan men, his brother Alexander Gordon succeeded Henry and may have rebuilt or remodelled Knock Castle during his time there.

It is said that one day, Alexander Gordon sent his seven sons out to cut peat for the winter store but while the brothers were out working, they didn’t notice that they had strayed onto the Neighbouring Clan Forbes lands. After several hours of cutting, they were discovered by Forbes and his men. Subsequently, a battle ensued, which resulted in the deaths of all the brothers. After the fight, the Forbes decided to make an example of the Gordon boys by severing their heads and impaling them on the upright handles of their peat spades. After a while, the Gordon Laird began to become concerned about the whereabouts of his sons so he sent out one of his servants to look for the boys and give them a meal. When the servant discovered the boys’ heads all placed on the upright spades, he ran back to Knock Castle as fast as he could with the news of what had happened to the Lairds' seven sons. Alexander was at the top of the castle’s turnpike stair when the servant burst in the castle door shouting the news of the boys terrible fate, on hearing of the fate of his beloved sons, Alexander collapsed at the top of the stair and tumbled all the way down to his death. The Forbes Laird was then taken and executed with all his lands being forfeited to Abergeldie.

== Gallery ==
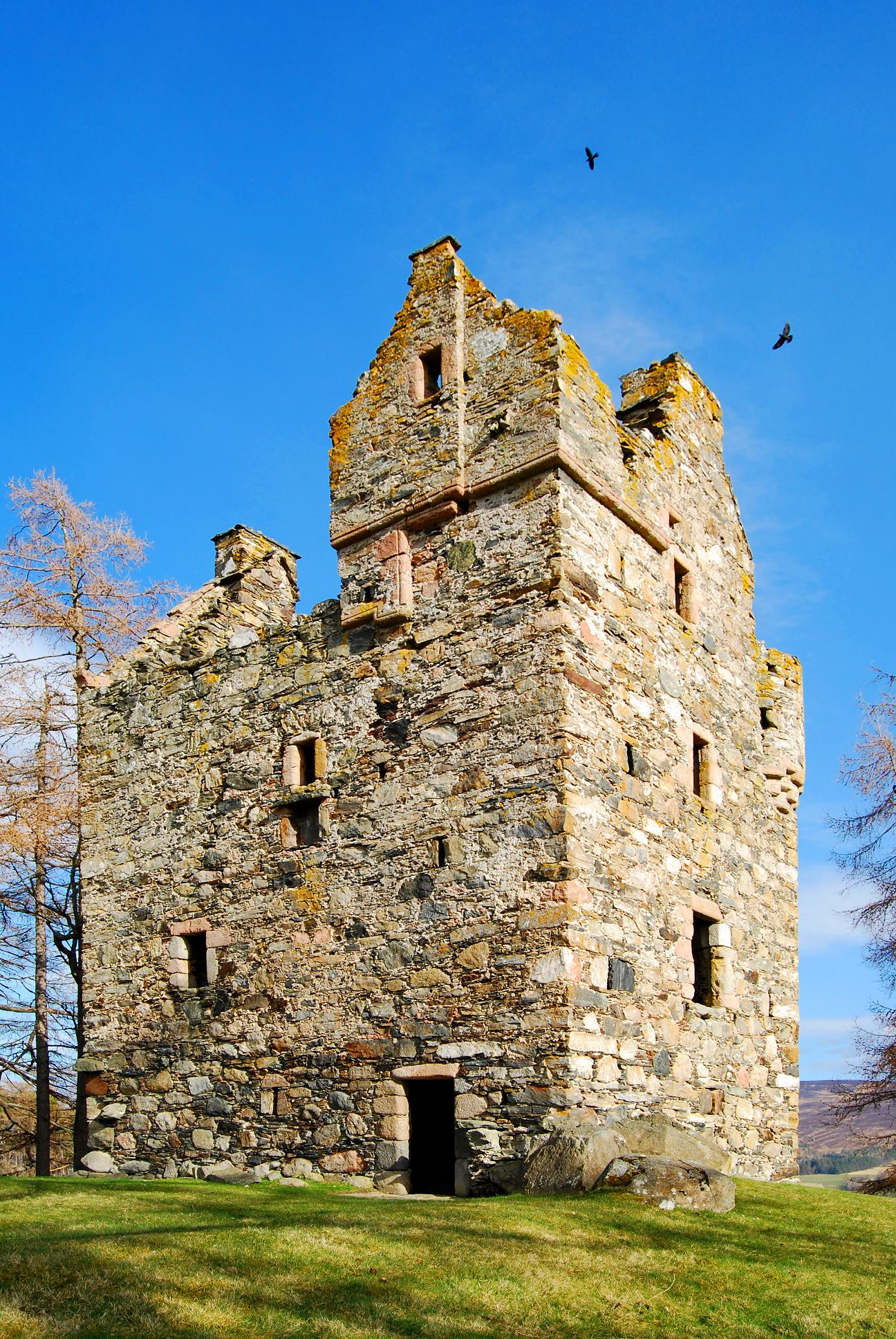
Knock Castle ruins, showing the cap house above the entrance

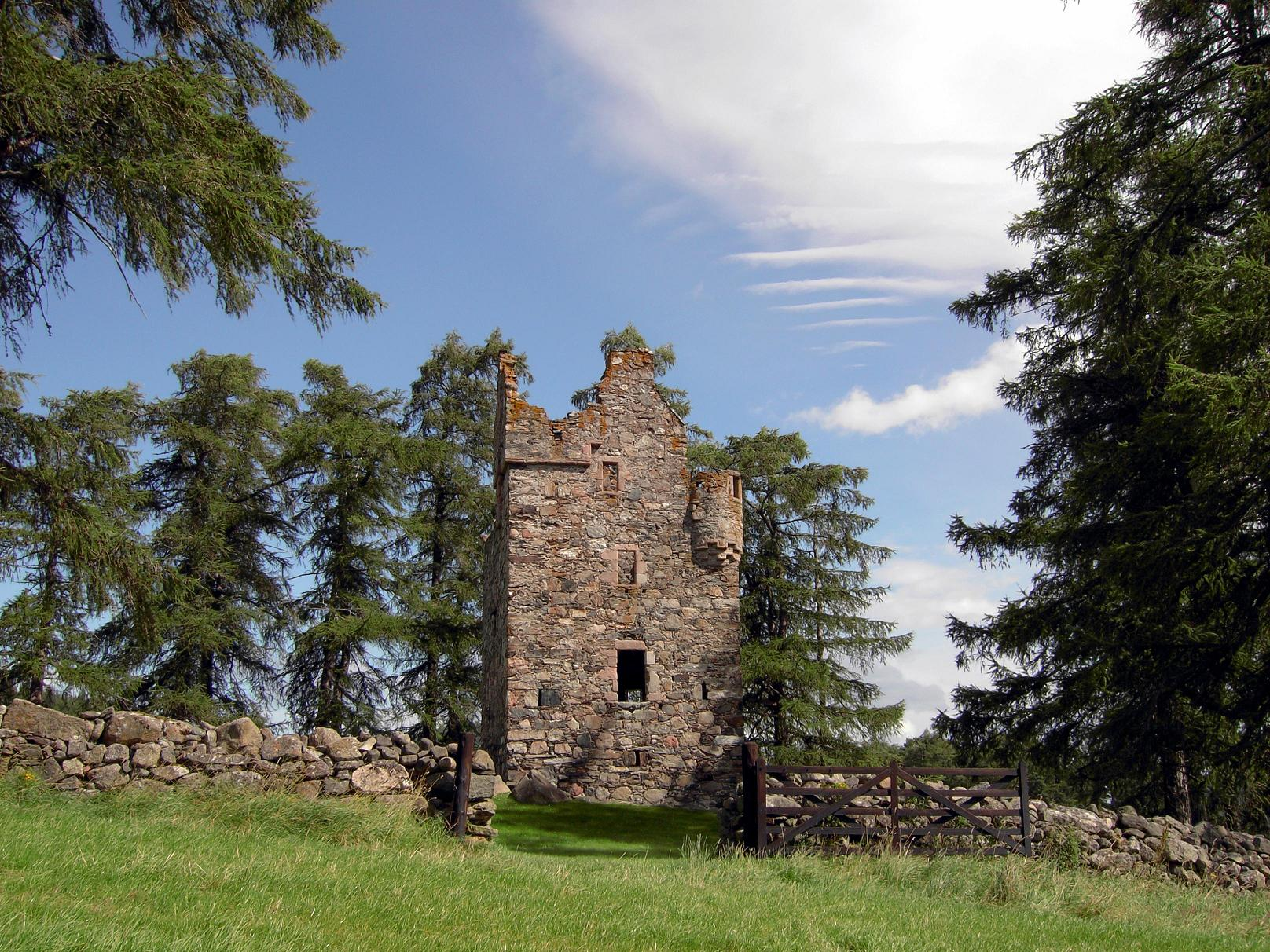
Approach to Knock Castle

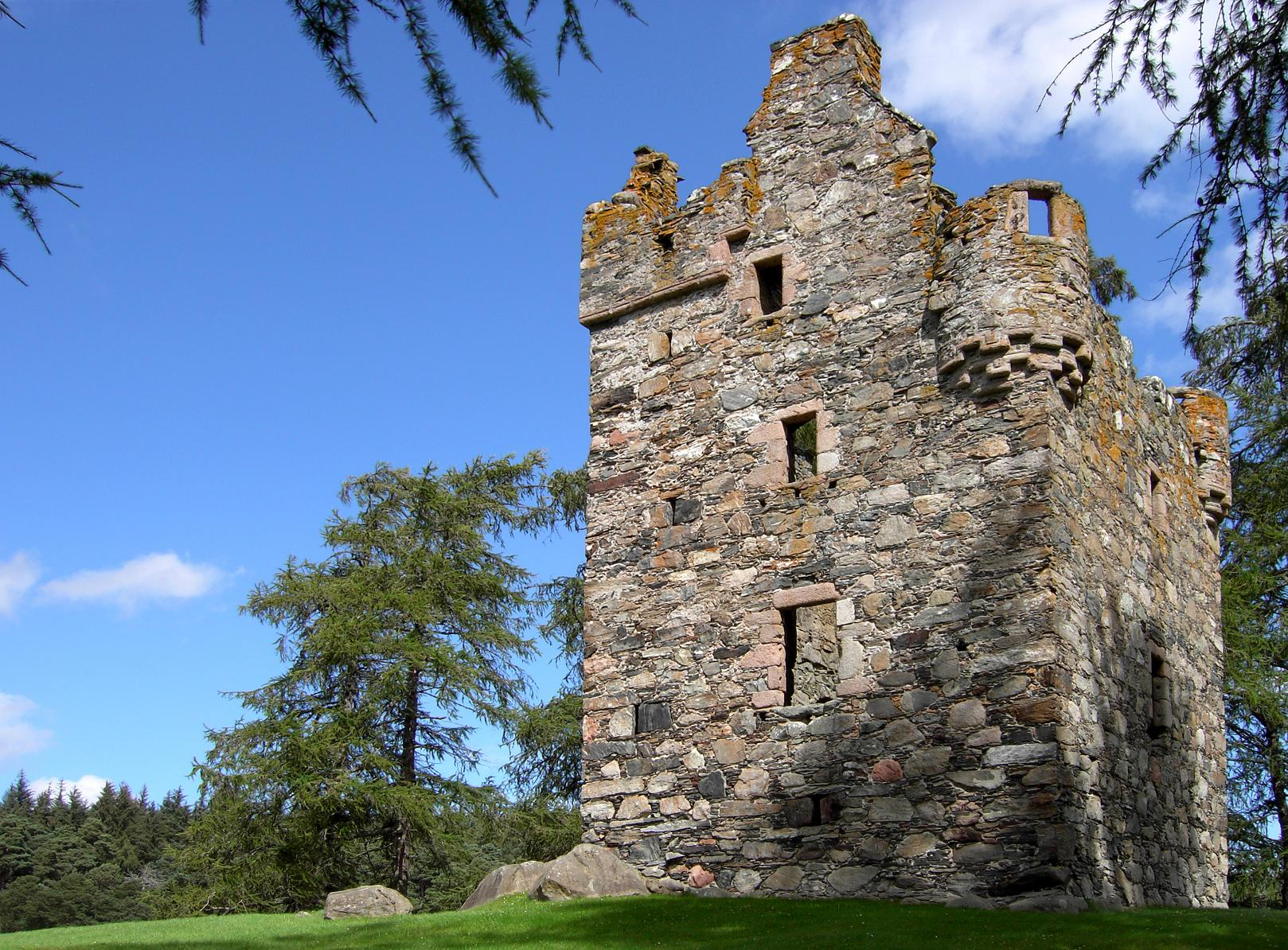
Corner of the tower, with bartizan (turret)

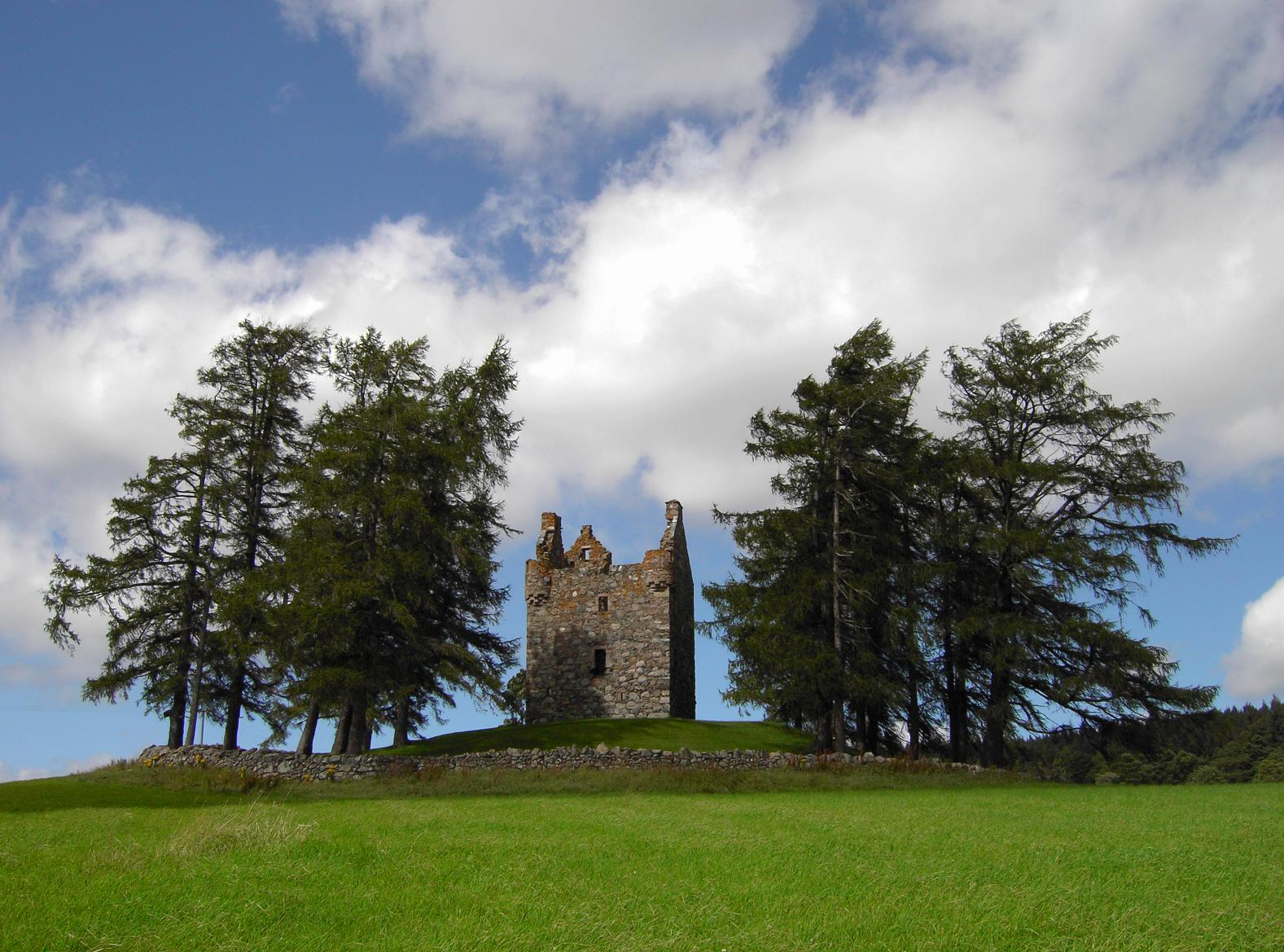
The tower on the slopes of Craig of the Knock
