= Cap-house =

Small room at the top of a spiral staircase

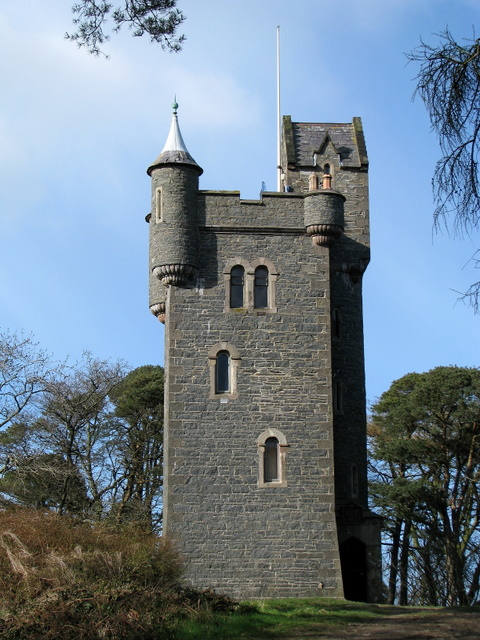
Helen's Tower in Northern Ireland, built in the 19th century in the Scots Baronial style, features a prominent cap-house (shown on the right)

A cap-house (sometimes written cap house or caphouse) is a small watch room, built at the top of a spiral staircase, often giving access to a parapet on the roof of a tower house or castle. They provided protection from the elements by enclosing the top of the stairway, and sometimes incorporated windows or gun loops. They were built in various forms, including square turrets, simple boxes, or small houses with gabled roofs, which were sometimes large enough to provide accommodation for a look-out.

Cap-houses were an authentic feature of the design of medieval and early-modern tower houses in Scotland, and were a frequent element used in the later Scottish Baronial architecture.

== Gallery ==
=== Medieval and early-modern cap-houses ===
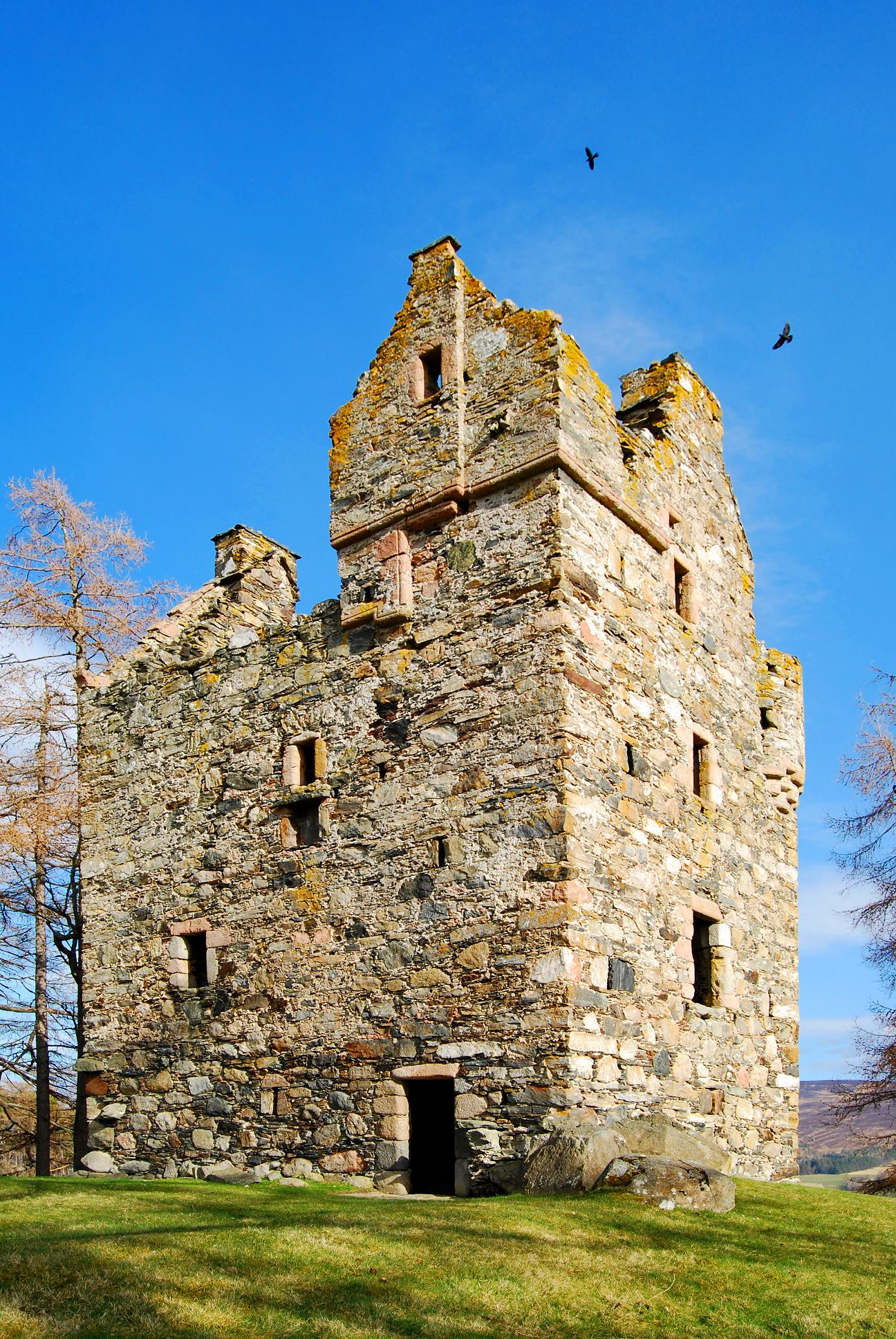
Knock Castle, Aberdeenshire, showing the cap-house above the entrance

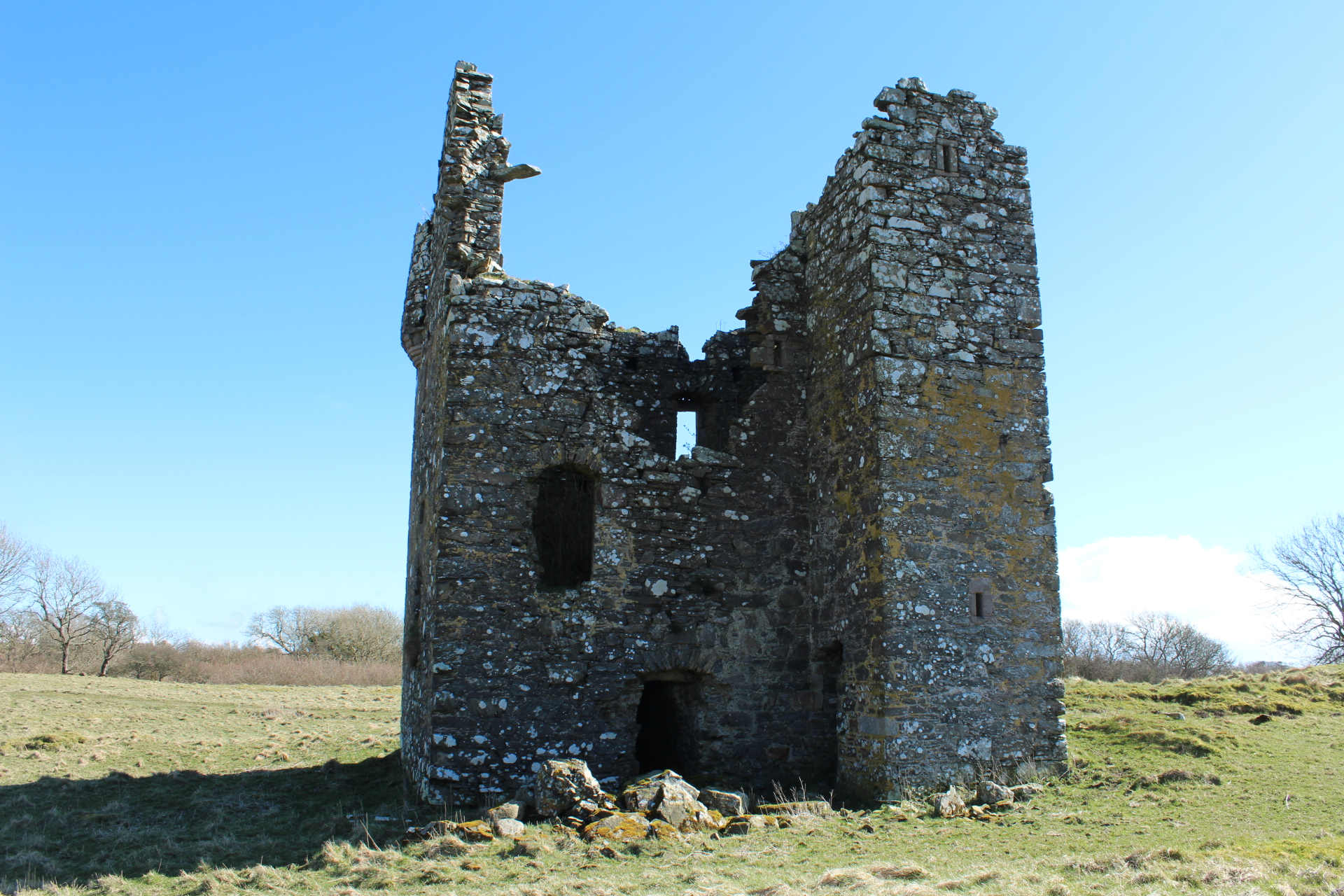
Plunton Castle, with a gabled cap-house at the top of the stair wing (shown on the right)

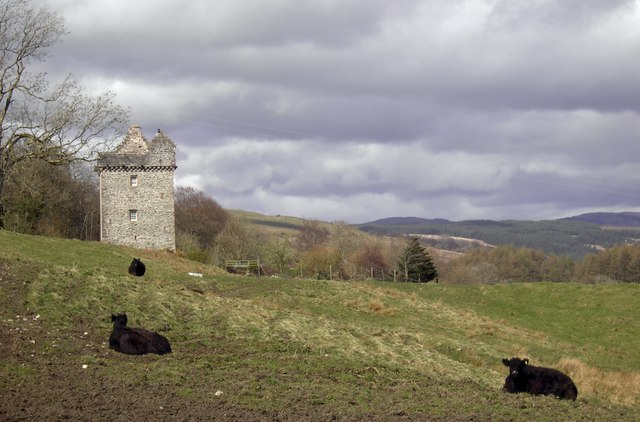
Rusco Tower, with a gabled cap-house on the right, giving access to a parapet around the main roof

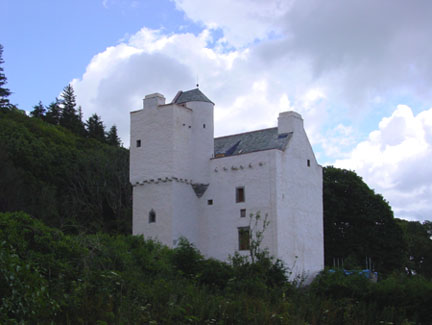
Barholm Castle's large cap-house, on the left

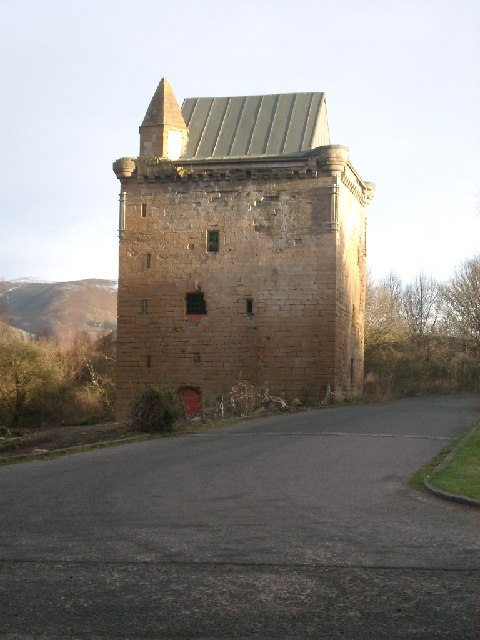
Sauchie Tower's cap-house, on the left, is hexagonal

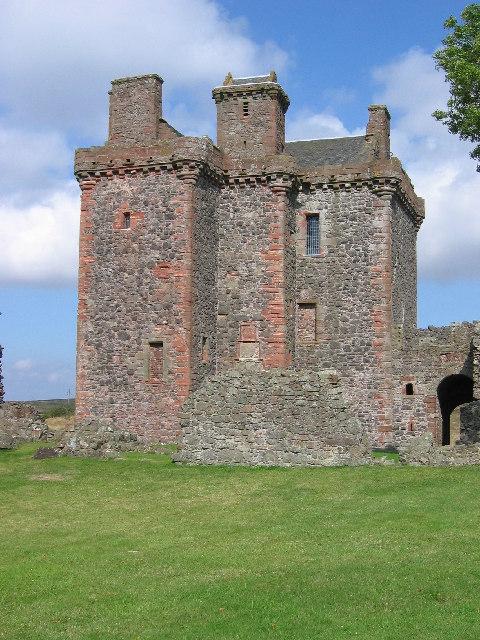
Balvaird Castle's cap-house, in the middle

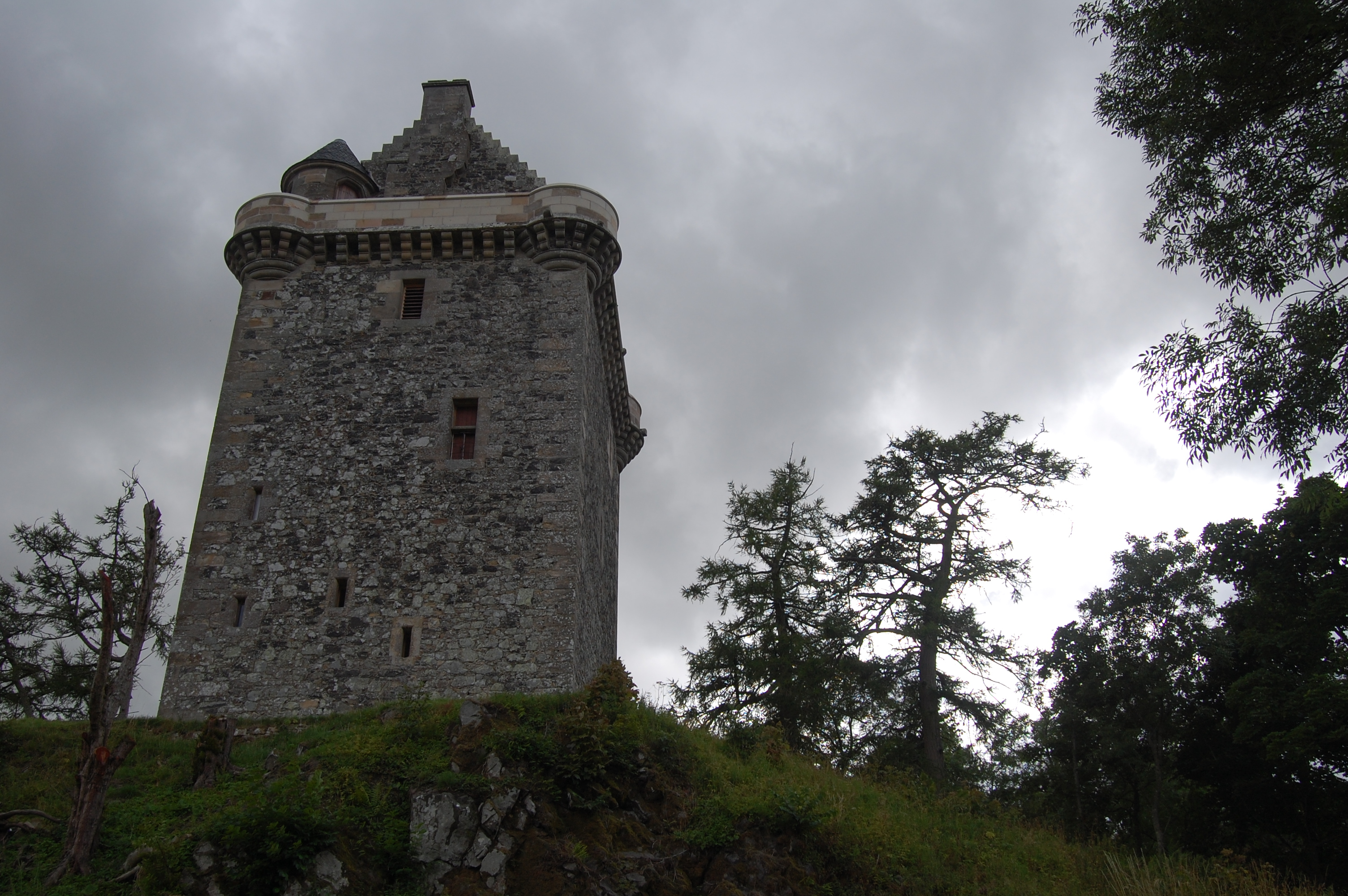
Fatlips Castle's cap-house, on the left, was renovated in 2013

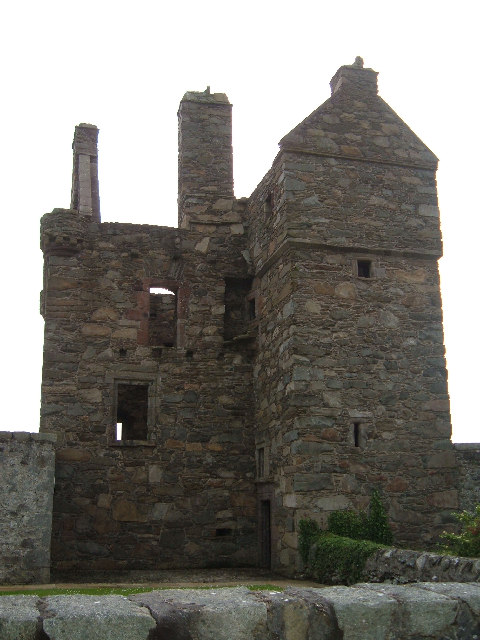
Carsluith Castle's gabled cap-house, on the right

=== Nineteenth-century Scottish Baronial cap-houses ===
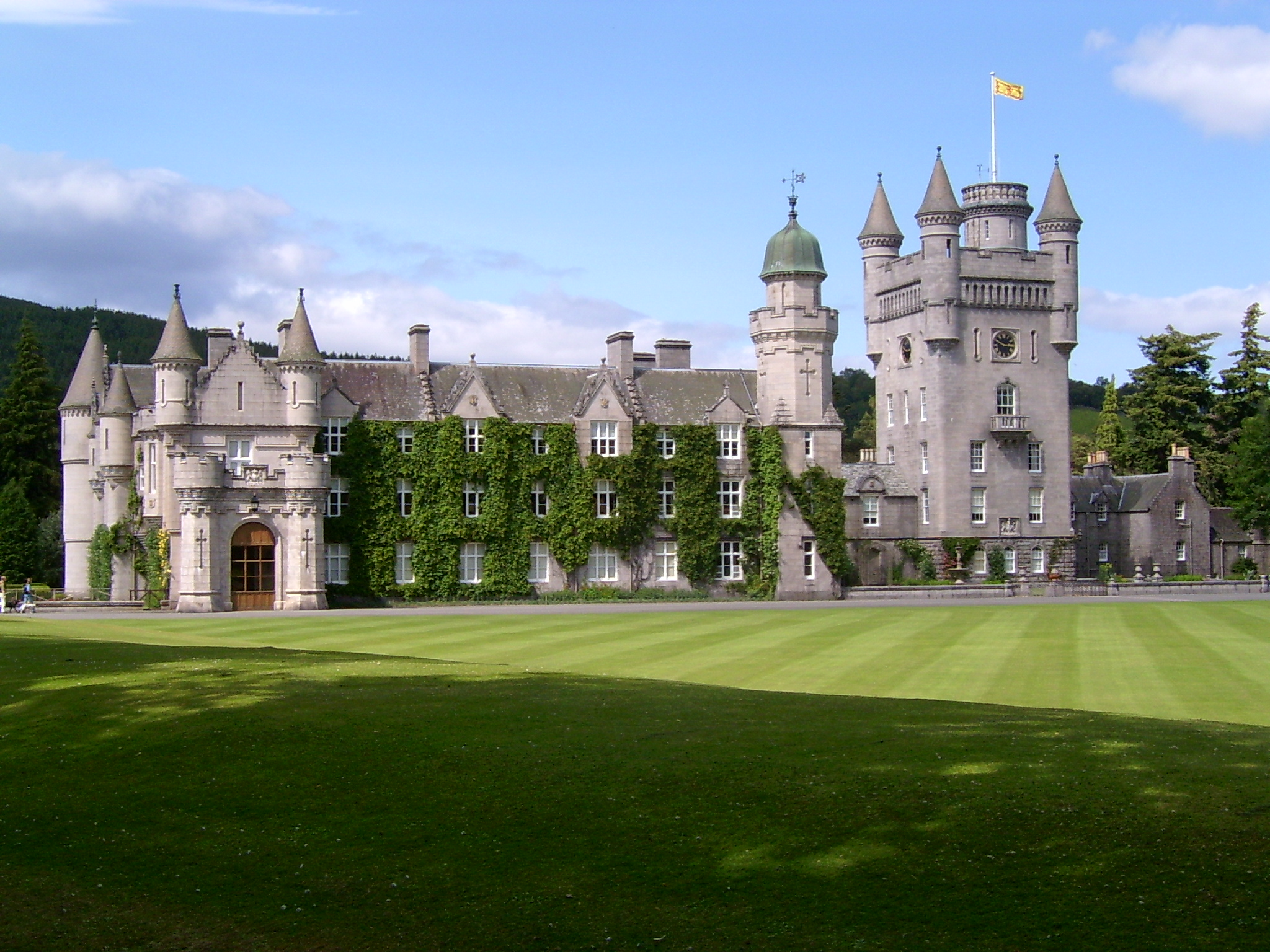
Balmoral Castle, with the Royal Standard of Scotland flying from a flagpole mounted on the roof of its cap-house

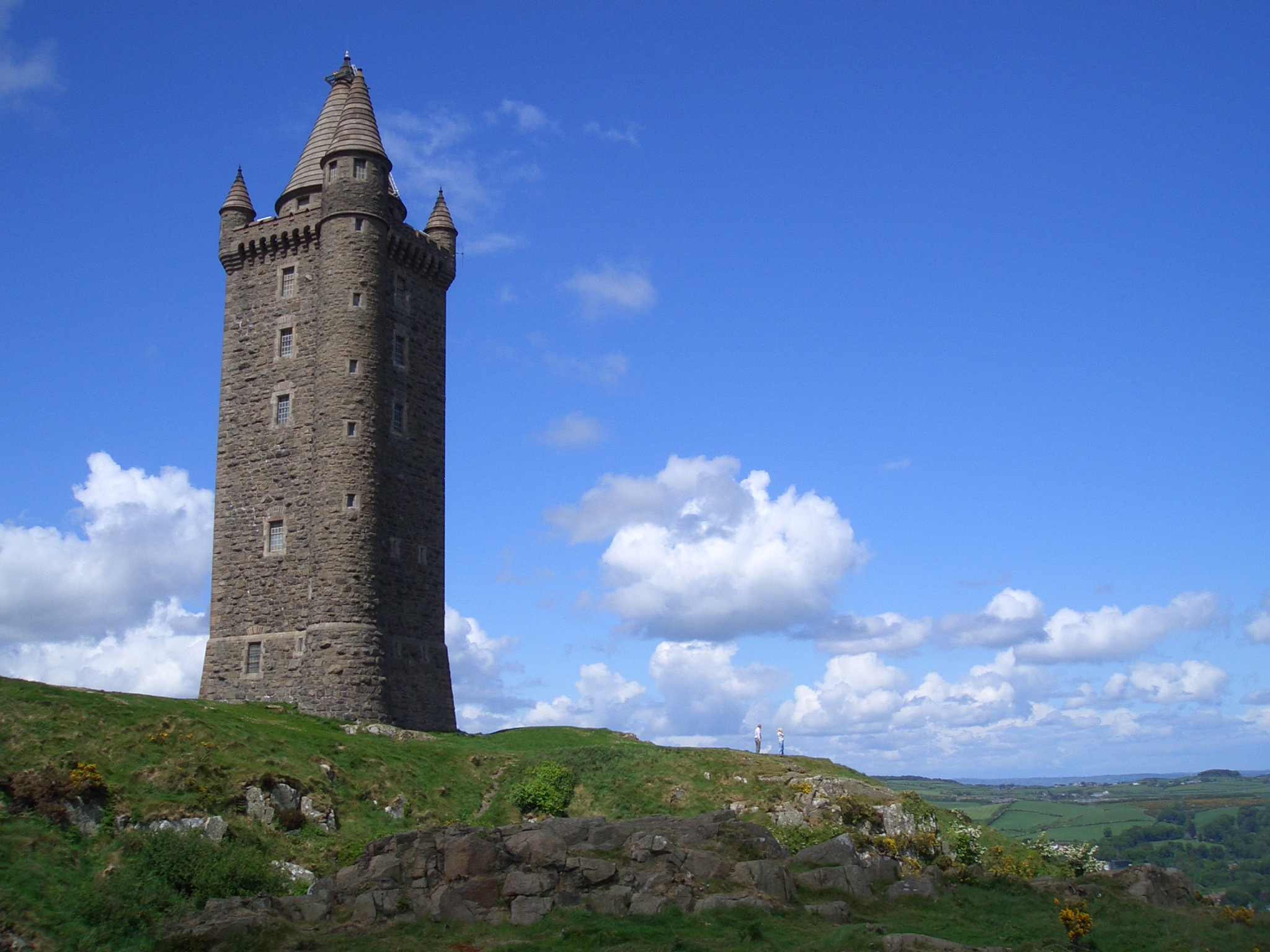
Scrabo Tower has a conical cap-house above its spiral staircase, with conical turrets on the other three corners

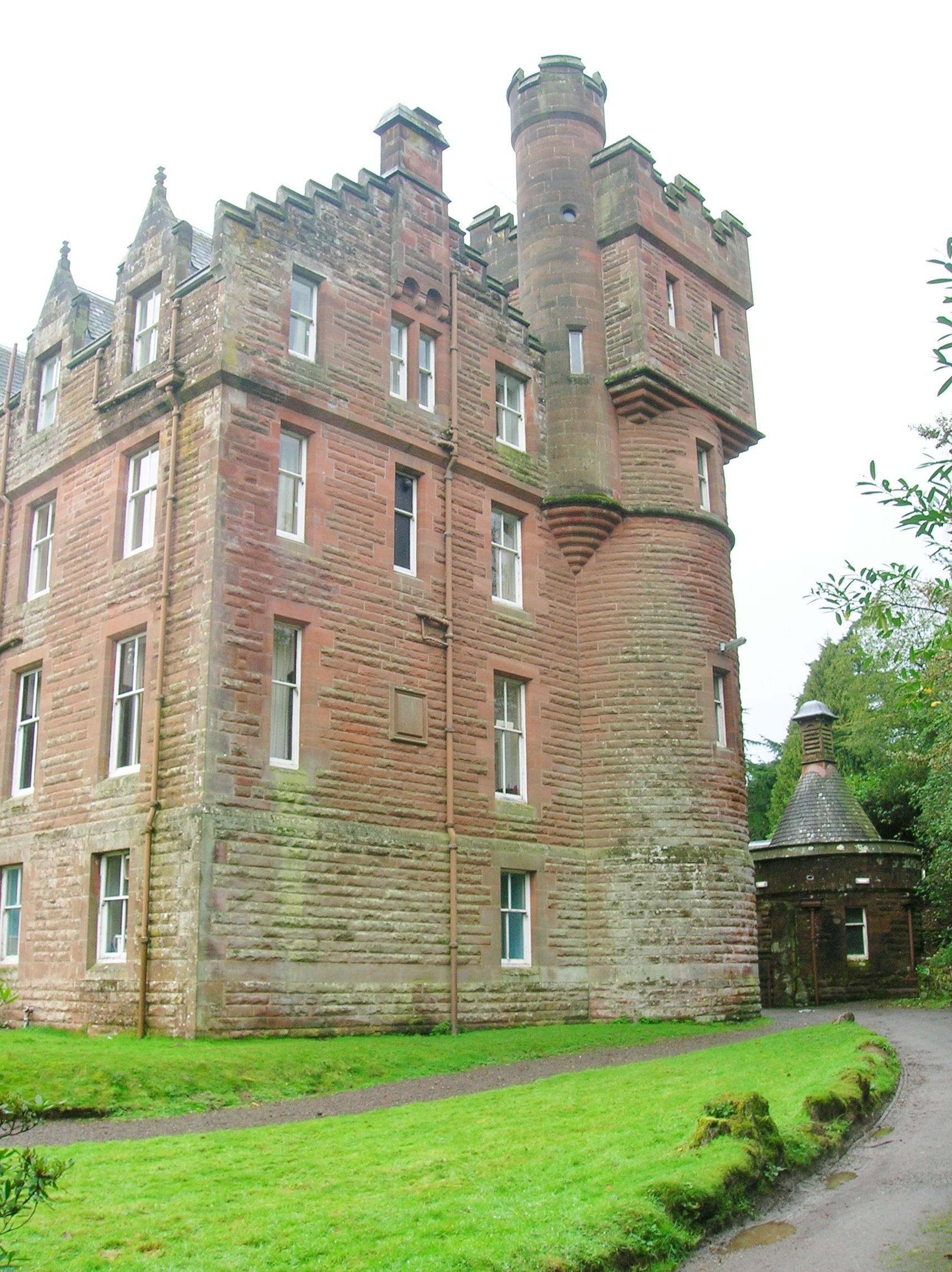
Friars Carse has a circular cap-house giving access to the roof of its tower

== See also ==
- Turret—a tower that projects vertically from the wall of a building
- Bartizan—an overhanging projection from the wall of a building
- Garret—an attic or top floor room in the military sense; a watchtower from the French word garite
