= Daugh Castle =

Coordinates: 57.5165°N 2.8256°W

Daugh Castle was a castle, about 5 miles (8.0 km) north of Huntly, Aberdeenshire, Scotland, near Cairnie Burn. It was also known as Castle of the Daach.

== History ==
The property is said to have belonged to Thomas Gordon, known as Tam o Riven (or Ruthven), a character for whom it is difficult to sort fact from the legend. It seems that Auchanachie Castle replaced Daugh Castle as the main residence in the 16th century.

== Structure ==
Daugh Castle can now be identified only by a natural mound north of the farm of Little Daugh. It may well have been a timber structure, which has disappeared, although the access road remains. The castle had a strong position with a wide view of lower Strathisla. The remains suggest the dimensions of the enclosure wall were about 180 feet (55 m) by 150 feet (46 m).

== See also ==
- Castles in Great Britain and Ireland
- List of castles in Scotland
