= Wardhouse Castle =

Scottish castle

Site information
- Owner: Clan Leslie
- Condition: Ruined

Location
- Coordinates: 57.348593°N 2.677951°W

Site history
- Built: 13th century
- Materials: Rubble

Wardhouse Castle was a 13th-century tower house, about 2.5 miles (4.0 km) west of Insch, Aberdeenshire, Scotland. The castle was called Weredors, Wardes Castle or simply Wardhouse.

== History ==
Sir Bartholomew the Fleming owned the property in the 13th century. The castle was in the lands of the John Erskine, Earl of Mar as feudal overlord in 1566, but the rents were used to pay royal trumpeters.

In the 16th century, the property belonged to the Leslies; the Gordons acquired it. It was in ruins by 1790, and demolished, along with a neighbouring building, shortly before 1842.

Clan member crest badge - Clan Leslie

Clan member crest badge - Clan Gordon

== Structure ==
Wardhouse Castle was an enclosure castle. Only ditches and earthworks remain. The building was very tall, with very thick walls which had a few slit windows. The lower storey was arched; the building was reached by a drawbridge. There was a moat. By the late 20th century all that was visible of the site, which had been degraded by ploughing, was a natural oval mound, mainly natural, which measured about 60 metres (200 ft) from south east to north west by 30 metres (98 ft), surrounded by mere traces of a ditch. Other than the north eastern flank the natural profile has been changed. cropmarks showed ditches of an outer line of defence, which have been located by excavation.

== See also ==
- Castles in Great Britain and Ireland
- List of castles in Scotland
