= Eden Castle =

Castle near Coylton, South Ayrshire, Scotland

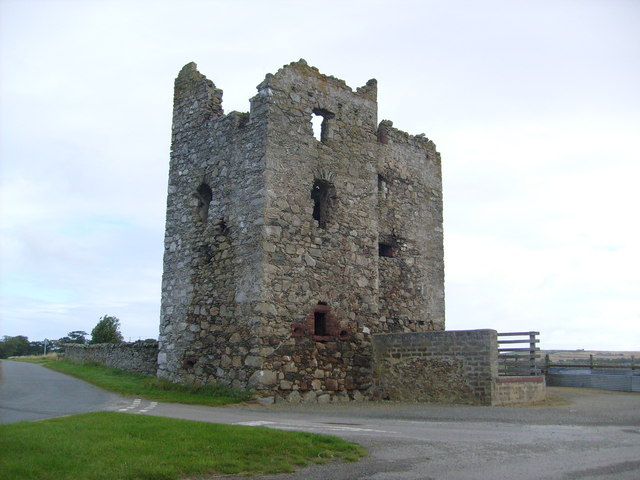
- Ruins in 2010
- Interactive map of Eden Castle
- 57.6180°N 2.5072°W
- Type: Castle
- OS grid reference: NJ698588

History
- Built: 16th century

Scheduled monument
- Official name: Eden Castle
- Type: Secular: tower
- Designated: 3 March 1993
- Reference no.: SM5638

Eden Castle is a castle near Banff in Aberdeenshire, Scotland.

The castle was built in the latter half of the 16th century by the Meldrum family with renovation and additional building carried out by George Leslie from 1676. From 1712, the castle was owned by William Duff, the Earl of Fife. Although largely ruined today, it formed a z-plan towerhouse with two towers at diagonally opposite corners of the main block.

The site has been designated a scheduled monument.
