= Robert Daun =

Dr Robert Daun FRSE FRCS (1785 – 1871) was a prominent figure in 19th century Scotland with a colourful life, ranging from being with the Scots Greys at the Battle of Waterloo to being elected a Fellow of the Royal Society of Edinburgh.

== Life ==
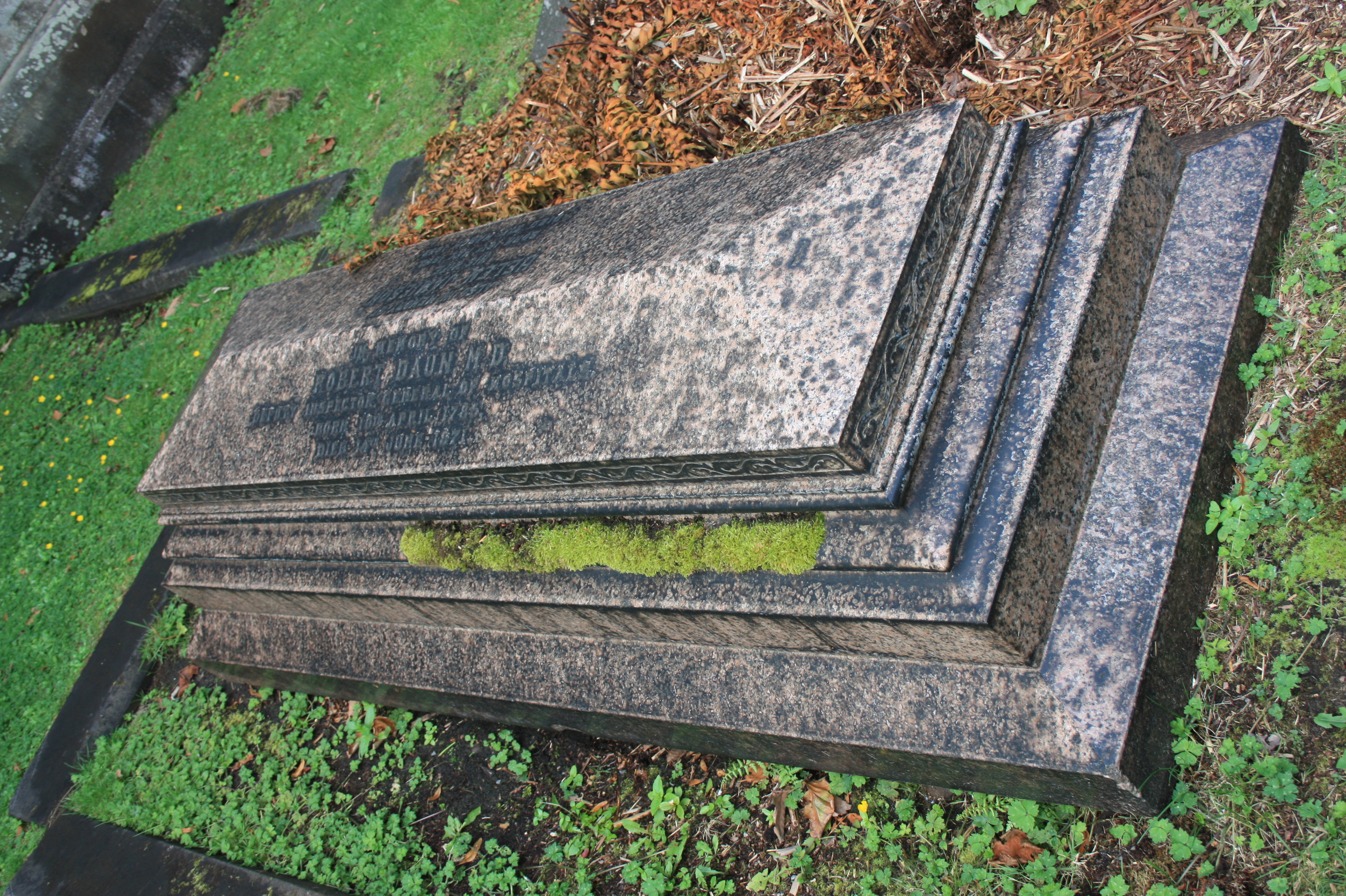
The grave of Robert Daun, Dean Cemetery, Edinburgh

He was born in Insch in Aberdeenshire the eldest son of Rev George Daun (1750-1821), the local minister, on 16 April 1785. He went to Elgin Grammar School and then studied medicine at King's College, Aberdeen graduating MA in 1803. Having sat the relevant medical exams in London, in 1804 he received a commission as Assistant Surgeon (aged only 19) in the army and travelled to India to work there, aiding in the Second Anglo-Maratha War. He served first with the 22nd Light Dragoons then the 59th Foot.

He returned to Britain around 1812 and received his MD degree from Aberdeen University in 1813. He was elected a Fellow of the Royal College of Physicians in 1814. He then joined the Scots Greys. This resulted in his being shipped with them to the Continent, and being with them at the Battle of Waterloo in June 1815. Whilst not on the front line, his position as Surgeon to the regiment would have rendered him an unenviable task, in this, one of history’s bloodiest battles. Thereafter he joined the occupying army in Paris following Napoleon’s defeat.

He thereafter resigned from the Scots Greys and returned to India in 1820 staying there until 1825. On return, he adopted a more sedate life, lecturing on both mathematics and theology. His great experience in the treatment of cholera led to him being employed as Deputy Inspector-General of Army Hospitals in Britain. In the cholera epidemic of 1831-2 he was sent to Sunderland to make studies and reports. He is noted as having saved at least two lives by the administration of saline injection: a then innovative idea in the treatment of cholera, conceived by Dr Thomas Latta of Leith.

He was nomadic by nature living in London 1832 to 1835, St Andrews 1835 to 1839 and Aberdeen 1839 to 1861. In 1832 he was elected a Member of the Geological Society of London "but did not have any special devotion to geology" being a mathematician by nature. Whilst in St Andrews, together with Robert Haldane and David Brewster, he was a founder of the St Andrews Literary and Philosophical Society in 1838.

He was elected a Fellow of the Royal Society of Edinburgh in 1840, his proposer being Henry Marshall. He resigned in 1845 but (rarely) was re-elected in 1867.

From 1861 onwards he lived in retirement at 6 Picardy Place at the head of Leith Walk in Edinburgh.

He died peacefully at home in Edinburgh on 14 June 1871, aged 86. He is buried in Dean Cemetery in west Edinburgh. His wife, Helen Jamieson (d.1892), lies with him. The grave lies midway alomh the "Lords Row" section on the west side of the cemetery.

== Family ==
Robert's brother, James Daun MA MD, also trained as a surgeon. He served as Rector of Westmoreland School in Jamaica.
