= Dee Castle =

Coordinates: 57.05820°N 2.93018°W

Dee Castle was a 15th-century castle, about 5 miles (8.0 km) east of Ballater, Aberdeenshire, Scotland, and south of the River Dee.

It may be known alternatively as Kinacoul Castle.

== History ==
Dee Castle is thought to be the ancient residence of the Gordons. It may have been erected as early as the mid-15th century, although another view is that it was built about 1602, burned in 1641, and allowed to fall into disrepair.

== Structure ==
A small portion of the castle may have been incorporated in a Roman Catholic chapel dated 1797, in its north-west angle. The chapel was out of use by 1898. It has since been converted into a private dwelling and it is thought that the west wall, which is 5 feet (1.5 m) thick, may have been part of the castle.

== See also ==
- Castles in Great Britain and Ireland
- List of castles in Aberdeenshire
