= Dumbreck Castle =

Castle in Aberdeenshire, Scotland

Coordinates: 57.3503°N 2.1707°W

Dumbreck Castle was a 16th-century tower house located around 3.5 miles (5.6 km) west of Ellon, in Aberdeenshire, Scotland.

Alternative names include Drumbeck Castle and Mains of Dumbreck.

== History ==
The property was originally owned by the Dumbreck family, before passing to the Meldrum family, who built the castle.

== Structure ==
No standing remains of the property survive, although architectural fragments have been built into farm buildings. The left-hand part of a gun loop is incorporated into the east-north-east gable of the farmhouse, while a carved fragment of stone is set into the north wall of the farm outbuilding to its east.

For stylistic reasons it has been suggested that this was the work of Thomas Leper.
