= Westhall Castle =

Coordinates: 57.3292°N 2.5440°W

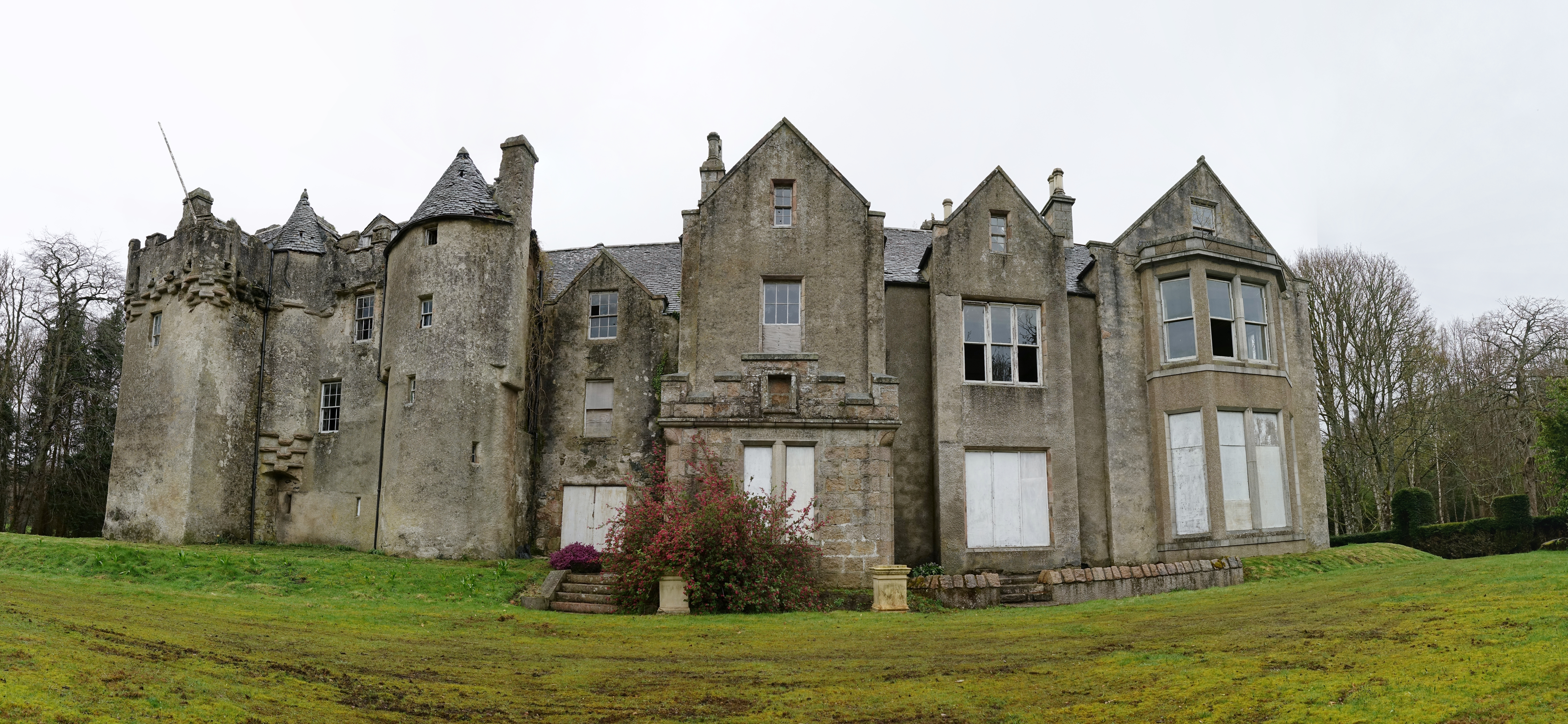
- The castle in 2024
- Interactive map of Westhall Castle

Westhall Castle, also known as Westhall House, is a country house located to the north of Oyne, in Aberdeenshire, Scotland. The house includes a 16th-century L-plan tower house, which was substantially extended in the 17th and 19th century. The house is a category A listed building.

== History ==
The estate was held by the Bishops of Aberdeen in the 13th century, and passed to the Gordons during the Reformation. The original L-plan tower was constructed in the 16th century, with a round tower added in the 17th century. In 1681, it was purchased by the Rev James Horne, vicar of Elgin. Further extensions were added around 1838. By the mid 19th century it was the property of Sir James Elphinstone, who invested in both the Aberdeen Canal Company and the Great North of Scotland Railway. Elphinstone, who lived at nearby Logie House, represented Portsmouth in the House of Commons between 1857 and 1880.

Westhall was later used as an agricultural school, and as a hotel which closed in the 1990s. A period of neglect followed, during which the house was sold several times and was placed on the Buildings at Risk Register for Scotland. In 2011, new owners took over the house, and its condition is described as "semi-derelict, but stabilised".
