= Auchanachie Castle =

Castle in Aberdeenshire, Scotland

Coordinates: 57.5096°N 2.8385°W

Auchanachie Castle, also known as Achanachie Castle or Auchanachy Castle, is a tower house dating from the sixteenth century, 5 miles north-west of Huntly, Aberdeenshire, Scotland.

== History ==
Auchanachie Castle probably began as a tall tower, reduced in height when an extension was added in the 17th century. It was the home of the eldest son of the Gordons of Avochie. It passed to the second son of the fourth laird, whose family still own it. Part of it which has been modernised is still lived in.

== Structure ==
The tower now has three storeys, with a two-storey eastern extension at right angles. The doorway bears the date 1594. There is a large circular stair tower in the angle, and it has shot holes under the eaves, and arrow-slit windows.

There is a massive chimney stack on the east front, although the fireplace has been closed. By the chimney stack is a doorway with the inscription. FROM OVR ENEMIES DEFENDE VS O CHRIST. There is a vaulted basement; bosses carry the arms of Campbell, Fraser and Gordon. A step turnpike stair leads to the vaulted hall on the first floor, which is small.

The building has been renovated and harled. There is a 17th-century circular dovecot, also harled, in the grounds of the tower.

It is a category A listed building.

== See also ==
- Castles in Great Britain and Ireland
- List of castles in Scotland
