= Waterton Castle =

Scottish castle

Site information
- Condition: ruined

Location
- Coordinates: 57.36338°N 2.04655°W

Site history
- Built: 17th century
- Materials: rubble

Waterton Castle is a ruined 17th-century tower house, about 1 mile (1.6 km) east of Ellon, Aberdeenshire, Scotland, north of the River Ythan.

== History ==
The property was originally associated with Kinloss Abbey and was later held by the Knights Templar. Around 1560 it passed to the Bannermans, before coming into the possession of the Forbeses, who held it until at least 1770. It is suggested that the castle was built between 1630 and 1640.

In 1652 the Kennedys of Kermuck murdered John Forbes of Waterton.

== Structure ==
Only a vaulted basement remains; it measures 4.4 metres (14 ft) by 3.9 metres (13 ft), with walls 0.7 metres (2 ft 4 in) thick and up to about 3 metres (9.8 ft) high.

A sketch from 1770 shows the castle as a four-storey building comprising a central block with projecting east and west wings, each with crow-stepped gables.

A carved stone memorial plaque set into the inner south wall bears the inscription: "This stone marks the site of the ancient seat of the family of Forbes, Lairds of Waterton A.D. 1630 - 1770."

In 1844 a drinking horn was dug from the castle ruins; in 1863 it was donated to the National Museum of Antiquities of Scotland.

== See also ==
- Castles in Great Britain and Ireland
- List of castles in Scotland
