= Foveran Castle =

Castle in Scotland

Location
- Coordinates: 57.3095°N 2.0166°W

Site history
- Built: 12th or 13th century

Foveran Castle (or Turing's Tower) was a 12th or 13th-century castle, located about 4.5 miles (7.2 km) south east of Ellon, Aberdeenshire, Scotland, at Foveran and about 1 mile (1.6 km) west of the mouth of the River Ythan. Foveran House Hotel lies about 75 metres (246 ft) south east.

== History ==
The site was owned by the Turing family until the castle collapsed around 1720, after which it was acquired by the Forbes of Tolquhoun around 1750.

== Structure ==
There is no longer any trace of the castle. It appears that the arch over a spring, which was thought to have been at the base of the northern exterior wall, remained up until 1866.

== Tradition ==
Thomas the Rhymer is said to have prophesied:

When Turing's Tower falls to the land
Gladsmuir shall be near at hand;
When Turing's Tower falls to the sea,
Gladsmuir the next year shall be.

It is suggested that this relates to the Battle of Prestonpans, sometimes known as the Battle of Gladsmuir.

== See also ==
- Castles in Great Britain and Ireland
- List of castles in Scotland
