= Barholm Castle =

Tower house in Galloway, Scotland

Coordinates: 54.84899°N 4.30510°W

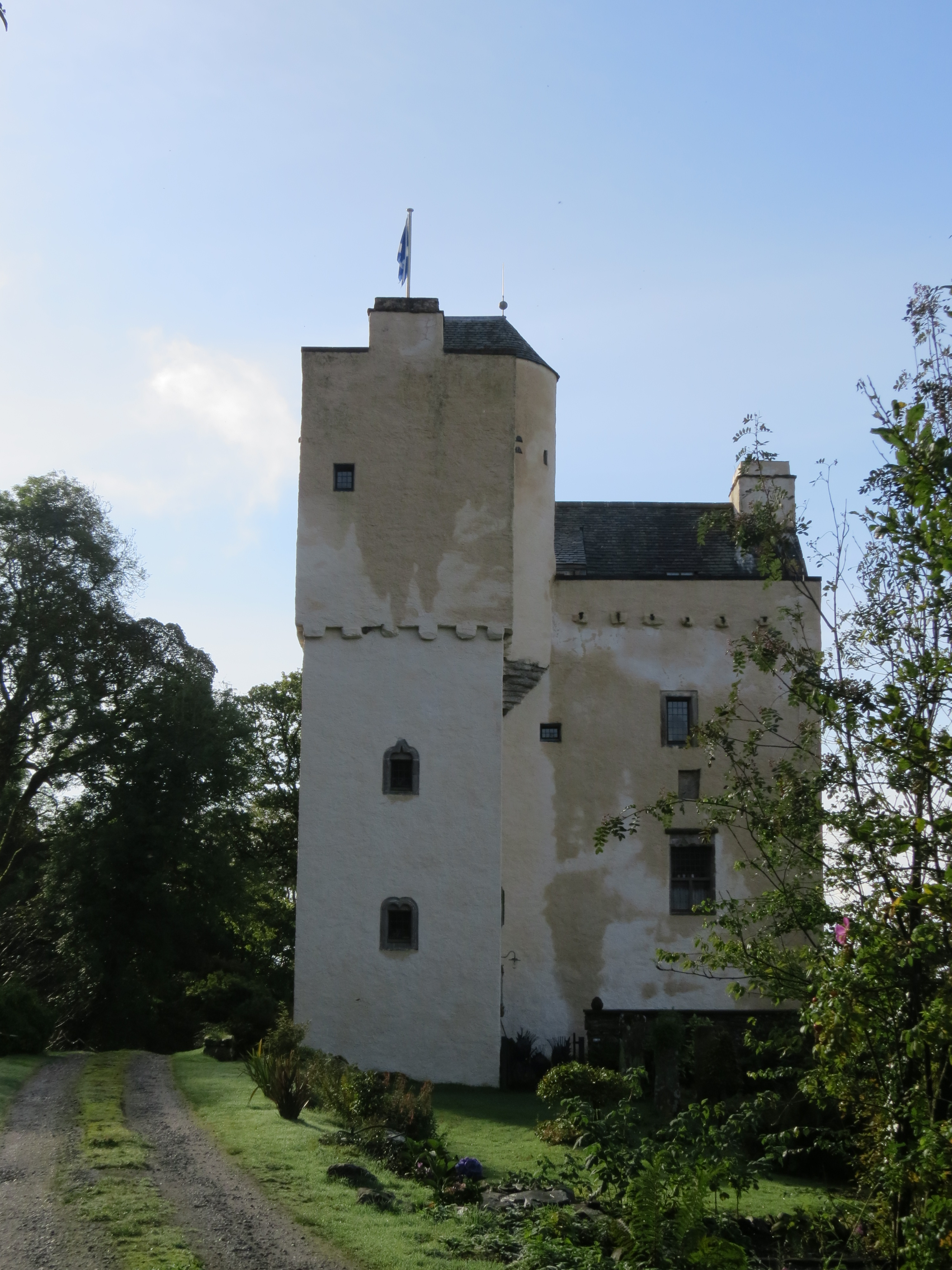
- The castle in 2019

General information
- Status: Restored, private residence
- Type: Tower house (L-plan)
- Classification: Category A listed building
- Location: 5 miles (8.0 km) south-west of Gatehouse of Fleet, Kirkcudbrightshire, Galloway, Scotland
- Years built: Late 15th century; rebuilt 16th–17th century
- Renovated: 2003–2006

Technical details
- Floor count: 3 storeys and a garret

Design and construction
- Designations: Category A listed building
- Known for: Former stronghold of the McCulloch family; associated with John Knox; possible inspiration for Ellangowan in Walter Scott's Guy Mannering

Renovating team
- Architects: Peter Drummond; Patrick Lorimer (ARP Lorimer and Associates)
- Renovating firm: ARP Lorimer and Associates
- Main contractor: Cumming & Co.

Barholm Castle is a tower house located 5 miles (8.0 km) south-west of Gatehouse of Fleet, in Kirkcudbrightshire, Galloway, Scotland. The tower dates back to the late 15th century, and it was a stronghold of a branch of the MacCulloch family. The present form of the castle dates from rebuilding in the 16th or 17th century, and in the early 2000s, it was restored from a roofless state to residential use. The tower is sometimes identified with the fictional Ellangowan, in Sir Walter Scott's Guy Mannering.

== History ==
The main block of the castle dates at least in part to the 15th century. A charter of 1541 was signed at Barholm. The stair tower is a late 16th-century addition, with a date stone of 1575, at which time the main block was rebuilt with a higher wall-head, and new parapet walk. A walled-up door in the east wall of the main block suggests a redesign of the accommodation.

Barholm was a stronghold of the McCullochs, who had owned the property since 1510. A strongly Protestant family, they feuded with the Catholic Browns of Carsluith Castle, only two miles to the north-west. Protestant preacher John Knox is said to have stayed here. In 1579, John Brown of Carsluith was charged to appear in court for the murder of McCulloch of Barholm, and was fined for his non-appearance. Major John McCulloch of Barholm was executed for his part in the Pentland Rising and the battle of Rullion Green in 1666.

The tower was replaced as the McCulloch residence in the late 18th century, when Robert Adam designed the classical Barholm House for the family near Creetown to the north. This house was destroyed by fire in the 1950s, by which time the tower had long since fallen into disrepair. Single-storey farm outbuildings had also been added on to the north of the tower. From 2003, following a grant from Historic Scotland, the tower was re-roofed and restored as a private house. Archaeological excavations were carried out before and during the works, between 2000 and 2005. Architects for the project were Peter Drummond and later Patrick Lorimer of ARP Lorimer and Associates, and the restoration work - completed in 2006 - was carried out by Cumming & Co., a Perth-based specialist restoration company. Since the restoration the tower house is no longer a scheduled monument, though it remains a category A listed building.

== The castle ==
The main block of the L-plan tower is of three storeys and a garret, with a vaulted basement at the lower level. The floor above was the hall, with a broad, hooded fireplace. The second floor was divided into two rooms. The small stair wing is a storey higher, with a cap-house at the top reached by a corbelled stair turret in the re-entrant angle. Narrow parapet walks run on the north and south walls. The main stair is a broad spiral which occupies the whole of the lower stair wing. The doors and windows have moulded surrounds, with a cable moulding, human faces and a grotesque head carved over the arched main door.

== See also ==
- Restoration of castles in Scotland
