= Inverey Castle =

Location
- Coordinates: 56.985658°N 3.501474°W

Site history
- Built: 16th century

Inverey Castle was a 17th-century tower house, about 4.5 miles (7.2 km) west of Braemar, Aberdeenshire, Scotland, near the meeting of the River Dee and the Ey Burn, at Inverey.

== History ==
The castle was burned in 1689, about fifty years after its construction.

Inverey belonged to John Farquharson of Inverey, who murdered John Gordon of Brackley, an event recorded in a ballad. Farquharson took part in the Jacobite rising of 1689, defeating an attack on Braemar Castle. Supposedly, he wished to be buried at Inverey and when buried instead at St Andrew's churchyard, Braemar, his coffin thrice resurfaced before that wish was granted.

Clan member crest badge - Clan Farquharson

== Structure ==
The castle was a plain oblong house; whether it was vaulted is disputed. A portion of the east wall survived until the mid-20th century. It was about 17 metres (56 ft) long, up to about 5.0 metres (16.4 ft) high, and about 0.9 metres (2 ft 11 in) thick. Reference to it as a “castle” may exaggerate its importance.

== See also ==
- Castles in Great Britain and Ireland
- List of castles in Scotland
