= Turriff (surname) =

Turriff is a surname. Notable people with the surname include:

- Alison Turriff (born 1984), Scottish musician
- John Gillanders Turriff (1855–1930), Canadian politician
