= Cobairdy Castle =

Coordinates: 57.4809°N 2.7088°W

Cobairdy Castle was a 16th-century tower house, about 4 miles (6.4 km) north-east of Huntly, Aberdeenshire, Scotland, west of Burn of Connairdy. It may have been built as early as 1500.

== History ==
The property belonged to the Murrays; it was transferred to the Burnetts.

It has been replaced by a 19th-century mansion of two storeys, Cobairdy House.

== Structure ==
There is no trace of the castle nor evidence of its structure.

== See also ==
- Castles in Great Britain and Ireland
- List of castles in Scotland
