= Freefield Castle =

Castle north of Inverurie, Aberdeenshire, Scotland

Location
- Coordinates: 57.3703°N 2.5388°W

Site history
- Built: 12th or 13th century

Freefield Castle was a castle, about 11.5 miles (18.5 km) north of Inverurie, Aberdeenshire, Scotland, and 1 mile (1.6 km) west of North Rayne.

It may also be known as Freefield or Treefield.

== History ==
The Leith family were the owners of the site. Leslie of Pitcaple killed George Leith of Freefield, starting a family feud.

== Structure ==
There is no longer any trace of the castle. Freefield House replaced it in 1754 (about 50 metres (160 ft) away), but it was shown on a map made by Gordon of Straloch in 1654.

== See also ==
- Castles in Great Britain and Ireland
- List of castles in Scotland
