= Dunnideer Castle =

Ruined tower house in Insch, Aberdeenshire, Scotland

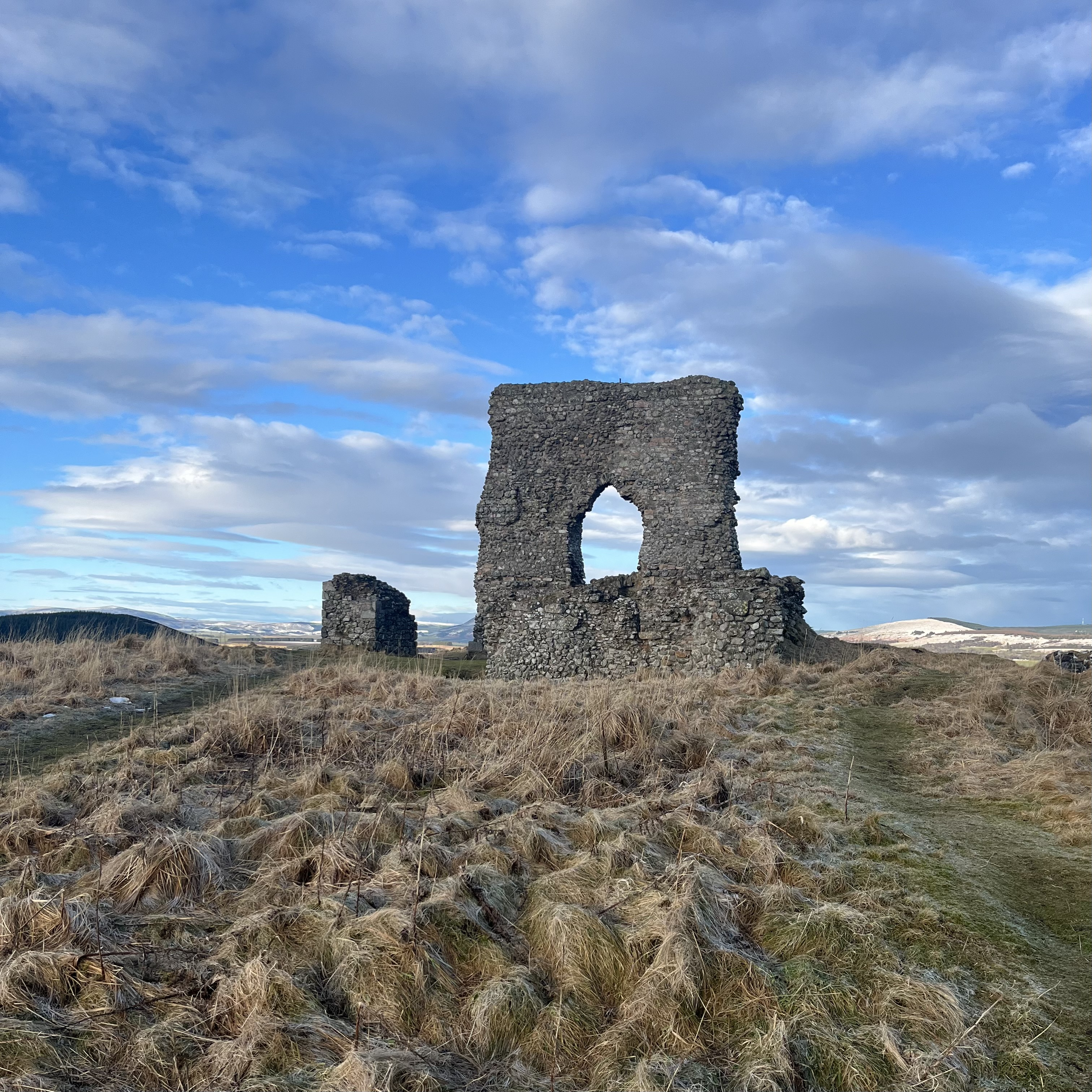
- Dunnideer Castle in February 2024
- Interactive map of Dunnideer Castle
- Type: Tower house within vitrified hillfort
- Location: Near Insch, Aberdeenshire, Scotland
- Coordinates: 57.342206°N 2.6454686°W
- Built: c. 1260 (tower house) c. 250 BC (hillfort)
- Governing body: Historic Environment Scotland

Scheduled monument
- Official name: Hill of Dunnideer
- Type: Prehistoric domestic and defensive: fort (includes hill fort and promontory fort); platform settlement, Secular: tower
- Designated: 5 October 1934
- Reference no.: SM95

Dunnideer Castle is a ruined tower house near Insch, Aberdeenshire, Scotland. Built around 1260, it reused stone from an earlier prehistoric vitrified hillfort dating to approximately 250 BC. The tower measured 15 by 12.5 metres (49 by 41 ft) with walls 1.9 metres (6.2 ft) thick, likely featuring a first-floor hall and multiple stories.

== History ==
The site's hillfort was excavated by archaeologist Murray Cook, revealing evidence of an Iron Age settlement later repurposed for medieval fortification. The castle itself, now a crumbling stone shell, is a scheduled monument managed by Historic Environment Scotland.

In 2024, the Insch Connection Museum unveiled a 1:150 scale model of the castle as it may have appeared in the 16th century, created by Clive Metcalfe - a founding member of Pink Floyd. The model, based on research by historian Dr Colin Harris, forms the centerpiece of the museum's exhibition, "The Castle of Dunnydure". The exhibition highlights the castle's significance as potentially the earliest tower house on mainland Scotland and its links to Sir John de Balliol, King of Scots (1292–1296).

== Current Status ==
The site remains open to the public, offering panoramic views of Aberdeenshire. The Insch Connection Museum continues to advocate for an on-site museum to display local artifacts.

== See also ==
- List of castles in Scotland
- Vitrified fort
