= Meldrum (surname) =

Meldrum is a surname, and may refer to:

- Andrew Meldrum (born 1951), American reporter
- Andrew Norman Meldrum (1876–1934), Scottish scientist
- Charles Meldrum (1821–1901), Scottish meteorologist
- Colin Meldrum (born 1975), Scottish footballer
- Courtney Meldrum (born 1977), American long-distance runner
- Fiona Meldrum, British chemistry professor
- Hamish Meldrum (born 1948), British doctor
- Ian Meldrum or Molly Meldrum (1943–2026), Australian media personality
- Jeffrey Meldrum (1958–2025), American anthropologist
- Sir John Meldrum (died 1645), Scottish soldier
- John W. Meldrum (died 1936), 1st U.S. Commissioner, Yellowstone National Park
- Keith Meldrum (20th century), British veterinarian
- Max Meldrum (1875–1955), Australian painter
- Michael Meldrum (born 1968), Canadian swimmer
- Michelle Meldrum (1968–2008), American guitarist
- Norman H. Meldrum (19th century), American politician
- Paul Meldrum (born 1960), Australian rules footballer
- Wendel Meldrum (1954–2021), Canadian actress
- William Meldrum (general) (1865–1964), New Zealand WWI general
