= Tillyhilt Castle =

Scottish castle

- Near Tarves, Aberdeenshire, Scotland

Site information
- Type: Tower house
- Condition: ruined

Location
- Coordinates: 57.37662676°N 2.242819508°W

Site history
- Built: 16th century

Tillyhilt Castle was a 16th-century tower house 6.5 miles (10.5 km) west of Ellon, 1 mile (1.6 km) northwest of Tarves, Aberdeenshire, Scotland.

== History ==
The castle was owned by the Gordons. John Gordon acquired the land in 1575, and it is thought that the castle was built sometime after this date. The site is classified by Canmore as a medieval castle.

== Structure ==
Only 9.0 metres (29.5 ft) of the west wall, to a maximum height of 0.7 metres (2 ft 4 in), remains, along with a turf-covered mound of rubble about 10.0 metres (32.8 ft) wide and about 1.0 metre (3 ft 3 in) high immediately to its east. Earlier evidence suggests the presence of two towers, and the building is thought not to have been more than 30 feet (9.1 m) long.

== See also ==
- Castles in Great Britain and Ireland
- List of castles in Scotland
