= Dorlaithers Castle =

Coordinates: 57.5169°N 2.4959°W

Dorlaithers Castle was a castle about 2.5 miles (4.0 km) south-west of Turriff, Aberdeenshire, Scotland at Dorlaithers, south of the burn of Gask. It may be known alternatively as North Darlaithers.

== History ==
No record of the construction of this castle remains.

== Structure ==
Early records suggest the castle was square; the site is now occupied by a farmhouse.

== See also ==
- Castles in Great Britain and Ireland
- List of castles in Scotland
