= Gairnieston Castle =

Medieval castle in Aberdeenshire, Scotland

Coordinates: 57.58449°N 2.4449°W

Gairnieston Castle or Garniston Castle was a medieval castle in Aberdeenshire, Scotland.

No traces of it remain.

== History ==
The castle was the seat of the chief of clan Dalgarno.

== Structure ==
The castle stood on the right bank of a stream. There is a small park which is believed to have been the castle garden.
