= Birse Castle =

Castle in Aberdeenshire, Scotland

Coordinates: 57°00′14″N 2°47′29″W

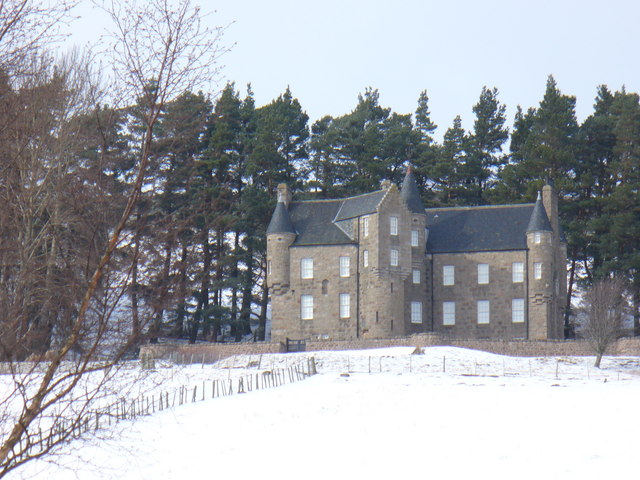
- Birse Castle in 2018
- Interactive map of the Birse Castle area

General information
- Location: Scotland

Birse Castle is located in the Forest of Birse, Aberdeenshire, Scotland. Originally a square tower house, it was rebuilt in the first decade of the 20th century into an L-plan structure. The 1930 addition of a new wing gave it a Z-plan. The building was designated a category B listed building in 1971.

== History ==
The Forest of Birse was originally a royal hunting forest that fell into the hands of the Bishop of Aberdeen. Sir William Gordon of Cluny feued the forest from the bishop in 1585 and built the tower house as a hunting lodge or summer retreat. Sir William Douglas of Glenbervie acquired the house in 1636 and it passed to Charles Gordon, 1st Earl of Aboyne, in 1666. By 1887 it was in ruins with only the north and east walls still standing. It was restored and enlarged with a new wing by George Bennett Mitchell for J. R. Heaven in 1905–1911. Another wing was added by Dr. William Kelly for Annie Pearson, Viscountess Cowdray in 1930.

The property is owned by Viscount Cowdry.

== Structure ==
The original tower house was a square, rubble-built, three storeys with attic tower house with turrets and a circular tower corbelled to square at the south-east corner. Mitchell added north and west wings to give it a L-shaped plan and added one-storey angle turrets on the corners. Kelly's 1930 addition added the east wing at the north end of the north wing to create the Z-plan. Very sympathetic to Mitchell's work, Kelly's angle turrets were slightly larger to add windows at the third-storey level and he added a one-storey northern extension and entrance. Above the main ground-floor entrance in the tower is a heraldic panel bearing a thistle, rose and crown. It is inscribed 19 AC 30 for the date and the owner's initials.
