= Turriff Castle =

Scottish castle

Site information
- Type: Tower house

Location
- Coordinates: 57.53860459°N 2.466076011°W

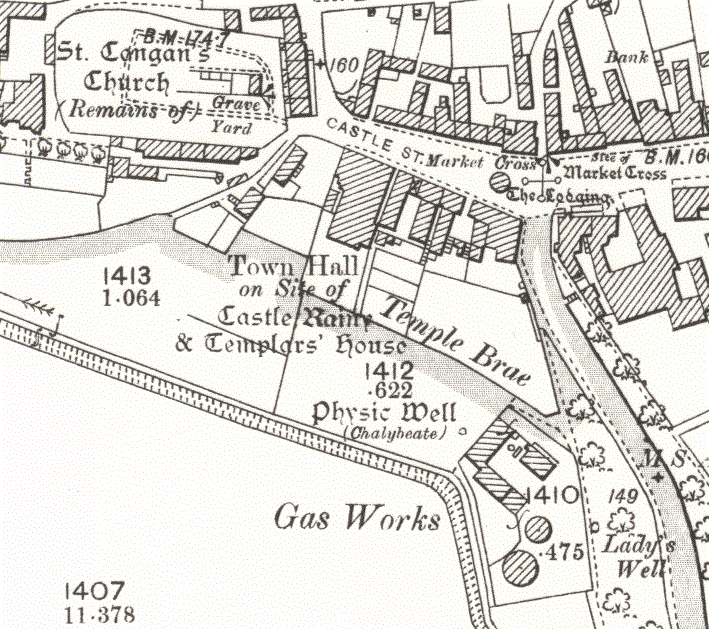
Turriff, Aberdeenshire - Ordnance Survey Map 1892-1914

Turriff Castle was a tower house in Turriff, Aberdeenshire, Scotland, located on Castlegate. It still existed in 1610 or 1612. The castle was also known as the Tower of Torrey.

== History ==
The castle stood in an area bounded by Castlehill, Mill Road, Gall Street and Deveron Street. A later building on or near the site was known as "Castle Rainy", and stood on the site of the Town Hall until it was cleared in the mid-19th century.

== Structure ==
Turriff Castle had a vaulted basement.

== See also ==
- Castles in Great Britain and Ireland
- List of castles in Scotland
