= Insch =

Village in Aberdeenshire, Scotland

Coordinates: 57.34102°N 2.61302°W

Insch: Scottish Gaelic: Innis Mo Bheathain
- Location within Aberdeenshire
- Population: 2,690 (2020)
- OS grid reference: NJ632280
- Council area: Aberdeenshire
- Lieutenancy area: Aberdeenshire
- Country: Scotland
- Sovereign state: United Kingdom
- Post town: INSCH
- Postcode district: AB52
- Dialling code: 01464
- Police: Scotland
- Fire: Scottish
- Ambulance: Scottish
- UK Parliament: Gordon and Buchan
- Scottish Parliament: Aberdeenshire West

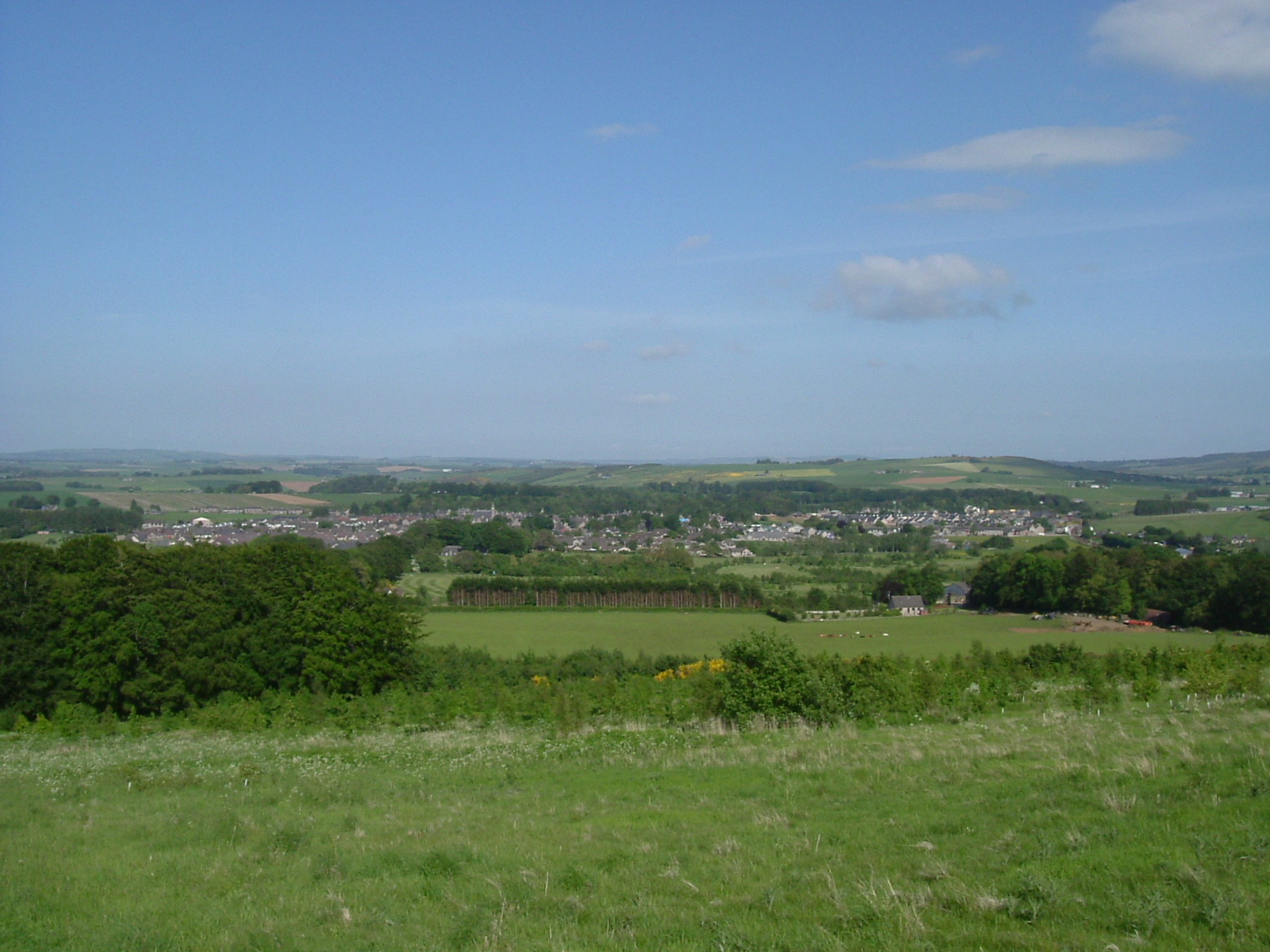
Insch viewed from the foot of Hill of Dunnideer

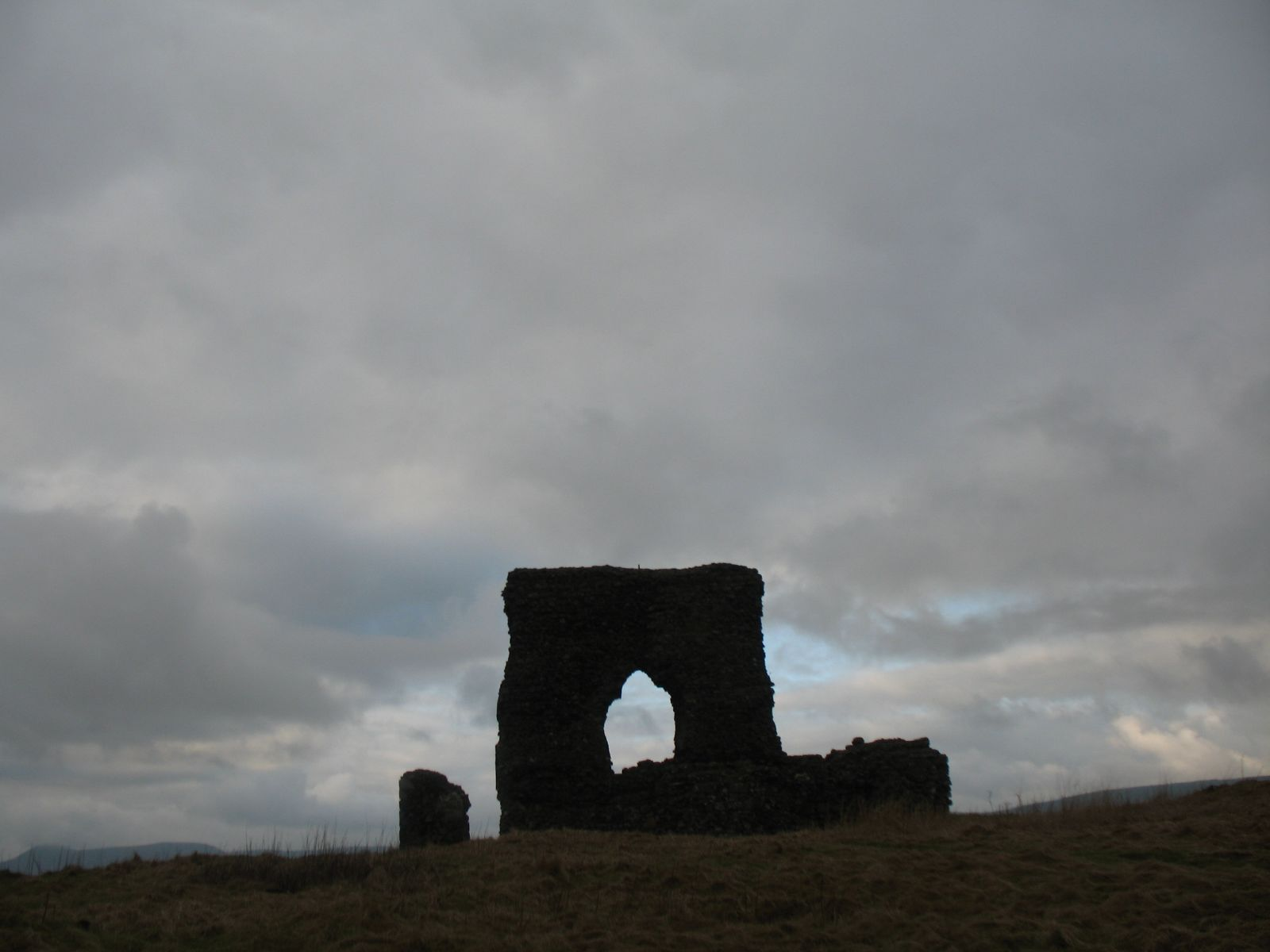
Dunnideer Castle, just outside Insch

Insch (Scottish Gaelic: An Innis or Innis Mo Bheathain) is a village in the Garioch, Aberdeenshire, Scotland. It is located approximately 28 miles (45 km) from the city of Aberdeen.

== History ==
Insch is home to the Pictish Picardy Stone, which is one of the oldest Pictish symbol stones and may date from the 7th century.

Dunnideer Castle was built in 1260 and is one of the earliest Tower Houses in Scotland which is still in existence.

In 1837, the Gazetteer of the British Isles described Insch parish as having a population of 8370, while the village held 1536 people.

== Etymology ==
The name of the village may have come from the Scottish Gaelic innis, meaning an island, or, as in this context, a piece of terra firma in a marsh. Alternatively, inch or innis can refer to a meadow or low-lying pasture which more closely corresponds with the site of the village.

Innis also indicates the presence of water - a river, loch or estuary, perhaps - often seen as Inch in place names, as in Perth's famous North and South Inches on the west bank of the River Tay. Inchnadamph at the eastern end of Loch Assynt and The Inch in southern Edinburgh are further examples. Innis can also be translated as haven or sanctuary - an island of safety from enemies or a resting place on the cattle drove.

== Facilities ==
Facilities include a post office, health centre, part-time fire station, leisure centre, golf course, bowling club, library, general and specialist shops, coffee shop and a community centre.

There are Church of Scotland and Scottish Episcopal churches.

Insch has two hotels, the Commercial Hotel and the Station Hotel. Some locals will offer bed and breakfast facilities in response to demand from migrant workers.

A number of small play-parks are scattered around the village, along with a larger play park and football pitch beside the leisure centre.

The village has a regular bus and train service, located on the main Aberdeen to Inverness train line. The village is served by Insch railway station and has regular bus services to Huntly and Inverurie with connections to Aberdeen and Inverness.

== Education ==
Within the village there is a nursery and the Insch Primary School. For secondary education, the pupils can attend The Gordon Schools in Huntly or Inverurie Academy in Inverurie.

=== Insch Golf Club ===
The game of golf in Insch was first recorded before World War I, with the course being laid around Dunnideer Hill. It was then moved to its present location around 1923 where it existed until 1940, when the ground was seconded by the War Department for use as a grenade range. Golf was absent in Insch until a committee was formed in 1977 to provide the village with such a facility. A nine-hole course was built by voluntary labour along Valentine Burn and was reopened for play in 1982. The club expanded further in 1987, when a clubhouse facility – complete with changing rooms, office, bar, café and dance floor – was provided from the remnants of temporary accommodation for a local school. The course was extended by the addition of 12 new holes on the slopes of Dunnideer.

== Sports Team ==
The local Football team are called Insch AFC and play at Recreation Park, Insch, they play in the Premier Division under the governing body Aberdeenshire Amateur Football Association (AAFA)

== Famous residents ==
The surgeon/adventurer Robert Daun FRSE (1785–1871) was born and raised here.

== Demographics ==
86% were born in Scotland, 10% in England and 4% elsewhere.
