= List of listed buildings in Cruden, Aberdeenshire =

This is a list of listed buildings in the parish of Cruden in Aberdeenshire, Scotland.

== List ==
Name	Location	Date listed	Grid ref.	Geo-coordinates	Notes	Category	LB number	Image
New Slains Castle, Cruden Bay		11 April 2018		57°24′55″N 1°49′57″W		B	52471	Upload another image
Nethermill, Disused. Grain Mill (Mr. Mackie)				57°25′15″N 1°51′57″W		B	3063	Upload Photo
Old Nethermill Bridge Over Water Of Cruden				57°25′14″N 1°51′56″W		C(S)	3064	Upload Photo
Aldie House				57°26′59″N 1°53′08″W		B	3068	Upload Photo
Slains Castle Drive, Bridge Over Water Of Cruden At Bridge House				57°25′04″N 1°50′45″W		B	3071	Upload Photo
St. James's Rectory (Now Chapel Hill)				57°24′40″N 1°52′49″W		C(S)	3061	Upload Photo
Auquarney House				57°25′57″N 1°57′47″W		B	3072	Upload Photo
Longhaven House Including Ancillary Buildings, Walled Garden, Boundary Walls And Gatepiers				57°26′17″N 1°50′07″W		B	49839	Upload Photo
St. James Episcopal Church, Chapel Hill				57°24′40″N 1°53′16″W		B	3060	Upload Photo
Old Bridge At Midmill Over Water Of Cruden				57°25′37″N 1°53′34″W		C(S)	3067	Upload Photo
Cruden Bay Bridge Over Water Of Cruden				57°25′00″N 1°51′05″W		C(S)	3069	Upload Photo
Bishop's Bridge Over Water Of Cruden				57°25′13″N 1°52′56″W		B	3059	Upload Photo
Auchiries School				57°25′52″N 1°52′25″W		B	3066	Upload Photo
Port Erroll Salmon Station, Icehouse				57°24′46″N 1°50′47″W		C(S)	3070	Upload Photo
Former Erroll School				57°24′47″N 1°52′35″W		B	3062	Upload Photo
Cruden Bay, Aulton Road, Former Golf Professional's Shop And Starting Box				57°24′47″N 1°51′47″W		C(S)	44724	Upload Photo
New Nethermill Bridge Over Water Of Cruden				57°25′15″N 1°51′46″W		C(S)	3065	Upload Photo
Bogbrae School				57°24′44″N 1°56′49″W		C(S)	3073	Upload Photo
Cruden Old Parish Church (St. Olaf)				57°25′10″N 1°53′03″W		B	3057	Upload another image
Cruden Old Parish Church, Graveyard				57°25′09″N 1°53′03″W		C(S)	3058	Upload Photo
Hay Farmhouse				57°24′05″N 1°52′23″W		C(S)	3074	Upload Photo

== Key ==
The scheme for classifying buildings in Scotland is:

- Category A: "buildings of national or international importance, either architectural or historic; or fine, little-altered examples of some particular period, style or building type."
- Category B: "buildings of regional or more than local importance; or major examples of some particular period, style or building type, which may have been altered."
- Category C: "buildings of local importance; lesser examples of any period, style, or building type, as originally constructed or moderately altered; and simple traditional buildings which group well with other listed buildings."

In March 2016 there were 47,288 listed buildings in Scotland. Of these, 8% were Category A, and 50% were Category B, with the remaining 42% being Category C.

== See also ==
- List of listed buildings in Aberdeenshire
