= St Olaf's Church (Cruden) =

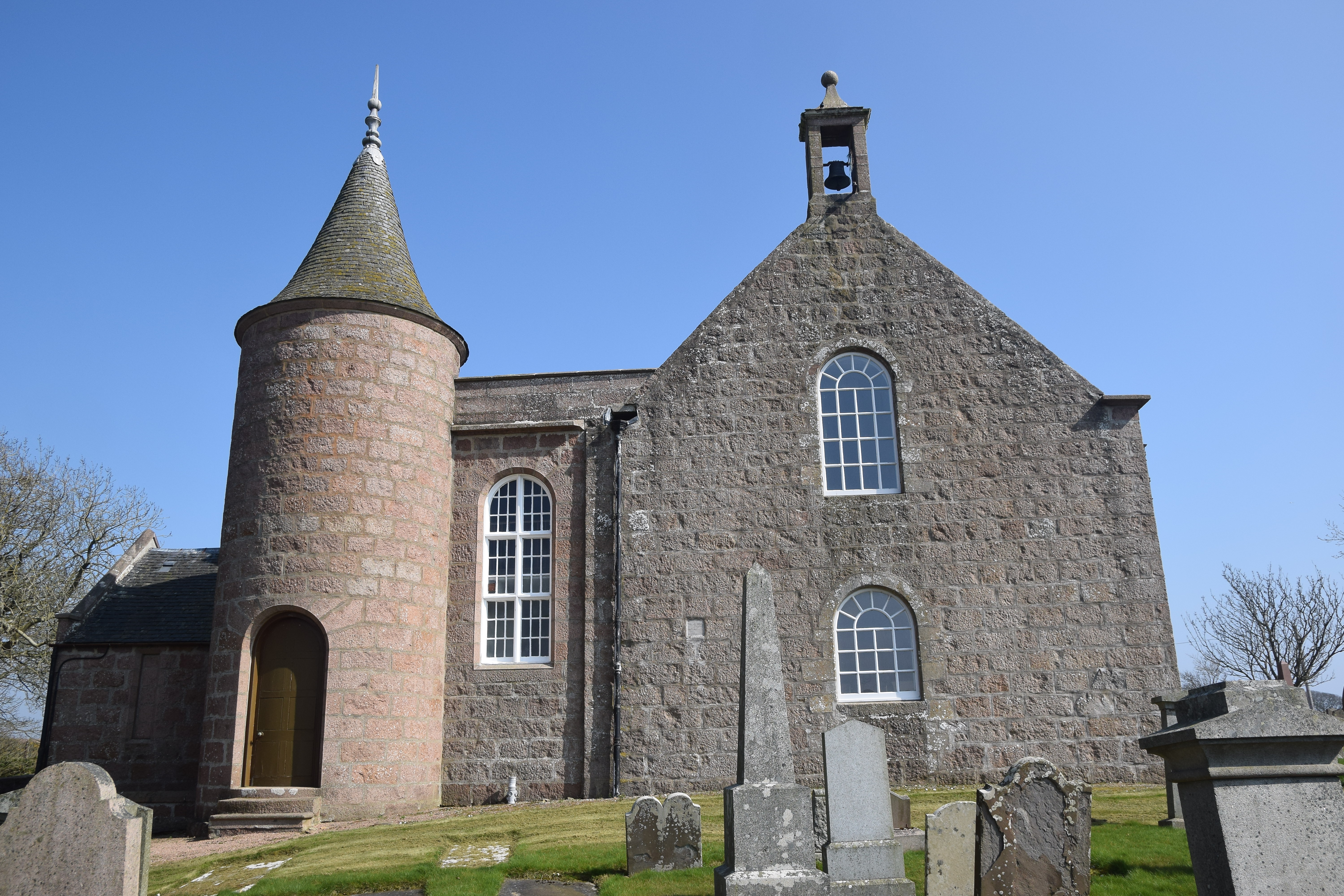
- The church, viewed from the west, in 2018

- Location within Aberdeenshire
- St Olaf's Church
- 57°25′10″N 1°53′03″W
- Denomination: Church of Scotland
- Website: http://www.crudenchurch.org.uk/

St Olaf's Church (also known as Old Parish Church) is a Category B listed building in Cruden, Aberdeenshire, Scotland, built in 1776. It was designated in 1971. It is a Church of Scotland parish church.

The church's twin conically roofed towers were added in 1833 by John Smith. According to historian Charles McKean, this "transformed this delightful church from an otherwise standard granite box kirk, customary birdcage bellcote topping the west gable, into a fantasy".

The interior retains the original 1834 pulpit, a 12th-century baptismal font, and a 1519 Dutch bell.

== Gallery ==
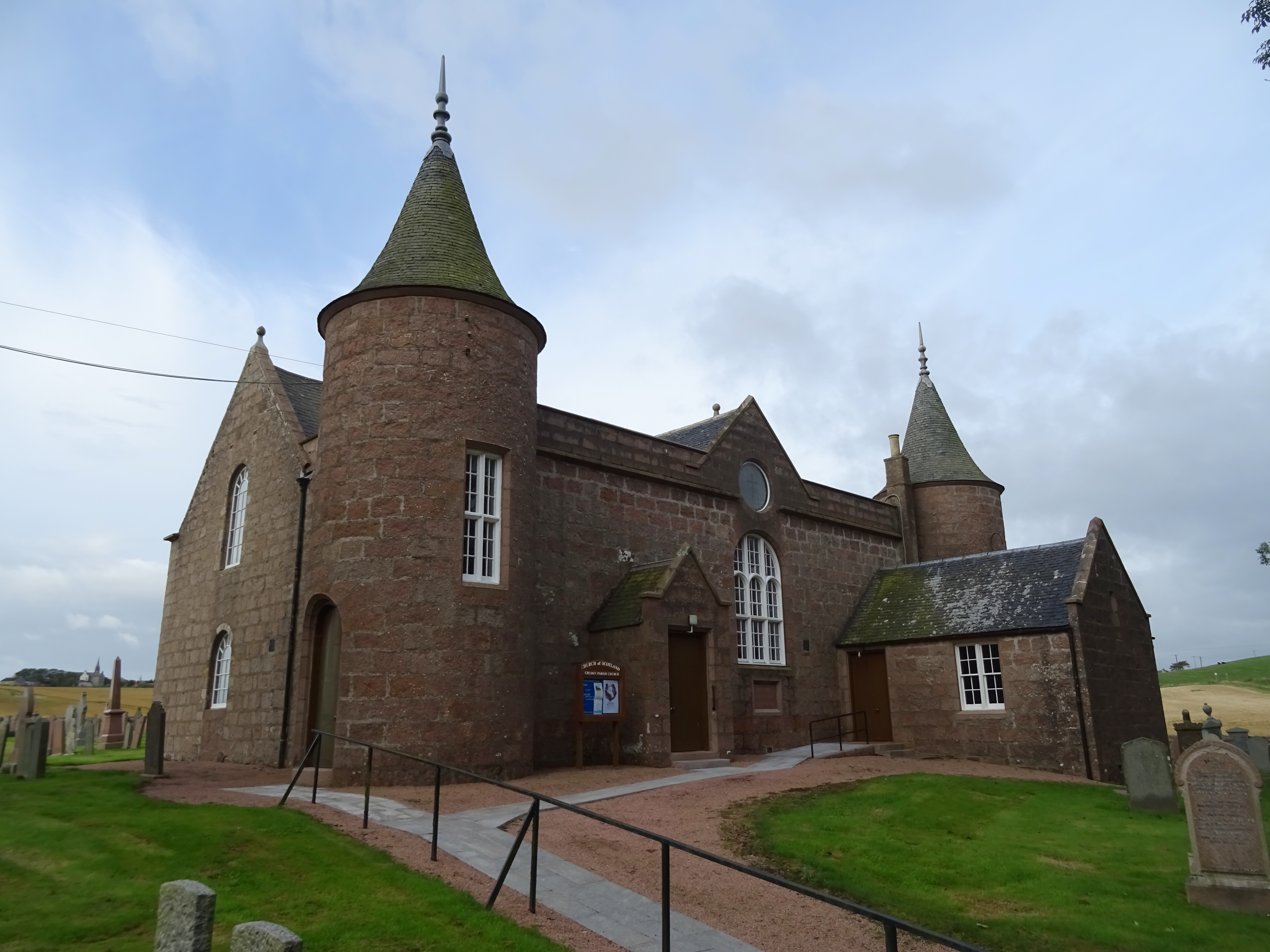
Northeastern corner

== See also ==
- List of listed buildings in Aberdeenshire
