= Alexander Napier =

Alexander Napier may refer to:

- Alexander Napier (1st Laird of Merchiston) (died c. 1454)
- Alexander Napier (2nd Laird of Merchiston) (died c. 1473)
- Alexander Napier, Lord Laurieston (c. 1578–1629)
- Several of the Napier baronets:
  - Sir Alexander Napier, ''de jure'' 4th Baronet (died 1702)
  - Sir Alexander Lennox Napier, 11th Baronet (1882–1954)
- Alex Napier (born 1935), Scottish footballer
