= Danderhall =

Coordinates: 55.913°N 3.106°W

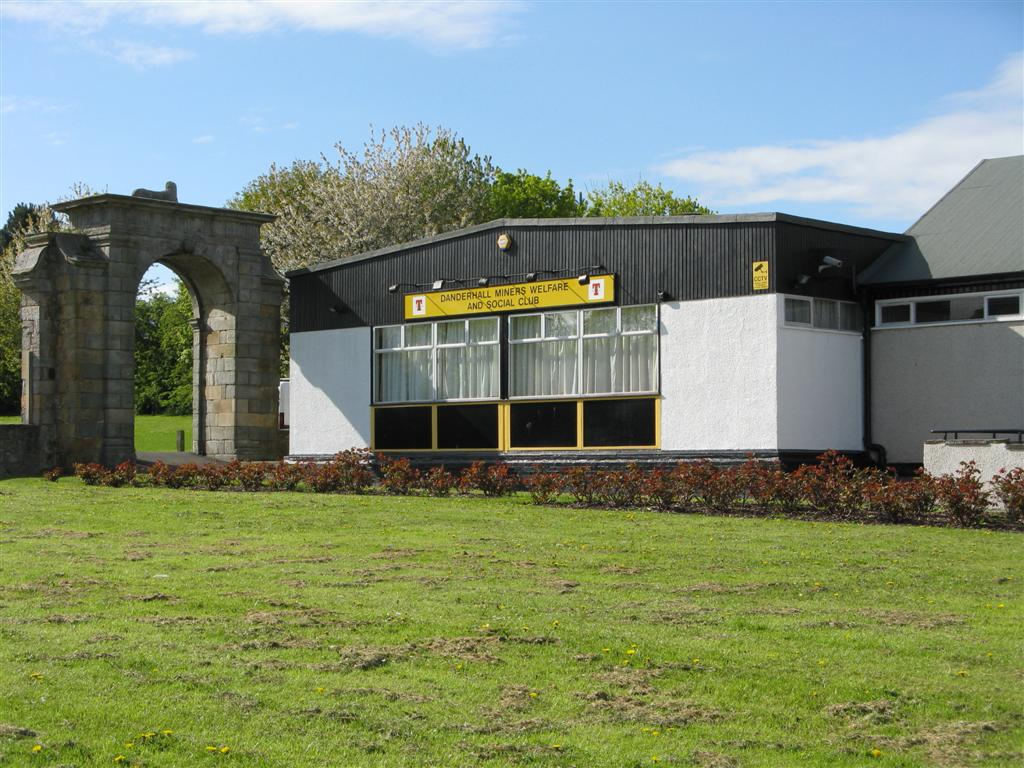
- Danderhall Miners Welfare and Social Club

- Location within Midlothian
- Population: 3,160 (2020)
- OS grid reference: NT308694
- Community council: Danderhall and District
- Council area: Midlothian
- Lieutenancy area: Midlothian
- Country: Scotland
- Sovereign state: United Kingdom
- Post town: DALKEITH
- Postcode district: EH22
- Dialling code: 0131
- Police: Scotland
- Fire: Scottish
- Ambulance: Scottish
- UK Parliament: Midlothian
- Scottish Parliament: Midlothian North and Musselburgh

Danderhall is a village in Midlothian, Scotland, just outside Edinburgh but inside the Edinburgh City Bypass.

== Overview ==
The village includes a large amount of council housing — although much of this is now privately owned by the occupiers. Danderhall was formerly a mining village, supplying labour for the nearby coal mines of Edmonstone to the northwest, Sheriffhall to the southeast, Woolmet to the east and Monktonhall beyond that. The latter was the last to remain open, but closed for good in 1998.

Danderhall is made up of 1,200 homes and a small number of shops. Danderhall also includes a library, primary school, two churches (a Church of Scotland and "Calvary Chapel of Edinburgh").

Notable people from Danderhall include: footballer Grant Brebner, now playing in Australia, former Hearts and Motherwell footballer Kevin Twaddle., Commonwealth Gold Medalist and triple World Champion David Peacock (bowls), former International darts player Rab Stewart and darts and autocross champion Blair Hamilton.

Danderhall and District is a Community Council area of Midlothian and is within the civil parish of Newton. In addition to Danderhall village, Danderhall Community Council area also takes in the area of Millerhill, Newton Village (not to be confused with Newtongrange), Hilltown and various farms. These are small residential areas and without shops and similar amenities, which are concentrated in nearby Danderhall.

The civil parish (Newton) has an area of 856 hectares (2,120 acres) and a population of 3,258 (in 2011).

== International relations ==
Danderhall is twinned with: Angres, Pas-de-Calais Hauts-de-France, France.

== Woolmet ==
Woolmet Hill is notable feature to the east of the road called The Wisp. On 3 April 1594, a battle known as the "Raid of Leith" was fought between the supporters of the rebel Francis Stewart, 5th Earl of Bothwell, who claimed the backing of Elizabeth I, and soldiers and cavalry led by Alexander, Lord Home for King James VI. Bothwell's force sheltered by Woolmet Hill and surprised Lord Home's force. Lord Home's foot soldiers retreated to Craigmillar Castle. Despite this initial victory, Bothwell encountered more royal troops and was forced to retreat from Edinburgh. The contemporary writer David Moysie, who described the fighting, calls the hill "Edmestoun eadge".

=== Woolmet House ===
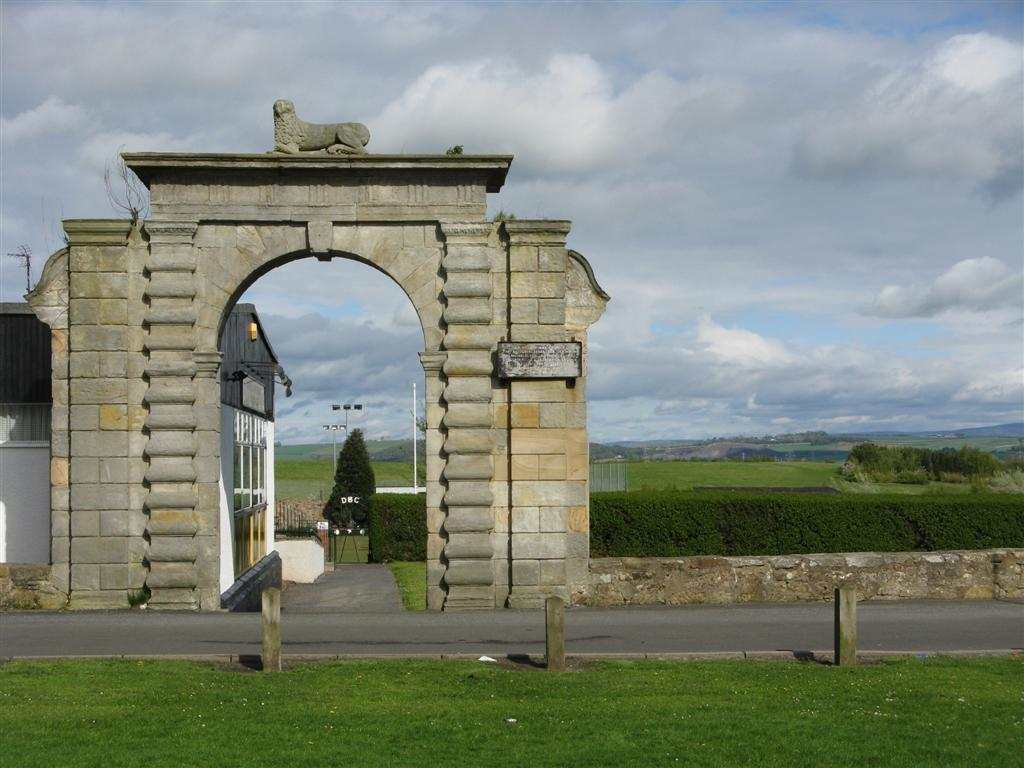
Gateway to Woolmet House.

Woolmet House was a large mansion built for Archibald Napier (1575–1600) around 1590 as a wedding present from his wealthy father Archibald Napier of Merchiston Castle (father of John Napier and of Alexander Napier, Lord Laurieston). It was demolished in the 1950s due to subsidence caused by Woolmet Colliery. Some carved stones from Woolmet were incorporated into the Castle of Mey around 1990.

All that remains is an ornamental doorway of around 1700, now attached to the modern Miners' Welfare Club.

=== Woolmet Colliery ===
The Colliery opened late in Scottish mining history (1898) and closed in 1966. It was operated by the Niddrie and Benhar Coal Company. It employed around 700 men and produced around 200,000 tons of coal per annum, under the control of Sir James Steel.

=== Edmonstone House ===
This mansion stood west of Woolmet House, north of Danderhall village. It was certainly extant in 1600 as home to the Edmonstone family. It was remodelled in the 18th century but demolished in the 1950s to avoid tax (the fate of many mansions in the 1950s). An entrance lodge and the base of the mansion still survive.

== Transport ==
Danderhall is served by Shawfair railway station on the Borders Railway.

Danderhall is on the A7 road inside the Edinburgh City Bypass. Just off the Bypass and south of Danderhall is the Sheriffhall park and ride, served regularly by Lothian Buses route 33 between Millerhill and Edinburgh (continuing to the western suburb of Wester Hailes). Danderhall is also served by half-hourly route 48 between Dalkeith and Musselburgh.
