= Lord Abbotshall =

Lord Abbotshall may refer to:

- Thomas Scott, Lord Abbotshall (died by 1541), Scottish judge, Lord Justice Clerk in 1536
- Andrew Ramsay, Lord Abbotshall (1619–1688), Scottish judge
