= Archibald Napier (landowner) =

Scottish landowner

- Born: 1534
- Died: 15 May 1608 (aged 74)
- Spouse(s): Janet Bothwell (d. 1563); Elizabeth Mowbray
- Children: 8, including John and Alexander
- Relatives: Richard Napier (nephew); Robert Napier (nephew)

Sir Archibald Napier (1534 – 15 May 1608) was a Scottish landowner and official, master of the Scottish mint and seventh Laird of Merchiston.

== Early life ==
He was eldest son of Alexander Napier, sixth of Merchiston, who was killed at the battle of Pinkie in 1547. His mother was Annabella, youngest daughter of Sir Duncan Campbell of Glenurchy. His paternal grandfather was Alexander Napier, 5th Laird of Merchiston, fifth of Merchiston, who was killed at the battle of Flodden in 1513. Archibald was infeft in the barony of Edenbellie as heir to his father on 8 November 1548, a royal dispensation enabling him, though a minor, to feudalise his right to his paternal barony in contemplation of his marriage with Janet Bothwell, which took place about 1549.

Napier began to clear his property of encumbrances. On 1 June 1555 he redeemed his lands of Gartnes, Stirlingshire, and others from Duncan Forester, and on 14 June 1558 he obtained a precept of sasine for infefting him in the lands of Blairwaddis, Isle of Inchcolm. In 1565 he received the order of knighthood.

According to Claude Nau, Napier had the reputation of being a wizard or magician and made bets that Mary, Queen of Scots would escape from Lochleven Castle. He sided with her when she gained her freedom. In 1569, William Stewart of Luthrie was accused of witchcraft and conspiracy against Regent Moray. He was said to have held meetings in the loft or upper chamber of Merchiston Tower with Napier to conjure a spirit called "Obirion". Stewart also made an invocation to summon Obirion in the "yaird" or garden at Merchiston.

During the siege of Edinburgh Castle, held by Kirkcaldy of Grange for the queen, he was required on 1 May 1572 to deliver up his house of Merchiston to the king's party, who placed in it a company of soldiers to prevent victuals being carried past it to the castle. On this account the defenders of the castle made an attempt to burn it, which was unsuccessful.

== Mining and the mint ==
Napier's name appears with others, including Regent Morton's favourite George Auchinleck of Balmanno and the Flemish miner Abraham Peterson, in a contract for working certain gold, silver, copper, and lead mines, for the space of twelve years, excluding lead mines managed by Morton's relative George Douglas of Parkhead. Refined silver and gold would be sold to the master of the mint, the "Maister Cunyeour" John Acheson.

Napier was appointed general of the cunzie-house (master of the Mint) in 1576, and on 25 April 1581 he was directed, with others, to take proceedings against John Acheson, the king's master-coiner. In May 1580 he received payment for the expenses of a mission to England. On 24 April 1582 he was named one of the assessors to prepare the matters to be submitted to the general assembly of the kirk of Scotland, and his name occurs in following years as an ordinary member of assembly, and also as acting on special commissions and deputations.

In March 1584 Edinburgh town council sold him a piece of land to extend his garden at Merchiston Tower.

On 6 March 1590 Napier was appointed one of a commission for putting Acts in force against the Jesuits. In January 1593 he was appointed by a convention of ministers in Edinburgh one of a deputation to wait on the king to urge him to more strenuous action against the Catholic nobles, and he was appointed one of a similar commission at a meeting of the general assembly of the kirk in April, and also by a convention held in October.

== Last years ==
On account of non-appearance before the council of his son Alexander, charged with a serious assault, Napier was on 2 July 1601 ordained to keep ward in Edinburgh until King James declared his will. In September 1604 he went to London to treat with English commissioners about the Mint, when, according to Sir James Balfour, he negotiated skillfully.

Napier continued till the end of his life to take an active part in matters connected with mining and the currency. He discussed samples of gold ore with the English prospector George Bowes in 1604. On 14 January 1608 he was appointed along with two others to repair to the mines in succession to try the quality of the ore. He died on 15 May 1608, aged 74.

== Family ==
By his first wife Janet (died 20 December 1563), only daughter of Francis Bothwell, lord of session, by his first wife Janet Richardson, Napier had two sons and one daughter:

- John Napier the scientist and mathematician who developed logarithms (1550 –1617)
- Francis Napier, appointed assayer to the cunzie-house 1 December 1581
- Janet Napier.

By his second wife, Elizabeth, daughter of John Mowbray of Barnbougle, Linlithgowshire, he had three sons and two daughters:

- Archibald Napier of Woolmet (1575-1600), ambushed and slain on 8 November 1600 in revenge for the murder of Scott of Bowhill in an argument over a horse, widowing his young wife Alison Edmonstone of Edmonstone House
- William Napier (1577-1622)
- Alexander Napier, Lord Laurieston (1578-1629), appointed a Senator of the College of Justice 14 February 1626
- Helene, married to Sir William Balfour
- Elizabeth, married, first, to James, lord Ogilvie of Airlie, and, secondly, to Alexander Auchmoutie, gentleman of his majesty's privy chamber.

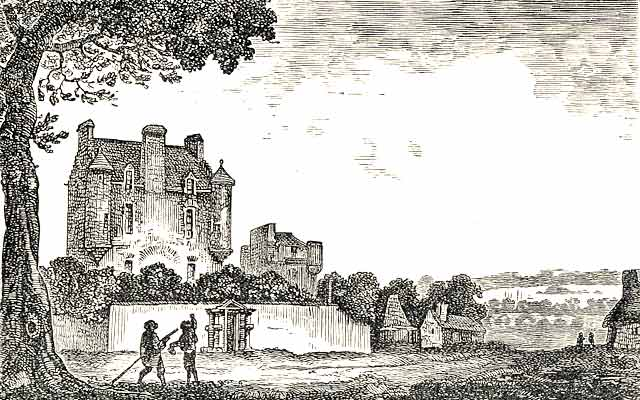
Lauriston Castle in 1775.

On 8 February 1588 the king granted to Napier, Elizabeth Mowbray, his second wife, and Alexander, their son and heir, the lands called the King's Meadow. On 16 November 1593 he obtained a grant of half the lands of the Lauriston estate, where he built the tower house that now forms part of Lauriston Castle.

== Notes ==
Attribution

This article incorporates text from a publication now in the public domain: "Napier, Archibald (1534-1608)". Dictionary of National Biography. London: Smith, Elder & Co. 1885–1900.
