= Alexander Napier, Lord Laurieston =

Scottish landowner and judge (c. 1578 – 1629)

Senator of the College of Justice
- In office February 1626 - ?

Personal details
- Born: c. 1578 Edinburgh, Scotland
- Died: 1629 (aged 50–51)
- Spouse: Mary Crawfurd
- Children: 3
- Parent: Archibald Napier (father)
- Relatives: John Napier (half-brother); Archibald Napier (nephew); John Mowbray (grandfather)

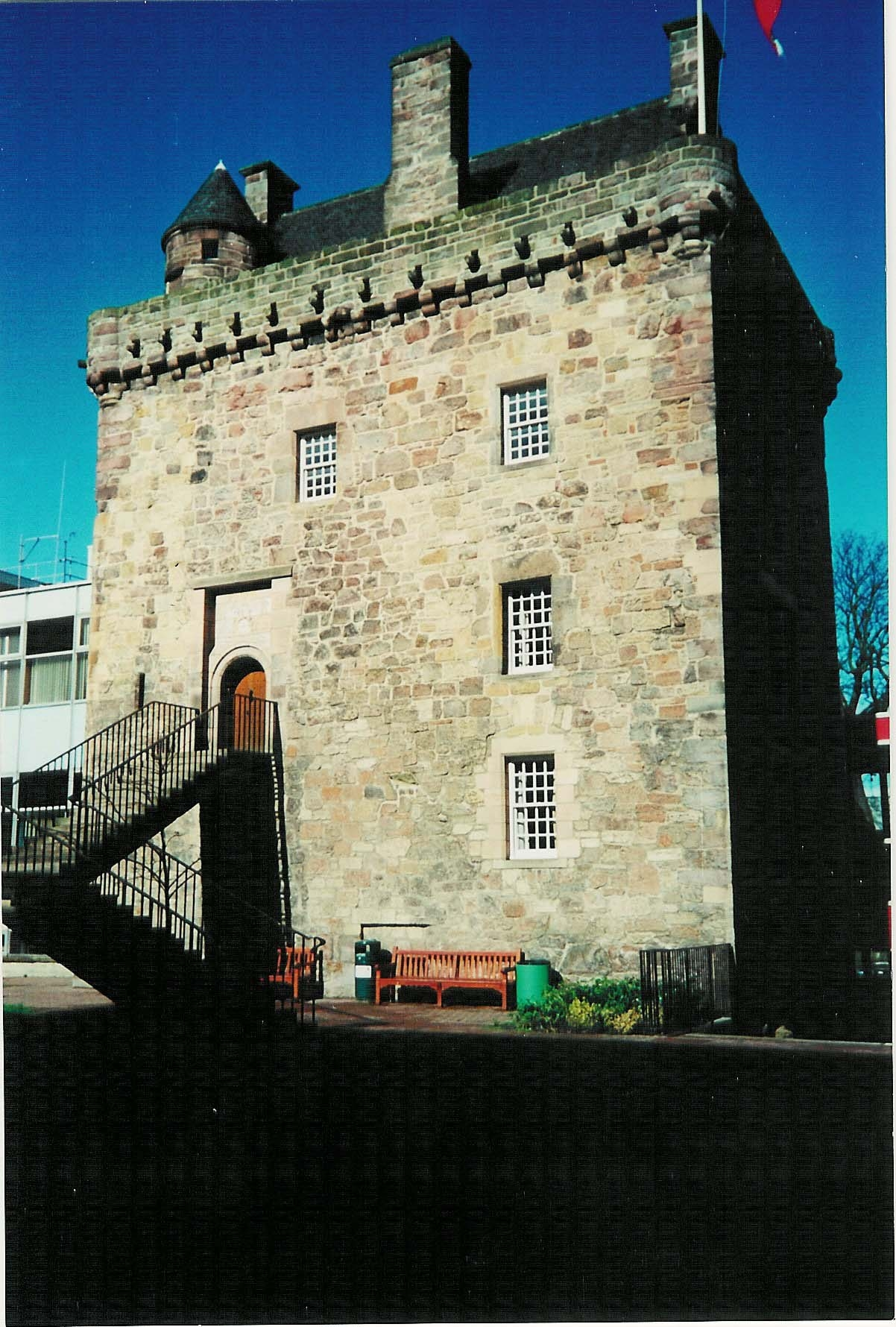
Merchiston Castle

Sir Alexander Napier, Lord Laurieston (c. 1578 – 1629) was a 17th-century Scottish landowner, judge and Senator of the College of Justice. He was half-brother of the mathematician John Napier.

== Life ==
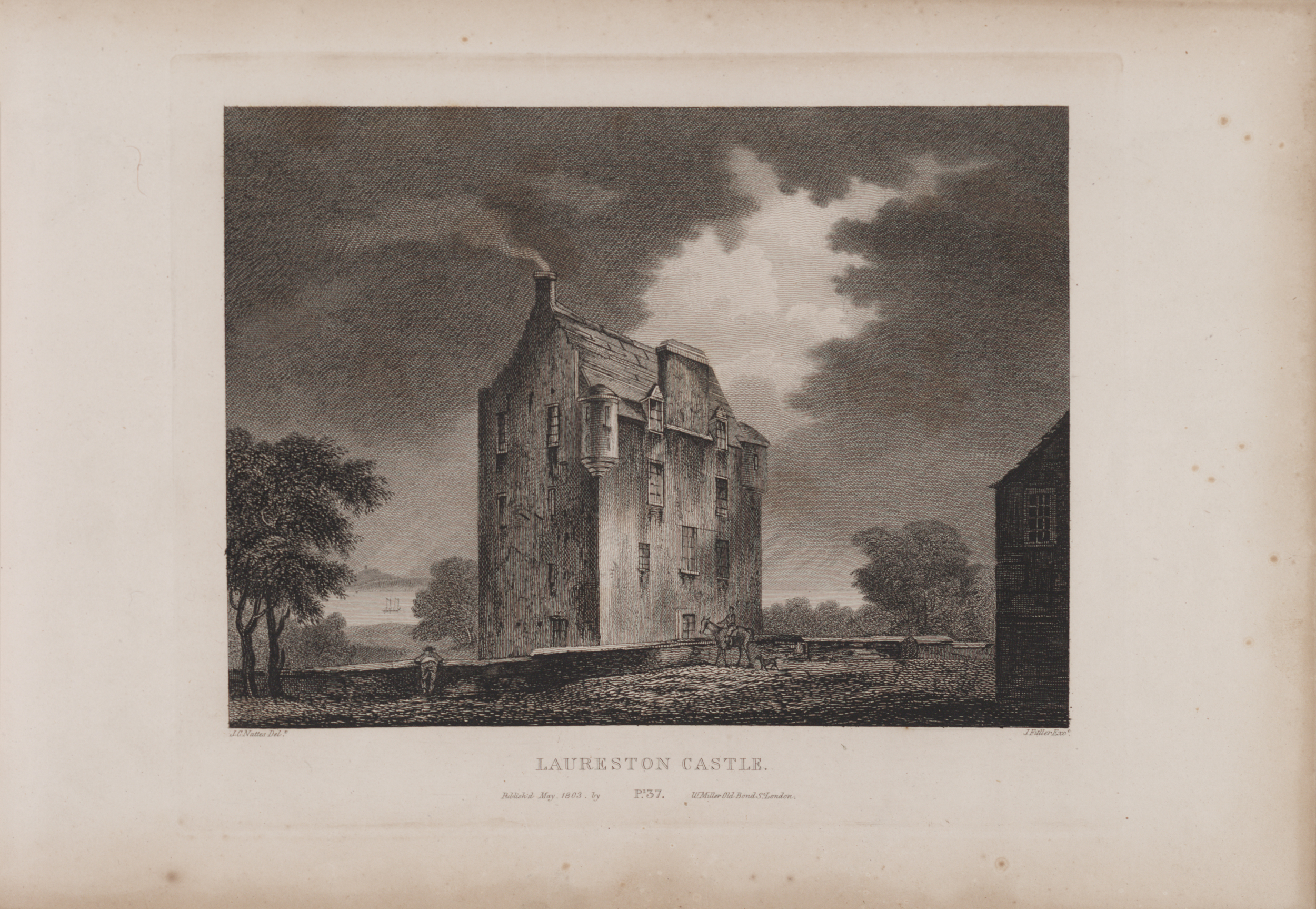
Lauriston Castle in the 17th century

He was born in Merchiston Castle the third son of the second marriage of Archibald Napier, 7th laird of Merchiston, and his wife, Elizabeth Mowbray, a daughter of John Mowbray of Barnbougle. He trained as a lawyer in nearby Edinburgh.

In 1617 he inherited substantial lands in a barony in Corstorphine from either a half-brother or uncle. In 1622 he inherited the lands and barony of Lauriston Castle close to Cramond (north-west of Edinburgh). However, he sold Lauriston to a John Cant in November of the same year.

In February 1626 he was elected a Senator of the College of Justice and took the title previously used by his father Lord Laurieston. He was also made Lord Justice Clerk.

He served on the Privy Council to King James VI.

He is often confused with his nephew Archibald Napier, 1st Lord Napier, son of John Napier, who was born at roughly the same time.

He died in 1629.

== Family ==
He married Mary (Elizabeth?) Crawfurd around 1600. They had three children, Alexander, Elizabeth and Margaret.

Following the death of Lord Lauriston his wife married Robert McAlexander of Crossclays (Crosskeys).

His sister Margaret married James Ogilvy, Lord Ogilvy and his sister Agnes married Sir Patrick Gray of Innergowrie.

== Property ==
Merchiston Castle still survives and forms the centrepiece to Napier University, named in honour of his family.

Lauriston Castle and its grounds are in control of the City of Edinburgh Council as a public park and museum.
