= Edinburgh (Parliament of Scotland constituency) =

Parliamentary constituency in Scotland

- Former constituency for the Parliament of Scotland

Former constituency
- Abolished: 1707
- Replaced by: Edinburgh

Edinburgh was a burgh constituency represented in the Parliament of Scotland and the Convention of the Estates to 1707.

== Burgh Commissioners ==
=== Parliaments of David II ===
- 1357 Alexander Gylyot
- 1357 Adam Tore
- 1357 Johnne Goldsmyth
- 1367 Adam of Bronhill
- 1367 Andro Bec

=== Parliaments of James II ===
- 1439 William of Cranstoun
- 1440 Lancelate of Abirnethy
- 1440 Williame Bully
- 1445 Johnne of Dalrimpill
- 1449 William of Cranstoun
- 1450 Williame of Libertoune
- 1456 Willyame of Cranstoun
- 1457-8 Williame of Libertoune
- 1457-8 Johnne of Dalrimpill
- 1457-8 Alexander Napier
- 1457-8 George of Fawla
- 1462 William Cranstoun
- 1463 Sir Alexander Napier
- 1463 William Cranstoun of Swynhop
- 1463 Lancelot Abirnethy
- 1463-4 Sir Alexander Napier
- 1463-4 William Cranstoun of Swynhop
- 1464 George Girnelaw
- 1464 Lancelot Abirnethy
- 1466 George Pennycuke
- 1467 Thomas Olifant
- 1467 Thomas Fokert
- 1467-8 Thomas Fokert
- 1467-8 Johne of Fauside

=== 1504–1707 ===
Parliament	Session	First member	First party	Second member	Second party
1504		Alexander Lauder of Blyth			
1524		Francis Bothwell			
1525		Francis Bothwell			
1526		Francis Bothwell			
1528		Francis Bothwell			
1531		Francis Bothwell			
1532		Francis Bothwell			
1535		Francis Bothwell			
1644	1	Sir John Smyth of Grottell (Provost)		Robert Mecklejohne	
1644	2	Sir John Smyth of Grottell (Provost)		Robert Mackeane	
1644	3	Sir John Smyth of Grottell (Provost)		Robert Mackeane	
1644	4	Sir John Smyth of Grottell (Provost)		Robert Mackeane	
1644	5	Sir John Smyth of Grottell (Provost)		Robert Mackeane	
1644	6	Edward Edyer		David Douglas	
1648	1	Archbald Sydserff (Merchant Burgess)		David Douglas	
1648	2	Sir James Stuart, of Kirkfeild (Provost)	Covenanter	James Borthuik	
1648	3	Sir James Stuart, of Kirkfeild (Provost)	Covenanter	James Borthuik	
1648	4	Sir James Stuart, of Kirkfeild (Provost)	Covenanter	James Borthuik	
1648	5	Sir James Stuart, of Kirkfeild (Provost)	Covenanter		
1648	6	Sir John Smyth of Grottell		James Monteith	
1648	7	Sir John Smyth of Grottell			
1648	8	Sir John Smyth of Grottell		Archbald Sydserff (Merchant Burgess)	
1654		Samuel Desborrow (Commissioner for the Revenues)		George Downing (Scout-Master-General)	
1656		Lord Broghill		Andrew Ramsay, Lord Abbotshall	
1659		John Tomfon Auditor General for Scotland			
1661	1	Sir Robert Murray, of Cameron		James Borthuik, Deacon of the Chirurgeons	
1661	2-3	Sir Robert Murray, of Cameron		Johne Milne, Vice Deacon of the Chirurgeons	
1665	-	Andrew Ramsay, Lord Abbotshall		John Somervell (Skinner)	
1667	-	Andrew Ramsay, Lord Abbotshall		John Somervell (Skinner)	
1669	1	Andrew Ramsay, Lord Abbotshall		Arthour Temple, of Ravelrig (Chirurgeon)	
1669	2-4	Andrew Ramsay, Lord Abbotshall		William Hamiltoun	
1678	-	Francis Kinloch, Lord Provost		Alexander Reid, Deacon of the Goldsmiths	
1681	-	Sir James Field, of Preistfield (Provost)		Edward Cleghorne (Goldsmith)	
1685	-	Sir George Drummond of Milnenab, provost		William Watson	
1689 (March)	1	Sir John Hall of Dunglass		George Stirling	
1689 (June)	1-4	Sir John Hall of Dunglass		George Stirling	
1689 (June)	5	Sir John Hall of Dunglass		Alexander Thomson	
1689 (June)	6-9	Sir Robert Cheislie		Alexander Thomson	
1689 (June)	10			Alexander Thomson	
1703	1-4	Sir Patrick Johnston	Court	Robert Inglis	
1707		Succeeded by the Westminster constituency Edinburgh			

== See also ==
- List of constituencies in the Parliament of Scotland at the time of the Union
