= Matthieu Cottière =

French Reformed pastor and theological writer

Matthieu Cottière (Cotterius) (1581–1656) was a French Reformed pastor at Tours and theological writer.

== Life ==
His parents were Simon Cottière or Couttière and Françoise Ribbe. He studied theology at Geneva to 1604, presenting a dissertation on justification. He then moved on to the University of Leiden, and took part in the series of debates on predestination and justification between Arminius and Gomarus.

Cottière became a pastor at Pringé in 1607. He was minister at Tours from 1617 to 1656. He was a Huguenot deputy at the national synod of Alais in 1620, where he defended the orthodoxy of the Albigensians, and at Charenton in 1631. He married Marguerite (or Marie) Amirault in 1624. They had eight children. A son Isaac also went into the church.

== Works ==
Cottière was a millennialist, who believed that the millennium had begun in the year 1517. He was a follower of John Napier, and an influence on Johann Heinrich Alsted. The Synopsis criticorum of Matthew Poole called him "vir doctus et acutus".

- Apocalypseos Domini Nostri Jesu Christi (1615). There was a letter of dedication to James I of England.
- Traittez des originales et versions (1619), against the Bible translation of Pierre Coton.
- Paradoxe, que l'Église romaine, en ce qu'elle a de différent des Églises dites réformées, n'est ancienne que de quatre cents ans environ (1636)
- Les propheties, touchant l'estat de la religion et de l'eglise des derniers temps (1637)
- L'Apocalypse, de nostre seigneur Jesus Christ (1642) This is a French translation of the 1615 Latin work. Included (subtitle) was a commentary on a 1641 work on the Apocalypse by the Jesuit Bernardin de Montreuil.
- Esclaircissement sur une principale controverse (1642)
- Les degrez de consanguinité et d'affinité (1644)
- De Hellenistis et lingua Hellenistica (1646). Opposed Daniel Heinsius, in the controversy he had with Salmasius over the nature of New Testament Greek.

A 1648 work Epistola ad Spanheimum, in the controversy over universal grace and Amyraldism, was answered by Friedrich Spanheim in Epistola ad Cottierum (1648).
