= Rabdology =

Device to aid arithmetic calculation, described by John Napier

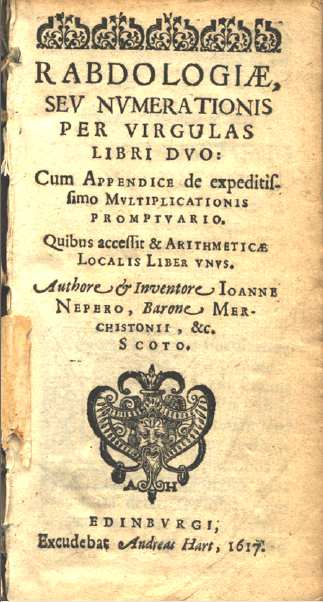
Cover page of Rabdologiæ

In 1617 a treatise in Latin titled Rabdologiæ and written by John Napier was published in Edinburgh. Printed three years after his treatise on the discovery of logarithms and in the same year as his death, it describes three devices to aid arithmetic calculations.

The devices themselves don't use logarithms, rather they are tools to reduce multiplication and division of natural numbers to simple addition and subtraction operations.

The first device, which by then was already popularly used and known as Napier's bones, was a set of rods inscribed with the multiplication table. Napier coined the word rabdology (from Greek ῥάβδος [rhabdos], rod and λόγoς [logos] calculation or reckoning) to describe this technique. The rods were used to multiply, divide and even find the square roots and cube roots of numbers.

The second device was a promptuary (Latin promptuarium meaning storehouse) and consisted of a large set of strips that could multiply multidigit numbers more easily than the bones. In combination with a table of reciprocals, it could also divide numbers.

The third device used a checkerboard like grid and counters moving on the board to perform binary arithmetic. Napier termed this technique location arithmetic from the way in which the locations of the counters on the board represented and computed numbers. Once a number is converted into a binary form, simple movements of counters on the grid could multiply, divide and even find square roots of numbers.

Of these devices, Napier's bones were the most popular and widely known. In fact, part of his motivation to publish the treatise was to establish credit for his invention of the technique. The bones were easy to manufacture and simple to use, and several variations on them were published and used for many years.

The promptuary was never widely used, perhaps because it was more complex to manufacture, and it took nearly as much time to lay out the strips to find the product of numbers as to find the answer with pen and paper.

Location arithmetic was an elegant insight into the simplicity of binary arithmetic, but remained a curiosity probably because it was never clear that the effort to convert numbers in and out of binary form was worth the trouble.

An interesting tidbit is this treatise contains the earliest written reference to the decimal point (though its usage would not come into general use for another century).

The computing devices in Rabdology were overshadowed by Napier's seminal work on logarithms as they proved more useful and more widely applicable. Nevertheless, these devices (as indeed are logarithms) are examples of Napier's ingenious attempts to discover easier ways to multiply, divide and find roots of numbers. Location arithmetic in particular foreshadowed the ease of and power of mechanizing binary arithmetic, but was never fully appreciated.
