= Alex Napier =

Scottish footballer

Personal information
- Full name: Alexander Stevenson Napier
- Date of birth: 8 August 1935
- Place of birth: Kirkcaldy, Scotland
- Position: Inside forward

Senior career*
Years	Team	Apps	(Gls)
- Dalkeith Thistle
1951–1955	Raith Rovers	1	(0)
1952–1953	→ Montrose (loan)	5	(1)
1955–1956	Darlington	1	(0)
1956–195?	Brechin City	2	(0)
- Nairn Thistle
- * Club domestic league appearances and goals

Alexander Stevenson Napier (born 8 August 1935) is a Scottish former footballer who played as an inside forward in the Scottish League for Raith Rovers, Montrose and Brechin City, and in the English Football League for Darlington.

Napier was born in Kirkcaldy in 1935. He played junior football for Dalkeith Thistle before joining Scottish League club Raith Rovers in February 1951. He joined Montrose on loan in February 1952, and remained with the club for the following season. He made one Division One appearance, on 14 November 1953 against Hearts at Tynecastle. When National Service commitments took him south of the border, he spent time with Darlington of the Football League Third Division North, for whom he made one first-team appearance, in a goalless draw with local rivals Hartlepools United on 17 December 1955. Napier signed for Brechin City in May 1956, and appeared twice in league competition before moving on to Nairn Thistle.
