= Merchiston Tower =

Castle in Edinburgh, Scotland

Coordinates: 55°56′0″N 3°12′50″W

Merchiston Castle
- Merchiston, in Edinburgh, Scotland; NT2417071800
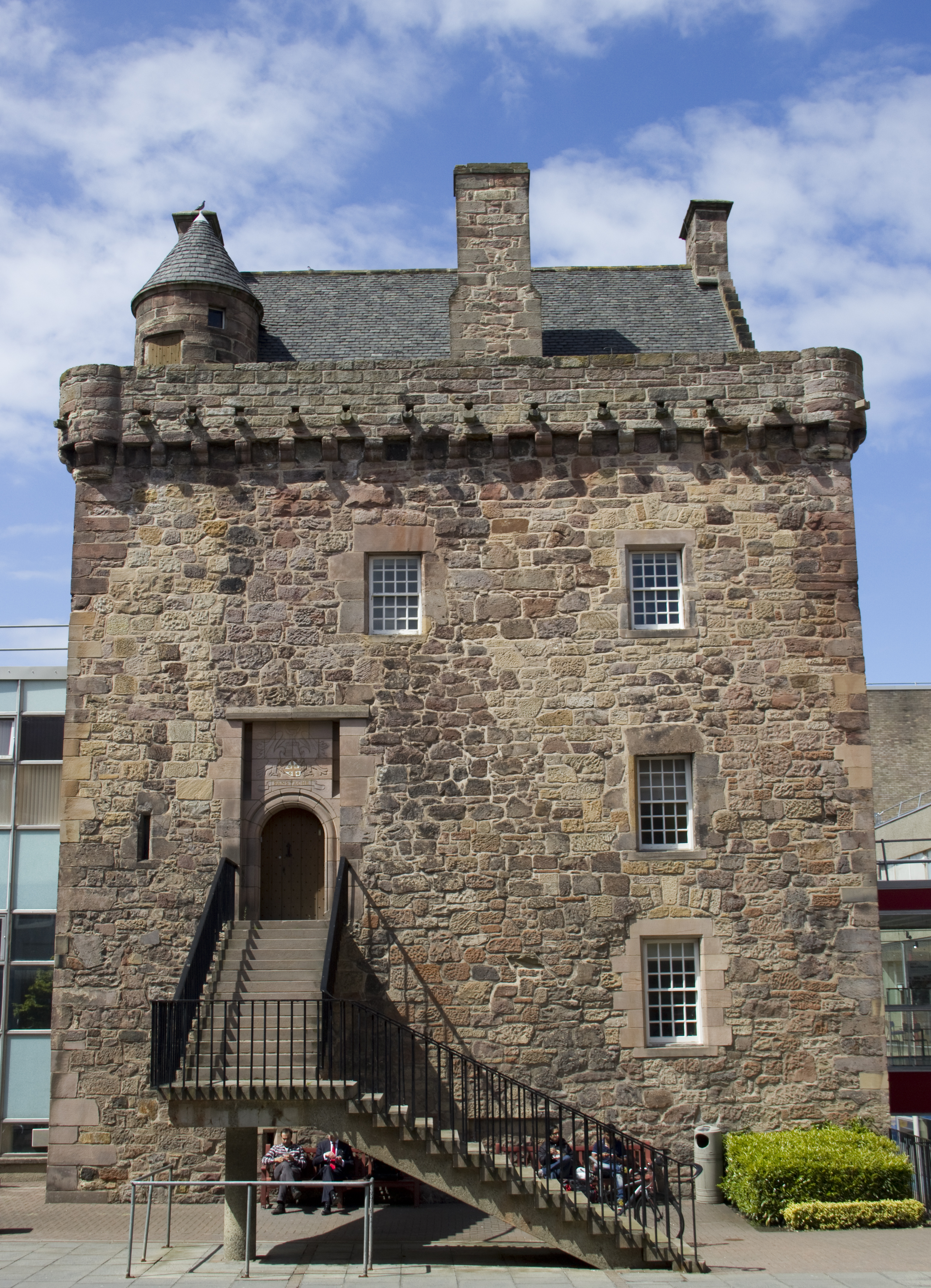
- Merchiston Castle in 2012

Site information
- Type: L-Plan tower house
- Owner: Napier University
- Open to the public: No

Site history
- Built: c. 1454
- Built by: probably Alexander Napier
- In use: 15th century to 21st century
- Materials: Stone

Merchiston Tower, also known as Merchiston Castle, was probably built by Alexander Napier, the 2nd Laird of Merchiston, around 1454. It serves as the seat for Clan Napier. It was the home of John Napier, the 8th Laird of Merchiston, and the inventor of logarithms, who was born there in 1550.

The tower stands at the centre of Edinburgh Napier University's Merchiston campus.

== History ==
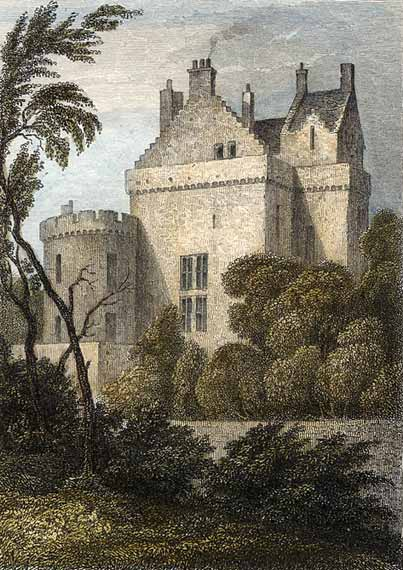
Merchiston Tower as it appeared in 1829, showing the addition to the front made by the Merchiston Castle School, which occupied it at that time.

The lands surrounding the castle were acquired before 1438 by Alexander Napier (1st Laird of Merchiston), and remained in the Napier family for most of the following five centuries.

Merchiston Castle was probably built as a country house, but its strategic position and the turbulent political situation required it to be heavily fortified – with some walls as much as six feet thick – and it was frequently under siege. During restoration in the 1960s, a 26-pound cannonball was found embedded in the Tower, thought to date from the struggle in 1572 between Mary, Queen of Scots, and supporters of her son, James VI.

In 1569, William Stewart of Luthrie was accused of witchcraft and conspiracy against Regent Moray. He was said to have held meetings in the loft or upper chamber of the Tower with Archibald Napier to conjure a spirit called "Obirion". Stewart also made an invocation to summon Obirion in the "yaird" or garden at Merchiston. In March 1584 Edinburgh town council sold Archibald Napier a piece of land to extend his garden.

In 1659, the castle was sold to Ninian Lowis, in whose family it remained until 1729, when it was sold to the governors of George Watson's Hospital (the Merchant Company of Edinburgh). The tower was reacquired by the Napier of Merchiston family when Francis Napier, 6th Lord Napier, bought it in 1752.

In 1772, a year before the sixth Lord's death, the Tower was sold to a relative, Charles Hope-Weir, second son of John Hope, 2nd Earl of Hopetoun. Weir sold it in 1775 to Robert Turner, a lawyer, who sold it in 1785 to Robert Blair, a professor of astronomy at the University of Edinburgh.

The Napier family again came into possession of Merchiston Castle in 1818, when it was purchased by William Napier, 9th Lord Napier.

In 1833, Lord Napier let the Tower to Charles Chalmers, who founded the Merchiston Castle School. It was sold outright to the school in 1914 by the Honourable John Scott Napier, fourteenth Laird of Merchiston (son of Francis Napier, 10th Lord Napier). The school vacated the building in 1930, moving to a site some three miles away.

In 1930 the property returned to the ownership of the Merchant Company, who used nearby playing fields for George Watson's College, which was soon itself to move nearby. Then in 1935 the tower passed to Edinburgh City Council. It remained unoccupied (except for war service) until 1956, when it was suggested as the centrepiece of a new technical college. Restoration work began in 1958, highlights of which were the discovery of the entrance drawbridge and the preservation of a seventeenth-century plaster ceiling.

It now stands at the centre of Edinburgh Napier University's Merchiston campus.

== Design ==
Images of Merchiston Tower as it appeared in 1883, after renovations done by the Merchiston Castle School.

The Tower is an interesting and elaborate example of the medieval tower house, being built on the familiar "L" plan with a wing projecting to the north. It was originally vaulted at the second floor and the roof. Among several remarkable features is the unusual elaboration of the main entrance, which is at the second floor level in the south front. The tall shallow recess in which the doorway is set undoubtedly housed a drawbridge which must have rested upon an outwork some 14 feet above ground level and 10 feet from the Tower.

Shortly after being let to Merchiston Castle School it was considerably altered with the addition of a castellated Gothic-style two-story extension (see picture) and a basement, which has since been removed.

Edinburgh Napier University has taken out large sections of wall on the northern extension to accommodate a corridor which runs through the Castle to other campus buildings.
