= Merchiston =

Area of Edinburgh, Scotland

Coordinates: 55.9365°N 3.2095°W

- Location within the City of Edinburgh council area Location within Scotland
- Population: Unknown
- OS grid reference: NT244721
- Council area: City of Edinburgh
- Country: Scotland
- Sovereign state: United Kingdom
- Post town: Edinburgh
- Postcode district: EH10
- Dialling code: 0131(337)
- Police: Scotland
- Fire: Scottish
- Ambulance: Scottish
- UK Parliament: Edinburgh South
- Scottish Parliament: Edinburgh Southern

Merchiston (/ˈmɜːrkɪstən/ MUR-kiss-tən) is a residential area around Merchiston Avenue in the south-west of Edinburgh, Scotland.

== Location ==
Merchiston Avenue is 1 1/4 miles (2 kilometres) southwest of the West End of Edinburgh's principal street, Princes Street. Other areas near Merchiston include Morningside to the southeast, Burghmuirhead (including Holy Corner and Church Hill) to the east and Bruntsfield to the northeast.

== History ==
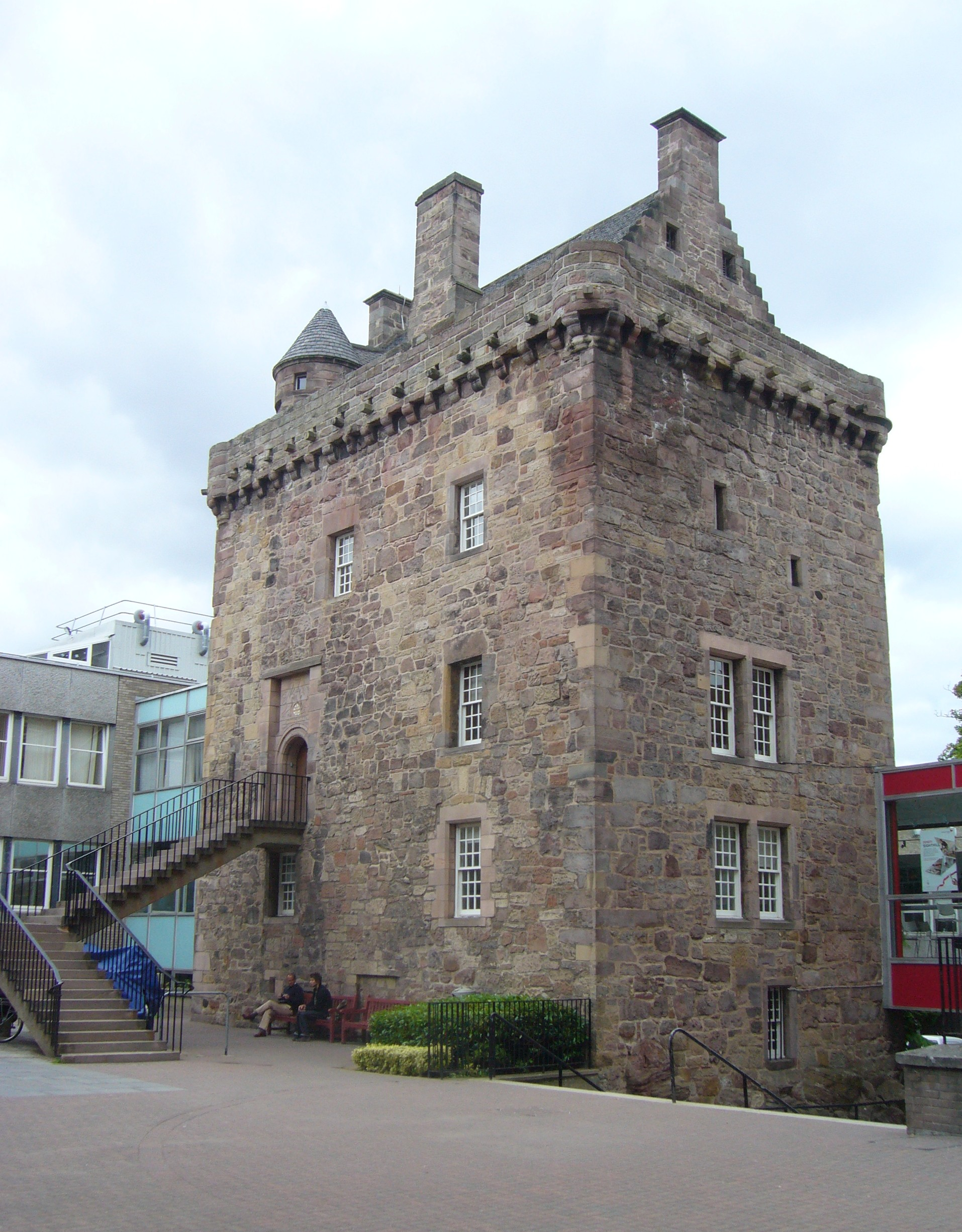
Merchiston Tower

The first known reference to Merchiston is found in the 1266 Exchequer Rolls of Scotland. At this point Merchiston consisted of one of a number of independently owned estates to the southwest of the Burgh Muir. Alexander Napier, a wealthy Edinburgh merchant and provost of the city, acquired the estate from King James I in 1436. He or his son, also Alexander Napier, were responsible for the construction of Merchiston Tower (or Castle) in the mid 15th century.

Merchiston Tower was later the home of John Napier, 8th Laird of Merchiston and the inventor of logarithms. The tower was sold by the Honourable John Scott Napier, 14th Laird of Merchiston, in 1914 to the Merchiston Castle School and today forms part of Edinburgh Napier University.

== Housing ==
The housing is primarily a mixture of large, late Georgian, Victorian and Edwardian villas – several of the latter by Edward Calvert – together with a smaller number of Victorian tenements and some relatively large, early-20th century villas. In recent years many of these villas have been subjected to development with blocks of flats being built in their once expansive gardens and the original houses themselves being divided into small numbers of flats.

== Education ==
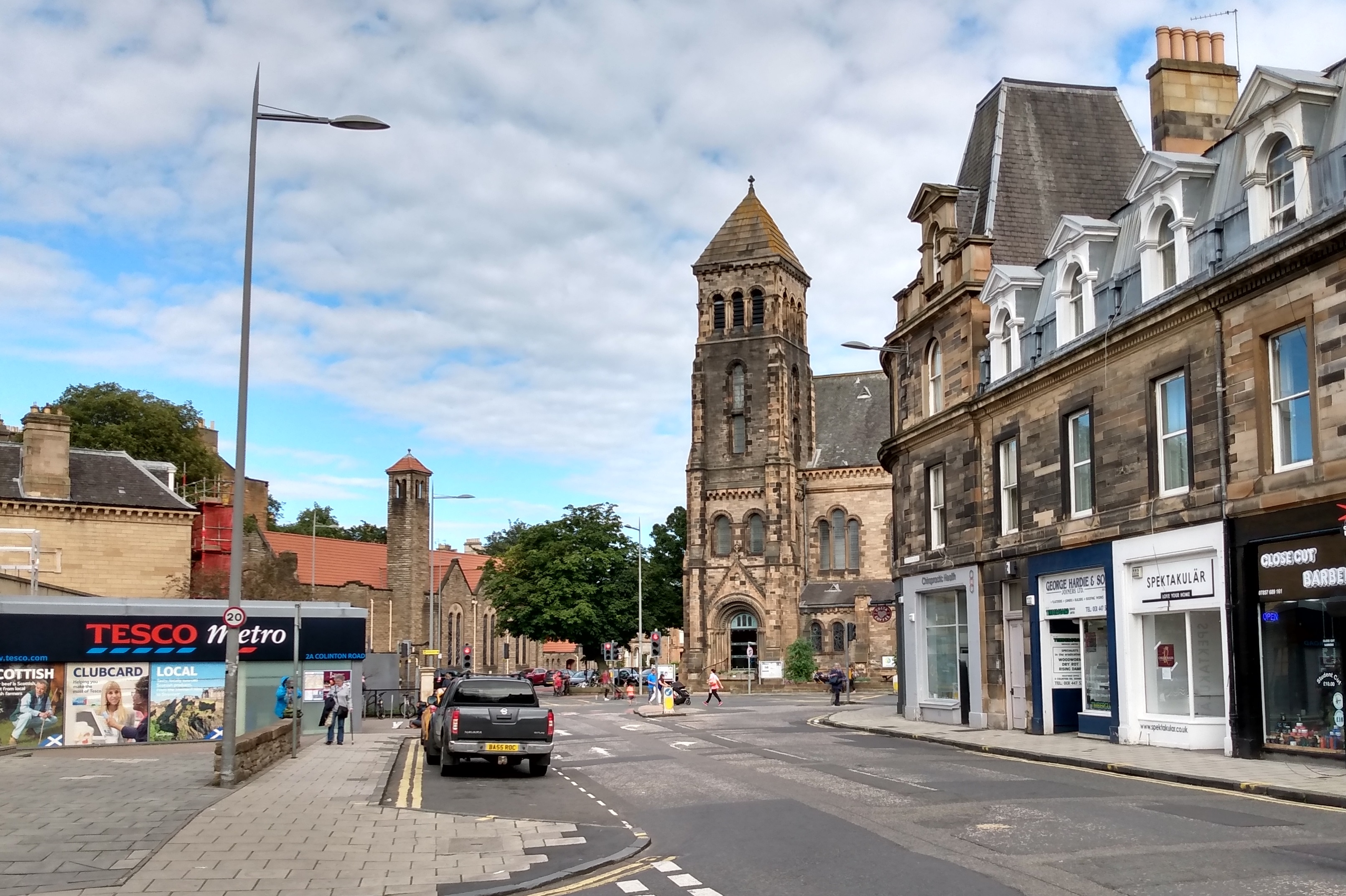
View towards Holy Corner from Colinton Road

Primary education in Merchiston is provided by Craiglockhart Primary School and Bruntsfield Primary School. Merchiston spans the catchment areas for Boroughmuir and Tynecastle secondary schools. Also in the area are a number of independent schools including George Watson's College and a Steiner School.

Merchiston Castle School was founded in the area in 1828, moving to Merchiston Tower in 1833. In 1914 the Merchiston Castle School board purchased Merchiston Tower from the Honourable John Scott Napier, 14th Laird of Merchiston, and used it up until 1930 when the school moved to a new site at Colinton (whilst retaining the Merchiston Castle name).

Today, Merchiston Tower is part of the campus of Edinburgh Napier University. The university also uses a variety of other buildings in this and surrounding areas, such as former schools and churches, some of which would otherwise have been demolished or made into further flats.

== Transportation ==
On the fringes of the area where it meets Craiglockhart (to the west) is the South Suburban railway line, which closed to passenger traffic in 1962. To the north of the area is the Union Canal. North of the canal (in the area sometimes known as North Merchiston or Shandon and sometimes taken to be part of Polwarth) is the site of the former Merchiston railway station, a railway station on the now-closed Caledonian Railway line to Edinburgh Princes Street railway station.

== Parks ==
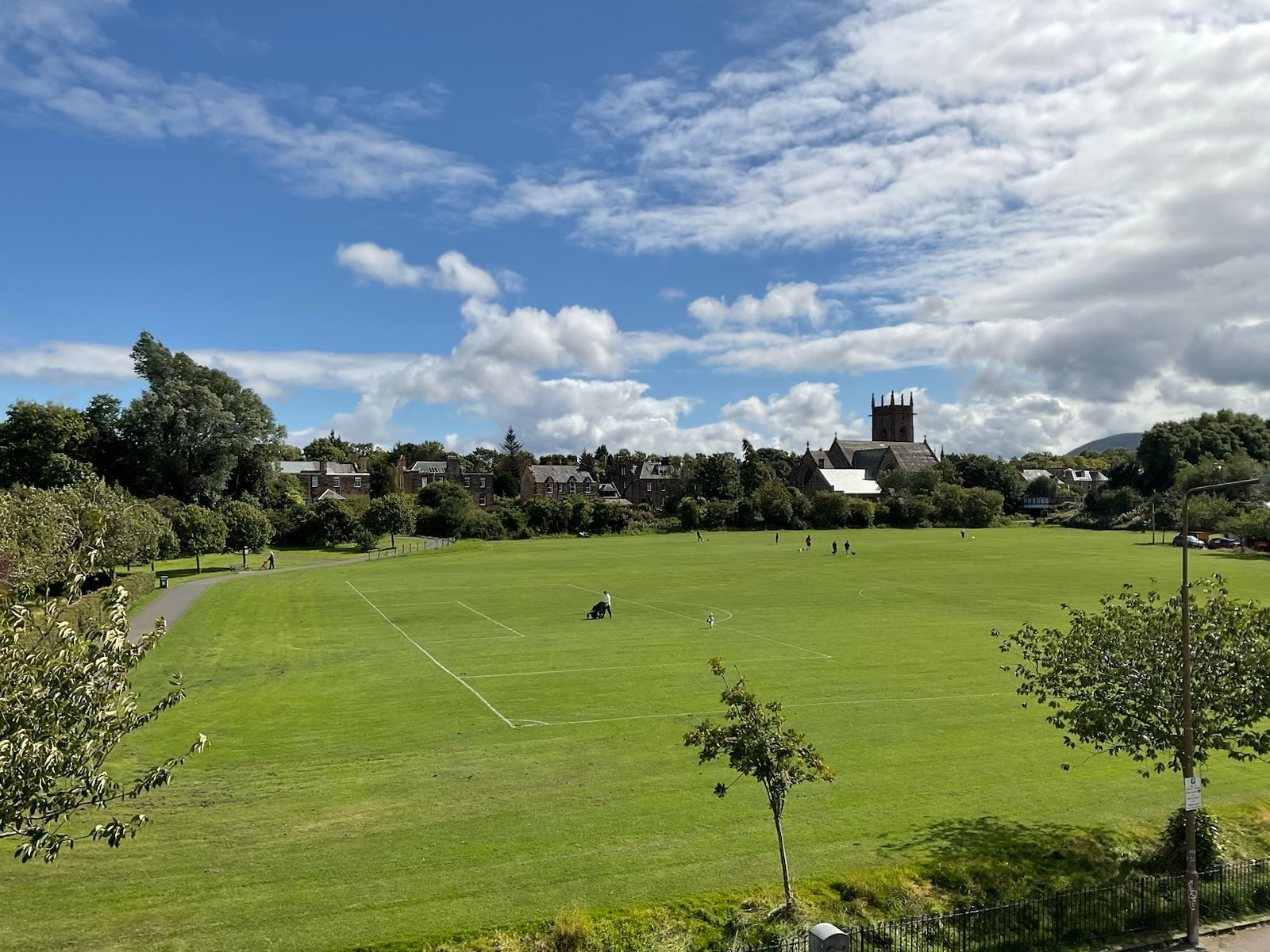
Harrison Park East seen from West Bryson Road

Harrison Park, a popular community park roughly seventeen acres (seven hectares) in size is located to the northwest of Merchiston. The park provides a range of recreational facilities including pitches, play area, cycle path and a formal garden.

== Notable people ==
The area is home to writers Lin Anderson, Colin Douglas, Alexander McCall Smith (author of The No. 1 Ladies' Detective Agency novels), politician Sir Graham Watson and comedian Dylan Moran. J. K. Rowling had her Edinburgh home in Merchiston for many years but has since moved to Killiechassie. Ian Rankin (author of the Inspector Rebus novels), lived in Merchiston before moving to the Quartermile development in 2019. The district was also the childhood home of Scotland and British Lions rugby players Gavin Hastings and Scott Hastings.
