= Andrew Ramsay, Lord Abbotshall =

Sir Andrew Ramsay, Lord Abbotshall (May 1619 – 17 January 1688), Privy Counsellor, was the first Lord Provost of Edinburgh (as opposed to "Provost" of Edinburgh) and a judge of the Court of Session.

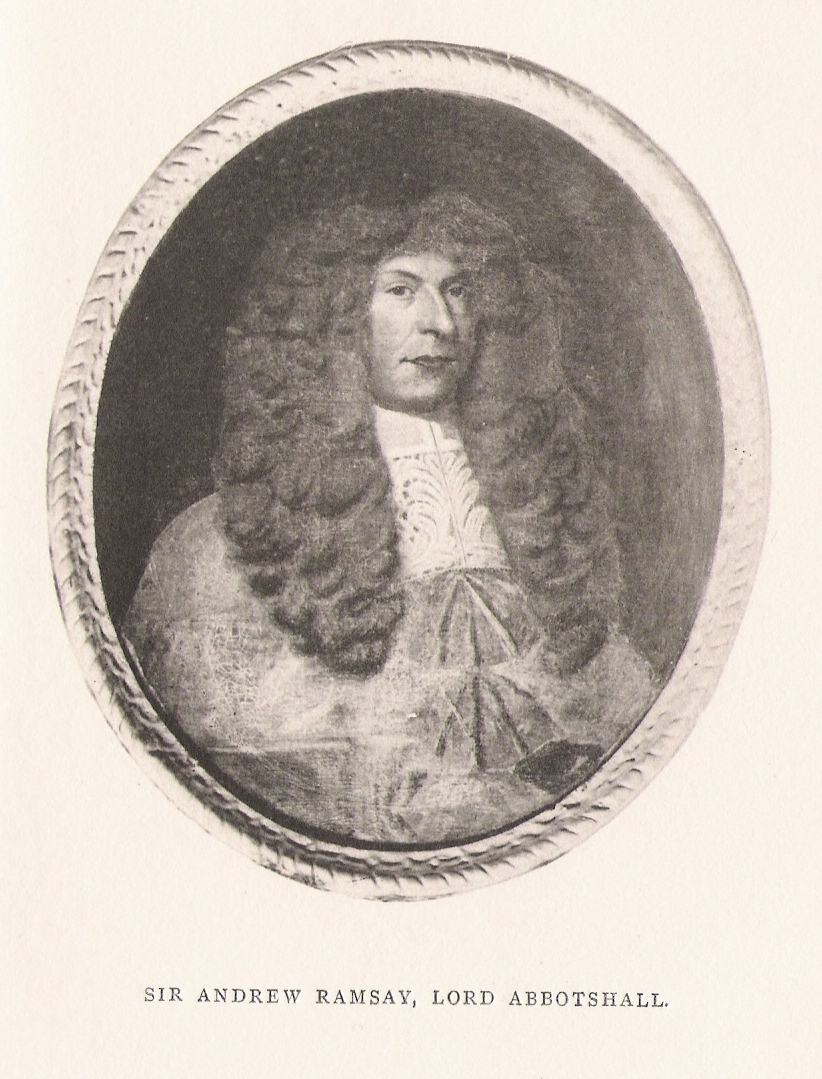
Lord Abbotshall

Ramsay Gardens and Ramsay Lane in Edinburgh are named after him. His Edinburgh house stood at the head of what is now Ramsay Lane, just north of what is now the Camera Obscura.

== Family ==
Andrew Ramsay was the third son of the Reverend Andrew Ramsay (d.1659), Minister of the Old Kirk, Edinburgh, and from 1620 – 1626 Professor of Divinity and Rector at Edinburgh University, a younger son of David Ramsay, 1534 – 1625, and Katherine Carnegie; and a great-grandson of William Ramsay of Balmain, 1510 – 1569. Sir Andrew's mother was Mary, daughter of Alexander Frazer, Laird of Dores.

== Lord Provost ==
He became a very successful merchant, and was elected the youngest Bailie of Edinburgh in 1652. In 1654 he succeeded Archibald Tod as Provost, a position he held until 1658. This was a delicate time for the Edinburgh Council who had to submit many of their decisions to Oliver Cromwell in London. He was also, from 1665, Rector and Governor of Edinburgh University, where he had corporal punishment abolished.

In 1662 he was again elected Provost by the council, this time for eleven years. He found the council this time almost bankrupt and engaged in wide-ranging measures to rectify that (Mackenzie says he was "tyrannical"), one being the council's dismissal in 1665 of Sir William Thomson, the Town Clerk, for corruption. William Ramsay (d.1670 at Newcastle upon Tyne), the Provost's second son, became the new Town Clerk until his death. The next Town Clerk was Sir James Rocheid.

In 1667 Sir Andrew Ramsay received a letter from Charles II stating that in future the Chief Magistrate of Edinburgh should be permanently styled Lord Provost of Edinburgh, with the same rank and precedence as the Lord Mayor of London and Dublin.

In 1670 it was Ramsay who took Major Weir's confession of witchcraft.

== Politics and disgrace ==
He represented Edinburgh in the Parliament of Scotland from 1665 to 1674. About this time Ramsay became friendly with John Maitland, 1st Duke of Lauderdale. He became a member of the Privy Council of Scotland, a judge of the Court of Exchequer, and, on 23 November 1671, by Royal appointment, a judge as a Lord Ordinary in the Court of Session as Lord Abbotshall, regardless of not being a trained lawyer (but not the only one). However he was not liked by the Duchess and she conspired against him with his enemies in the City of Edinburgh, within and without the council, and Lord Abbotshall was later stripped of his offices on 1 December 1673. He was readmitted a Privy Counsellor, on 5 August 1675.

He lived long enough to take some pleasure to see many of his enemies who had conspired against him, Kincardine, Dirleton, Carrington, and Lauderdale, all turned out of their offices more ignominiously than he.

== Accusations of corruption ==
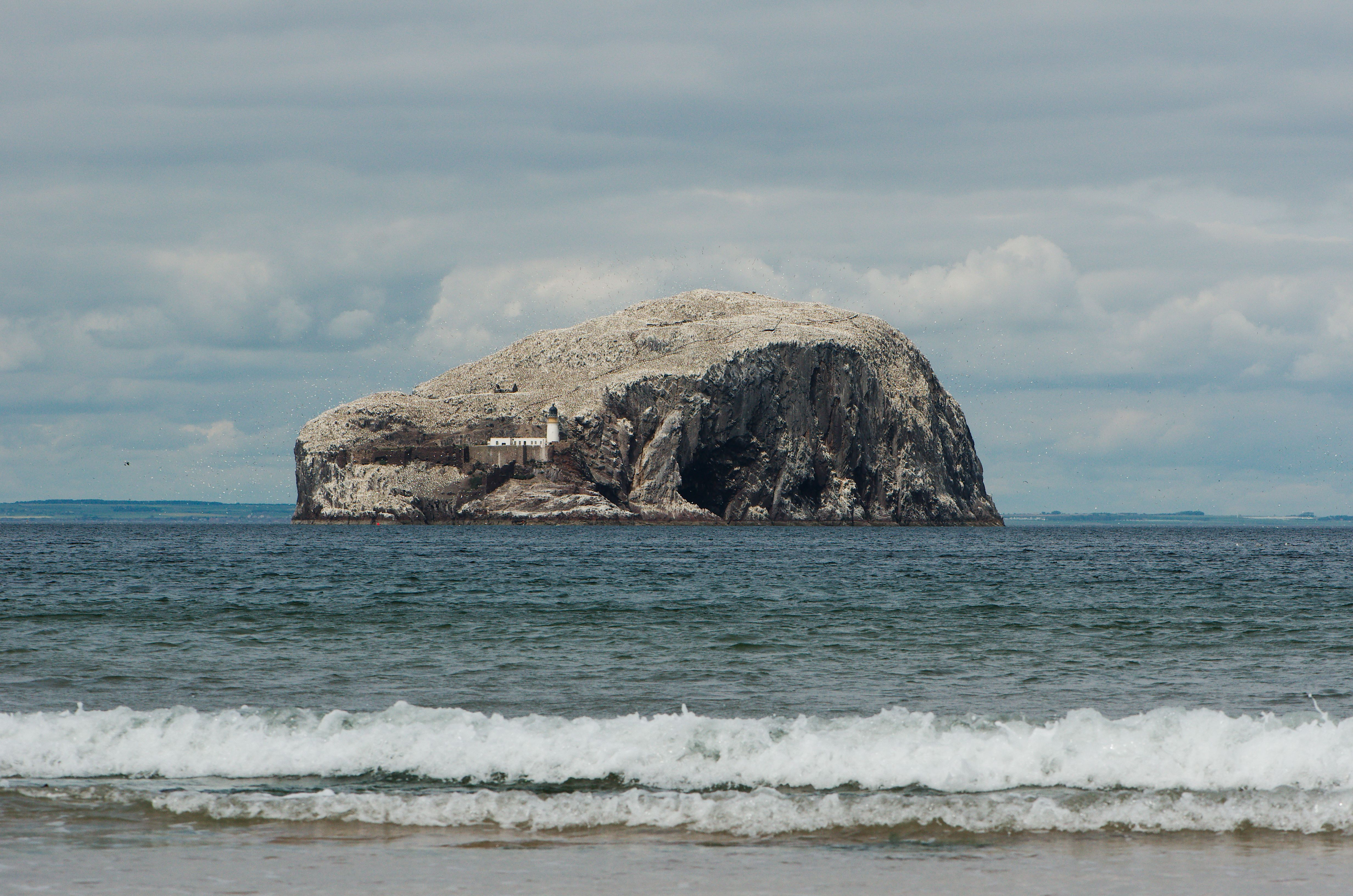
Bass Rock

Besides Abbotshall in Fife, which he made the family seat and took his title from, Ramsay acquired extensive estates in his lifetime, and his son and heir, Sir Andrew Ramsay, married the heiress of Waughton in East Lothian, an ancient seat of the Hepburn family. In 1671 Lord Abbotshall purchased from his son the Bass Rock for £400 sterling and then persuaded the Duke of Lauderdale to get the government to purchase it for the tidy sum of £4000 sterling. Sir George Mackenzie thought this the most brazen piece of corruption on Abbotshall's part, and said in his Memoirs of Lauderdale and Abbotshall that "they were kind to one another upon His Majesty's expenses".

== Marriage and death ==
He died at Abbotshall, aged 69 years, having married Janet (d. Oct 1699), daughter of James Craw of Gunsgreen, near Eyemouth, Berwickshire, by his spouse Janet née Williamson.

Of their children:

- Sir Andrew Ramsay, 1st Baronet, of Waughton (d. after 1722), his heir, who married Margaret (1650–1672) daughter of John Hepburn of Waughton (d. before September 1669).
- Janet, married, in 1669, Sir John Lauder, Lord Fountainhall.
- Helen, married by contract dated 22 December 1687, Alexander Hay of Monkton, Advocate
- Margaret, married George Home of Whitfield (d. 1739), near Coldingham. One of their children was Alexander Home of Manderston, near Duns, Scottish Borders.
