= Alexander Napier (2nd Laird of Merchiston) =

Scottish politician and diplomat

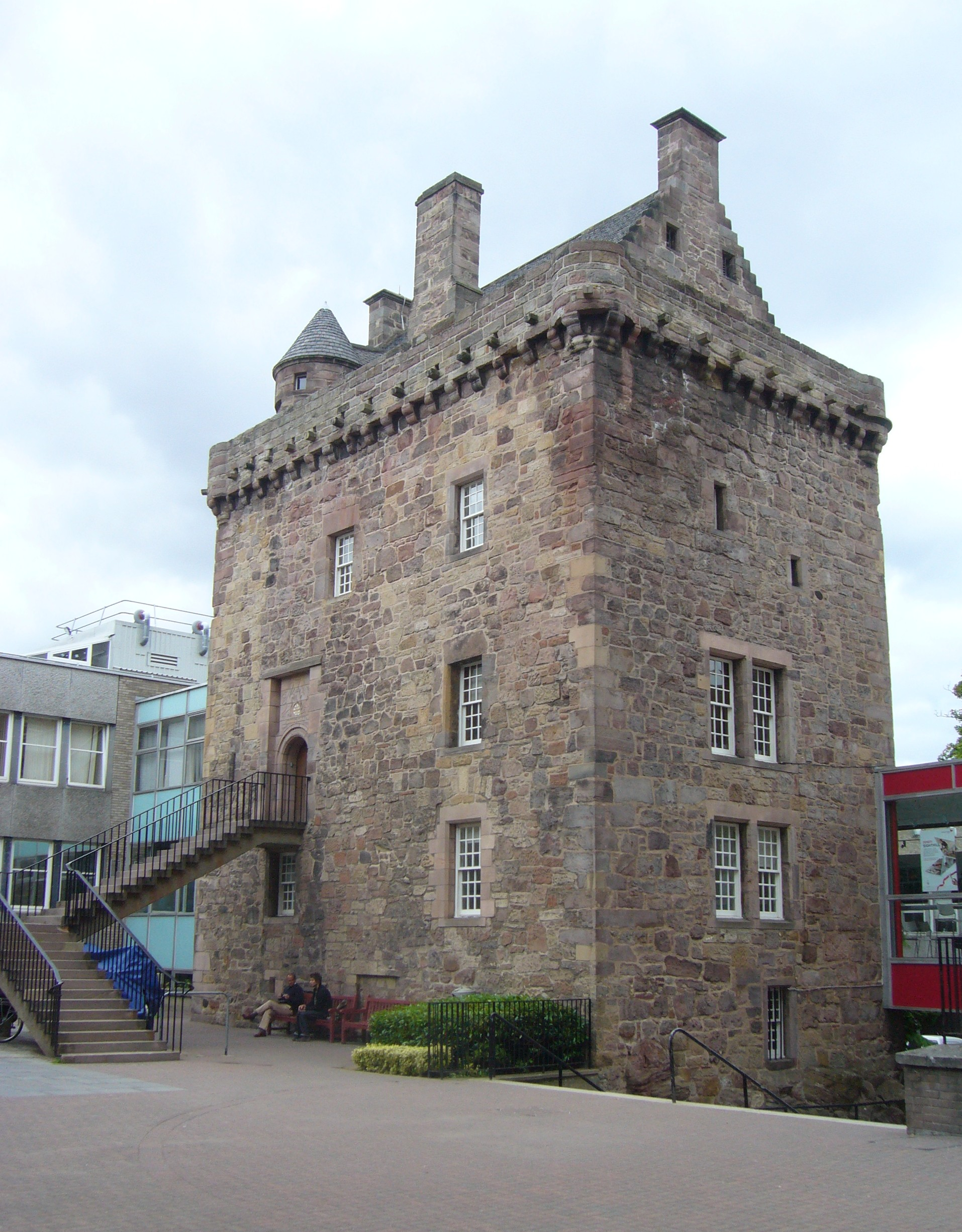
Merchiston Tower was probably built by Alexander Napier, 2nd Laird of Merchiston, around 1454.

Sir Alexander Napier, 2nd Laird of Merchiston (died c. 1474) was a Scottish politician and diplomat. He thrice served as Provost of Edinburgh (1453–55, 1456–62, and 1469–74), and served as Commissioner for Edinburgh in the parliaments of 1458, 1463, 1464, 1469, 1471 and 1473.

Alexander was the son and heir of Alexander Napare (Napier), first Laird of Merchiston, a burgess and Provost (1437) of Edinburgh. He initially belonged to the household of the queen-mother, Joan Beaufort, and then served as Comptroller to James II (1449–61), ambassador to England (1451 and 1461), and was knighted and appointed Vice-Admiral of Scotland before 7 July 1461. In 1468 he was named joint-commissioner, with Andrew Stewart, lord chancellor, to negotiate a marriage between James III and Margaret, daughter of Christian I of Denmark.

Napier was sent on special embassies to Bruges, in 1472, and to Burgundy, in 1473.

He was married to Elizabeth Lauder (1410–1470). They were parents to Sir John Napier, 3rd Laird of Merchiston, Provost of Edinburgh 1484–5.

He died some time between 24 October 1473 and 15 February 1474.

== Descendants ==
His descendants included the world-famous mathematician John Napier.
