= John Napier =

Scottish mathematician (1550–1617)

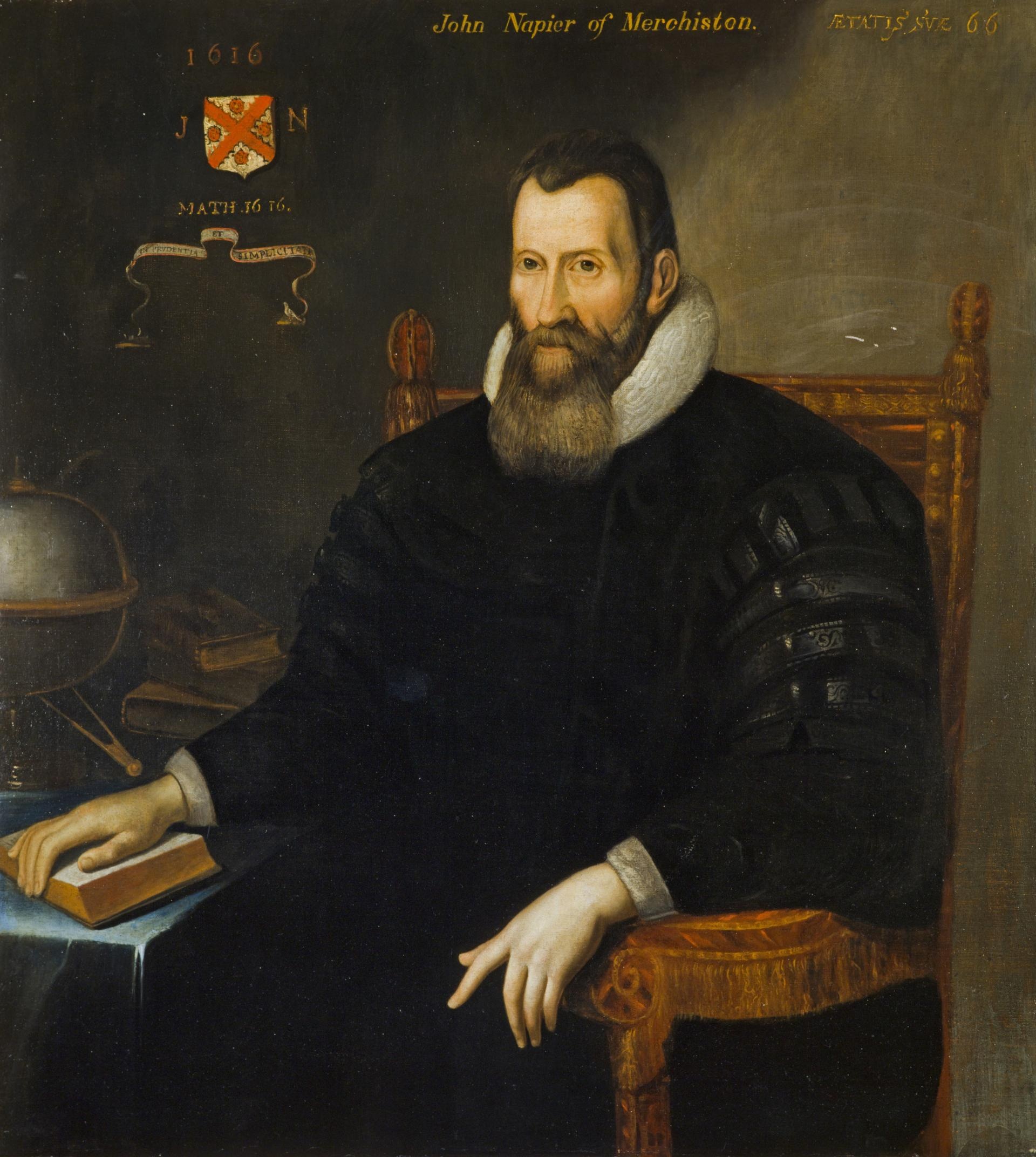
- 1616 portrait of Napier
- Born: 1 February 1550; Edinburgh, Kingdom of Scotland
- Died: 4 April 1617 (aged 67); Edinburgh, Kingdom of Scotland
- Education: University of St Andrews
- Known for: Logarithms; Napier's bones Decimal notation Spherical trigonometry
- Scientific career
- Fields: Mathematician

John Napier of Merchiston (/ˈneɪpi.ər/ NAY-pee-ər; Latinized as Ioannes Neper; 1 February 1550 – 4 April 1617), nicknamed Marvellous Merchiston, was a Scottish landowner known as a mathematician, physicist and astronomer. He was the 8th Laird of Merchiston. Napier is best known as the discoverer of logarithms. He also invented the Napier's bones calculating device and popularised the use of the decimal point in arithmetic.

Napier's birthplace, Merchiston Tower in Edinburgh, is now part of the facilities of Edinburgh Napier University. There is a memorial to him at St Cuthbert's Parish Church at the west end of Princes Street Gardens in Edinburgh.

== Life ==
Napier's father was Sir Archibald Napier of Merchiston Castle and his mother was Janet Bothwell, daughter of the politician and judge Francis Bothwell, and a sister of Adam Bothwell who became the Bishop of Orkney. Archibald Napier was 16 years old when John Napier was born.

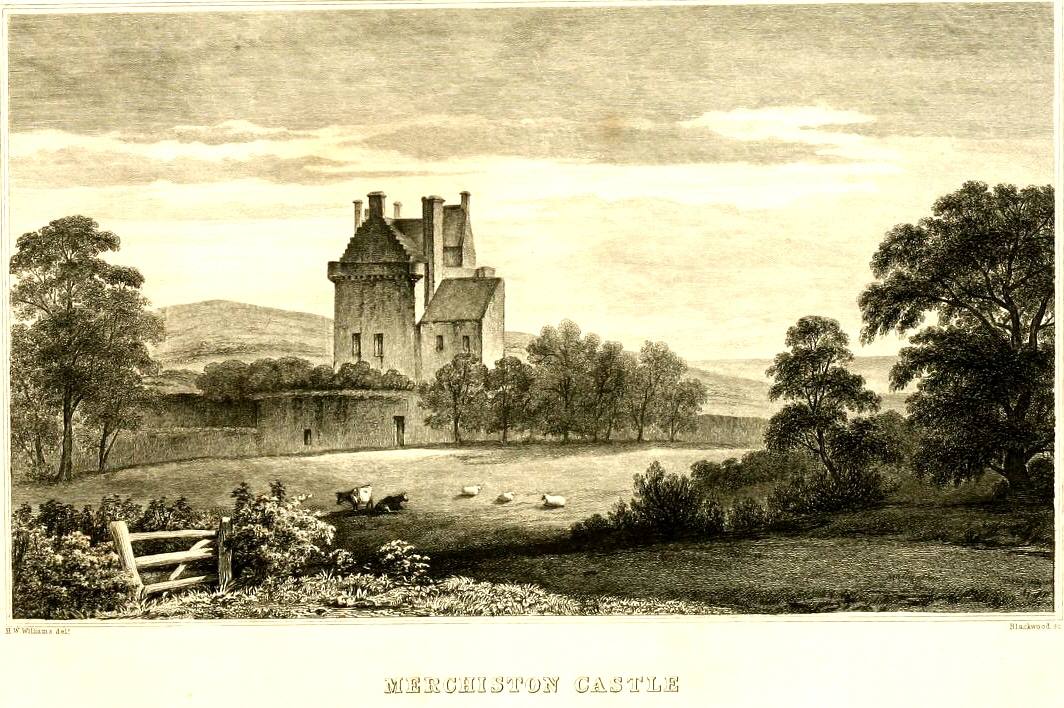
Merchiston Castle from an 1834 woodcut

There are no records of Napier's early learning, but many believe that he was privately tutored during early childhood. At age 13 he was enrolled in St Salvator's College, St Andrews. Near the time of his matriculation the quality of the education provided by the university was poor, owing in part to the Reformation's causing strife between those of the old faith and the growing numbers of Protestants. There are no records showing that John Napier completed his education at St Andrews. It is believed he left Scotland to further his education in mainland Europe, following the advice given by his uncle Adam Bothwell in a letter written to John Napier's father on 5 December 1560, saying, "I pray you, sir, to send John to the schools either to France or Flanders, for he can learn no good at home." It is not known which university Napier attended in Europe, but when he returned to Scotland in 1571 he was fluent in Greek, a language not commonly taught in European universities at the time. There are no records showing his enrollment in the premier universities in Paris or Geneva during this time either.

In 1571 Napier, aged 21, returned to Scotland and bought a castle at Gartness in 1574. On the death of his father in 1608 Napier and his family moved into Merchiston Castle in Edinburgh, where he lived for the rest of his life. He had a property within Edinburgh city as well, on Borthwick's Close off the Royal Mile.

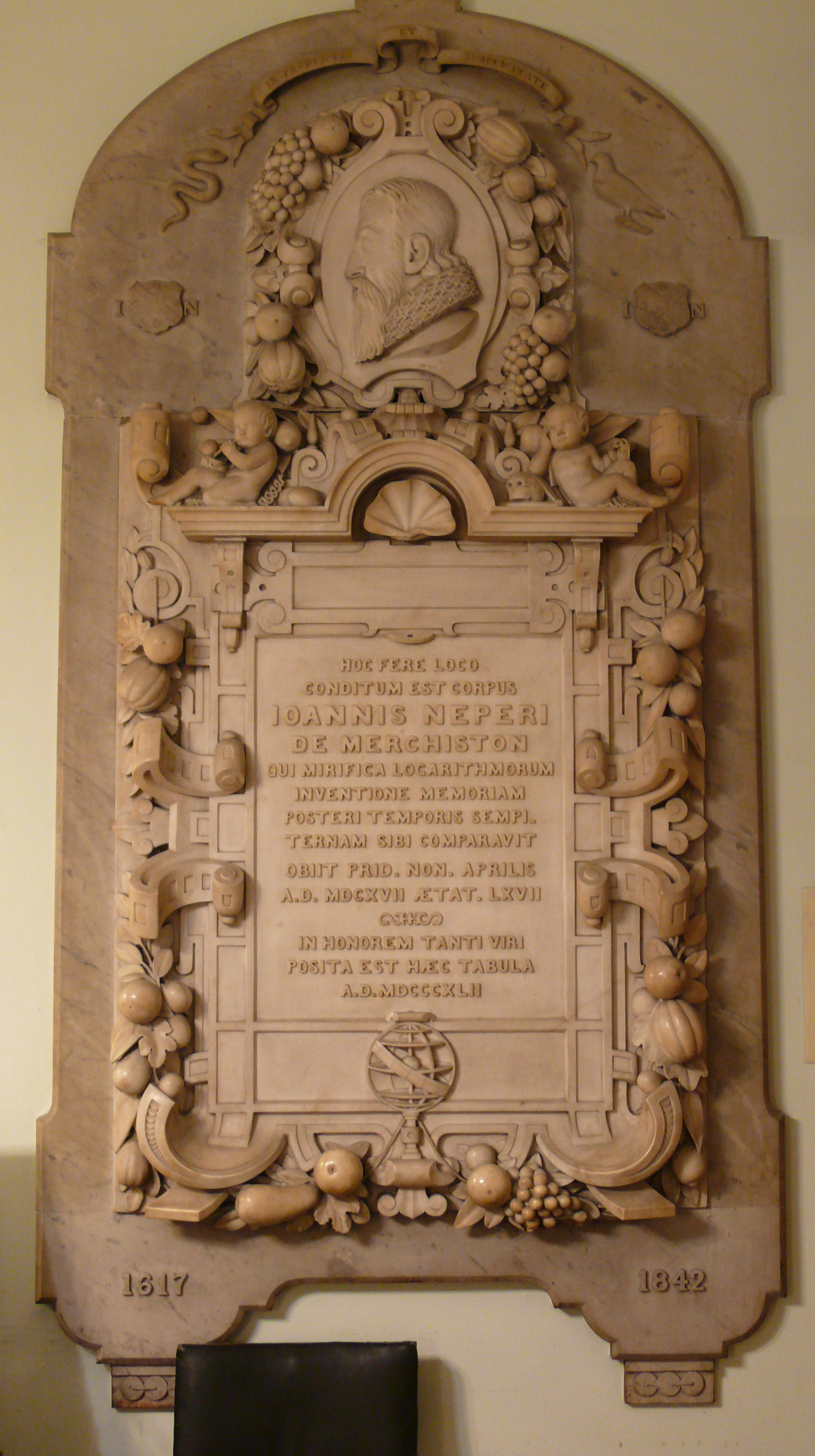
Memorial to John Napier in St Cuthbert's Church, Edinburgh

On 7 June 1596 Napier wrote a paper Secret inventions, profitable and necessary in these days for defence of this island. He describes two kinds of burning mirror for use against ships at a distance, a special kind of artillery shot and a musket-proof metal chariot.

Napier died from the effects of gout at home at Merchiston Castle at the age of 67. He was buried in the kirkyard of St Giles in Edinburgh. Following the loss of the kirkyard of St Giles to build Parliament House, his remains were transferred to an underground vault on the north side of St Cuthbert's Parish Church on the west side of Edinburgh. There is also a wall monument to Napier at St Cuthbert's.

Like many mathematicians at the time Napier worked on methods to reduce the labour required for calculations, and he became famous for the devices that he invented to assist with these issues of computation, for example the numbering rods more quaintly known as Napier's bones.

In addition Napier recognised the potential of the recent developments in mathematics, particularly those of prosthaphaeresis, decimal fractions and symbolic index arithmetic, to tackle the issue of reducing computation. He appreciated that for the most part practitioners who had laborious computations generally did them in the context of trigonometry. Therefore, as well as developing the logarithmic relation, Napier set it in a trigonometric context so it would be even more relevant.

== Mathematics ==
=== Napier's Bones ===
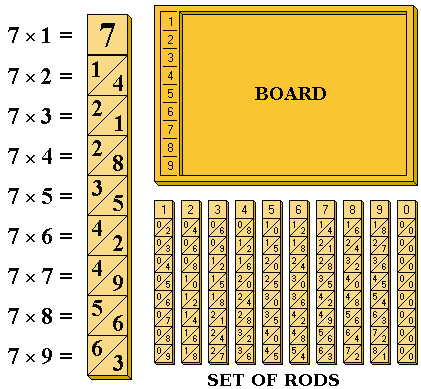
Napier's Bones

His work Mirifici Logarithmorum Canonis Descriptio (1614) contained fifty-seven pages of explanatory matter and ninety pages of tables listing the natural logarithms of trigonometric functions. The book also has a discussion of theorems in spherical trigonometry, usually known as Napier's Rules of Circular Parts.

Modern English translations of both Napier's books on logarithms and their description can be found on the web, as well as a discussion of Napier's bones and Promptuary (another early calculating device).

His invention of logarithms was quickly taken up at Gresham College, and prominent English mathematician Henry Briggs visited Napier in 1615. Among the matters they discussed was a re-scaling of Napier's logarithms, in which the presence of the mathematical constant now known as e (more accurately, e times a large power of 10 rounded to an integer) was a practical difficulty. Neither Napier nor Briggs actually discovered the constant e; that discovery was made decades later by Jacob Bernoulli.

Napier delegated to Briggs the computation of a revised table. The computational advance available via logarithms, the inverse of powered numbers or exponential notation, was such that it made calculations by hand much quicker. The way was opened to later scientific advances, in astronomy, dynamics, and other areas of physics.

Napier made further contributions. He improved Simon Stevin's decimal notation, introducing the full stop (.) as the delimiter for the fractional part. Lattice multiplication, used by Fibonacci, was made more convenient by his introduction of Napier's bones, a multiplication tool using a set of numbered rods.

Napier may have worked largely in isolation, but he had contact with Tycho Brahe who corresponded with his friend John Craig. Craig certainly announced the discovery of logarithms to Brahe in the 1590s (the name itself came later); there is a story from Anthony à Wood, perhaps not well substantiated, that Napier had a hint from Craig that Longomontanus, a follower of Brahe, was working in a similar direction. Craig had notes on a method of Paul Wittich that used trigonometric identities to reduce a multiplication formula for the sine function to additions.

=== Trigonometry ===

When one of the angles, say C, of a spherical triangle is equal to π/2 the various identities given above are considerably simplified. There are ten identities relating three elements chosen from the set a, b, c, A, B.

Napier provided an elegant mnemonic aid for the ten independent equations: the mnemonic is called Napier's circle or Napier's pentagon (when the circle in the above figure, right, is replaced by a pentagon).

First, write the six parts of the triangle (three vertex angles, three arc angles for the sides) in the order they occur around any circuit of the triangle: for the triangle shown above left, going clockwise starting with a gives aCbAcB. Next replace the parts that are not adjacent to C (that is A, c, B) by their complements and then delete the angle C from the list. The remaining parts can then be drawn as five ordered, equal slices of a pentagram, or circle, as shown in the above figure (right). For any choice of three contiguous parts, one (the middle part) will be adjacent to two parts and opposite the other two parts. The ten Napier's Rules are given by

- sine of the middle part = the product of the tangents of the adjacent parts
- sine of the middle part = the product of the cosines of the opposite parts

The key for remembering which trigonometric function goes with which part is to look at the first vowel of the kind of part: middle parts take the sine, adjacent parts take the tangent, and opposite parts take the cosine. For an example, starting with the sector containing $a$ we have:

$$\sin a = \tan(\pi/2-B)\,\tan b = \cos(\pi/2-c)\, \cos(\pi/2-A)
=\cot B\,\tan b = \sin c\,\sin A.$$

The full set of rules for the right spherical triangle is (Todhunter, Art.62)

$$\begin{alignat}{4}
&\text{(R1)}&\qquad  \cos c&=\cos a\,\cos b,
&\qquad\qquad
&\text{(R6)}&\qquad  \tan b&=\cos A\,\tan c,\\
&\text{(R2)}&  \sin a&=\sin A\,\sin c,
&&\text{(R7)}&  \tan a&=\cos B\,\tan c,\\
&\text{(R3)}&  \sin b&=\sin B\,\sin c,
&&\text{(R8)}&   \cos A&=\sin B\,\cos a,\\
&\text{(R4)}&  \tan a&=\tan A\,\sin b,
&&\text{(R9)}&  \cos B&=\sin A\,\cos b,\\
&\text{(R5)}&  \tan b&=\tan B\,\sin a,
&&\text{(R10)}&   \cos c&=\cot A\,\cot B.
\end{alignat}$$

A quadrantal spherical triangle together with Napier's circle for use in his mnemonics

A quadrantal spherical triangle is defined to be a spherical triangle in which one of the sides subtends an angle of π/2 radians at the centre of the sphere: on the unit sphere the side has length π/2. In the case that the side c has length π/2 on the unit sphere the equations governing the remaining sides and angles may be obtained by applying the rules for the right spherical triangle of the previous section to the polar triangle A'B'C' with sides a',b',c' such that A' = π − a, a' = π − A etc. The results are:

$$\begin{alignat}{4}
&\text{(Q1)}&\qquad  \cos C&=-\cos A\,\cos B,
&\qquad\qquad
&\text{(Q6)}&\qquad \tan B&=-\cos a\,\tan C,\\
&\text{(Q2)}&  \sin A&=\sin a\,\sin C,
&&\text{(Q7)}&  \tan A&=-\cos b\,\tan C,\\
&\text{(Q3)}&  \sin B&=\sin b\,\sin C,
&&\text{(Q8)}&   \cos a&=\sin b\,\cos A,\\
&\text{(Q4)}&  \tan A&=\tan a\,\sin B,
&&\text{(Q9)}&  \cos b&=\sin a\,\cos B,\\
&\text{(Q5)}&  \tan B&=\tan b\,\sin A,
&&\text{(Q10)}&   \cos C&=-\cot a\,\cot b.
\end{alignat}$$

Logarithm

Given a positive real number b such that b ≠ 1, the logarithm of a positive real number x with respect to base b is the exponent by which b must be raised to yield x. In other words, the logarithm of x to base b is the unique real number y such that b^{y} = x.

The logarithm is denoted "log_{b} x" (pronounced as "the logarithm of x to base b", "the base-b logarithm of x", or most commonly "the log, base b, of x").

An equivalent and more succinct definition is that the function $f \colon x\to log_{b} x$ is the inverse function to the function $f \colon x\to b^{x}.$

== Theology ==
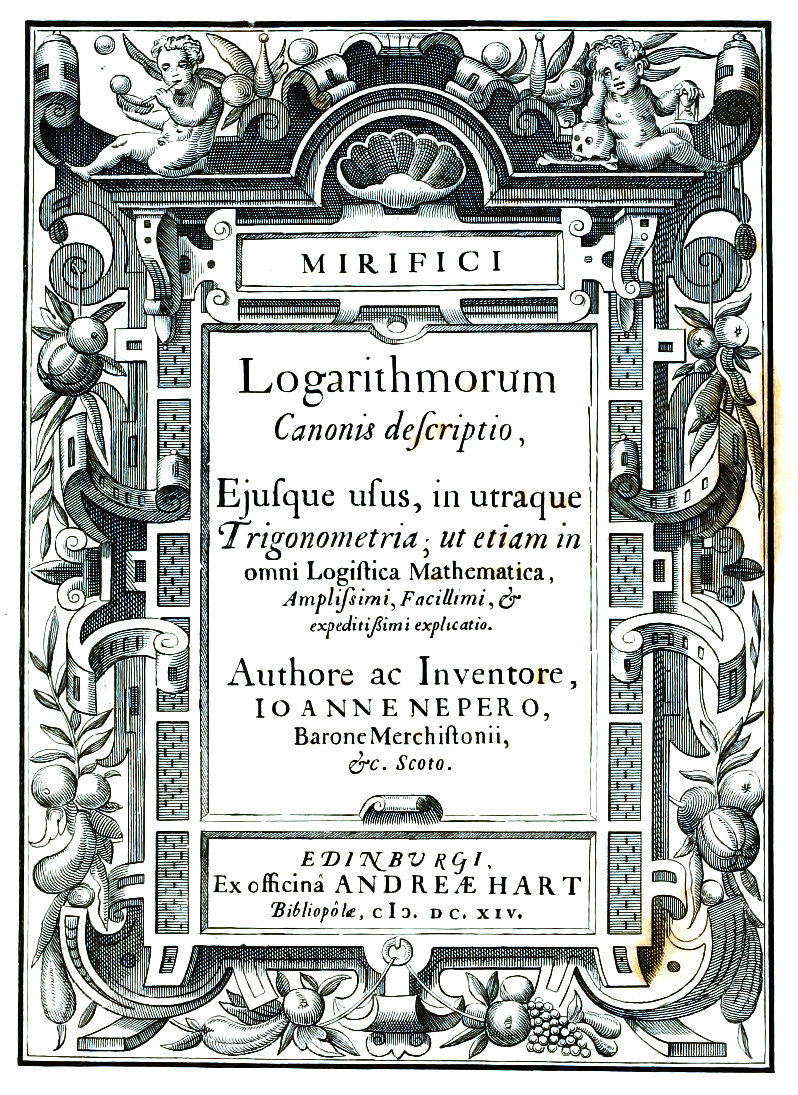
Cover of Mirifici logarithmorum canonis descriptio (1614)

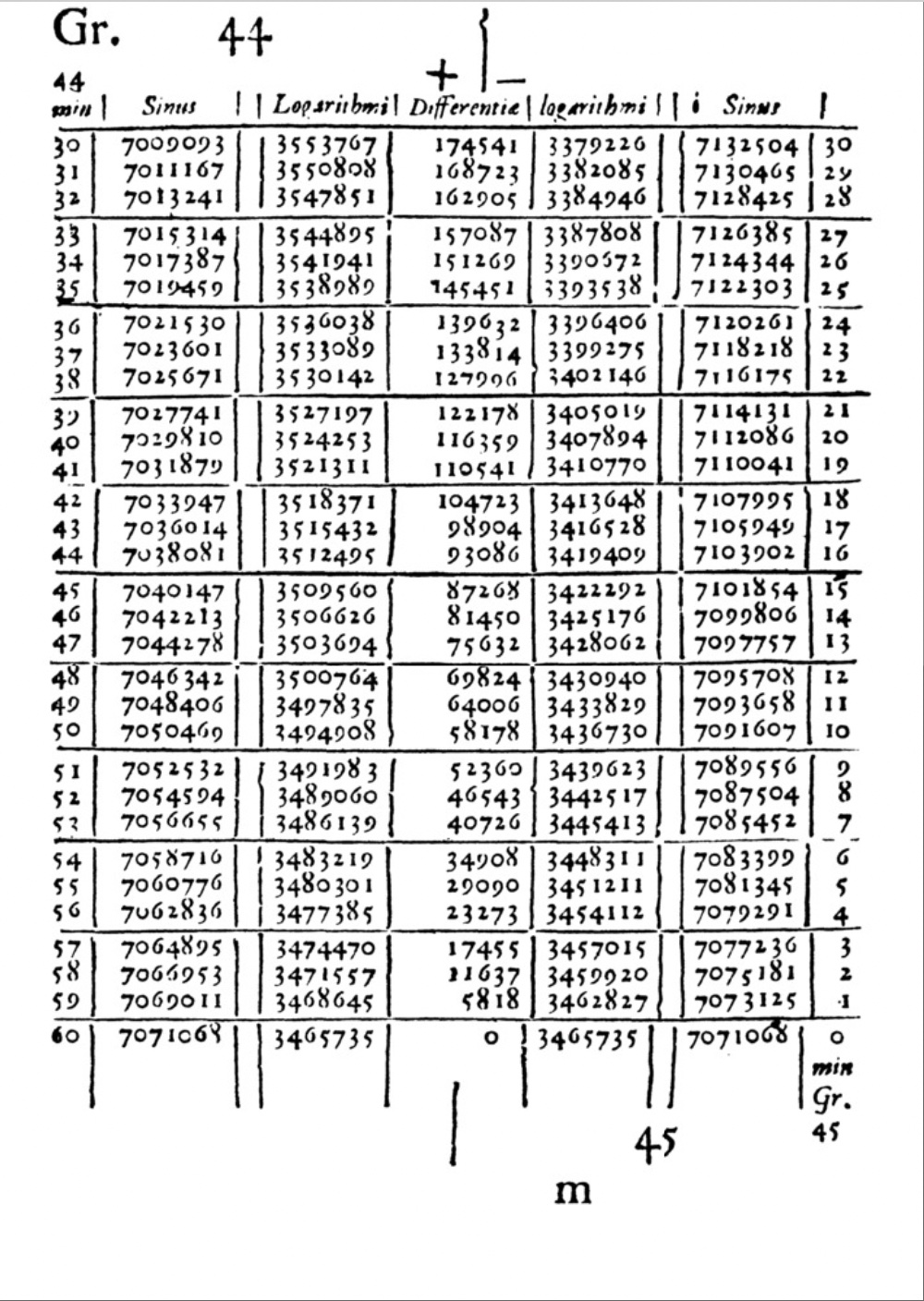
Page from Mirifici logarithmorum canonis descriptio, for 45 degrees

Napier had an interest in the Book of Revelation, from his student days at St Salvator's College, St Andrews. Under the influence of the sermons of Christopher Goodman, he developed a strongly anti-papal reading, going as far as to say that the Pope was the Antichrist in some of his writings.

Napier regarded A Plaine Discovery of the Whole Revelation of St. John (1593) as his most important work. It was written in English, unlike his other publications, in order to reach the widest audience and so that, according to Napier, "the simple of this island may be instructed". A Plaine Discovery used mathematical analysis of the Book of Revelation to attempt to predict the date of the Apocalypse. Napier identified events in chronological order which he believed were parallels to events described in the Book of Revelation believing that Revelation's structure implied that the prophecies would be fulfilled incrementally. In this work Napier dated the seventh trumpet to 1541, and predicted the end of the world would occur in either 1688 or 1700. Napier did not believe that people could know the true date of the Apocalypse, but claimed that since the Bible contained so many clues about the end, God wanted the Church to know when the end was coming.

In his dedication of the Plaine Discovery to James VI, dated 29 January 1594, Napier urged the king to see "that justice be done against the enemies of God's church," and counselled the King "to reform the universal enormities of his country, and first to begin at his own house, family, and court." The volume includes nine pages of Napier's English verse. It met with success at home and abroad. In 1600 Michiel Panneel produced a Dutch translation, and this reached a second edition in 1607. In 1602 the work appeared at La Rochelle in a French version, by Georges Thomson, revised by Napier, and that also went through several editions (1603, 1605, and 1607). A new edition of the English original was called for in 1611, when it was revised and corrected by the author, and enlarged by the addition of With a resolution of certain doubts, moved by some well affected brethren.; this appeared simultaneously at Edinburgh and London. The author stated that he still intended to publish a Latin edition, but it never appeared. A German translation, by Leo de Dromna, of the first part of Napier's work appeared at Gera in 1611, and of the whole by Wolfgang Meyer at Frankfurt-am-Main, in 1615. Among Napier's followers was Matthew Cotterius (Matthieu Cottière).

== Interest in the occult ==
In addition to his mathematical and religious interests, Napier was often perceived as a magician, and is thought to have dabbled in alchemy and necromancy. It was said that he would travel about with a black spider in a small box, and that his black cockerel was his familiar spirit.

Some of Napier's neighbours accused him of being a sorcerer and in league with the devil, believing that all of the time he spent in his study was being used to learn the black art. These rumours were stoked when Napier used his black cockerel to catch a thief. Napier told his servants to go into a darkened room and pet the cockerel, claiming the bird would crow if they were the one who stole his property. Unbeknownst to the servants, Napier had covered the bird with soot and when the servants emerged from the room, Napier inspected their hands to find the one who had been too afraid to touch the rooster.

Another act which Napier is reported to have carried out, which may have seemed mystical to the locals, was when Napier removed the pigeons from his estate since they were eating his grain. Napier caught the pigeons by strewing grain laced with alcohol throughout the field and then capturing the pigeons once they were too drunk to fly away.

A contract still exists for a treasure hunt, made between Napier and Robert Logan of Restalrig. Napier was to search Fast Castle for treasure allegedly hidden there, wherein it is stated that Napier should "do his utmost diligence to search and seek out, and by all craft and ingine to find out the same, or make it sure that no such thing has been there." This contract was never fulfilled by Napier, and no gold was found when the Edinburgh Archaeological Field society excavated the castle between 1971 and 1986.

== Influence ==
Among Napier's early followers were the instrument makers Edmund Gunter and John Speidell. The development of logarithms is given credit as the largest single factor in the general adoption of decimal arithmetic. The Trissotetras (1645) of Thomas Urquhart builds on Napier's work, in trigonometry.

Henry Briggs was an early adopter of the Napierian logarithm. He later computed a new table of logarithms to base 10, accurate to 14 decimal places.

== Eponyms ==
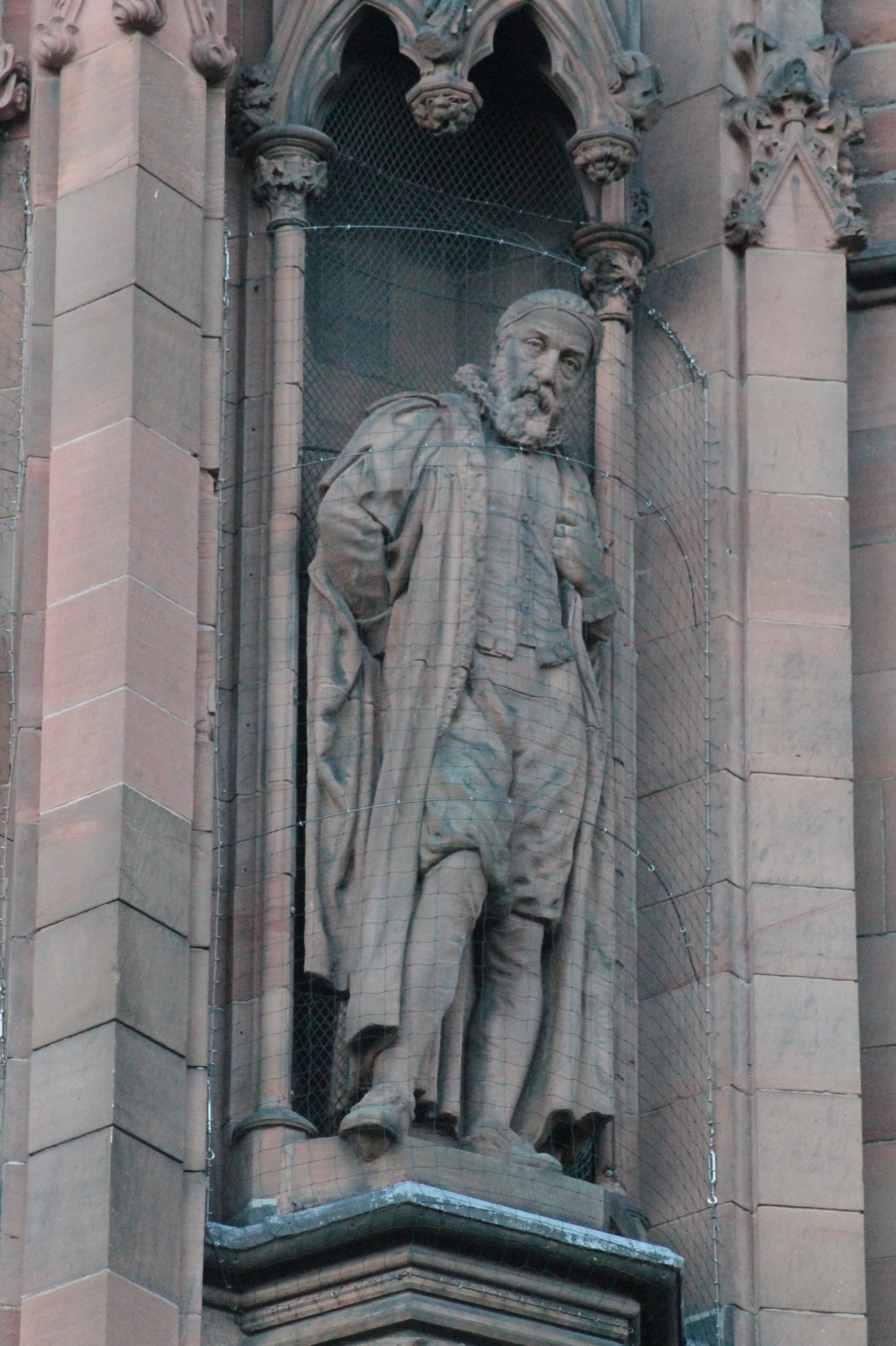
Statue of John Napier, Scottish National Portrait Gallery

An alternative unit to the decibel used in electrical engineering, the neper, is named after Napier, as is Edinburgh Napier University in Edinburgh, Scotland.

The crater Neper on the Moon is named after him.

In French, Spanish and Portuguese, the natural logarithm is named after him (respectively, Logarithme Népérien and Logaritmos Neperianos for Spanish and Portuguese). In Finnish and Italian, the mathematical constant e is named after him (Neperin luku and Numero di Nepero).

== Family ==
In 1572, Napier married 16-year-old Elizabeth, daughter of James Stirling, the 4th Laird of Keir and of Cadder. They had two children. Elizabeth died in 1579, and Napier then married Agnes Chisholm, with whom he had ten more children.

Napier's father-in-law, Sir James Chisholm of Cromlix, was one of many excommunicated by the General Assembly of the Presbyterian party following the Spanish blanks plot. Napier sat on the General Assembly that excommunicated the plotters, and petitioned the King James VI and I to enforce the punishment on the plotters, but was ultimately ignored since the King believed the ministers were acting cruelly, and was in favor of pursuing policies of more appeasement.

His half-brother (through his father's remarriage) was Alexander Napier, Lord Laurieston.

== List of works ==
- (1593) A Plaine Discovery of the Whole Revelation of St. John
- (1614) Mirifici logarithmorum canonis descriptio – Edward Wright's English translation was published in 1616.
- (1617) Rabdologiæ seu Numerationis per Virgulas libri duo (Google Books link)(published posthumously) Rabdology (Wikipedia)
- (1619) Mirifici logarithmorum canonis constructio –written before the Descriptio, but published posthumously by his son Robert. Translated into English in 1889.
- (1839) De arte logistica

== See also ==
- List of colleges and universities named after people
- Location arithmetic
- Napier's analogies
- Napierian logarithm
- Rabdology
