= Alexander Napier (1st Laird of Merchiston) =

Scottish landowner and politician

Alexander Napier, 1st Laird of Merchiston (died c. 1454) was a Scottish landowner and politician who served as Provost of Edinburgh in 1437–1438.

He was the son of William Napier, Governor of Edinburgh Castle (or of Alexander Napier, Provost of Edinburgh in 1403).

He acquired the estate of Merchiston from King James I in 1436.

Napier had two sons, Alexander and Robert. He died around 1454.
