= Napier (surname) =

- Language: English

Origin
- Region of origin: Scotland

Other names
- Variant form: Napper

Napier (/ˈneɪpi.ər/ NAY-pee-ər) is a surname with an English, Scottish, French or Polish origin.

The British surname Napier is derived from an occupational name for someone who sold or produced table linen; or for a naperer which was a servant who was responsible for the washing and storage of linen in a medieval household.

By tradition, the Scottish surname was given by William the Lion, King of Scots (reigned 1165–1214) to a younger son of the ancient Earls of Lennox after his prowess in battle, when the king is alleged to have said: “Ye have “nae peer” [i.e. you have no peer, meaning no equal]. This is likely to be an apocryphal story made up to give the surname a more elevated origin than simply deriving from one who provided linen, which made it merely comparable to the surname Draper. In 1625, Sir Archibald Napier of Merchiston, the first Lord Napier, presented an affidavit to the College of Heralds, in which he described this origin of the name Napier, as having been bestowed by the king (probably Alexander II) on one Donald Lennox in recognition for acts of bravery. He states:

This battle went hard with the Scots, for the enemy, pressing furiously upon them, forced them to lose ground, until at last they fell to flat running away, which being perceived by Donald, he pulled his father's standard from the bearer thereof, and valiantly encountering the foe, being well followed by the Earl of Lenox's men, he repulsed the enemy, and changed the fortune of the day, whereby a great victory was got. After the battle as the manor is everyone advancing and setting forth his own acts the King said unto them "Ye have all done well but there is one amongst you who hath Na peer," and calling Donald into his presence he commanded him in regard of his worthy service and in augmentation of his honour to change his name from Lenox to Napier, and gave him the lands of Gosford and lands in Fife and made him his own servant, which discourse is confirmed by sundry of my old evidencies and testimonies wherein we are called Lenox alias Napier.

The British surname is derived from the Middle English, Old French napier, nappier which is a derivative of the Old French nappe meaning "table cloth". The earliest occurrences of the surname is of a Peter Napier in 1148 in the Winton Domesday; Ralph (le) Naper, le Napier in 1167–71; and Reginald le Nappere in 1225.

The surname can also be a shortened form of the Polish surname Napierala.

== People ==
- Alan Napier (1903–1988), actor who played Alfred the Butler in the television series Batman
- Sir Albert Edward Alexander Napier, (1881–1973), British civil servant, Permanent Secretary to the Lord Chancellor's Department, 1944–1954
- Sir Alexander Napier, 2nd Laird of Merchistoun (died c. 1473–4), Scottish administrator, diplomat and member of the Scottish Parliament
- Sir Archibald Napier (1534–1608), Scottish landowner and official, master of the Scottish mint and seventh Laird of Merchiston.
- Archibald Napier, 1st Lord Napier, the 9th Laird Napier of Merchiston (c. 1576–1645), Scottish politician and judge
- Archibald Napier, 2nd Lord Napier (c. 1625–1660), Scottish peer and royalist
- Arthur Napier (1853–1916), British philologist
- Arthur Sampson Napier (1853–1916), British academic
- Bill Napier (William M. Napier, born 1940), Scottish astronomer and author
- Billy Napier (born 1979), American football coach
- Buddy Napier (Skelton Le Roy "Buddy" Napier), American Major League Baseball pitcher
- Charles Elers Napier (1812–1847), British naval officer
- Charles "Charlie" Edward Napier (1910–1973), Scottish footballer
- Sir Charles James Napier (1782–1853), British general
- Sir Charles Napier (1786–1860), Scottish admiral of the Royal Navy
- Charles Napier (1936–2011), American actor
- Sir Charles Napier Inn, an 18th-century pub in Chinnor, Oxfordshire, England
- Charles Napier (aviator) (1892–1918), World War I flying ace
- David Napier (precision engineer) (1785–1873), Scottish engineer
- David Napier (marine engineer) (1790–1869), Scottish marine engineer
- Diana Napier (1905–1982), British film actor
- Duncan Napier (1831–1921), Victorian botanist and herbalist
- Duncan Napier (cricketer) (1871–1898), Scottish cricketer and British Army officer
- Elma Napier (1892–1973), Scottish-born writer and politician who lived most of her life in the Caribbean island of Dominica
- Elsie Napier, American politician
- Findlay Napier (born 1978), Scottish musician, guitarist and songwriter
- Francis Napier, 8th Lord Napier (1758–1823), British peer and army officer
- Francis Napier, 10th Lord Napier and 1st Baron Ettrick (1819–1898)
- George Napier (1751–1804), British Army officer
- George Thomas Napier (1784–1855), George Napier's son, also a British Army officer, Governor of the Cape
- George Napper (1550–1610) or Napier, English Roman Catholic priest and martyr
- Sir Gerrard Napier, 1st Baronet (1606–1673), of Middle Marsh and Moor Crichel in Dorset, English Member of Parliament, Royalists during the English Civil War
- Graham Napier (born 1980), English cricketer
- Henry Edward Napier, another of George Napier's sons, naval officer and historian.
- Ian Napier (aviator), World War I flying ace
- Irene Napier (born 1953), Scottish film and television Make-up artist
- Jack Napier (porn star) (born 1972), American pornographic actor
- James Napier (chemist) (1810–1884), Scottish chemist and antiquarian
- James Napier (actor) (born 1982), New Zealand actor
- James Robert Napier (1821–1879), Scottish engineer, inventor of Napier's diagram
- Jim Napier (1938–2018), baseball catcher and manager
- James Napier, "Jimmy Napes", English songwriter, producer and musician
- Jessica Napier (born 1979), New Zealand actress, daughter of Marshall Napier
- John Napier (1550–1617), Scots mathematician (discoverer of logarithms), physicist and astronomer
- John Napier (1859–1939), English clergyman and cricketer
- Sir John Mellis Napier (1882–1976), Chief Justice of South Australia 1942–1967
- John R. Napier (1917–1987), primatologist from the University of London, founder of the Primate Society of Great Britain
- John Napier (born 1944), theatre set designer, recipient of many Tony and Olivier awards
- John Napier (born 1946), Irish-born footballer and manager, notably with Bradford City A.F.C.
- John Napier (born 1946), footballer, birth name Robert John Napier
- John Light Napier (born 1947), U.S. Representative from South Carolina
- John Napier (born 1986), American bobsledder
- Joseph Napier (1804–1882), politician in the United Kingdom
- Joseph Napier, a station keeper for the United States Lifesaving Service, founder of the lifesaving station at St. Joseph, Michigan, whose name was given to the cutter USCGC Joseph Napier
- Lennox Napier (1928–2020), British Army officer
- Lionel Everard Napier (1888–1957), British tropical physician
- Lonnie Napier (1940–2023), American politician from Kentucky
- Macvey Napier (1776–1847), Scottish lawyer, editor of the Encyclopædia Britannica
- Margaret Brisbane, 5th Lady Napier (died 1706), Scottish peer
- Marita Napier (1939–2004), South African operatic soprano
- Mark Napier (1798–1879), Scottish historian
- Mark Napier (born 1957), retired Canadian ice-hockey player
- Mark Napier (born 1961), American internet artist
- Marshall Napier, New Zealand actor, father of Jessica Napier
- Montague Stanley Napier (1870–1931), English automobile and aircraft engine manufacturer
- Mick Napier, American actor and director
- Michael Scott Napier (1929–1996), British Roman Catholic priest and senior Oratorian
- Sir Nathaniel Napier (died 1635), of Middlemarsh Hall and Moor Crichel in Dorset, English Member of Parliament
- Sir Nathaniel Napier, 2nd Baronet (1636–1709), English politician, traveller and dilettante.
- Nigel Napier, 14th Lord Napier (1930–2012), Scottish soldier and courtier
- Nigel Napier-Andrews (born 1942), British/Canadian TV producer and director
- Oliver Napier (1935–2011), first leader of the Alliance Party of Northern Ireland
- Phillip Morris Napier, American politician in Maine
- Priscilla Napier (1908–1998), English biographer
- Prudence Hero Napier, British primatologist
- Richard Napier (1559 – 1 April 1634) English astrologer and medical practitioner
- Robert Napier (1791–1876), Scottish marine engineer
- Sir Robert Napier (died 1615), English judge, Member of Parliament, Chief Baron of the Exchequer in Ireland
- Sir Robert Napier, 1st Baronet, of Luton Hoo (1560–1637), English merchant
- Sir Robert Napier, 2nd Baronet (c. 1603–1661), his son, Member of Parliament
- Robert Napier (died 1766), British Adjutant-General to the Forces
- Robert Napier, 1st Baron Napier of Magdala (1810–1890), British Field Marshal
- The Robert Napier School, Gillingham, Kent
- Sir Robert Napier, 1st Baronet, of Punknoll (1642–1700)
- Ronald Napier (born 1935), South African cricketer
- Russell Napier (1910–1974), Australian actor
- Shabazz Napier (born 1991), Puerto Rican-American basketball player
- Sheena Napier, British costume designer
- Simon Napier-Bell (born 1939), English music professional, one-time manager of The Yardbirds, Wham! and others
- Sue Napier (1948–2010), Tasmanian politician
- Susan Napier, New Zealand novelist
- Susan J. Napier, American professor
- Thomas Napier (builder) (1802–1881), Scottish builder who moved to Australia
- Theodore Napier Scottish Australian who was a leading Scottish nationalist, son of Thomas Napier
- Vice Admiral Sir Trevylyan Dacres Willes Napier (1867–1920), Royal Navy office
- Wilfrid Napier (born 1941), South African cardinal of the Roman Catholic Church
- William Napier, pseudonym for British novelist Christopher Hart (born 1965)
- William Napier (1804–1879), lawyer, newspaper editor (in Singapore), and Lieutenant-Governor of Labuan
- William Napier (1828–1908), winner of the Victoria Cross
- Major-General William Craig Emilius Napier (1818–1903), British Army officer, Governor of the Royal Military College Sandhurst
- William Ewart Napier (17 January 1881 in East Dulwich, Surrey – 6 September 1952 in Washington, D.C.) was an American chess master of English birth
- General Sir William Francis Patrick Napier (1785–1860), British Army officer and military historian
- William Henry Napier (1829–1894), Canadian artist and engineer
- William Rawdon Napier (1877–1951), Admiral of the Royal Navy

=== Titles of nobility ===
- Lord Napier
- Baron Napier of Magdala
- Napier baronets of Luton Hoo, Middle Marsh, Merchistoun, Merrion Square, and Punknoll

== Fictional persons ==
- Carson Napier, fictional hero of Edgar Rice Burroughs Venus series
- Declan Napier, fictional character from the Australian soap opera Neighbours
- India Napier, fictional character from the Australian soap opera Neighbours
- Jack Napier, fictional villain from Batman
- Rebecca Napier, fictional character from the Australian soap opera Neighbours
- Sean Napier, fictional character in Exosquad
- Major Napier, suspect in the film The Hindenburg
- Evelyn Napier, minor character in Downton Abbey
- Edie Napier, shopkeeper in Etrian Odyssey III: The Drowned City

== See also ==
- Bernard Glemser – British author who occasionally wrote under the pen name Geraldine Napier
- Grant Napear – American sports radio host and TV broadcaster in Sacramento, California
- Denise Nappier – American politician
