= Francis Napier =

Francis Napier may refer to:

- Francis Napier, 10th Lord Napier (1819–1898), Scottish polyglot, diplomat and colonial administrator
- Francis Napier, 15th Lord Napier (born 1962), Scottish nobleman
- Francis Napier, 6th Lord Napier (1702–1773), Scottish peer
- Francis Napier, 8th Lord Napier (1758–1823), British peer and army officer
- Francis Napier, 12th Lord Napier (1876–1941), British peer
