= Joseph Napier =

Joseph Napier may refer to:

- Sir Joseph Napier, 1st Baronet (1804–1882), Irish member of parliament in the United Kingdom Parliament and subsequently Lord Chancellor of Ireland
- Sir Joseph Napier, 2nd Baronet (1841–1884), Irish officer in the British Army
- Sir Joseph Napier, 4th Baronet (1895–1986), British baronet and soldier
- Joseph Napier (USCG) (c. 1826–1914), station keeper for the United States Life-Saving Service
  - USCGC Joseph Napier, a Sentinel-class cutter of the United States Coast Guard
