= William Napier =

William Napier may refer to:

- William Ewart Napier (1881–1952), American chess master
- William Francis Patrick Napier (1785–1860), British soldier and military historian
- William Napier (astronomer) (born 1940), astronomer and author
- William Napier, 9th Lord Napier (1786–1834), Royal Navy officer, politician and diplomat
- William Napier (novelist), historical novelist pseudonym of Christopher Hart
- William Napier (VC) (1828–1908), English recipient of the Victoria Cross
- William Napier (Royal Navy officer) (1877–1951), British admiral
- William Craig Emilius Napier (1818–1903), British general
- William Napier (lawyer) (1804–1879), Singapore lawyer and newspaper editor; Lieutenant-Governor of Labuan
- William Joseph Napier (1857–1925), member of parliament for Auckland, New Zealand
- William Napier, 11th Lord Napier (1846–1913), British peer
- William Napier, 13th Lord Napier (1900–1954), Scottish soldier and courtier
- William Napier, 7th Lord Napier (1730–1775), Scottish peer
- Sir William Napier, 3rd Baronet (1867–1915), British baronet and soldier

== See also ==
- William Napper (disambiguation)
