= Napier baronets of Merrion Square (1867) =

Escutcheon of the Napier baronets of Merrion Square

The Napier baronetcy, of Merrion Square in the County of Dublin, was created in the Baronetage of the United Kingdom on 9 April 1867 for the Conservative politician, and former Lord Chancellor of Ireland, Joseph Napier.

== Napier baronets, of Merrion Square (1867) ==
- Sir Joseph Napier, 1st Baronet (1804–1882)
- Sir Joseph Napier, 2nd Baronet (1841–1884)
- Sir William Lennox Napier, 3rd Baronet (1867–1915)
- Sir Joseph William Lennox Napier (1895–1986)
- Sir Robert Surtees Napier, 5th Baronet (1932–1994)
- Sir Charles Joseph Napier, 6th Baronet (born 1973)

The heir apparent is Finnian John Lennox Napier (born 2006), elder son of the 6th Baronet.
