= Napier baronets of Merchistoun (1627) =

Escutcheon of the Napier baronets of Merchistoun post-dormancy, quartering MacDowall and Milliken

The Napier baronetcy, of Merchistoun in the County of Midlothian, was created in the Baronetage of Nova Scotia on 2 March (or May) 1627 for Archibald Napier, son of John Napier the mathematician. Later that year he was raised to the Peerage of Scotland as Lord Napier.

The baronetcy became dormant in 1683 on the death of the 3rd Lord and 3rd Baronet, while the lordship passed to the late Lord's nephew. The baronetcy was successfully claimed in 1817 by the third Lord Napier's heir male general, the 8th Baronet. The 13th Baronet settled in South Africa, where the 14th Baronet lives in Benmore Gardens.

== Napier baronets, of Merchistoun (1627) ==
Escutcheon of Napier of Merchistoun

Escutcheon of Lord Napier

- Archibald Napier, 1st Lord Napier, 1st Baronet (c. 1575–1645)
- Archibald Napier, 2nd Lord Napier, 2nd Baronet (c. 1625–1660)
- Archibald Napier, 3rd Lord Napier, 3rd Baronet (died 1683)
- Alexander Napier, de jure 4th Baronet (died 1702)
- John Napier, de jure 5th Baronet (1686–1735)
- William Napier, de jure 6th Barone (died c. 1775)
- Robert John Milliken-Napier, de jure 7th Baronet (1765–1808)
- Sir William John Milliken-Napier, 8th Baronet (1788–1852)
- Sir Robert Milliken-Napier, 9th Baronet (1818–1884)
- Sir Archibald Lennox Milliken Napier, 10th Baronet (1855–1907)
- Sir Alexander Lennox Napier, 11th Baronet (1882–1954)
- Sir Robert Archibald Napier, MBE, 12th Baronet (1889–1965)
- Sir William Archibald Napier, 13th Baronet (1915–1990)
- Sir John Archibald Lennox Napier, 14th Baronet (born 1946).

The heir apparent is the present holder's only son Hugh Robert Lennox Napier (born 1977).
