= Clan Napier =

Lowland Scottish clan

- Crest: A dexter cubit arm, the hand grasping a crescent argent
- Motto: Sans tache (Without stain)

Profile
- District: Central Belt
- Plant badge: Heather

Chief
- The Rt. Hon. Francis David Charles Napier
- The 15th Lord Napier & 6th Baron Ettrick
- Historic seat: Merchiston Tower; Kilmahew Castle

Clan Napier is a Lowland Scottish clan.

== History ==
=== Origins of the clan ===
==== Traditional origins ====
Traditionally the Napiers are descended from the ancient Earls of Lennox who were one of the Celtic royal families of Scotland and Ireland. One theory holds that a "naperer" is "a person in charge of table linen in a royal or manor house" and that the original Napiers must have been "naperers" as an office for the royal household. However, there is not much evidence for this title being used in Scotland. Another origin for the name is that one of the knights of the Earl of Lennox, possibly a younger son of the earl, distinguished himself in battle in support of William the Lion. After the victory the king singled him out praising his valour by saying "nae peer".

In 1625, Sir Archibald Napier of Merchiston, the first Lord Napier, presented an affidavit to the College of Heralds, in which he described this origin of the name Napier, as having been bestowed by the king (probably Alexander II) on one Donald Lennox in recognition for acts of bravery. He states:

This battle went hard with the Scots, for the enemy, pressing furiously upon them, forced them to lose ground, until at last they fell to flat running away, which being perceived by Donald, he pulled his father's standard from the bearer thereof, and valiantly encountering the foe, being well followed by the Earl of Lenox's men, he repulsed the enemy, and changed the fortune of the day, whereby a great victory was got. After the battle as the manor is everyone advancing and setting forth his own acts the King said unto them "Ye have all done well but there is one amongst you who hath Na peer," and calling Donald into his presence he commanded him in regard of his worthy service and in augmentation of his honour to change his name from Lenox to Napier, and gave him the lands of Gosford and lands in Fife and made him his own servant, which discourse is confirmed by sundry of my old evidencies and testimonies wherein we are called Lenox alias Napier.

==== Recorded origins ====
The first certain reference to the name Napier is in a charter of Malcolm, Earl of Lennox some time before 1290, in which he granted lands to John de Naper in Kilmahew and Dunbartonshire. The Napiers held the lands at Kilmahew for eighteen generations until 1820.

=== 15th century and clan conflicts ===
The first Lord of Merchiston was Alexander Napier who was a prominent merchant in Edinburgh. He amassed a fortune and became Provost of Edinburgh. He obtained a charter for the lands of Merchiston in 1436. His son was Sir Alexander Napier, who also became Provost of Edinburgh and rose to high royal favour. He was wounded rescuing the widow of James I of Scotland and her second husband, Sir James Stewart, who had been captured by rebels. In 1440 Napier was honoured by James II of Scotland by being made Comptroller of the Royal Household and was later also made Vice Admiral of Scotland in 1461. His son was John Napier who was also the son-in-law of the Earl of Lennox who was executed in 1444. John did not press the family's claim to the earldom and was killed at the Battle of Sauchieburn in 1488.

=== 16th century and Anglo-Scottish Wars ===
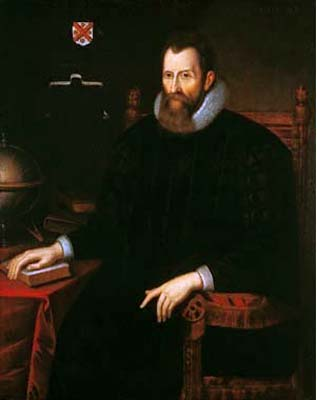
John Napier, 8th Laird of Merchiston, inventor of logarithms

John Napier's heir, Alexander, and also his grandson were both killed in 1513 at the Battle of Flodden. Another Napier heir was killed at the Battle of Pinkie Cleugh in 1547.

=== 17th century and Civil War ===
The most famous of the name was John Napier the seventeenth Laird of Merchiston who developed the system of Logarithm. In 1617 he was succeeded by his son, Archibald Napier, 1st Lord Napier who accompanied James VI and I to claim his new throne in England. Napier married the daughter of the fourth Earl of Montrose and sister of James Graham, 1st Marquess of Montrose. As the brother-in-law of the king's captain the Napiers supported the king throughout the Scottish Civil War. Lord Napier died in 1645 and his only son, Archibald Napier, 2nd Lord Napier, was forced into exile and died in the Netherlands in 1660.

Archibald Napier, 3rd Lord Napier petitioned to the Crown for a new patent to the barony and extended the succession to female heirs. The title passed to the only child of his eldest sister, Thomas Nicolson, 4th Lord Napier. The title then passed to his aunt, Margaret Napier, wife of John Brisbane who was Secretary to the Admiralty in the reign of Charles II of England. She was succeeded by her grandson, Francis Napier, 6th Lord Napier, who was originally Francis Scott but adopted the name and arms of Napier.

From a branch of this family passed to Portugal Christopher Naper, then Cristóvão Naper, nobleman who served John IV of Portugal in the wars against Spain. His son Francis Naper, then Francisco Naper, originary of Scotland, was Governor of Abrantes and married Dona Maria Coutinho, bastard daughter of Dom Álvaro Coutinho, who found himself at the Restoration of Bahia and Pernambuco, and wife Maria Sanches, native of Vilar Torpim, end of Castelo Rodrigo, who was of the good of the place. Dom Álvaro Coutinho was a bastard son of Dom Fernando Coutinho, fourth of the name, 9th and last Marshal of the Realm and Alcaide-Mor of the Castle of Pinhel, and Maria de Escovar, daughter of honoured farmers of Pinhel. Dom Francisco Naper - called by Dom maybe for the having the treatment of Sir, or just for being a foreign nobleman - had by his wife: Dom Francisco Naper (or Napier) de Lencastre, Captain of the Naus of India, where he went twice, Governor of the Nova Colónia of Rio de Janeiro, afterwards Field-Master of a Tercio in Alentejo, who came to die unmarried, without issue, at the Taking of Valencia de Alcántara, on 8 May 1705, during the War of the Spanish Succession; Dom Álvaro Coutinho de Lencastre, who married at the Madeira Island; Dona Madalena de Lencastre, wife of Francisco de Brito de Elvas, son of Heitor Mendes de Brito de Elvas, "the one of the Carmo", and first wife, who had no issue and after becoming a widow was a Nun at the Saviour Convent; Dona Guiomar de Lencastre, married to Francisco Aranha de Barros, Knight of the Habit of the Order of Christ, son of Gaspar Aranha de Barros and wife Guiomar de Brito, with issue; and Dona Luísa de Lencastre, Nun at the Monastery of Saint Anne, of Lisbon. The arms used by the Naper family, as much in England as in Portugal, are: argent, a saltire spiked gules, accompanied by four roses gules, open or; crest: an arm, dressed gules, rolled up argent, put in pale, with hand in carnation, holding a crescent argent.

=== Napoleonic Wars ===
Three grandsons of the sixth Lord Napier served throughout the Napoleonic Wars. General Sir Charles Napier conquered Sind in India, which is now part of Pakistan and his statue can still be seen in Trafalgar Square, London.

== Castles ==
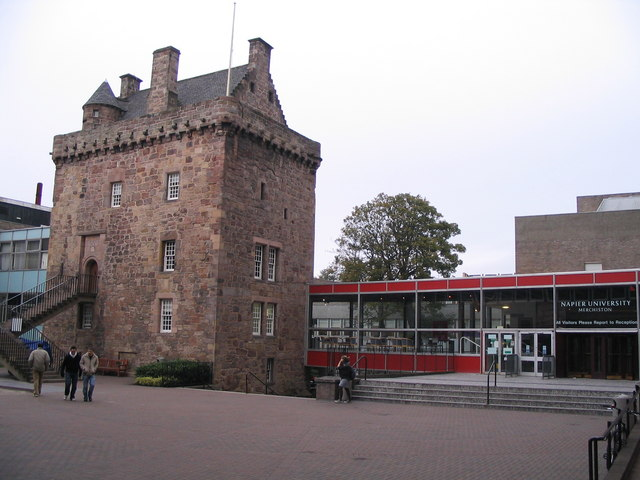
Merchiston Tower, historic seat of the chiefs of Clan Napier, in the centre of the campus of Edinburgh Napier University

- Kilmahew Castle, Cardross, Dunbartonshire, is the ancestral home of the Napiers of Kilmahew. It is now a ruin.
- Merchiston Tower, Edinburgh, is the ancestral home of the Napiers of Merchiston. It is the centre of the Merchiston Campus of Napier University.
- Other castles built or owned by the Napiers include Culcreuch Castle (Fintry, Stirlingshire) and Lauriston Castle (Edinburgh).

== Clan chief ==
The current chief of the clan is the Right Honourable Francis David Charles Napier, 15th Lord Napier, 6th Baron Ettrick, and 12th Baronet of Nova Scotia.

== Heraldry ==
The Clan Napier does not possess a coat of arms. In Scotland it is primarily individuals that are granted coats of arms. The arms of the Clan Chief, or to give him his full title, Chief of the Name and Arms of Napier are: Quarterly, 1st & 4th, Argent, a saltire engrailed cantoned of four roses Gules, barbed Vert; 2nd & 3rd, Or, on a bend Azure, a mullet pierced between two crescents of the Field, within a double tressure flory counterflory of the Second (see article on heraldry). The chief of the clan is the only person permitted to use these arms.

The original arms of Napier (as seen in the picture of John Napier on this page) were: Argent, a saltire engrailed between four roses gules, barbed vert. These arms bear striking similarity to the arms of the Clan Lennox (see origin of the clan, above, for explanation). The arms of the current chief are the Napier arms quartered with a differenced version of the Scott coat of arms, added when the Napier family absorbed the Scott Baronetcy of Thirlestane (see Lord Napier).

== See also ==
- Lord Napier
- Napier Baronets
- Napier (surname)
