= William Napier, 7th Lord Napier =

Scottish peer

- Born: 1730
- Died: 1775 (aged 44–45)
- Spouse: Mary Cathcart (m. 1754)
- Children: 2+, including Francis
- Father: Francis Napier
- Relatives: George Napier (half-brother); William Napier (grandson); Charles Hope (grandfather); William Scott (grandfather); Charles Napier (nephew); Thomas Napier (nephew)

William Napier, 7th Lord Napier (1730–1775) was a Scottish peer.

== Family ==
William Napier was the son of Francis Napier, 6th Lord Napier and Henrietta Hope (daughter of Charles Hope, 1st Earl of Hopetoun and Henrietta Hope, Countess of Hopetoun).

In 1754 he married Mary Cathcart, a daughter of Charles Cathcart, 8th Lord Cathcart, and they had a son, Francis Napier.

He achieved the title Lord Napier in 1773, two years before his death, at which point it passed to his son.

His daughter Mary (1756–1806) married Very Rev Andrew Hunter.

Peerage of Scotland
Preceded by Francis Napier	Lord Napier; 1773-1775	Succeeded by Francis Napier
