= John Napier (disambiguation) =

John Napier (1550–1617) was a Scottish mathematician, physicist and astronomer.

John Napier may also refer to:

- John Light Napier (born 1947), U.S. Representative from South Carolina
- John Napier (bobsleigh) (born 1986), American bobsledder
- John Napier (cricketer) (1859–1939), English clergyman and cricketer
- John Napier (designer) (born 1944), theatre set designer, recipient of many Tony and Olivier awards
- John Napier (footballer) (born 1946), Irish-born footballer and manager, notably with Bradford City A.F.C.
- John Napier, of the Scottish shipbuilding firm Robert Napier and Sons
- John R. Napier (1917–1987), primatologist from the University of London, founder of the Primate Society of Great Britain
- Sir John Napier, 4th Baronet (1636–1711), English landowner and politician

== See also ==
- Jack Napier (disambiguation)
