= Archibald Napier, 3rd Lord Napier =

Scottish noble

- Died: 1683
- Father: Archibald Napier
- Relatives: Margaret Napier (sister); Thomas Nicolson (nephew); Archibald Napier (grandfather)

Archibald Napier, 3rd Lord Napier (died 1683) was a Scottish peer.

== Family ==
Archibald Napier was a member of the Napier family of Merchiston, Scotland, and was the great-grandson of John Napier, the inventor of logarithms.

He was the son of Archibald Napier, 2nd Lord Napier and Lady Elizabeth Erskine, daughter of John Erskine, 19th Earl of Mar.

Archibald died unmarried and childless, but successfully petitioned for the barony to succeed to female heirs, including his sisters. The Lordship of Napier passed through his eldest sister Jean to his nephew, Thomas Nicolson, 4th Lord Napier, via this arrangement.

Peerage of Scotland
Preceded by Archibald Napier	Lord Napier; 1661–1683	Succeeded by Thomas Nicholson
Baronetage of Nova Scotia
Preceded by Archibald Napier	Baronet (of Merchistoun); 1660–1683	Vacant Title dormant
