= Nigel Napier, 14th Lord Napier =

Scottish lord and soldier (1930–2012)

Major The Right Honourable The Lord Napier KCVO, OStJ, DL

Member of the House of Lords
- Lord Temporal
- as a hereditary peer 1954 – 11 November 1999
- Preceded by: The 13th Lord Napier
- Succeeded by: Seat abolished (Note: Seat abolished by the House of Lords Act 1999.)

Personal details
- Born: Francis Nigel Napier; 5 December 1930
- Died: 15 March 2012 (aged 81)
- Parents: William Napier, 13th Lord Napier; Violet Muir Newson

Military service
- Allegiance: United Kingdom
- Branch/service: British Army
- Years of service: 1950–1958
- Rank: Major
- Unit: Scots Guards

Major (Francis) Nigel Napier, 14th Lord Napier, 5th Baron Ettrick, KCVO, OStJ, DL (5 December 1930 – 15 March 2012), was a Scottish soldier and courtier. He was the son of Lt.-Colonel William Napier, 13th Lord Napier and 4th Baron Ettrick, and Violet Muir Newson, daughter of Sir Percy Wilson Newson, 1st Bt.

Lord Napier was the hereditary clan chief of Clan Napier.

Educated at Eton and Sandhurst he was commissioned into the Scots Guards serving in Malaya in 1950. At the death of his father in 1954 he succeeded as 14th Lord Napier, 5th Lord Ettrick, and 11th baronet of Nova Scotia, as well as chief of the name and arms of Clan Napier. After retiring from the army he became an equerry to the Duke of Gloucester (1958–1960), then became temporary equerry to Princess Margaret in 1973 and Comptroller and Private Secretary to Princess Margaret (1975–1998) and Treasurer until her death in 2002.

Lord Napier married Delia Mary Pearson and they had four children:

- Hon. Louisa Mary Constance Napier (born 1961)
- Francis David Charles Napier, 15th Lord Napier and 6th Lord Ettrick (born 1962)
- Hon. Georgina Helena Katherine Napier (born 1969)
- Hon. Nicholas Alexander John Napier (born 1971)

He was appointed an Officer of the Order of St John in 1982.

== Notes ==
Baronetage of Nova Scotia
| Preceded by William Napier | Napier baronets (of Merchistoun); 1954–2012 | Succeeded by Francis Napier |
Peerage of Scotland
| Preceded by William Napier | Lord Napier; 1954–2012 | Succeeded by Francis Napier |
Peerage of the United Kingdom
| Preceded by William Napier | Baron Ettrick; 1954–2012; Member of the House of Lords (1954–1999) | Succeeded by Francis Napier |
