= David Napier =

David Napier may refer to:

- David Napier (precision engineer) (1785–1873), Scottish engineer
- David Napier (marine engineer) (1790–1869), Scottish marine engineer
- David Napier (director), director of The War of Jenkins Ear
