= Robert Napier =

Robert Napier may refer to:

== People ==
- Robert Napier (engineer) (1791–1876), Scottish marine engineer
- Sir Robert Napier (judge) (died 1615), English judge, Member of Parliament, Chief Baron of the Exchequer in Ireland
- Sir Robert Napier, 1st Baronet, of Luton Hoo (1560–1637), English merchant
- Sir Robert Napier, 2nd Baronet (c. 1603–1661), his son, Member of Parliament
- Robert Napier (British Army officer, died 1766), British Adjutant-General to the Forces
- Robert Napier, 1st Baron Napier of Magdala (1810–1890), British field marshal
- Sir Robert Napier, 1st Baronet, of Punknoll (1642–1700), English lawyer and politician
- Robert D. Napier (1821–1885), Scottish engineer
- Sir Robert Surtees Napier (1932–1994), British baronet and soldier

== Other uses ==
- Robert Napier and Sons, Scottish marine engineering and shipbuilding firm
- Robert Napier School, Gillingham, Kent

== See also ==
- John Napier (footballer) (born 1946), birth name Robert John Napier
