= William Napier, 11th Lord Napier =

British peer

- Born: 1846
- Died: 1913 (aged 66–67)
- Spouse(s): Harriet Lumb (m. 1867; died 1897) Grace Burns (m. 1898)
- Children: 2, including Francis
- Father: Francis Napier
- Relatives: Mark Napier (brother); William Napier (grandfather)

William John George Napier, 11th Lord Napier, 2nd Baron Ettrick (1846–1913) was a British peer.

== Family ==
William John George Napier was the son of Francis Napier, 10th Lord Napier and Anne Jane Charlotte Lockwood, daughter of Robert Manners Lockwood. In 1876 he married, firstly, Harriet Blake Armstrong Lumb (d. 1897), daughter of Edward Lumb of Wallington Lodge. They had two sons:

- Francis Edward Basil Napier, 12th Lord Napier, 3rd Baron Ettrick
- The Hon. Frederick William Scott Napier

In 1898 he married, secondly, Grace Burns, third daughter of James Cleland Burns, second son of Sir George Burns, 1st Baronet. With her, he had:

- The Hon. Archibald Lennox Colquhoun William George Napier

== Notes ==
Peerage of Scotland
| Preceded by Francis Napier | Lord Napier; 1898–1913 | Succeeded by Francis Edward Basil Napier |
Peerage of the United Kingdom
| Preceded by Francis Napier | Baron Ettrick; 1898–1913 | Succeeded by Francis Edward Basil Napier |
