= Napierała =

Napierała is a surname of Polish language origin, derived from the verb napierać (to press, to advance), "the one who presses on".

Emigrants could have shortened this surname to "Napier".

Notable people with this surname include:

- Bolesław Napierała (1909–1976), Polish cyclist
- Adrian Napierała (born 1982), Polish footballer
