= Jack Napier =

Jack Napier may refer to:

- Jack Napier (actor)
- Joker (Jack Napier), the real name of the Joker in the 1989 film Batman

== See also ==
- John Napier (disambiguation)
