= William Napier, 13th Lord Napier =

British Army officer and politician (1900–1954)

Lt. Col. The Lord Napier DL
- Born: William Francis Cyril James Hamilton Napier; 9 September 1900
- Died: 23 August 1954 (aged 53)
- Education: Wellington College
- Alma mater: Royal Military Academy Sandhurst
- Spouse: Violet Muir Newson (m. 1928; died 1954)
- Children: Nigel Napier, 14th Lord Napier; Hon. Charles Malcolm Napier; Hon. John Greville Napier; Hon. Hugh Lennox Napier
- Parent(s): Francis Napier, 12th Lord Napier; Hon. Clarice Hamilton

Lt. Col. William Francis Cyril James Hamilton Napier, 13th Lord Napier, 4th Baron Ettrick DL (9 September 1900 – 23 August 1954) was a Scottish soldier and courtier.

== Early life ==
He was the eldest son of Francis Napier, the 12th Lord Napier and his wife Hon. Clarice Jessie E. Hamilton, daughter of James Hamilton, 9th Lord Belhaven and Stenton. His brother, Hon. Neville Archibald John Watson Ettrick Napier, married Eileen Thorne (daughter of Hubert Prangley Thorne), in 1937.

He was educated at Wellington College and Sandhurst.

== Career ==
In 1920, he was commissioned into the King's Own Scottish Borderers, as a 2nd lieutenant, rising to the rank of lieutenant colonel by 1939. During this time, he served as the commanding officer of the 6th Battalion of the Scottish Borderers (from 1939 to 1941), as well as assistant adjutant general of the War Office (from 1943 to 1944 – under General Sir Ronald Adam). He was elected into the Royal Company of Archers in 1930, and held a number of political positions, including county councillor for Selkirkshire (from 1946 to 1948) and DL and JP for Selkirkshire.

Upon his father's death in 1941, he succeeded as Lord Napier and Ettrick and as chief of the name and arms of Clan Napier.

== Personal life ==
On 28 September 1928, he married Violet Muir Newson, a daughter of Sir Percy Newson, 1st Baronet and Helena Franklin (a daughter of Lt.-Col. Denham Franklin). Together, they had four children:

- Francis Nigel Napier, 14th Lord Napier (1930–2012), who married Delia Mary Pearson, daughter of Maj. Archibald David Barclay Pearson and Hilda Constance Helen Blackburn, in 1958.
- Hon. Charles Malcolm Napier (born 1933), who married Lady Mariota Cecilia Murray, a daughter of Mungo Murray, 7th Earl of Mansfield, in 1969.
- Hon. John Greville Napier (1939–1988), who married Juliet Elizabeth Hargreaves Durie, daughter of Sir Alexander Charles Durie and Joyce May Hargreaves, in 1968.
- Hon. Hugh Lennox Napier (1943–1996), a doctor who died unmarried.

Lord Napier died on 23 August 1954 and was succeeded by his eldest son, Nigel.

Peerage of Scotland
Preceded by Francis Napier	Lord Napier; 1941–1954	Succeeded by Nigel Napier
Peerage of the United Kingdom
Preceded by Francis Napier	Baron Ettrick; 1941–1954	Succeeded by Nigel Napier
