= Margaret Brisbane, 5th Lady Napier =

Scottish peer

- Died: 1706
- Spouse: John Brisbane
- Children: 1
- Father: Archibald Napier
- Relatives: Archibald Napier (brother); Thomas Nicolson (nephew); Francis Napier (grandson); Archibald Napier (grandfather)

Margaret Brisbane, 5th Lady Napier (died 1706) was a Scottish peer.

== Family ==
Margaret Brisbane (née Napier) was a member of the Napier family of Merchiston, Scotland, and was the great-granddaughter of John Napier, the inventor of logarithms.

She was the daughter of Archibald Napier, 2nd Lord Napier and Lady Elizabeth Erskine, daughter of John Erskine, 19th Earl of Mar.

Upon the death of her brother, Archibald Napier, 3rd Lord Napier, the title passed through her sister Jean to her nephew Thomas Nicolson, 4th Lord Napier. When he, too, died unmarried and without heir, the title passed to her.

She married John Brisbane, Secretary to the Admiralty in the reign of Charles II, and they had a daughter, Elizabeth Napier, Mistress of Napier, who in turn married Sir William Scott, 2nd Baronet of Thirlestane.

When she died in 1706, the title passed to her grandson, Francis Napier, 6th Lord Napier, who was 4 years old.

Peerage of Scotland
Preceded by Thomas Nicholson	Lady Napier; 1688–1706	Succeeded by Francis Napier
