= Echlin Molyneux =

Irish barrister and judge

Echlin Molyneux (c. 1800 – 1886) was an Irish barrister, Queen's Counsel, County Judge for Meath, Professor of Equity at Dublin Law Institute, Professor of English Law, then dean of the law faculty at Queen's University Belfast. He was instrumental in raising standards for legal practitioners through both the Law Institute and university education in Ireland, with a particular interest in equity.

== Life ==
He was the only son of James Molyneux and Anne Hathorne. He lived for many years in Bray, County Wicklow.

He retired to Bournemouth, where he died in 1886.

== Family ==
Echlin Molyneux married:

1. Mary Napier, daughter of William Napier and Rosetta MacNaghten and sister of Sir Joseph Napier (Lord Chancellor of Ireland), on 7 July 1828 and had one son, James Henry Molyneux. Mary Napier died in 1831.
2. Mary Osborne and had 2 daughters, Melinda and Elizabeth plus one son, Echlin.
3. Hannah Moore, daughter of Frederick Moore, and had 2 sons, Frederick and Evans plus one daughter, Sarah Frances.
