= Francis Sempill =

Scottish poet

Francis Sempill (c. 1616 – March 1682) was a Scottish poet, the son of Robert Sempill the younger.

No details of his education are known. His fidelity to the Stuarts involved him in money difficulties, to meet which he alienated portions of his estates to his son. Before 1677 he was appointed sheriff-depute of Renfrewshire. He died at Paisley in March 1682.

Sempill wrote many occasional pieces, and his fame as a wit was widespread. Among his most important works is the Banishment of Poverty, which contains some biographical details. The Blythsome Wedding, long attributed to Francis Sempill, has been more recently asserted to be the work of Sir William Scott of Thirlestane.

Sempill's claim to the authorship of the celebrated song "She raise and let me in", and of the ballad "Maggie Lauder", has been discussed at considerable length. It seems probable that he had some share in both.

"Maggie Lauder" is still fairly well known in Scotland. It has been performed by The Corries, Dick Gaughan, and the Tannahill Weavers.

Sempill married his cousin, Jean Campbell of Ardkinglas.
