= William Napper =

William Napper or Naper may refer to:

- William Napper (English cricketer) (1816–1897)
- William Napper (Irish cricketer) (1880–1967)
- William Naper (died 1683), Fellow of the Royal Society
- William Napper (MP for Trim) (1661–1708), Irish politician
- William Napper (MP for Athboy) (c. 1716–after 1760), Irish politician

== See also ==
- William Napier (disambiguation)
