= Francis Napier, 12th Lord Napier =

British peer

- Born: 1876
- Died: 1941 (aged 64–65)
- Spouse: Clarice Hamilton (m. 1899)
- Children: 2, including William
- Father: William Napier
- Relatives: Francis Napier (grandfather)
- Military career
- Rank: Captain
- Unit: King's Royal Rifle Corps
- Wars: World War I

Francis Edward Basil Napier, 12th Lord Napier, 3rd Baron Ettrick (1876–1941) was a British peer.

== World War I ==
During the First World War, Napier served as a captain in the 7th Battalion of the King's Royal Rifle Corps, but had unsuccessfully sought exemption from military service in May 1917. His application was rejected by Selkirk County Tribunal, owing to Napier not fulfilling a previous condition to perform munition work.

== Family ==
Francis Edward Basil Napier was the son of William John George Napier, 11th Lord Napier, 2nd Baron Ettrick and Grace Burns.

In 1899, he married Hon. Clarice Jessie E. Hamilton, daughter of James Hamilton, 9th Lord Belhaven and Stenton, and they had:

- William Francis Cyril James Hamilton Napier, who succeeded him as 13th Lord Napier
- The Hon. Neville Archibald John Watson Ettrick Napier, Lt. Commander in the Royal Navy.

Peerage of Scotland
Preceded by William John Napier	Lord Napier; 1913–1941	Succeeded by William Francis Napier
Peerage of the United Kingdom
Preceded by William John Napier	Baron Ettrick; 1913–1941	Succeeded by William Francis Napier
