= Montague Napier =

British automobile pioneer

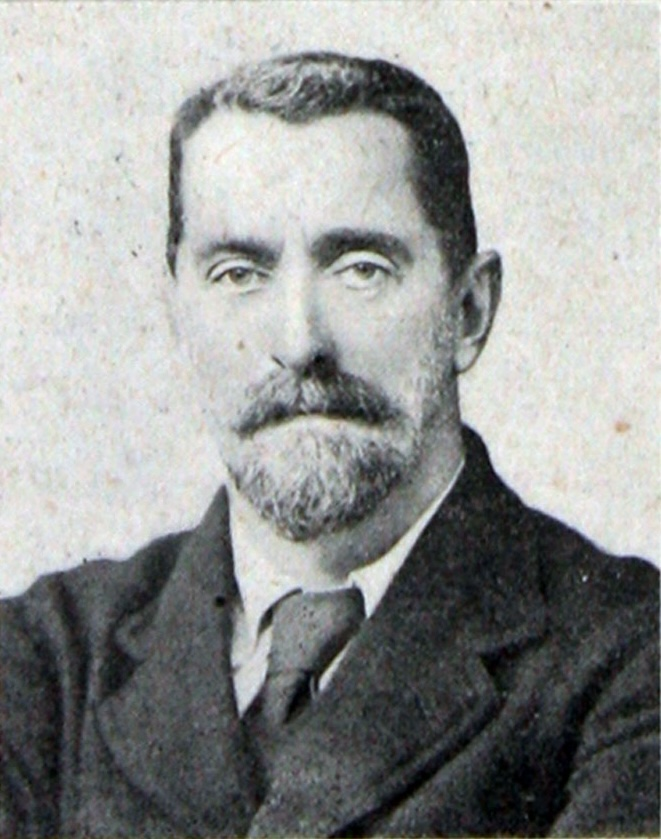
- Photo in February 1921
- Born: April 14, 1870; England
- Died: January 22, 1931 (aged 60); France
- Occupation(s): Automobile and aircraft engine manufacturer

Montague Stanley Napier (14 April 1870 – 22 January 1931) was an English automobile and aircraft engine manufacturer. His grandfather, David Napier (1785–1873), had moved to London from Scotland and by 1836 had established an engineering company in Lambeth called D. Napier & Son. Montague Napier bought the business from the executors of his father's estate in 1895, and diversified into producing machine tools for the cycle industry.

Following a meeting with businessman and racing driver Selwyn Edge in 1899 Napier diversified into automobile manufacturer, and for a time his company was the leading supplier of luxury cars in the British market. His focus switched from cars to aircraft engines after the outbreak of the First World War in 1914, and he developed the very successful Lion engine.

Napier's health broke down in 1915 and he chose to move to the south of France, but he continued to work as a design consultant for his company. He died at his home in Cannes on 22 January 1931, aged 60.

== Early life ==
Motor historian Peter King describes Napier as "very secretive by nature"; not much is known about his early life. He was born on 14 April 1870 at 68 York Road, Lambeth, London, the youngest of the four sons of James Murdoch Napier and his wife, Fanny Jemima, née Mackenzie. His father had taken over his own father's interest in the engineering business he had set up there by 1836, making printing machinery for the newspaper industry. The business diversified unto making coin-weighing machines for the Royal Mint, but by the time of James Murdoch Napier's death in 1895 it was in decline. Napier had worked in the family business from an early age, but he was not doing so at the time of his father's death. He bought the business from the executors of his father's estate and diversified into producing machine tools for the cycle industry. As an avid racing cyclist he had been participating in races of the North Road Cycling Club alongside riders like Selwyn Edge. In the 1891 100 Mile Road Race on the Great North Road he finished fourth.

== Business career ==
Napier met Selwyn Edge again in 1899, for whom he agreed to build a car based on Edge's Panhard et Levassor, which he had bought after it came second in the 1896 Paris–Marseilles race. So impressed was Edge with the result that he contracted to buy six more cars, and set up a showroom in London from which to sell them. The first cars were ready by 1900, and so successful were they that Napier decided to move his company to larger premises in Acton, London. While Napier concentrated on the engineering Edge focused on the marketing and publicity. In 1902 he drove a Napier to victory in that year's Gordon Bennett Cup, the first British victory in an international motor race. Napier cars dominated the British luxury car market until 1906, but Napier was unconvinced that there was a sustainable long-term market for such vehicles, unlike Rolls-Royce, his main competitor. Napier therefore set up a new company to develop more popular cars.

Following the outbreak of the First World War in 1914 Napier's interest turned increasingly to aircraft engines. Initially Napier's built engines designed by the Royal Aircraft Factory, but at his own expense Napier subsequently designed his own, the Lion. By 1924 about half of all British aircraft were powered by Napier's engine, and Napier automobile production had ceased.

== Later life ==
Napier's health had broken down by 1915, probably as a result of cancer, and he moved to the south of France from where he continued working as a consultant to his company. He was unable to design a satisfactory successor to the Lion, and therefore Napier was overtaken in the aero-engine market by Bristol and Rolls-Royce.

In 1903 he had married school governess Alice Caroline Mary, née Paterson, with whom he had two sons and two daughters; the couple were legally separated in 1922.

In early 1930 he had commissioned Camper and Nicholsons to build him a new large twin-screw motor yacht. Launched shortly after his death in February 1931 as Yard Number 388, she ran trials in June and was subsequently registered at Southampton with that name, and official number 161735. In December 1931 the yacht was sold for £50,000 to Richard Fairey of Fairey Aviation, and renamed Evadne.

Napier died at his home in Cannes, Villa des Cistes, on 22 January 1931, aged 60. The income from his estate of more than £1 million was left to his nurse and reputed mistress, Norah Mary Fryer, for the duration of her life, after which the residue of the estate was to be given to cancer research.
