= William Scott of Thirlestane =

Scottish lawyer (c.1670–1725)

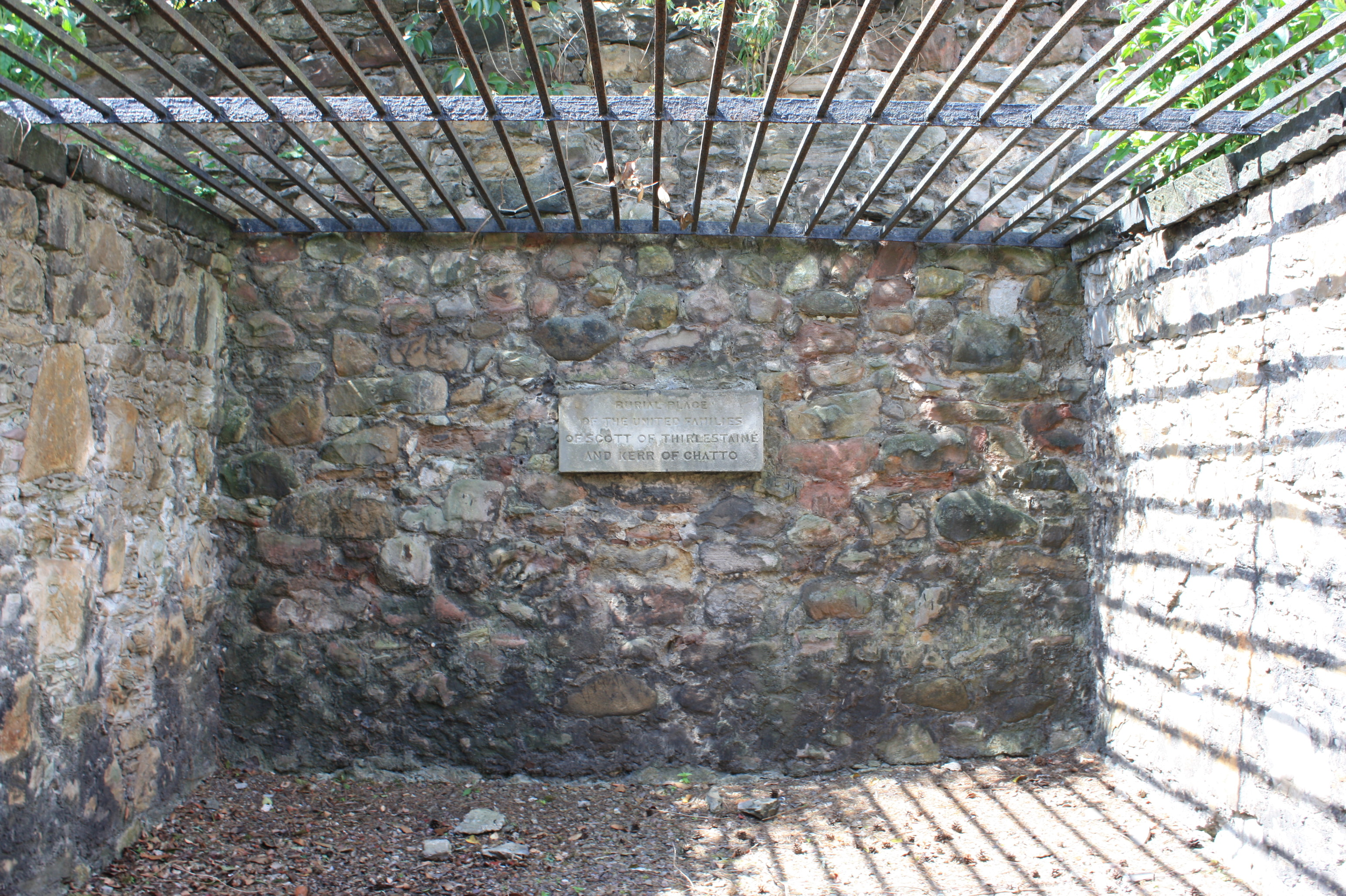
The austere vault of the Scotts of Thirlestane, Greyfriars Kirkyard, built to defend against grave-robbing

Sir William Scott, 2nd Baronet of Thirlestane (c.1670 – 8 October 1725) was a Scottish lawyer, known as a Neo-Latin poet.

== Life ==
He was the eldest son of Francis Scott, 1st Baronet of Thirlestane, Selkirkshire, and Lady Henrietta, daughter of William Kerr, 3rd Earl of Lothian, who married in 1673. Francis built a large tenement in Edinburgh in 1679 at Elphinstone Court near the Scottish mint.

William trained as a lawyer in Edinburgh and was admitted a member of the Faculty of Advocates on 25 February 1702.

On 20 May 1719 Scott executed a deed of entail of his lands of Thirlestane.

Thirlestane in Selkirkshire should not be confused with Thirlestane in Roxburghshire, which is associated with the Kerrs, and later the Scott-Kerrs of Chatto and Sunlaws. Such confusion has led to the assumption that the Kerrs of Chatto are buried in Greyfriars. This is not the case. The Kerrs and Scott-Kerrs of Chatto and Sunlaws are buried at Sunlaws and Roxburgh, and possibly Hownam.

He died on 8 October 1725. He is buried in the sealed south-west section of Greyfriars Kirkyard in Edinburgh commonly called the Covenanter's Prison.

== Works ==
Scott contributed to Archibald Pitcairne's Selecta Poemata (1726) some lyrics and macaronic verse; in the preface to the volume his literary merits are extolled by contemporaries.

A family tradition attributed to him the ballad, The Blythsome Wedding, which was also claimed for Francis Sempill, by James Paterson (1849). Allan MacLaine considers neither attribution of this anonymous work to have merit.

== Family ==
In 1699, Scott married Elizabeth, only surviving child of Margaret Brisbane, 5th Lady Napier, and her husband, John Brisbane, son of an Edinburgh writer. After her death he married Jean, daughter of Sir John Nisbet of Dirleton, East Lothian, and widow of Sir William Scott of Harden. Francis Scott, son of the first marriage, became the sixth Lord Napier on the death of his grandmother, who was predeceased by his mother.

== Notes ==
Attribution

This article incorporates text from a publication now in the public domain: Lee, Sidney, ed. (1897). "Scott, William (1674?-1725)". Dictionary of National Biography. Vol. 51. London: Smith, Elder & Co.

Baronetage of Nova Scotia
Preceded by Francis Scott	Baronet (of Thirlestane); 1712–1725	Succeeded by Francis Napier
