= Sir William Napier, 3rd Baronet =

Sir William Lennox Napier
- Born: 12 October 1867; England
- Died: 13 August 1915 (aged 47); Chunuk Bair, Gallipoli, Ottoman Turkey
- Occupation: Baronetage of Merrion Square
- Spouse: Lady Mabel E. G. Napier (née Forster)

Lieutenant Colonel Sir William Lennox Napier, 3rd Baronet of Merrion Square (12 October 1867 – 13 August 1915) was a British baronet and soldier.

== Career ==
Napier joined the Sussex Artillery Volunteers in 1888. He was commander of the 7th Battalion, Royal Welch Fusiliers, as part of the Territorial Army.

Napier succeeded to the Baronetage of Merrion Square in 1884 on the death of his father, Sir Joseph Napier, 2nd Baronet (1841–1884), and was succeeded by his son, Sir Joseph William Lennox Napier, 4th Baronet (1895–1986).

Napier retired from the Territorial Army in 1912 but offered his services on the outbreak of the First World War in August 1914, and was commissioned as a major, 4th South Wales Borderers, on 24 September 1914 in command of "A" Company. He was killed by a sniper on 13 August 1915 at Chunuk Bair during the Gallipoli campaign in Ottoman Turkey, aged 47, and is buried in 7th Field Ambulance Cemetery.

== Personal life ==
Napier was married to Lady Mabel E. G. Napier (née Forster).

Baronetage of the United Kingdom
Preceded by Joseph Napier	Baronet (of Merrion Square); 1884–1915	Succeeded by Joseph William Lennox Napier
