= David Napier (precision engineer) =

Scottish engineer (1787–1873)

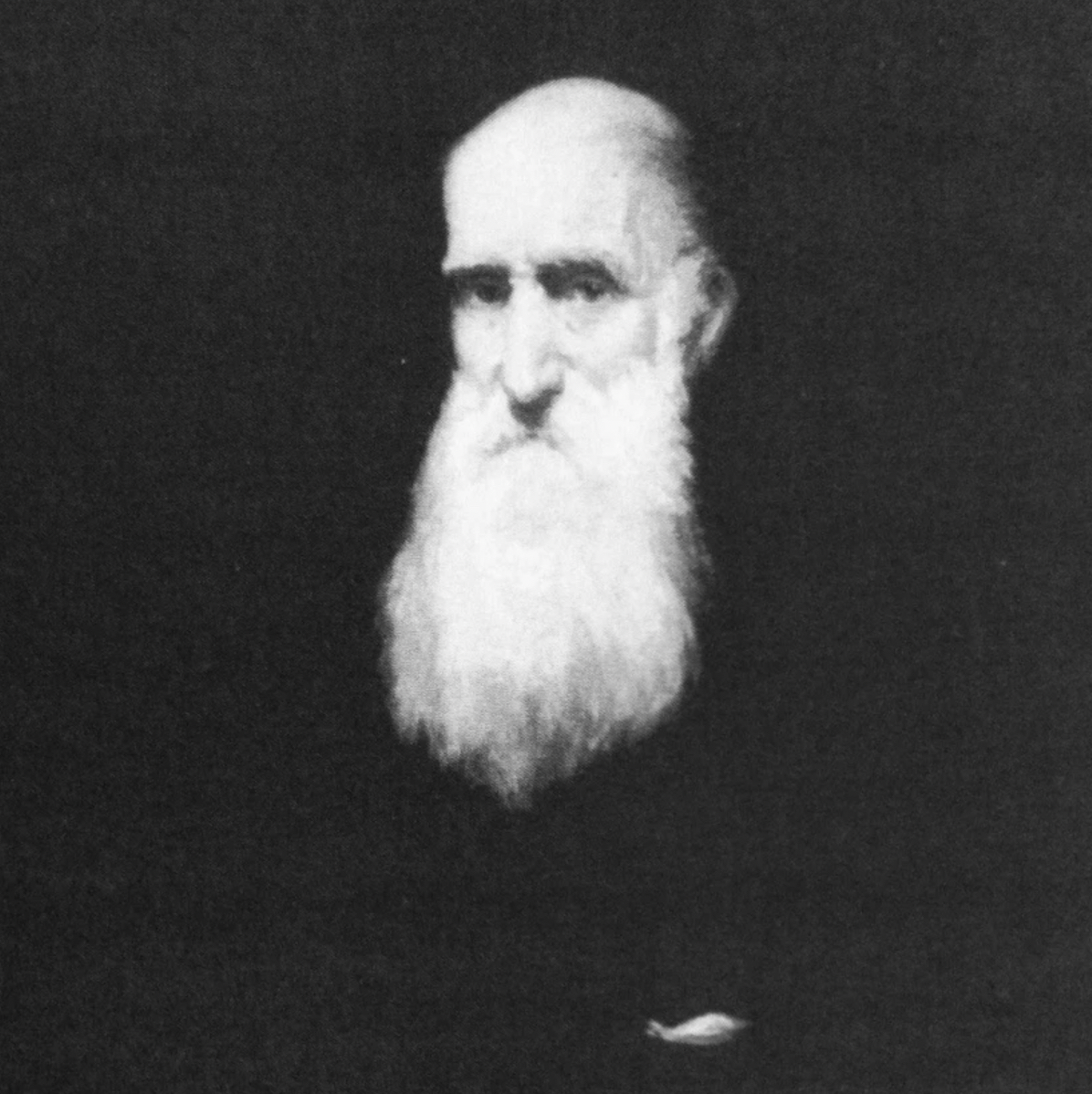
- Born: 1787; Dumbarton, Scotland
- Died: 17th June 1873 (aged 86); Lambeth, London
- Occupation: Precision Engineer
- Known for: Founder of Napier & Son
- Family: Robert Napier (cousin), Montague Napier (grandson)

David Napier (1787–1873) was a Scottish engineer, notable for founding Napier & Son, an early automotive and aero-engine company.

== Biography and career ==
David Napier was born in Dumbarton to a family of engineers (the Kilmahew branch of the Napier family). He was the son of Robert Napier (1726–1790), and cousin of another Robert Napier – known as the "Father of Clyde Shipbuilding." One of David Napier's uncles had served as a blacksmith for the Duke of Argyll.

He eventually moved south, and worked for Henry Maudslay before founding his own precision engineering company in 1808 in Soho, London. In 1848, it became D. Napier & Son, when he added his son James Napier to the business partnership.

The company produced machines for bullet-making, gun-boring and turning for a number of government arsenals, as well as coin-weighing machines for the Bank of England, two-cylinder printing presses (designed to print simultaneously on both sides of a sheet of paper) and a centrifuge for sugar manufacturing. His machines were described as "delicate as any clock could be", and his printing press in particular earned praise by Thomas Curson Hansard.

After his death his grandson Montague Napier, would make the company famous for first motor vehicles and later aero engines.
