= Robert Surtees Napier =

Sir Robert Surtees Napier, 5th Baronet of Merrion Square, (5 March 1932 – 2 July 1994), was a British baronet and soldier.

He succeeded to the Baronetage of Merrion Square in 1986 on the death of his father Sir Joseph William Lennox Napier, 4th Baronet (1895–1986), and was succeeded by his son Sir Charles Joseph Napier, 6th Baronet in 1994.

Baronetage of the United Kingdom
Preceded by Joseph William Lennox Napier	Baronet (of Merrion Square); 1986–1994	Succeeded by Charles Joseph Napier
