= Irene Napier =

Scottish make-up designer

- Born: Irene Marquis Brownlie; 1 October 1953 (age 72); Glasgow, Scotland
- Occupation: Make-up artist

Irene Napier is a film and television make-up designer from Scotland.

== Education ==
Napier trained in hairdressing at the Central College of Commerce, qualifying in 1974.

== Career ==
Later in 1974, Napier joined Scottish Television as a trainee make-up artist and remained there for 13 years, eventually gaining the position of make-up designer before leaving in 1987 to become a freelance. While at STV she worked on news, entertainment, current affairs and drama programmes including Garnet Way, House on the Hill, Taggart and Take the High Road. She was make-up designer on the feature film version of Jimmy Boyle's autobiography A Sense of Freedom.

=== Freelance ===
In the early years of her freelance career, Napier specialised in high-profile TV drama and low-budget films, notably Tickets for the Zoo, A Life of Stuff, Regeneration, Taggart, Finney, Cardiac Arrest and the television adaptation of Iain Banks's bestselling Crow Road.

=== London ===
In the mid-1990s Napier began working in London on larger-scale television drama, most notably as make-up designer on the BBC's flagship hospital soap, Holby City. She was also designer on Down to Earth, The Inspector Linley Mysteries, ITV's highly successful Bad Girls and the BBC's 2007 summer drama Jekyll. During this time she periodically returned to Scotland in order to spend more time at home while working on Quite Ugly One Morning, 2000 Acres of Sky and the hugely popular Monarch of the Glen.

== Awards ==
In 2000 Irene received a Scottish BAFTA award for outstanding achievement in her field.
