= Thomas Nicolson, 4th Lord Napier =

Scottish peer

- Born: 14 January 1669
- Died: 9 June 1688 (aged 19)
- Relatives: Archibald Napier (uncle); Margaret Napier (aunt); Archibald Napier (grandfather)

Thomas Nicholson of Carnock, 4th Lord Napier (14 January 1669 – 9 June 1688) was a Scottish peer.

== Family ==
Thomas Nicholson of Carnock was the son of Jean Napier (sister to Archibald Napier, 3rd Lord Napier) and her husband Sir Thomas Nicolson, 3rd Baronet of Carnock (1649–1670). The Nicolson Baronetage, of Carnock, passed to him at the death of his father in 1670. He also received the title Lord Napier through his mother, upon the death of his uncle the 3rd Lord Napier in 1683. He died in 1688, unmarried and childless. Upon his death, the Lordship passed to his aunt Margaret Brisbane, 5th Lady Napier, and the Carnock estate and the baronetcy passed to his paternal aunts.

Peerage of Scotland
Preceded by Archibald Napier	Lord Napier; 1683–1688	Succeeded by Margaret Brisbane
Baronetage of Nova Scotia
Preceded by Thomas Nicolson	Baronet (of Carnock); 1670–1688	Succeeded by Thomas Nicolson
