= Archibald Napier, 2nd Lord Napier =

Scottish peer

- Born: c. 1625
- Died: 1660 (aged 34–35); Delfshaven, County of Holland, Dutch Republic
- Spouse: Elizabeth Erskine
- Children: 5, including Archibald and Margaret
- Father: Archibald Napier
- Relatives: John Napier (grandfather); John Graham (grandfather)

Archibald Napier, 2nd Lord Napier (c. 1625–1660) was a Scottish peer and the grandson of John Napier of Merchiston.

== Biography ==
Archibald Napier was the son of the 1st Lord Napier.

As a nephew of James Graham, 1st Marquess of Montrose, Napier supported him in his Royalist endeavours. When Montrose left Scotland for Norway in 1646, Napier accompanied him. When Montrose returned, Napier stayed in Germany and Belgium.

When in 1650 he sought to return to his home in Scotland, he asked permission of King Charles to rejoin his uncle, and this was granted. However, before he could return, Montrose was captured, tried and executed. Lord Napier decided against returning to Scotland.

Due to his unflagging Royalist support, he was excepted from Cromwell's Act of Grace on 12 April 1654 and his lands were confiscated by the Commonwealth. He died in the Netherlands at Delfsham (Delfshaven) in the County of Holland at the beginning of 1660, so did not live to see the Restoration.

== Family ==
Archibald Napier was a member of the Napier family of Merchiston, Scotland, and the grandson of John Napier, the inventor of logarithms.

Around 1642 he married Lady Elizabeth Erskine (d. 1683), the eldest daughter of John Erskine, 19th (or 3rd) Earl of Mar.

Elizabeth Erskine was a prisoner in Edinburgh Castle in August 1645 with her sister-in-law Lilias Napier.

They had five children:

- Archibald (d. 1683), who succeeded as 3rd Lord Napier.
- John (d. 1672)
- Jean, who married Sir Thomas Nicolson of Carnock, whose son, Thomas (1669–1686), became the fourth Lord Napier.
- Margaret (d. 1706), who became Lady Napier, fifth holder of the title in her own right (whose grandson, Francis (1702–1773), became the sixth holder of the title as the sixth Lord Napier).
- Mary, who died unmarried.

Peerage of Scotland
Preceded by Archibald Napier	Lord Napier; 1645–1660	Succeeded by Archibald Napier
