= Sir Joseph Napier, 4th Baronet =

Lieutenant Colonel Sir Joseph William Lennox Napier, 4th Baronet of Merrion Square, OBE (1 August 1895 – 13 October 1986) was a British baronet and soldier who served in both the First and Second World Wars.

Napier married Isabelle Muriel Surtees (daughter of Major Henry Surtees) on 12 February 1931. He succeeded to the Baronetage of Merrion Square in 1915 on the death of his father, Sir William Napier, 3rd Baronet (1867–1915), and was succeeded by his son, Sir Robert Surtees Napier, 5th Baronet (1932–1994).

Baronetage of the United Kingdom
Preceded by William Lennox Napier	Baronet (of Merrion Square); 1915–1986	Succeeded by Robert Surtees Napier
