= Sir Joseph Napier, 2nd Baronet =

Sir Joseph Napier, 2nd Baronet (28 May 1841 – 13 November 1884) was an Irish Captain 23rd Royal Welch Fusiliers.

He was the son of Sir Joseph Napier, 1st Baronet and Charity (Cherry) Grace, and was born in Dublin, Ireland. His father was a leading politician and barrister who was briefly Lord Chancellor of Ireland in 1858–59. Joseph had an elder brother William, who died prematurely in 1874, to his parents' great grief.

He married Maria Octavier Mortimer on 10 November 1864 and had two sons: William Lennox Napier(1867–1915) and Joseph Duncan Mortimer Napier (1871–1900).

Baronetage of the United Kingdom
Preceded by Joseph Napier	Baronet (of Merrion Square); 1882–1884	Succeeded by William Lennox Napier
