= USCGC Joseph Napier =

USCGC Joseph Napier (WPC-1115)
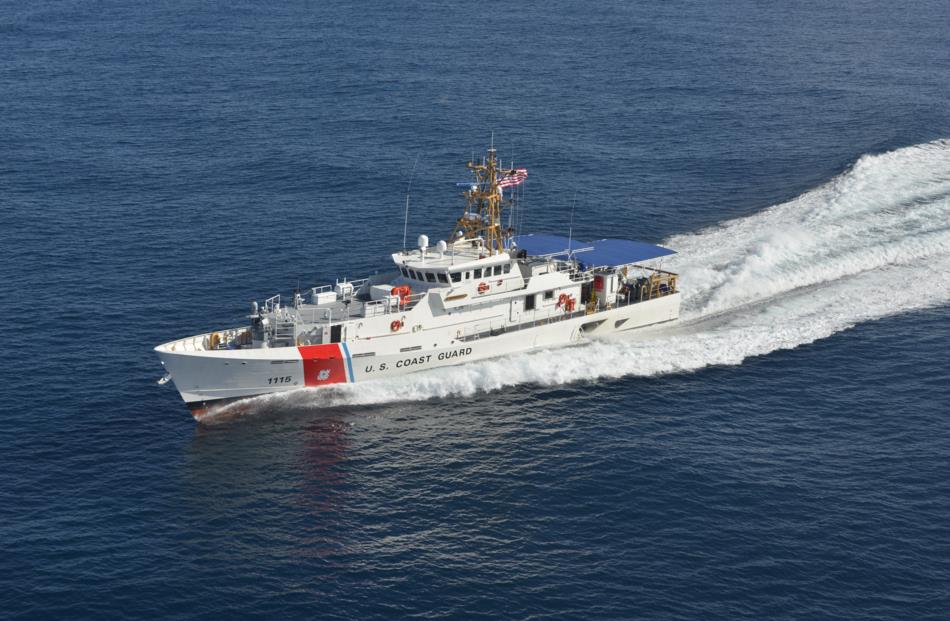
- Joseph Napier at speed

History

United States
- Namesake: Joseph Napier
- Builder: Bollinger Shipyards, Lockport, Louisiana
- Launched: 20 October 2015
- Acquired: 20 October 2015
- Commissioned: 29 January 2016
- Home port: San Juan, Puerto Rico
- Identification: MMSI number: 338926415; Callsign: NDOC; Hull number: WPC-1115
- Motto: Failure is not an option
- Status: in active service
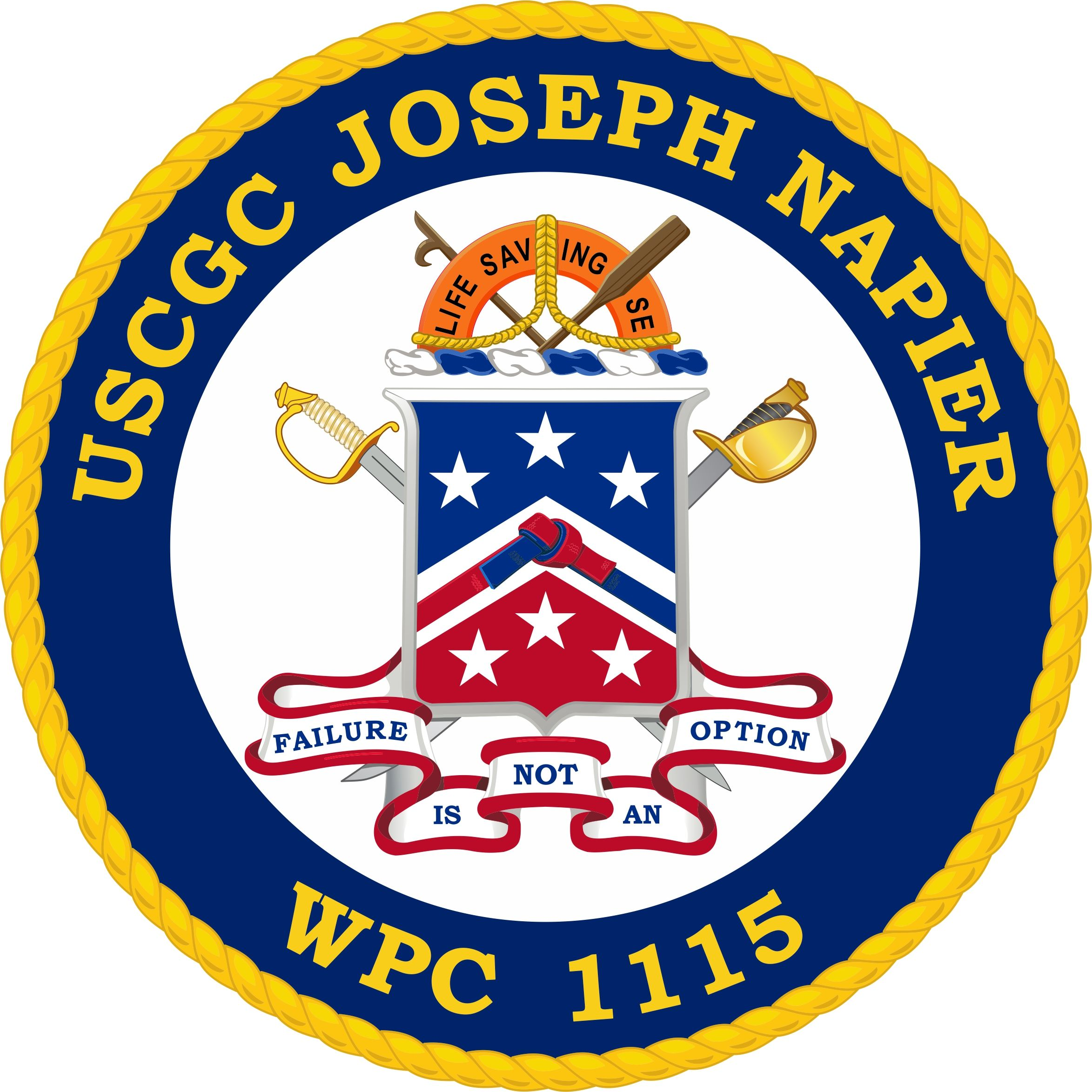
- Badge

General characteristics
- Class & type: Sentinel-class cutter
- Displacement: 353 long tons (359 t)
- Length: 46.8 m (154 ft)
- Beam: 8.11 m (26.6 ft)
- Depth: 2.9 m (9.5 ft)
- Propulsion: 2 × 4,300 kW (5,800 shp); 1 × 75 kW (101 shp) bow thruster
- Speed: 28 knots (52 km/h; 32 mph)
- Endurance: 5 days, 2,500 nmi (4,600 km; 2,900 mi); Designed to be on patrol 2,500 hours per year
- Boats & landing craft carried: 1 × Short Range Prosecutor RHIB
- Complement: 2 officers, 20 crew
- Sensors & processing systems: L-3 C4ISR suite
- Armament: 1 × Mk 38 Mod 2 25 mm automatic gun; 4 × Browning M2 .50 cal machine guns; Various small arms

USCGC Joseph Napier is a Sentinel-class cutter homeported in San Juan, Puerto Rico. She is the fifteenth Sentinel class to be delivered, and the third of six to be assigned to Puerto Rico. She was commissioned on 29 January 2016.

Like her sister ships, she is equipped for coastal security patrols, interdiction of drug and people smugglers, and search and rescue. Like the smaller Marine Protector class she is equipped with a stern launching ramp. The ramp allows the deployment and retrieval of her high speed water-jet powered pursuit boat without first coming to a stop. She is capable of more than 25 knots (46 km/h; 29 mph) and armed with a remote controlled 25 millimetres (0.98 in) M242 Bushmaster autocannon; and four crew-served Browning M2 machine guns.

== Operational history ==
Joseph Napier intercepted a fishing vessel in February 2017, that was attempting to smuggle over four tons of cocaine. Lady Michelle's crew of four individuals from Guyana were taken to the U.S. Virgin Islands, for prosecution. The cocaine's street value was estimated at US$125 million.

== Namesake ==
She is named after Joseph Napier, who had commanded a lifeboat station at St. Joseph, Michigan. Napier was an employee of the United States Lifeboat Service, one of the precursor services that were amalgamated into the Coast Guard.
