= Joseph Napier (USCG) =

United States Life-Saving Service station keeper

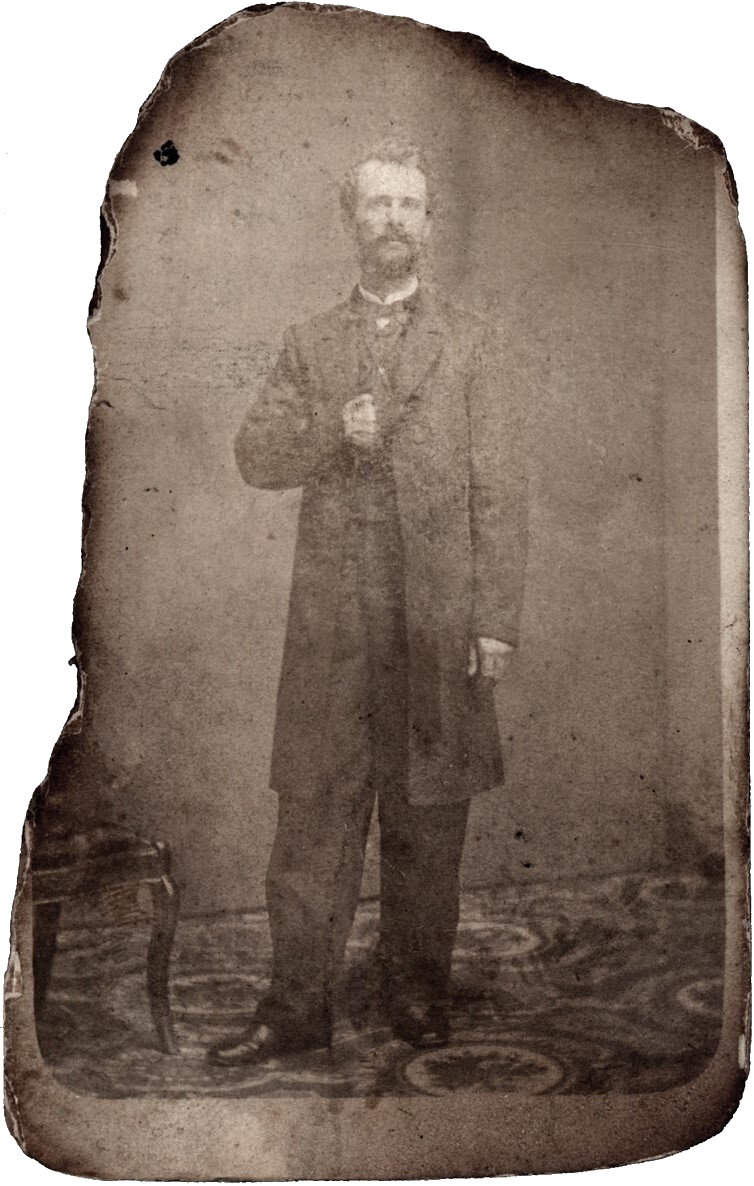
- Born: c. 1826; Ashtabula, Ohio
- Died: 1914 (aged 88); St. Joseph, Michigan
- Military career
- Branch: United States Life-Saving Service

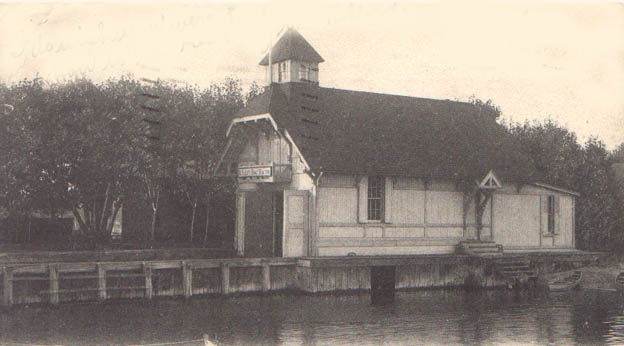
Original St Joseph boathouse – station keepers like Napier were expected to sleep in their boathouses.

Joseph Napier, a station keeper for the United States Life-Saving Service founded the lifesaving station at St. Joseph, Michigan in 1876. He operated the station for many years and was credited with many dangerous and heroic rescues.

Napier was born in Ashtabula, Ohio, the son of a Great Lakes ship's captain. Prior to joining the Life-Saving Service, he was Chicago`s harbormaster, and a ship's captain himself. While in Chicago, in 1854, Napier led the rescue of the crew of a wrecked schooner, and was awarded an inscribed gold watch.

The duties of a station-keeper included recruiting and training a boat crew of local volunteers, and, when vessel was a risk, to lead the boat crew in rowing to stricken vessels to rescue their crews. The station-keeper and his crew were expected to try to rescue mariners even if it meant rowing into gale-force winds, shattering waves, and dangerous currents. The rescue boat would be kept on a wagon in a special boat house. During a rescue the crew would tow the wagon with the boat to the nearest relatively safe place to launch.

In one heroic rescue, on his crew's third transit to a stricken schooner, Napier was thrown overboard and seriously injured his leg. He was nevertheless able to lead his crew to rescue the last two stricken seamen. Napier was awarded the Gold Lifesaving Medal for his heroism.

After retirement, Napier continued to live in St. Joseph on a street that bore his surname. It was named Napier Avenue in honor of his older brother Nelson Napier, who was captain of the PS Alpena when she sank on Lake Michigan with no survivors in October 1880. Joseph Napier died at his home in 1914 at the age of 88.

== USCGC Joseph Napier ==
In 2010 when the Coast Guard decided that all the new Sentinel class cutters would be named after Coast Guard personnel who had been recognized for their heroism Napier was one of those to be honored. The fifteenth cutter in the class will be named the USCGC Joseph Napier. She will be homeported in San Juan, Puerto Rico.
