= John Napier (cricketer) =

English clergyman & cricketer (1859–1939)

John Russell Napier (5 January 1859 – 12 March 1939) was an English clergyman and a cricketer who played first-class cricket for Cambridge University in 1881 and for Lancashire in 1888. He was born at Preston, Lancashire and died at Bexhill, East Sussex.

Napier was educated at Marlborough College and at Trinity College, Cambridge. He was captain of the cricket eleven at Marlborough and played in trial matches at Cambridge in both 1879 and 1880, but did not appear in any first-class games in those years; as a cricketer, he was a lower-order right-handed batsman and a right-arm fast bowler in the round-arm style. Napier finally appeared in first-class cricket in 1881 and did well in his first match for Cambridge University, taking five wickets in a high-scoring match against the Gentlemen of England and scoring 14 in his only innings. In his second match, the game against Lancashire at the Aigburth cricket ground in Liverpool he took only one wicket before being injured: a contemporary report stated that "Mr. Napier strained himself through his tremendously swift bowling and had to leave the field".

Napier graduated from Cambridge University with a Bachelor of Arts degree in 1882 and was ordained as a priest in the Church of England. He was curate at Leigh in Lancashire from 1883 to 1886 and then for four years at St Paul's Church, Preston, Lancashire. While working in Lancashire, he played two matches for the county cricket team in 1888. In the first, against the touring Australians, Napier scored 7 and 37 – the second innings score was the highest by a Lancashire player in the match – and took seven wickets in the game as Lancashire won by just 23 runs. His second match for Lancashire was the Roses Match against Yorkshire at Sheffield; with no play possible on the first two days of a three-day game, Napier was put on to bowl late in the Yorkshire innings and took four wickets in 14 balls without conceding a run to finish the innings. He did not play first-class cricket again.

Napier's church career took him away from Lancashire. He was vicar of Walsden, West Yorkshire from 1890 to 1906, then rector of North Fambridge in Essex to 1911 and finally vicar of Old Windsor, Berkshire up to his retirement in 1928. He retired to Bexhill in Sussex where he died.
