= Francis Napier, 8th Lord Napier =

British peer and army officer

- Born: 23 February 1758; Ipswich, Suffolk, England
- Died: 1 August 1823 (aged 65); Enfield, London, England
- Spouse: Maria Clavering (m. 1784)
- Children: 9, including William
- Father: William Napier
- Relatives: Francis Napier (grandfather); Charles Cathart (grandfather)
- Military career
- Service: British Army
- Rank: Major
- Unit: 31st Foot
- Commands: 35th Foot; 4th Foot
- Wars: American Revolutionary War

Francis Scott Napier, 8th Lord Napier (23 February 1758 – 1 August 1823) was a British peer and army officer.

== Biography ==
Napier was born in Ipswich in 1758, the son of William Napier (later 7th Lord Napier) and his wife, Mary, a daughter of Charles Cathcart, 8th Lord Cathcart.

Inheriting his father's title on 2 January 1775, Napier was earlier commissioned into the 31st Foot in 1774 and was promoted to a lieutenant in 1776. After serving with General Burgoyne in Canada, he fought in the American Revolutionary War with the Convention Army under Burgoyne at the time of their defeat and surrender at the Battle of Saratoga in 1777. After release from captivity at Cambridge, Massachusetts, he purchased a captain's commission in the 35th Foot in 1779 and transferred to the 4th Foot in 1784, becoming a major soon afterwards.

From 1788 to 1790, Napier was Grand Master of the Grand Lodge of Scotland and laid the foundation stone of the new buildings of the University of Edinburgh in 1789, for which he was awarded a LLD.

In 1796, 1802 and 1807, he was chosen as a Scottish representative peer and was Lord Lieutenant of Selkirkshire from 1797 until his death in 1823. From 1802 until his death, Napier was, with Henry Dundas, 1st Viscount Melville's help, annually nominated as Lord High Commissioner to the General Assembly of the Church of Scotland.

Napier died at his home, Dacre Lodge in Enfield, in 1823 and his title passed to his eldest son, William.

== Family ==
On 13 April 1784, Napier married Maria Margaret Clavering (c.1756–1821), the daughter of Lt.-Gen. Sir John Clavering, at St George's, Hanover Square. They had five daughters and four sons, including William John (1786–1834), later 9th Lord Napier.

Political offices
| Preceded by The Earl of Leven | Lord High Commissioner to the General Assembly of the Church of Scotland; 1802–1816 | Succeeded by The Earl of Erroll |
Honorary titles
| Preceded by Earl of Dalkeith | Lord Lieutenant of Selkirkshire; 1797–1823 | Succeeded by The Lord Montagu of Boughton |
Masonic offices
| Preceded by Lord Elcho | Grand Master of the Grand Lodge of Scotland; 1788–1790 | Succeeded by The Earl of Morton |
Peerage of Scotland
| Preceded by William Napier | Lord Napier; 1775–1823 | Succeeded by William Napier |
