= Lord Napier =

Title used by Sir Archibald Napier from 1627

Coat of arms of the Lord Napier of Merchistoun, Baron Ettrick of Ettrick, Baronet of Nova Scotia: Napier (arms of feudal Earls of Lennox, a title inherited by King James I & VI from his father Henry Stuart, Lord Darnley) quartering Scott

Lord Napier, of Merchistoun, is a title in the Peerage of Scotland. It was created in 1627 for Sir Archibald Napier, 1st Baronet. Earlier that year, he already held the Napier Baronetcy, of Merchistoun in the County of Midlothian, created in the Baronetage of Nova Scotia. The titles remained united until 1683, when the Baronetcy became dormant. It was revived in the early 19th century and is now held by another branch of the Napier family. Between 1683 and 1686, the Lords of Napier also held the Nicolson Baronetcy, of Carnock in the County of Stirling, and since 1725 the Scott Baronetcy, of Thirlestane in the County of Selkirk, both baronetcies created in the Baronetage of Nova Scotia. The latter is still held today. Additionally, the tenth Lord was created Baron Ettrick, of Ettrick in the County of Selkirk in the Peerage of the United Kingdom on 16 July 1872.

Lord Napier is the hereditary Clan Chief of Clan Napier.

== History ==
=== Napier ===
Arms of Napier (same arms as Earl of Lennox): Argent, a saltire engrailed between four roses gules

The earliest recorded mention of the name Napier in Scotland occurred in 1290, in a charter of Maol Choluim I, Earl of Lennox, granting lands at Kilmahew to the Napiers. They are said to have taken their name from a saying by King Alexander II of Scotland to one of the Earls of Lennox, after a battle, that Lennox had na peer (no equal).

Archibald Napier, son of John Napier, the inventor of logarithms, served as a Gentleman of the Bedchamber to King James VI of Scotland (I of England) and as a Lord of Session. On 2 March 1627 he was created a baronet, "of Merchistoun in the County of Midlothian", in the Baronetage of Nova Scotia. A few months later he was raised to the Peerage of Scotland as Lord Napier, of Merchistoun. His grandson, the third Lord, obtained an extension of the patent with limitation to (1) his heirs female and their heirs male and female, and (2) failing which to his sisters and their heirs whatsoever, the female heir being obliged to assume the name and arms of Napier. On his death in 1683 the baronetcy became dormant (it was later revived, see the Napier Baronetcy of Merchistoun) while he was succeeded in the Lordship (according to the new patent) by his nephew Sir Thomas Nicolson, 4th Baronet, of Carnock, who became the 4th Lord Napier. He was the son of Sir Thomas Nicolson, 3rd Baronet, of Carnock by his wife the Hon. Jean Napier, eldest daughter of the second Lord Napier. The 4th Lord Napier died unmarried at an early age and was succeeded in the Baronetcy by his cousin and heir male (see the Baron Carnock for later history of this title) and in the Lordship by his aunt, the fifth Lady Napier, the wife of John Brisbane.

=== Scott ===
Arms of Scott (of Buccleuch, Scotland): Or, on a bend Azure a mullet of six points between two crescents of the first

Lady Napier was succeeded by her grandson, the sixth Lord. He was the son of Sir William Scott, 2nd Baronet, of Thirlestane by his wife Elizabeth, Mistress of Napier. In 1725 he also succeeded his father as third Baronet of Thirlestane. (The Scott Baronetcy, of Thirlestane in the County of Selkirk, had been created in the Baronetage of Nova Scotia on 22 August 1666 for Francis Scott). The titles remain united. His grandson, the eighth Lord, sat in the House of Lords as a Scottish representative peer from 1796 to 1806 and from 1807 to 1823 and also served as Lord Lieutenant of Selkirkshire from 1819 to 1823. He was succeeded by his son, the ninth Lord. He was a Scottish Representative Peer from 1824 to 1832 and served as Ambassador to China in 1833. His son, the tenth Lord, was a prominent diplomat. In 1872 he was created Baron Ettrick, of Ettrick in the County of Selkirk, in the Peerage of the United Kingdom. This peerage gave him and his descendants an automatic seat in the House of Lords until the passing of the House of Lords Act 1999. As of 2017 the titles are held by his great-great-great-grandson, the fifteenth Lord, who succeeded his father in 2012. He is styled "Lord Napier and Ettrick".

== Lords Napier (1627); Barons Ettrick (1872) ==
=== Napier family ===
- Archibald Napier, 1st Lord Napier (c. 1575–1645) (already received the Napier Baronetcy in 1627)
- Archibald Napier, 2nd Lord Napier (c. 1625–1660)
- Archibald Napier, 3rd Lord Napier (d. 1683) (Napier Baronetcy became dormant upon his death)

=== Nicolson family ===
- Thomas Nicolson, 4th Lord Napier (1669–1688) (the only Lord Napier who held the Nicolson Baronetcy, from 1670 to 1688)
- Margaret Brisbane, 5th Lady Napier (d. 1706) (aunt, wife of John Brisbane)

=== Scott family (adopted surname Napier) ===
- Francis Napier, 6th Lord Napier (c. 1702–1773) (3rd Baronet, held the Scott Baronetcy from 1725 to 1773)
- William Napier, 7th Lord Napier (1730–1775)
- Francis Napier, 8th Lord Napier (1758–1823)
- William John Napier, 9th Lord Napier (1786–1834)
- Francis Napier, 10th Lord Napier, 1st Baron Ettrick (1819–1898)
- William John George Napier, 11th Lord Napier, 2nd Baron Ettrick (1846–1913)
- Francis Edward Basil Napier, 12th Lord Napier, 3rd Baron Ettrick (1876–1941)
- William Francis Cyril James Hamilton Napier, 13th Lord Napier, 4th Baron Ettrick (1900–1954)
- Francis Nigel Napier, 14th Lord Napier, 5th Baron Ettrick (1930–2012)
- Francis David Charles Napier, 15th Lord Napier, 6th Baron Ettrick (b. 1962)

The heir presumptive of the Lordship of Napier is the present holder's daughter, Hon. Sophie Eleanor Rose Napier, Mistress of Napier (b. 1999)
The heir presumptive of the Barony of Ettrick and the Scott baronetcy is the present holder's brother, Hon. Nicholas Alexander John Napier (b. 1971)
The heir presumptive's heir apparent is his son, Charles Ludovic Percy Napier (b. 2005)

== Scott baronets, of Thirlestane (1666) ==
- Sir Francis Scott, 1st Baronet (1645–1712)
- Sir William Scott, 2nd Baronet (c. 1680–1725)
- Sir Francis Scott, 3rd Baronet (c. 1702–1773) (had already succeeded as 6th Lord Napier in 1706)

== See also ==
- Baron Carnock
- Napier baronets of Merchistoun
