= Sir Joseph Napier, 1st Baronet =

Irish Member of Parliament, barrister and judge

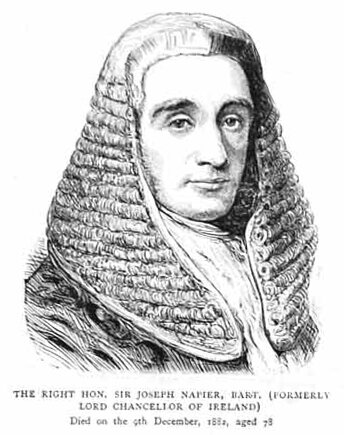
Sir Joseph Napier, The Graphic 1883

Sir Joseph Napier, 1st Baronet PC (26 December 1804 – 9 December 1882) was an Irish Conservative Party Member of Parliament (MP) in the United Kingdom Parliament. He was also a barrister and judge, who served briefly as Lord Chancellor of Ireland.

== Career ==
He was the son of William Napier and Rosetta MacNaghten of Ballyreagh House, County Antrim, and was born in Belfast, Ireland, where his father was a prosperous brewer. The family had emigrated to Ulster from Scotland: they were descended from John Napier, inventor of the logarithm. He attended the Belfast Academical Institution and Trinity College Dublin, before being called to the Irish Bar in 1831. He had contemplated remaining at Trinity and seeking a fellowship, but his marriage in 1831 disqualified him, as Trinity required its fellows to be celibate. He built up a very large practice, and acquired an impressive reputation for learning, especially in the area of pleading. He became a Queen's Counsel (QC) in 1844.

He was MP for Dublin University from 1848 to 1858, after failing to be elected in 1847. He became Attorney General for Ireland from March to December 1852. He was also made a member of the Privy Council of Ireland in 1852. He received a Doctorate in Civil Law in 1853.

In 1854, Napier was appointed to the Royal Commission for Consolidating the Statute Law, a royal commission to consolidate existing statutes and enactments of English law.

Napier was a staunch Tory in politics, and exceptionally diligent in attending to his political duties. He left the House of Commons when he was appointed Lord Chancellor of Ireland in 1858, an office he held until 1859. His appointment caused some surprise since he had made his reputation in the courts of common law, although he also did some chancery work. Some embarrassment was caused by the revelation that a previous holder of the office, Francis Blackburne, had been offered it a second time, and after an initial refusal had been willing to accept; Blackburne took his rejection very badly. Napier was created a Baronet in 1867 and appointed to the Privy Council of the United Kingdom in 1868, which entitled him to sit on the Judicial Committee of the Privy Council. Despite his obvious wish to return to office, he never became Chancellor again: even in the Tory party, his strong Evangelical views had made him enemies, while the Bar complained that his deafness made it impossible for him to conduct business efficiently. He accepted the position of Lord Justice of Appeal, but the reaction from the Bar was so unfavourable (his deafness rather than his religious beliefs seems to have been the issue here) that he withdrew his name. His publications include educational, mathematical and legal works.

In 1880, following the death of his eldest son William, a blow from which he never recovered, he retired to St Leonards-on-Sea in Sussex and died there on 9 December 1882. He was buried in Mount Jerome Cemetery, Dublin with a tablet to his memory placed in St Patrick's Cathedral, Dublin.

== Reputation ==
He was remembered as a learned jurist and a diligent Parliamentarian, but above all as a devout Protestant with a deep devotion to the Church of Ireland, whose disestablishment he fiercely opposed. When young he was an extreme Evangelical, and strongly opposed to Catholic Emancipation, but it is said that his views mellowed as he grew older. His earlier religious views led to a clash with Daniel O'Connell, who nicknamed him "Holy Joe". He was sometimes accused of hypocrisy, and certainly knew how to dissemble: candidates for office who were assured of his support sometimes found to their outrage that he had been blocking them all along.

== Family ==
He married Charity (Cherry) Grace, daughter of John Grace of Dublin (from an old Kilkenny family), on 20 August 1831. Described as "an impulsive love match", the marriage was a very happy one. They had 2 sons: William John Napier, who predeceased his parents, to their intense grief, and Sir Joseph Napier, 2nd Baronet, and 3 daughters: Grace, Rosetta and Cherry. Lady Napier died on 4 March 1901.

One of his sisters, Rosetta Napier, married James Whiteside, Attorney General for Ireland and later Lord Chief Justice of Ireland. The warm friendship between the two men ended in a bitter quarrel which was never made up. Another sister, Mary Napier, married Echlin Molyneux who later became a Professor of English Law at Queen's University Belfast; she died young in 1831, leaving a son, James Henry.

John Robinson, founder and proprietor of the Dublin Daily Express, was a cousin: this assured Napier of favourable press coverage in a wide-circulation Unionist newspaper.

== Bibliography ==
- Who's Who of British Members of Parliament: Vol. I 1832-1885, edited by Michael Stenton (The Harvester Press 1976)
- Andrew Shields, The Irish Conservative Party, 1852-1868: Land, Politics and Religion (Dublin, 2007)
- Authorized Report of the Proceedings of the Church Congress held at York, 1866. with speech from Napier
- Charles Mosley, Burke's Peerage and Baronetage, 107th edition, Wilmington, Delaware, U.S.A. 2003
- Copy of confirmation of arms to the descendants of Joseph Napier of St. Andrews, Co. Down and to his grandson, the Rt. Hon. Joseph Napier, M.P., Lord Chancellor of Ireland, son of William Napier of St. Andrews, 16 March 1867. Dublin: National Library of Ireland, Genealogical Office: Ms. 109, pp. 143–4
- Our portrait gallery - No. LXIX: The Rt. Hon. Joseph Napier, M. P. (With etching). The Dublin University magazine: a literary and political journal, Vol. XLI, pp. 300–314, March, 1853. National Library of Ireland.
- Lee, Sidney, ed. (1894). "Napier, Joseph" . Dictionary of National Biography. Vol. 40. London: Smith, Elder & Co. pp. 65–68.
- Ewald, Alexander Charles. The Life of Sir Joseph Napier, Bart., ex Lord Chancellor of Ireland: from his private correspondence. Longmans, Green. London, 492pp. 1887

Parliament of the United Kingdom
Preceded by Sir Frederick Shaw, Bt; George Alexander Hamilton	Member of Parliament for Dublin University; 1848–1858; With: George Alexander Hamilton	Succeeded by Anthony Lefroy; George Alexander Hamilton
Legal offices
Preceded by John Hatchell	Attorney-General for Ireland; 1852–1853	Succeeded by Abraham Brewster
Political offices
Preceded by Maziere Brady	Lord Chancellor of Ireland; 1858–1859	Succeeded by Maziere Brady
Baronetage of the United Kingdom
New creation	Baronet (of Merrion Square); 1867–1882	Succeeded by Joseph Napier
