= Archibald Napier, 1st Lord Napier =

Scottish politician and judge

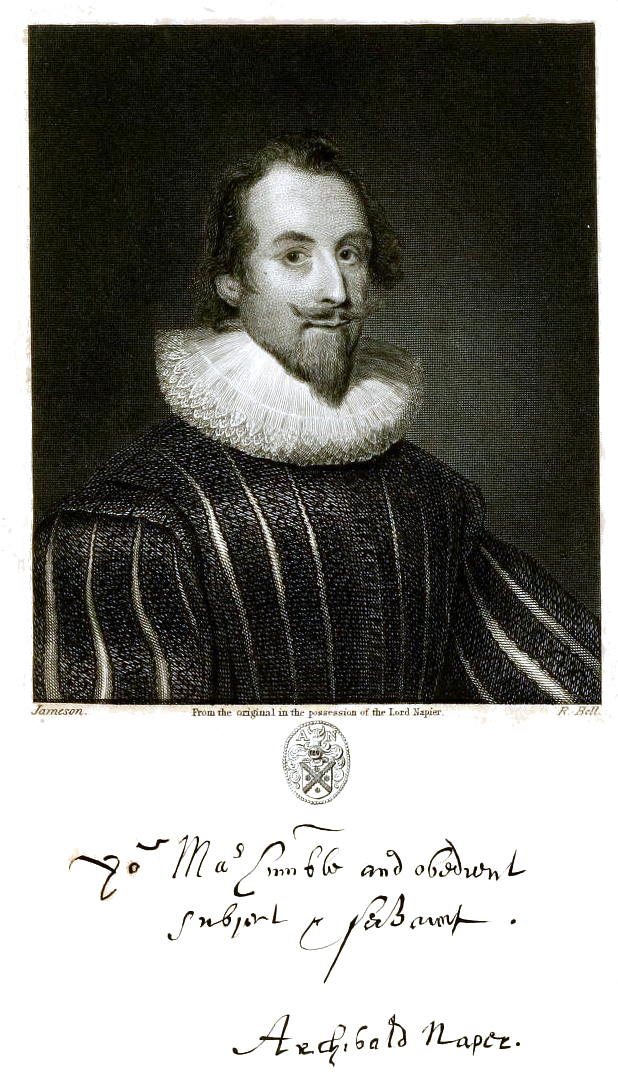
- Sir Archibald Napier (1576–1645)

Treasurer-depute of Scotland
- In office 1622-1631

Lord of Session
- In office 1623

Personal details
- Born: c. 1576
- Died: November 1645 (aged 68–69)
- Spouse: Margaret Graham (m. 1619)
- Children: 4, including Archibald
- Parent: John Napier (father)
- Relatives: Archibald Napier (grandfather); Francis Bothwell (grandfather); Alexander Napier (uncle)

Archibald Napier, 1st Lord Napier, the 9th Laird Napier of Merchiston (c. 1576 – November 1645), was a Scottish politician and judge. In 1627 he was created Lord Napier of Merchiston and Baronet of Nova Scotia.

== Biography ==
Archibald Napier was the son of mathematician John Napier (the 8th Laird of Merchiston) and Elizabeth Stirling. He was also the grandson of Sir Archibald Napier.

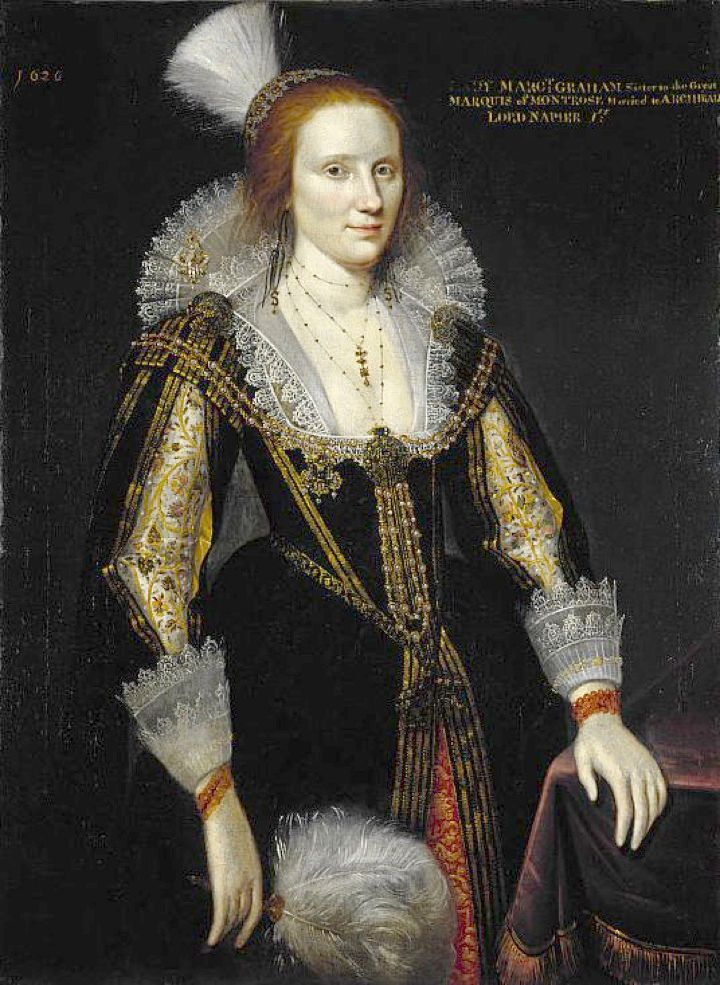
Margaret Graham

In 1619, he married Margaret Graham, who was a daughter of John Graham, 4th Earl of Montrose and Lady Margaret Ruthven, and sister of James Graham, 1st Marquess of Montrose. They had four children:

- John Napier, who died young.
- Archibald Napier, who succeeded his father as Lord Napier.
- Margaret Napier, who married Sir George Stirling of Keir.
- Lilias Napier, who died unmarried.

== Offices and honors ==
Throughout his political career, he held many offices. Among these were:

- Gentleman of the Privy Chamber to King James VI. Napier accompanied him to London in 1603 to be crowned at Westminster Abbey.
- Treasurer-depute of Scotland from 1622 to 1631.
- Lord of Session in 1623.

In addition, he was one of the Bearers of the Canopy in the State Procession of 1633. He was raised to Baronet of Nova Scotia on 2 May 1627. He was knighted by King Charles I of England with the title Lord Napier of Merchiston on 5 May 1627.

== Royalist ==
In 1640 he supported King Charles I against the Covenanters with his son, Archibald, the Master of Napier. Napier's son escaped, but Lord Napier and the rest of his family were imprisoned in Edinburgh Castle and fined £10,000. They were transferred to Linlithgow but Lord Napier's son Archibald managed to organise their escape. Both Lord Napier and his son joined the Marquess of Montrose (Lord Napier's brother-in-law) and fought with him at the Battle of Philiphaugh, though Lord Napier was over 70 years of age. Montrose and his followers lost at Philiphaugh and Montrose escaped to the Highlands with Lord Napier and his son. Lord Napier died at Fincastle, in Perthshire, in November 1645.

He wrote Memoirs of Archibald, First Lord Napier: Written by Himself. This was a defence against accusations of financial impropriety which were later judged to be false. The memoirs were later published in Edinburgh in 1793 by Francis, the 8th Lord Napier.

Baronetage of Nova Scotia
New creation	Baronet (of Merchistoun); 1627–1645	Succeeded by Archibald Napier
Peerage of Scotland
New creation	Lord Napier; 1627–1645	Succeeded by Archibald Napier
