= Francis Napier, 10th Lord Napier =

Scottish polyglot, diplomat and colonial administrator

The Right Honourable The Lord Napier KT PC
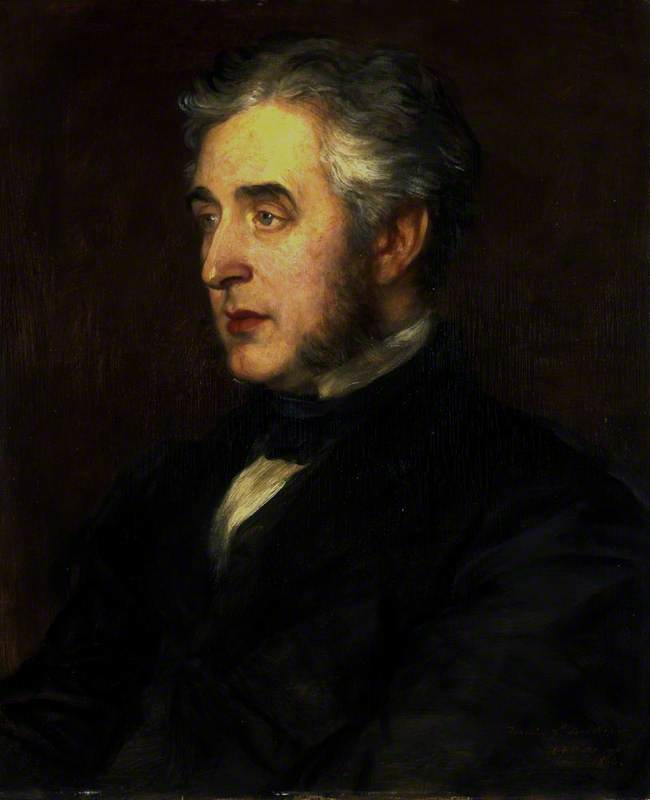
- Portrait by George Frederic Watts, 1866

Governor of Madras Presidency
- In office 27 March 1866 – 19 February 1872
- Preceded by: Sir William Thomas Denison
- Succeeded by: Alexander John Arbuthnot; As Acting Governor

Ambassador of the United Kingdom to Russia
- In office 1861–1864
- Preceded by: John Crampton
- Succeeded by: Andrew Buchanan

Personal details
- Born: 15 September 1819 Thirlestane Castle, Selkirkshire, Scotland
- Died: 19 December 1898 (aged 79) Florence, Tuscany, Kingdom of Italy
- Spouse: Anne Jane Charlotte Lockwood
- Parent: William Napier, 9th Lord Napier (father)
- Education: Trinity College, Cambridge

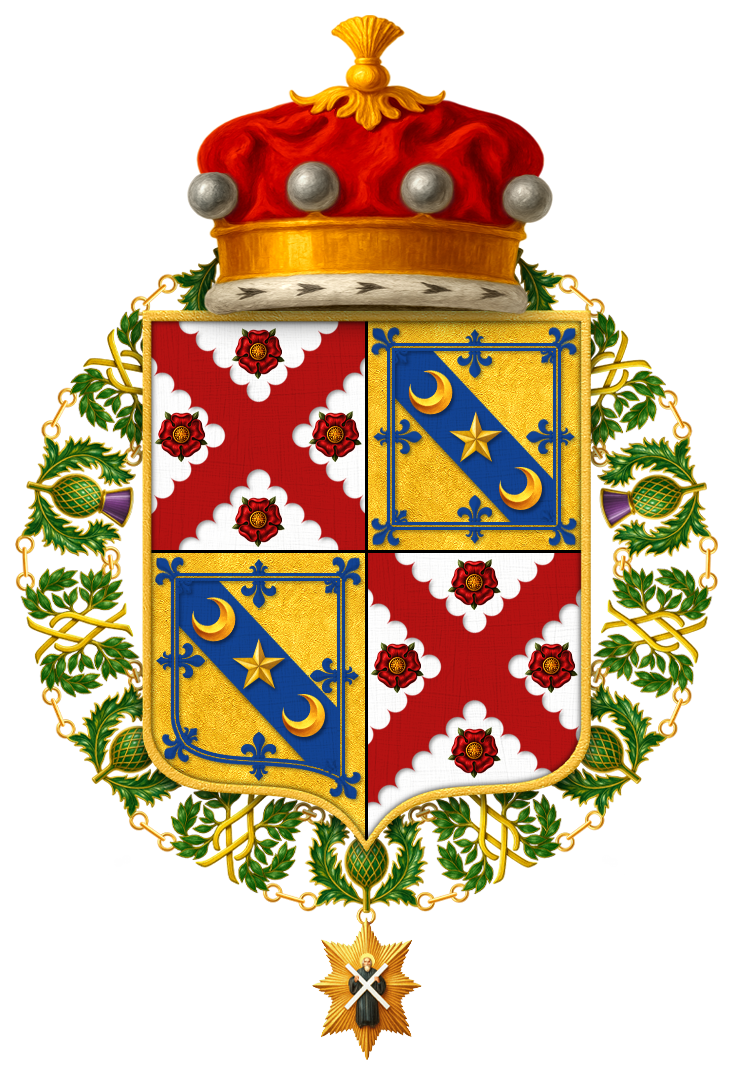
Shield of Arms of Francis Napier, 10th Lord Napier and 1st Baron Ettrick, KT, PC

Francis Napier, 10th Lord Napier and 1st Baron Ettrick, KT, PC (15 September 1819 – 19 December 1898) was a British polyglot, diplomat and colonial administrator. He served as the British Minister to the United States from 1857 to 1859, Netherlands from 1859 to 1860, Russia from 1861 to 1864, Prussia from 1864 to 1866 and as the Governor of Madras from 1866 to 1872. He also acted as the Governor-General of India from February to May 1872.

Francis Napier was born on 15 September 1819 to William Napier, 9th Lord Napier and had his early education through private tutors. He joined the Trinity College, Cambridge in 1835 but did not complete his graduation. Instead, he mastered foreign languages and served as a diplomat in foreign missions. In 1866, he was appointed Governor of Madras and served from 1866 to 1872. On the assassination of the Earl of Mayo, the then Viceroy of India in February 1872, Napier was appointed to act temporarily as the Viceroy of India and served from February to May 1872. Napier returned to the United Kingdom in July 1872 and in his later life, chaired the Napier Commission. Napier died at Florence, Italy on 18 December 1898 at the age of 79.

Napier was made a Knight of the Thistle in 1864. In 1872, he was created Baron Ettrick in the Peerage of the United Kingdom in recognition of his services in India.

== Early life and education ==
Francis Napier was born on 15 September 1819 to William John Napier, the 9th Lord Napier of Merchistoun and his wife, Elizabeth Cochrane-Johnstone at Thirlestane Castle in Selkirkshire. He was the eldest son of the couple.

Napier had his early education in private and was schooled at Saxe-Meiningen. He joined Trinity College, Cambridge in 1835 but did not complete his graduation. However, he acquired a knowledge of a few foreign languages under the tutorship of Rev. Walter Patterson in Geneva. Napier became the 10th Lord Merchistoun on the death of his father William John Napier on 11 October 1834.

== Diplomatic career ==
Due to his fluency in multiple languages, Napier's lack of educational qualifications was overlooked and he entered the diplomatic service in 1840. He was appointed to the British embassy at Vienna and later, Constantinople, where he served as an attaché. In 1848, Napier was appointed Secretary of the British delegation at Naples. He served as the Acting Ambassador for a period of eighteen months in Naples, when Italy was embroiled in the Sicilian insurrection.

After his experience in Naples, he found time to publish a book assessing contemporary painters in Naples. An aristocratic haughtiness regarding the local populace infuses his writing, dismissing the skills of more than one artist, and in reactionary fashion, the revolutionary instincts of the masses. In the preface, he writes:

It was the fortune of the author to hold a diplomatic employment at the Court of Naples, during a period in which the appropriate pastimes of that pleasant city were discarded for the illusions and regrets of political change. These transactions, of which the melancholy issue is notorious, were of a nature to engross and often to darken the thoughts of one, who had an intimate knowledge and a foreboding view of the revolutionary drama; the resources of society were limited by the suspicions and passions which altered and envenomed the conversation even of cultivated men; and the author was induced, alike by necessity and taste, to expend his relaxation and recover his serenity in the study of the local Arts.

— Notes on Modern Painting at Naples, 1850

Napier's handling of affairs as acting ambassador in Naples impressed the then Secretary of State for Foreign Affairs, Lord Palmerston. He was posted to the British embassy at St Petersburg, where he became a close confidante of Tsar Alexander II. After serving short, satisfactory terms at the British embassies at St Petersburg and Constantinople, Napier was appointed envoy extraordinaire and minister plenipotentiary to the United States and served from 1857 to 1859. Napier's tenure in Washington was soon mired in controversy. The abolitionist Charles Sumner and elements of the Northern press accused the British minister of being a pro-slavery partisan. More damaging still in the eyes of the British government was the claim that he had taken upon himself to declare in conversations that Britain recognized the Monroe Doctrine, when all the British governments till then had repudiated it. Critics at the Foreign Office accused him of "giving up everything the United States can wish for, even before they ask it", which for them explained Napier's immense popularity with Washington's influential residents. He was recalled and given the less sensitive post of minister to the Netherlands. Napier served there from 1859 to 1861 and in Prussia from 1864 to 1866. He was then appointed Governor of Madras in 1866 and served from 27 March 1866 to 19 February 1872.

== Governor of Madras ==
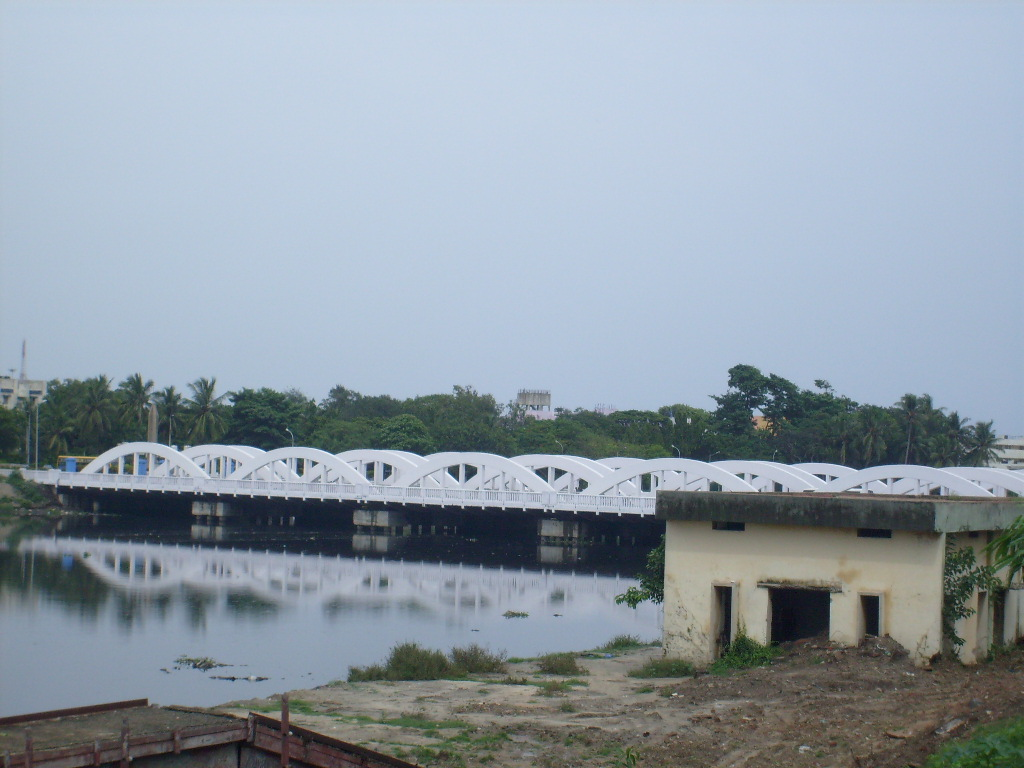
Napier Bridge in Chennai

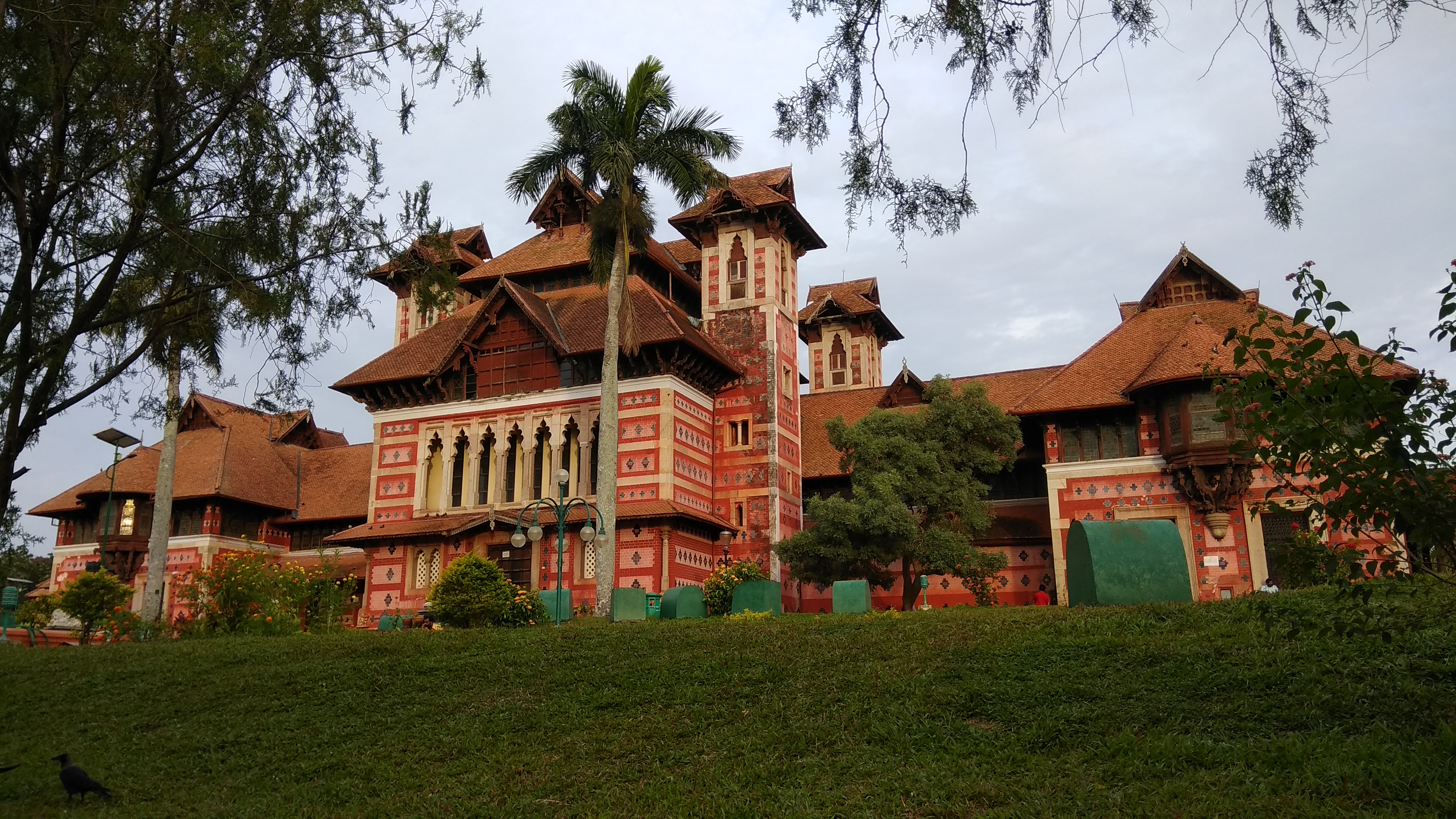
Napier Museum in Tiruvananthapuram

As soon as Napier took office as the Governor of Madras, he was faced with a severe famine in Ganjam District. He took the services of Florence Nightingale whom he had known in Constantinople. Napier undertook many major irrigation schemes during his tenure. The Pennar Dam was completed during his tenure and two other irrigation works, the Rushikulya Dam in Ganjam and the Mullaperiyar Dam were conceived during his tenure.

Despite being at odds with different viceroys over financial issues throughout his tenure, Napier was able to resolve disputes in an amicable manner due to the friendly relations he had with Sir John Lawrence and well as his successor, Richard Bourke, 6th Earl of Mayo. When the Earl of Mayo was assassinated in the Andamans on 8 February 1872, Napier was designated to act as the Viceroy of India and he served for a short time before being relieved by Lord Northbrook. For his creditable performance as Governor of Madras, Napier was created Baron Ettrick of Ettrick in the peerage of the United Kingdom.

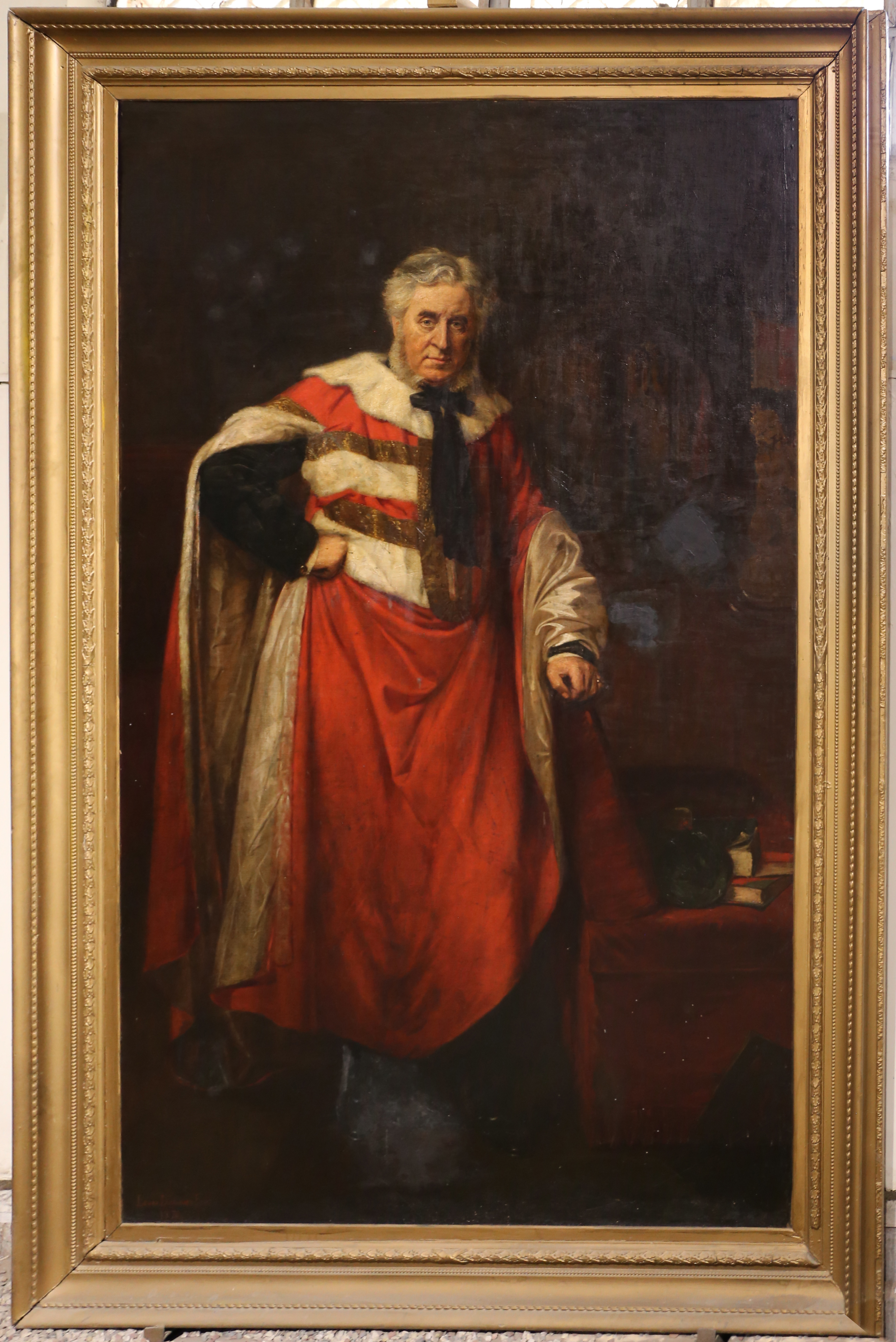
Lord Napier by Lowes Dickinson

In 1869, Napier constructed the Napier Bridge across the Coovum River in Chennai. The Napier Park in Chennai and the Napier Museum in Trivandrum, Travancore were set up in his memory. Between 1866 and 1872, he had partially restored the Thirumalai Nayakkar Mahal as well, which was earlier demolished considerably by Grandson of King Thirumalai Nayak.

In addition there is a surgical ward in Stanley Medical College Hospital in Chennai, named in his honor. The ward was originally built with the help of donations by the Governor Napier.

== Later life and death ==
At the end of his term as acting Viceroy of India, Napier returned to the United Kingdom and acted as the President of the Social Science Association during its meetings at Plymouth and Glasgow in October 1874. During this time, Napier also served in the London School Board.

Lord Napier continued, both in England and in Scotland, to take great interest in social questions. He was the chairman of the Napier Commission(the Royal Commission of Inquiry into the Condition of Crofters and Cottars in the Highlands and Islands) which was appointed in 1883 and reported in 1884.

Napier died in Florence, Italy on 19 December 1898 at the age of 79.

== Honours ==
Napier was appointed to Privy Council in 1861 and made a Knight of the Thistle in 1864.

== Family ==
Napier married Anne Jane Charlotte Lockwood (1824–1911) on 2 September 1845. The couple had four sons.

- William Napier, 11th Lord Napier (1846–1913)
- John Scott (1848–1928)
- R. N. Basil (1850–1874)
- Mark Francis (1852–1919)

== Portrait ==
The New York Times gives a short physical description of Napier on his appointment as Viceroy of India.

Lord Napier is sixty-two years old, considerably above middle size, strong, healthy, with calm, handsome face, gray hair and whiskers, an early riser, very often a late goer to bed, gifted with inexhaustible energy, tact common sense and acuteness of judgement.

Diplomatic posts
Preceded by Sir John Crampton	British Minister to the United States; 1857–1859	Succeeded by The Lord Lyons
Preceded by Sir Ralph Abercromby	British Minister to the Netherlands; 1859–1860	Succeeded by Sir Andrew Buchanan
Preceded by Sir John Crampton	British Ambassador to Russia; 1861–1864	Succeeded by Sir Andrew Buchanan
Preceded by Andrew Buchanan (as Minister)	British Ambassador to Prussia; 1864–1866	Succeeded by Lord Augustus Loftus
Government offices
Preceded by Sir William Denison	Governor of Madras; 1866–1872	Succeeded by Alexander John Arbuthnot
Preceded by Sir John Strachey, acting	Viceroy of India, acting 1872	Succeeded by The Lord Northbrook
Peerage of Scotland
Preceded by William Napier	Lord Napier; 1834–1898	Succeeded by William Napier
Peerage of the United Kingdom
New creation	Baron Ettrick; 1872–1898	Succeeded by William Napier
