= William Napier, 9th Lord Napier =

British Royal Navy officer and trade envoy in China (1786-1834)

The Lord Napier
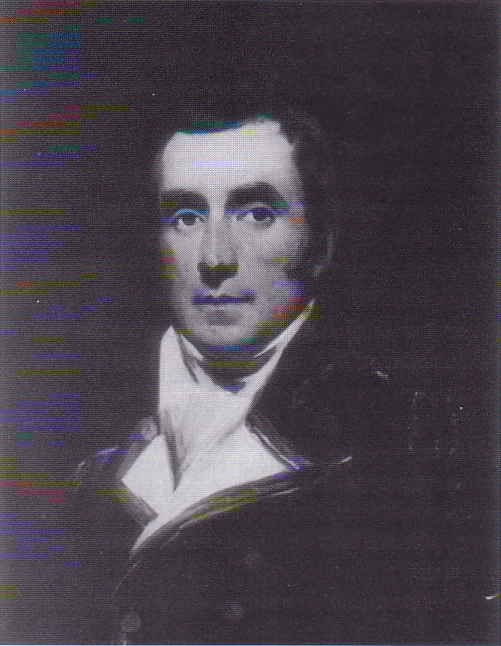

Chief Superintendent of British Trade in China
- In office 31 December 1833 – 11 October 1834
- Preceded by: Position created
- Succeeded by: John Francis Davis

Personal details
- Born: 13 October 1786 Kinsale, Ireland
- Died: 11 October 1834 (aged 47) Macau
- Spouse: Elizabeth Cochrane-Johnstone (m. 1816)
- Parent: Francis Napier, 8th Lord Napier (father)
- Relatives: Francis Napier, 10th Lord Napier (son)
- Profession: Naval officer, trade envoy

William John Napier, 9th Lord Napier, Baron Napier (Chinese: 律勞卑) FRSE (13 October 1786 – 11 October 1834) was a British Royal Navy officer and trade envoy in China.

== Early life ==
Napier was born in Kinsale, Ireland, on 13 October 1786. He was the son of Francis Napier, 8th Lord Napier (1758–1823) and the father of Francis Napier, 10th Lord Napier and 1st Baron Ettrick (1819–1898).

He enlisted in the Royal Navy in 1803 and served - with distinction - as a midshipman on HMS Defiance at the Battle of Trafalgar (1805). He later served as lieutenant under Thomas Cochrane, 10th Earl of Dundonald.

== Career ==
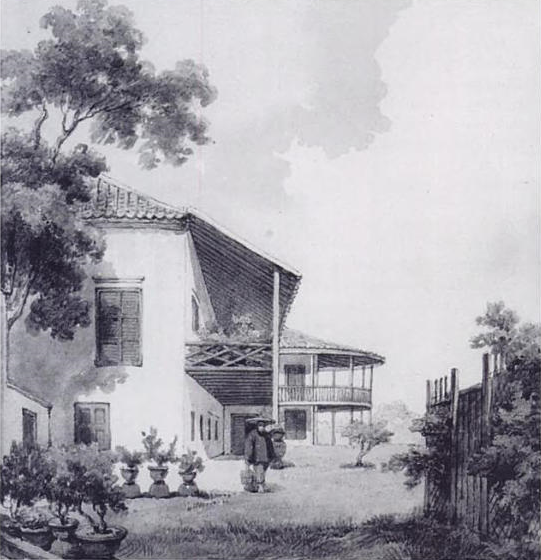
Lord Napier's house in Macau

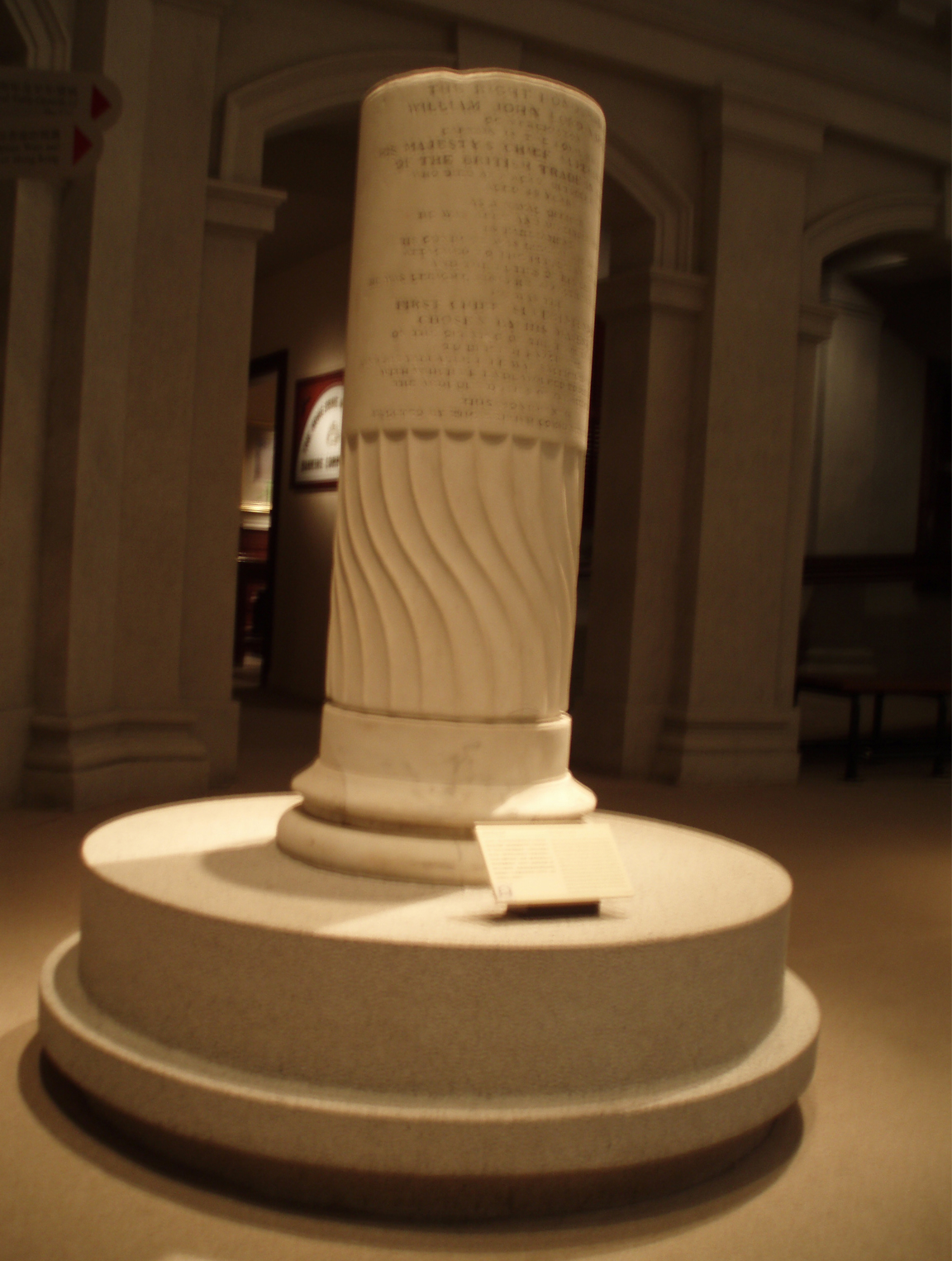
Lord Napier Memorial

In 1818 he was elected a Fellow of the Royal Society of Edinburgh. His proposers were Sir David Brewster, Sir George Steuart Mackenzie, and John Playfair.

A peer of Scotland, Lord Napier was an elected Scottish representative in the House of Lords from 1824 to 1832. In December 1833, upon the ending of British East India Company's monopoly on trade in the Far East, he was appointed by Foreign Secretary Lord Palmerston, a family friend of Napier, as the first Chief Superintendent of Trade at Canton (now Guangzhou), in China. The Second and Third Superintendents were John Francis Davis and Sir George Best Robinson, respectively. He arrived at Macau on 15 July 1834 on board the East India Company frigate Andromache, and reached Canton ten days later, with the mission of preventing conflict between the now free British merchants and the Chinese. Lacking the necessary diplomatic, cultural, and commercial experience, he was not successful in achieving the objective.

Napier arrived in Canton without first waiting in Macao for permission to sail to Canton and demanded to speak directly with Lu Kun, the Governor-general of the Liangguang. Both arriving without approval and expecting to personally meet with Lu Kun were violations of longstanding protocols, and as such Napier was refused a meeting and told to leave Canton.

Napier's refusal to leave Canton or to speak through an intermediary led Lu Kun to order Chinese soldiers to surround the British factory at Canton and order all Chinese workers and guards to leave the factory. In response, Napier sent the frigates Andromache and Imogene to Whampoa on 11 September, defying an edict issued by Lu Kun, in an exchange of cannon fire as the British warships breached defences at the Bocca Tigris, in which two British sailors were killed and several more were wounded. After a prolonged stalemate, Lord Napier, sapped by typhus and without the support of the British merchants at Canton, was forced to retire to Macau in September 1834, where he died of the fever on 11 October. Originally buried in Macau, he was later exhumed for reburial at Ettrick in Scotland.

Napier was the first British representative to suggest seizing Hong Kong. In a dispatch to Lord Palmerston on 14 August 1834, he suggested a commercial treaty, backed by an armed force, be done to secure the rights and interests of European merchants in China. He recommended that a small British force "should take possession of the Island of Hongkong, in the eastern entrance of the Canton River, which is admirably adapted for every purpose".

== Family ==
Lord Napier married Elizabeth Cochrane-Johnstone (c. 1795–1883), daughter of Scottish adventurer Andrew Cochrane-Johnstone, in 1816; they had two sons and six daughters. His eldest son, Francis Napier, also entered diplomatic service and was promoted by Palmerston for the rest of his life.

== Honours ==
Following his death, 120 years later, the British Government placed a memorial to him before the Macao Customs Office. After being lost for a short time, it was moved to the Hong Kong Cemetery, and then to the Hong Kong Museum of History, where it now rests.

== Notes ==
Peerage of Scotland
Preceded by Francis Napier	Lord Napier; 1823-1834	Succeeded by Francis Napier
