= Francis Napier, 6th Lord Napier =

Scottish peer

Francis Napier, 6th Lord Napier (né Scott) (c. 1702 – 1773) was a Scottish peer.

== Early life ==
Born Francis Scott c. 1702, he was the son of Sir William Scott, 2nd Baronet of Thirlestane, and Elizabeth Napier, Mistress of Napier.

== Career ==
Upon the death of his maternal grandmother Margaret Brisbane, 5th Lady Napier in 1706, he succeeded to the title, Lord Napier, and legally changed his surname to Napier; upon the death of his father in 1725, he succeeded to the baronetcy of Scott, of Thirlestane in the County of Selkirk. The titles have been united ever since.

Lord Napier served as Commissioner of Police for Scotland between 1761 and 1773.

== Personal life ==
Lord Napier married twice, firstly in 1729 to Lady Henrietta Hope, the daughter of Charles Hope, 1st Earl of Hopetoun and Henrietta Hope, Countess of Hopetoun. They had five sons:

- William Napier (d. 1775), who became the 7th Lord Napier in 1773.
- Capt. Charles Napier of Merchiston Hall (1731–1807), who married twice: first to Grizel Warrender, daughter of Sir John Warrender, 2nd Baronet, in 1763; second to Christian Hamilton, daughter of Gabriel Hamilton and Agnes Dundas, a maternal great-granddaughter of the 17th Earl of Crawford, in 1777. With his second wife, he had two sons (Sir Charles and Sir Thomas Erskine), and a daughter, Henrietta Hope.
- Lt. Col. Francis Napier (d. 1779), an officer in the Royal Marines who married Elizabeth Greenway, daughter of John Greenway.
- John Napier (d. 1759), who died unmarried.
- Major General Mark Napier (1738–1809), who married twice: firstly to Anne Neilson, daughter of John Neilson, in 1761. He later married Margaret Simpson, daughter of Alexander Simpson of Concraig.

In 1750, he married Henrietta Maria Johnston, the daughter of George Johnston of Dublin, and had:

- George Napier (1751–1804), who married Lady Sarah Lennox, a daughter of Charles Lennox, 2nd Duke of Richmond, and whose sons were notable in their military service.
- Hester Napier (d. 1819), who married Alexander Johnston.
- James Napier (d. 1760), who died young.
- Capt. Patrick Napier (d. 1801), a captain in the Royal Navy.
- Lt. James John Napier (d. 1776) killed aboard the frigate HMS Fox.
- Lt. Stewart Napier (d. 1778)
- Mary Napier (d. 1765)

Upon his death in 1773, his titles passed to his eldest son William.

Peerage of Scotland
Preceded by Margaret Brisbane	Lord Napier; 1706–1773	Succeeded by William Napier
Baronetage of Nova Scotia
Preceded by William Scott	Baronet (of Thirlestane); 1725–1773	Succeeded by William Napier
