= Napier baronets =

Set index for Shelley baronets

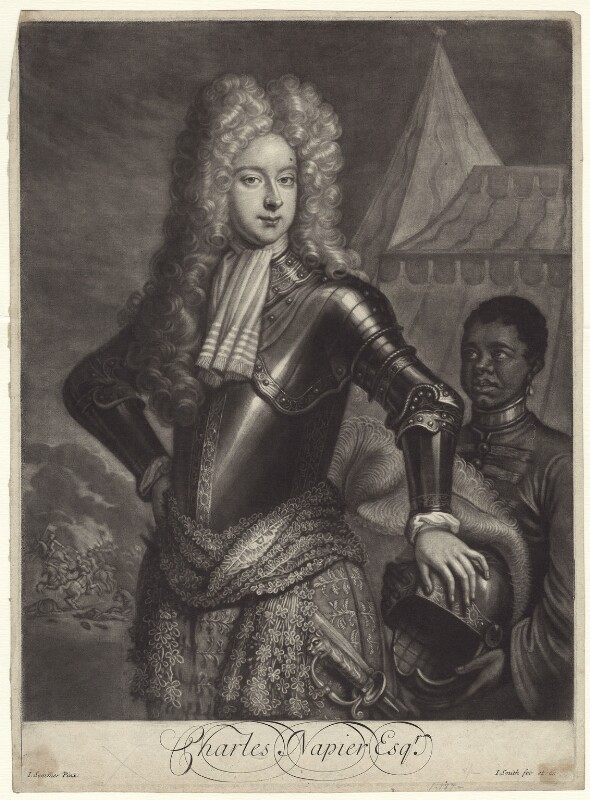
Sir Charles Napier, 2nd Baronet

There have been five baronetcies created for people with the surname Napier, three in the Baronetage of England, one in the Baronetage of Nova Scotia and one in the Baronetage of the United Kingdom. As of 2026 two of the creations are extant.

- Napier baronets of Luton Hoo (1611)
- Napier baronets of Merchistoun (1627)
- Napier baronets of Middle Marsh (1641)
- Napier baronets of Punknoll (1682)
- Napier baronets of Merrion Square (1867)
