= Sir Robert Milliken-Napier, 9th Baronet =

Scottish baronet

Sir Robert John Milliken-Napier, 9th Baronet of Merchiston (7 November 1818 – 4 December 1884) was a Scottish baronet and Army officer.

== Early life ==
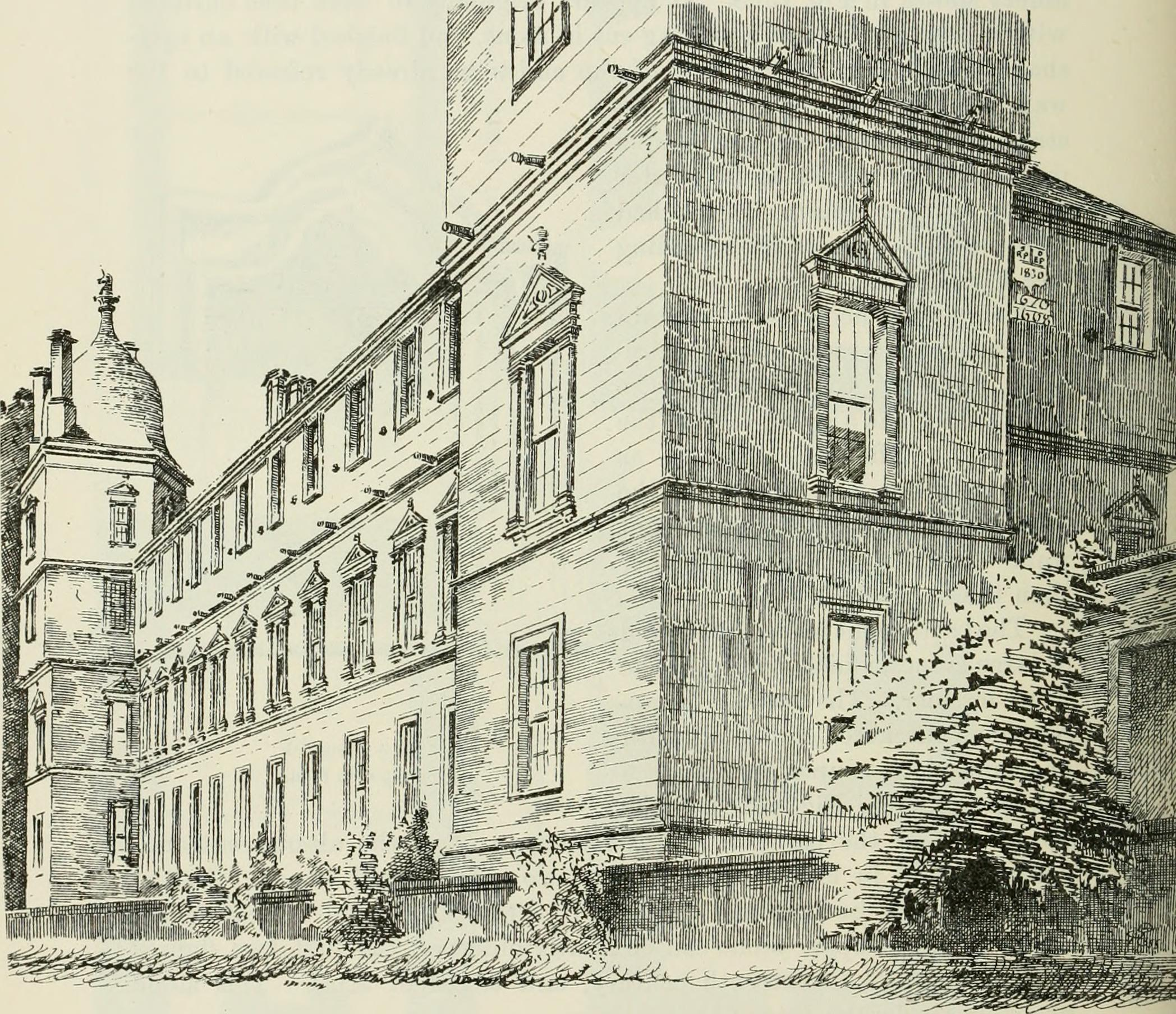
Culcreuch Castle, 1887

Milliken-Napier was born on 7 November 1818 into the Napier family of Merchiston, Scotland. He was the eldest son three children born to Eliza Christian Stirling and Sir William John Milliken-Napier, 8th Baronet. His elder sister was Mary Napier (wife of Robert Speir, of Burnbrae, Renfrewshire and Culdees, Perthshire) and his younger brother was John Stirling Milliken-Napier.

His maternal grandfather was John Stirling of Kippendavie. His maternal grandparents were Col. Robert John Milliken-Napier of Culcreuch, Stirling and Anne Campbell. Through his father, he was a descendant of John Napier, the inventor of logarithms.

== Career ==
Upon the death of his father on 4 February 1852, he succeeded to the baronetcy of Merchiston, and became the 9th Baronet.

He was an Honorary Colonel in the 4th Battalion, Princess Louise's Argyll and Sutherland Highlanders.

== Personal life ==
On 4 April 1850, Milliken-Napier was married to Anne Salisbury Meliora Ladaveze Adlercron, daughter of John Ladaveze Adlercron (a grandson of Lt.-Gen. John Adlercron, Commander-in-Chief, India) and Dorothea Catherine Routh. Anne's nephew was Brigadier Rodolph Ladeveze Adlercron. Together, they were the parents of three sons and three daughters, including:

- Sir Archibald Lennox Milliken Napier, 10th Baronet (1855–1907), who married Mary Allison Dorothy Fairbairn, daughter of Sir Thomas Fairbairn, 2nd Baronet, in 1880. They divorced in 1903 and he married Charlotte Louise Austin, daughter of Henry William Austin (Chief Justice of the Bahamas), in 1904.
- Robert Francis Ladeveze Milliken-Napier (1856–1898), a Major with the Queen's Own Cameron Highlanders who married Emily Norrie Moke, daughter of George Louis Augustus Moke, in 1887.
- William Edward Stirling Milliken-Napier (1858–1900), who married Janet Catherine Reid, daughter of W. M. Reid, in 1884.
- Aymée Elizabeth Georgiana Millikin-Napier (d. 1947), who married Lt.-Col. Sir George Clerk, 8th Baronet, son of Sir James Clerk, 7th Baronet of Penicuik, in 1876.
- Anne Salisbury Mary Meliora Milliken-Napier (d. 1941), who married Sir John Hay, 9th Baronet, son of Sir Robert Hay, 8th Baronet, in 1881.
- Theodora Evelyn Milliken-Napier, who died unmarried.

Sir Robert died on 4 December 1884 and was succeeded by his son Archibald.

Baronetage of Nova Scotia
| Preceded by William John Milliken-Napier | Baronet (of Merchistoun); 1852–1884 | Succeeded by Archibald Lennox Milliken Napier |
