= Sir Robert Hay, 8th Baronet =

Scottish baronet

Sir Robert Hay, 8th Baronet of Smithfield and Haystoun DL JP (8 May 1825 – 30 May 1885) was a Scottish baronet.

== Early life ==
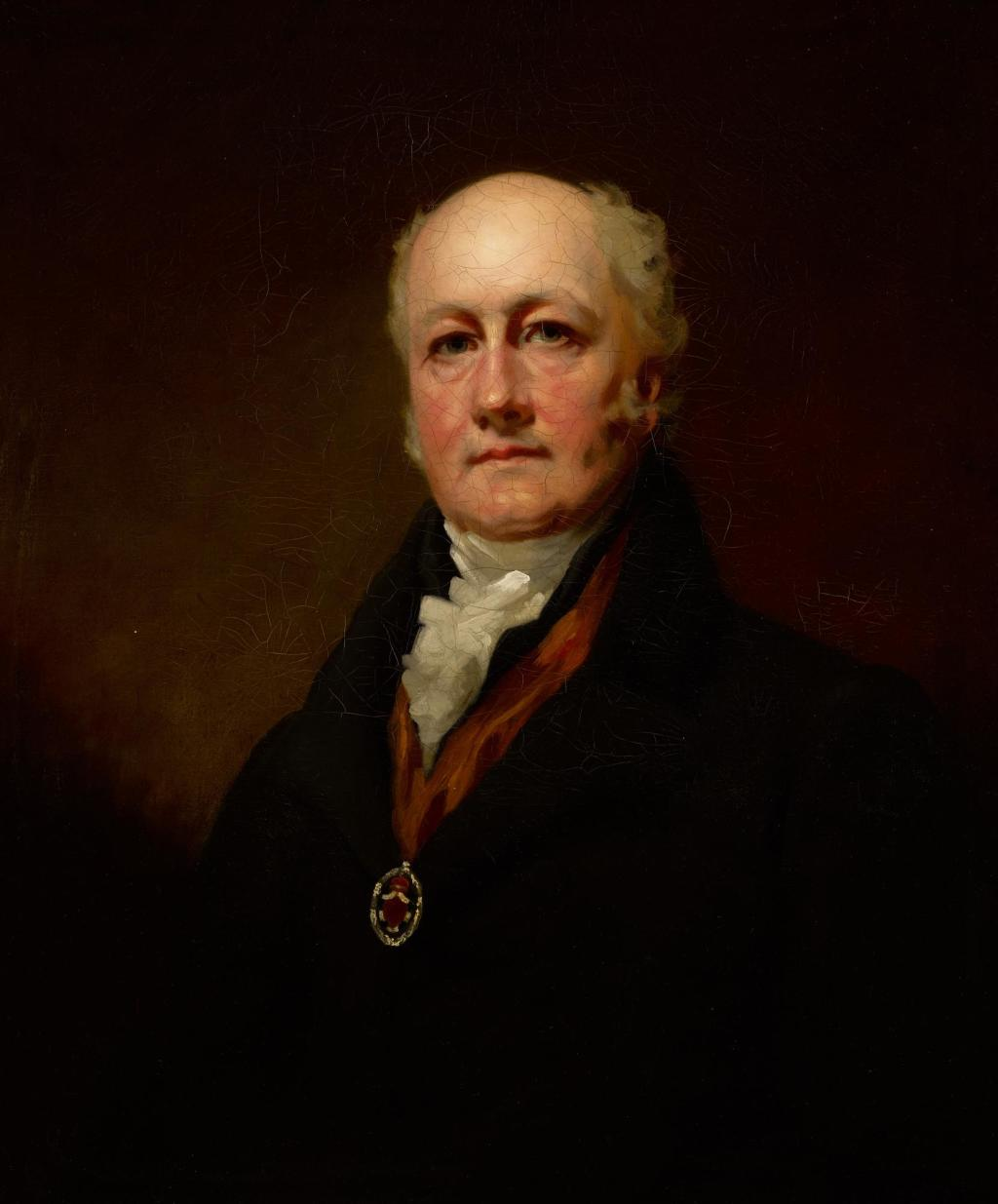
Portrait of his grandfather, Sir John Hay, 5th Baronet, studio of Sir Henry Raeburn

Hay was born on 8 May 1825. He was the son of Sir Adam Hay, 7th Baronet and Henrietta Callender Grant. His father served as MP for Lanark Burghs from 1826 to 1830. Among his surviving siblings were Dorothea Hay (wife of Henry Scudamore-Stanhope, 9th Earl of Chesterfield) and Louisa Grace Hay (second wife of Brig.-Gen. James Wolfe Murray, son of James Wolfe Murray, Lord Cringletie).

His father, the second surviving son of Sir John Hay, 5th Baronet and Hon. Mary Elizabeth Forbes (a daughter of James Forbes, 16th Lord Forbes), succeeded to the baronetcy after the death of his brother, Sir John Hay, 6th Baronet, MP for Peeblesshire. His maternal grandparents were William Grant and Dorothea Dalrymple. His aunt, Louisa Grant, was the wife of the Hon. William Keith-Falconer (younger son of the 6th Earl of Kintore).

== Career ==
Upon the death of his father on 18 January 1867, he succeeded as the 8th Baronet Hay, of Smithfield and Haystoun. His seat was Kings Meadow, Haystown, Peebles (and he entailed the estates), and he was a member of the Carlton and Marlborough Clubs.

Sir Robert served as a Deputy Lieutenant and Magistrate for Peeblesshire, and a Major in the Midlothian Rifle Volunteers.

== Personal life ==
In August 1853 married Sarah "Sally" Duncan (1833–1910), a daughter of Sarah (née Butler) Duncan and Alexander Duncan. Her father was originally from Parkhill Arbroath, Scotland but moved to America, attended Yale University, and settled in Providence, Rhode Island. Sally was sister to W. Butler Duncan, a prominent banker and railroad executive. Before his death in 1885, they were the parents of:

- Sir John Adam Hay, 9th Baronet (1854–1895), who married Anne Milliken-Napier, daughter of Sir Robert Milliken-Napier, 9th Baronet, in 1881.
- Alexander Duncan Hay (1858–1881), a Lieutenant in the Royal Artillery who died unmarried while hunting in Leicestershire.
- Athole Stanhope Hay (1861–1933), who married Caroline Margaret Cunard, daughter of Sir Edward Cunard, 2nd Baronet, in 1890.
- Henrietta Louisa Hay (1862–1944), who died unmarried.
- Robert Butler Hay (1864–1912), who married Ella Bulkeley-Johnson, daughter of Francis Bulkeley Johnson, in 1899.
- Adele Hay (1867–1931), who married her first cousin, Hon. Charles Hay Scudamore-Stanhope in 1900.

Sir Robert died on 30 May 1885, at age 60, and was succeeded in the baronetcy by his eldest son, John. After his death, his widow moved to 7 Princess Gate, Hyde Park, London, where she died in 1910.

Baronetage of Nova Scotia
Preceded by Adam Hay	Baronet (of Smithfield and Haystoun); 1867–1885	Succeeded by John Adam Hay
