= List of listed buildings in Skene, Aberdeenshire =

This is a list of listed buildings in the parish of Skene in Aberdeenshire, Scotland.

== List ==
Name	Location	Date listed	Grid ref. (Note: Sometimes known as OSGB36, the grid reference (where provided) is based on the British national grid reference system used by the Ordnance Survey. • "Guide to National Grid". Ordnance Survey. • "Get-a-map". Ordnance Survey.)	Geo-coordinates	Notes	LB number (Note: Historic Environment Scotland assign a unique alphanumeric identifier to each designated site in Scotland, for listed buildings this always begins with "LB", for example "LB12345".)	Image
Skene House, Stableblock				57°10′42″N 2°22′53″W	Category B	16500	Upload Photo
Lodge, Skene House				57°10′10″N 2°23′03″W	Category C(S)	16503	Upload Photo
No. 1 Garlogie				57°08′24″N 2°21′48″W	Category C(S)	16507	Upload Photo
No. 3 Garlogie				57°08′24″N 2°21′48″W	Category C(S)	16510	Upload Photo
Skene Churchyard				57°09′33″N 2°19′39″W	Category C(S)	16515	Upload Photo
Manse Of Skene				57°09′48″N 2°19′36″W	Category B	16516	Upload Photo
Manse Of Skene, Sundial				57°09′49″N 2°19′38″W	Category B	16517	Upload Photo
Dovecot Kinmundy House				57°09′40″N 2°16′03″W	Category C(S)	16523	Upload Photo
East Lochside Farmhouse				57°09′36″N 2°20′33″W	Category B	16529	Upload Photo
Kirkton House, Walled Garden				57°09′27″N 2°19′27″W	Category B	16519	Upload Photo
Craigiedarg Cottages				57°10′11″N 2°23′28″W	Category C(S)	16504	Upload Photo
Nether Terryvale, Farmhouse				57°10′24″N 2°21′36″W	Category C(S)	16512	Upload Photo
Auchinclech				57°10′27″N 2°17′31″W	Category B	16524	Upload Photo
Easter Skene House, Walled Garden				57°09′47″N 2°19′54″W	Category B	16526	Upload Photo
Skene House, Including Terrace And Garden Ornaments				57°10′39″N 2°23′08″W	Category A	16530	Upload another image See more images
Garlogie Village Hall, Turbine And Engine House				57°08′23″N 2°21′41″W	Category A	16506	Upload Photo
Mill House, Garlogie				57°08′22″N 2°21′42″W	Category C(S)	16508	Upload Photo
No. 2 Garlogie				57°08′24″N 2°21′48″W	Category C(S)	16509	Upload Photo
Parish Church Of Skene				57°09′34″N 2°19′39″W	Category B	16514	Upload Photo
Easter Skene House				57°09′50″N 2°20′05″W	Category B	16527	Upload Photo
East Lochside, Steading				57°09′37″N 2°20′35″W	Category B	16528	Upload Photo
Kirkton House (Originally Kirkville)				57°09′26″N 2°19′31″W	Category B	16518	Upload Photo
Hopeman Cottage (Old Toll House) Elrick				57°09′00″N 2°17′47″W	Category B	16521	Upload Photo
Tower Lodges And Gates And Loch Of Skene Boathouse, Dunecht House				57°09′46″N 2°21′23″W	Category A	16505	Upload Photo
Kirkton Of Skene, Proctor's Orphanage Including Steading				57°09′32″N 2°19′04″W	Category C(S)	51131	Upload Photo
Skene House Cottage To West Of Stables Block				57°10′42″N 2°22′59″W	Category B	16501	Upload Photo
Bridgend Smithy				57°10′56″N 2°16′34″W	Category C(S)	16513	Upload Photo
Auchinclech, Steading				57°10′28″N 2°17′33″W	Category B	16525	Upload Photo
Skene House, Walled Garden				57°10′48″N 2°23′11″W	Category B	16502	Upload Photo
Garlogie House (Under Factor's House)				57°08′24″N 2°21′44″W	Category C(S)	16511	Upload Photo
Kirkton House, Dovecot				57°09′31″N 2°19′42″W	Category B	16520	Upload Photo
"The Shrine" Kinmundy House				57°09′39″N 2°16′04″W	Category C(S)	16522	Upload Photo

== Key ==
The scheme for classifying buildings in Scotland is:

- Category A: "buildings of national or international importance, either architectural or historic; or fine, little-altered examples of some particular period, style or building type."
- Category B: "buildings of regional or more than local importance; or major examples of some particular period, style or building type, which may have been altered."
- Category C: "buildings of local importance; lesser examples of any period, style, or building type, as originally constructed or moderately altered; and simple traditional buildings which group well with other listed buildings."

In March 2016 there were 47,288 listed buildings in Scotland. Of these, 8% were Category A, and 50% were Category B, with the remaining 42% being Category C.

== See also ==
- List of listed buildings in Aberdeenshire
