= Westhill Academy =

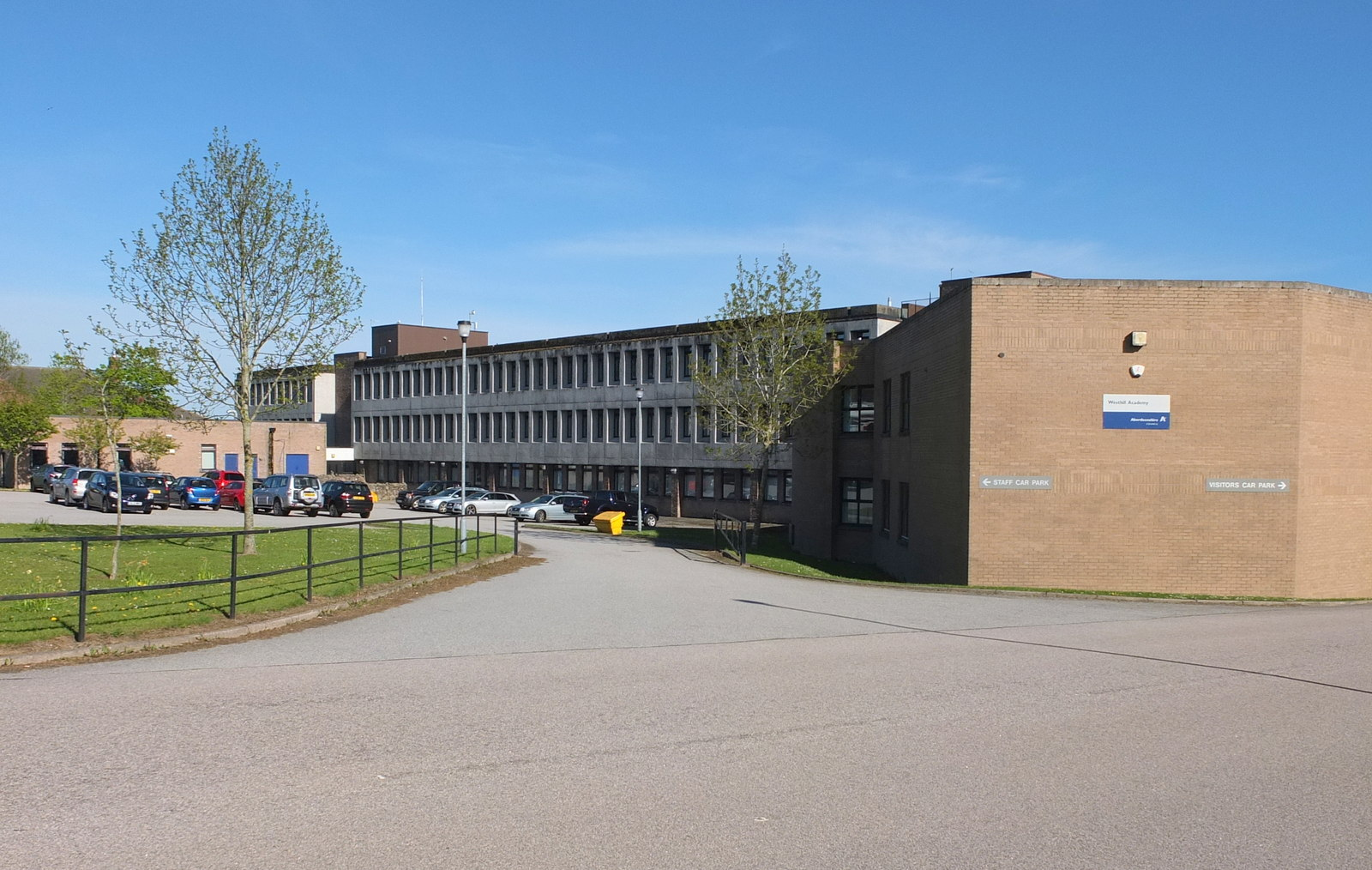
- The exterior of the school building in May 2013.

Location
- Hay's Way; Westhill, Aberdeenshire, AB32 6XZ; Scotland; 57.1554°N 2.2822°W

Information
- Type: Secondary school
- Established: 1979
- Local authority: Aberdeenshire Council
- Head teacher: Alison Reid
- Staff: 110 (approx)
- Gender: Co-educational
- Age: 11 to 18
- Enrolment: 1376 (approx)
- Houses: Arnhall, Brimmond, Carnie, Denman, Echt
- Colours: Green; Navy; Purple; Yellow
- School years: S1-S6
- Website: Westhill Academy

Westhill Academy is an Aberdeenshire Council secondary school in Westhill, near Aberdeen, Scotland, serving the Westhill, Elrick and Skene areas of Aberdeenshire. Its main feeder schools are Westhill Primary, Crombie Primary School, Elrick Primary and Skene Primary. School transport, before and after school, is provided for students who live in Skene.

Westhill Academy opened in the autumn of 1979 with buildings designed to accommodate 500 pupils. The school was extended in 1982 and then again in 1996 raising the capacity of the school to 1000 pupils. The roll of the school, in recent years, has fluctuated between 800 and 850 pupils. In 2019 the school celebrated its 40th anniversary. It was celebrated by inviting current and ex staff members to look at year books and to see how it has changed through the years.

== Notable former pupils ==
- Tim Baillie, canoeist
- Jack Grimmer, footballer
- George Hunter, rugby player
- Stuart MacBride, author
- Amy Manson, actress
- Paul Lawson, footballer
