= James Thomson (minister) =

James Thomson (9 May 1768 – 28 November 1855) was a Scottish minister and editor of the Encyclopædia Britannica.

== Life ==
Born on 9 May 1768 at Crieff in Perthshire, was the second son of Elizabeth Ewan and her husband, John Thomson. Thomas Thomson was his younger brother. He was educated at the parish school, and afterwards studied at the University of Edinburgh. He was licensed to preach by the presbytery of Haddington on 6 August 1793, and frequently assisted his uncle, John Ewan, minister of Whittingham, East Lothian.

On 26 August 1805 Thomson was ordained minister of Eccles, Berwickshire. In 1842 he received the honorary degree of DD from the University of St Andrews, and in 1847 he resigned his charge and retired to Edinburgh. In 1854 he moved to London, where he died on 28 November 1855.

== Works ==
In 1795 Thomson became associated with George Gleig, bishop of Brechin, as co-editor of the third edition of the Encyclopædia Britannica. He wrote articles himself, including those on "Scripture", "Septuagint", and "Superstition"; that on "Scripture" was retained in later editions. During the same period he prepared an edition of The Spectator with short biographies of the contributors (Newcastle, 1799, 8 volumes). In 1796 he became tutor to the sons of John Stirling of Kippendavie, and resigned his post on the Britannica to his brother Thomas. Both brothers were contributors to the Literary Journal founded in 1803 by James Mill, James writing the philosophic articles. In his country life he devoted himself to the study of the Bible in the original tongues. Thomson was also the author of:

- Rise, Progress, and Consequences of the new Opinions and Principles lately introduced into France, Edinburgh, 1799.
- Expository Lectures on St. Luke, London, 1849–51.
- Expository Lectures on the Acts of the Apostles, London, 1854.
- Sketch of the present State of Agriculture in Berwickshire in his brother's Annals of Philosophy.

== Family ==
On 10 October 1805 Thomson married Elizabeth, eldest daughter of James Skene of Aberdeen, second son of George Skene of Skene, Aberdeenshire. She died in 1851, leaving a daughter Eliza and three sons, Robert Dundas Thomson, James Thomson, chairman of the government bank of Madras and Andrew Skene Thomson.
