= Sir John Hay, 5th Baronet =

Scottish baronet, banker and landowner

Sir John Hay, Bt
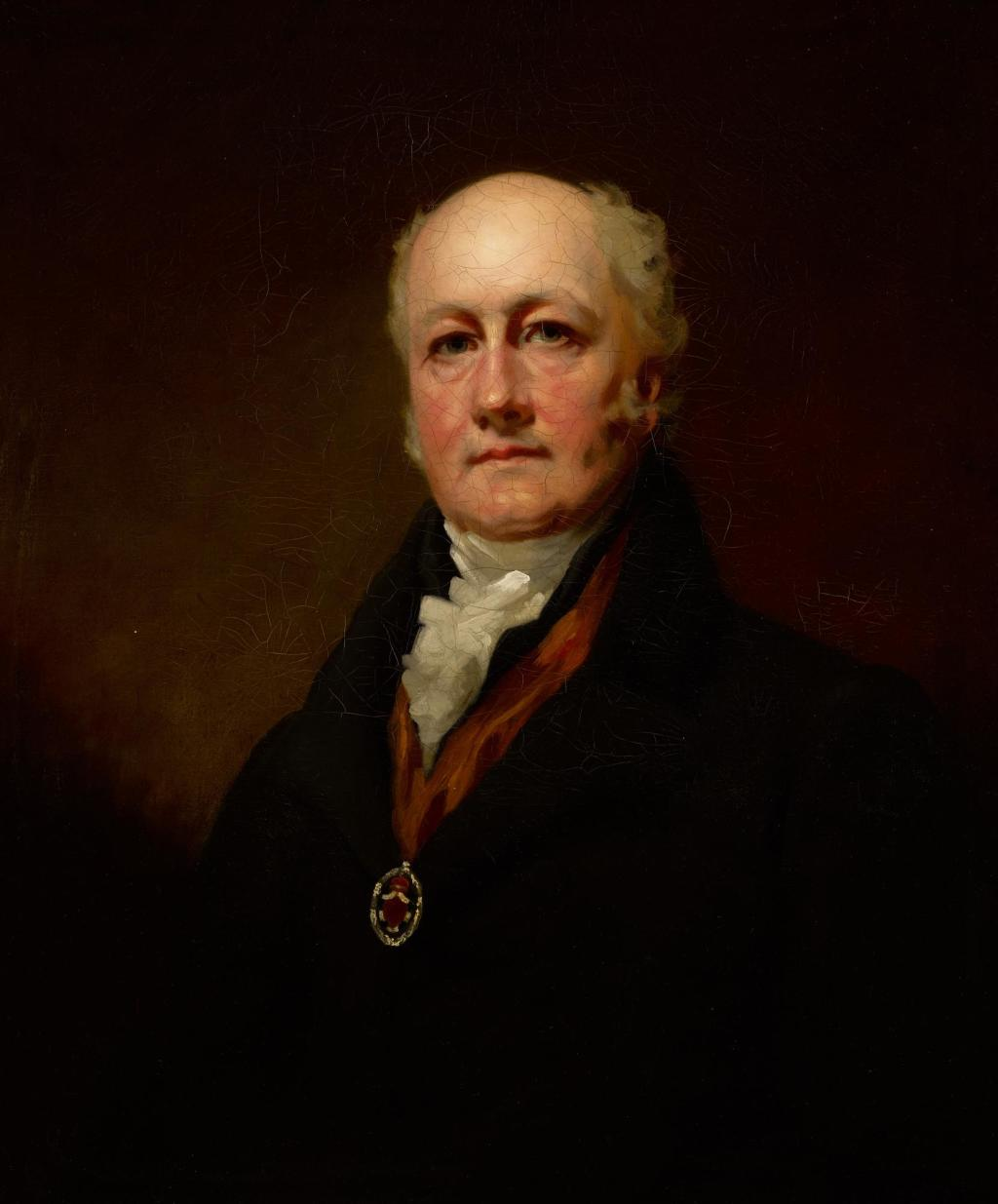
- Portrait of Sir John, studio of Sir Henry Raeburn
- Born: 15 January 1755
- Died: 23 May 1830 (aged 75)
- Spouse: Hon. Mary Elizabeth Forbes (after 1785)
- Parent(s): Sir James Hay, 4th Baronet; Dorriel Campbell

Sir John Hay, 5th Baronet of Smithfield and Haystoun (15 January 1755 – 23 May 1830) was a Scottish baronet, banker and landowner.

== Early life ==
Hay was born on 15 January 1755. He was the son of Dorriel Campbell and Sir James Hay, 4th Baronet, who claimed title 1805 after it had been dormant since the death of his great-grandfather's "degenerate third cousin" Sir James Hay, 3rd Baronet in c. 1683. His father had attended Edinburgh University and was a physician in Edinburgh. His sister, Elizabeth Hay, was a noted singer with the Edinburgh Music Society based in St Cecilia's Hall, who married Sir William Forbes, 6th Baronet.

== Career ==
In 1774, Hay was apprenticed in the Edinburgh banking house of his brother-in-law, Sir William Forbes of Pitsligo. "He became a partner in the firm of Forbes, Hunter and Company in 1782, married into the Scottish aristocracy in 1785, built a house at Kingsmeadows, Peebles and accumulated much property in the burgh."

Upon the death of his father on 21 October 1810, he succeeded as the 5th Baronet Hay, of Smithfield, county Peebles in the Baronetage of Nova Scotia and was one of the "quiet country gentlemen set" of Edinburgh society.

== Personal life ==
On 9 July 1785, Sir John married Hon. Mary Elizabeth Forbes (d. 1803), daughter of James Forbes, 16th Lord Forbes and Catherine Innes. Her brother was James Forbes, 17th Lord Forbes. Together, they lived at Haystoun, Peebles and were the parents of:

- Sir John Hay, 6th Baronet (1788–1838), MP for Peeblesshire who married Ann Preston in 1821.
- Mary Hay (1792–1877), who married her cousin, banker George Forbes, son of Sir William Forbes, 6th Baronet, in 1819.
- Sir Adam Hay, 7th Baronet (1795–1867), who married Henrietta Callender Grant, a daughter of William Grant, in 1823.
- Elizabeth Hay (1797–1859), who married Sir David Hunter-Blair, 3rd Baronet, son of Sir James Hunter Blair, 1st Baronet, in 1825.
- Grace Hay (1798–1837), who married Mathew Norman Macdonald Hume in 1831.
- Jane Hay (1799–1861), who married Charles Mackenzie Fraser, 10th of Inverallochy and 6th of Castle Fraser, son of Lt.-Gen. Alexander Mackenzie Fraser, 9th of Inverallochy, in 1817.

His wife died on 2 November 1803, before he succeeded to the baronetcy. Upon his death in 1830, he was succeeded by his eldest son, John, who was in 1838 succeeded by his brother, Adam.

=== Descendants ===
Through his son Adam, he was a grandfather of Sir Robert Hay, 8th Baronet, Dorothea Hay (wife of Henry Scudamore-Stanhope, 9th Earl of Chesterfield), and Louisa Grace Hay (wife of Brig.-Gen. James Wolfe Murray, son of James Wolfe Murray, Lord Cringletie).

Through his daughter Jane, he was a grandfather of Eleanor Jane Mackenzie-Fraser, who married Bishop George Tomlinson in 1855.

Baronetage of Nova Scotia
Preceded by James Hay	Baronet (of Smithfield and Haystoun); 1810–1830	Succeeded by John Hay
