= Isabella Wilson Legge =

Scottish Chartist and suffragette

- Born: Isabella Wilson; 16 August 1812
- Died: 27 May 1884 (aged 71); Aberdeen
- Known for: Scottish Chartist and Founder of the Aberdeen Female Radical Union

Isabella Wilson Legge (16 August 1812 - 27 May 1884) was a Chartist from Aberdeenshire in Scotland who campaigned for votes for women and the right to vote to be extended to all adults.

== Biography ==
Isabella Wilson was born in Aberdeenshire on 16 August 1812, the seventh of eight children. She was baptised in Skene, a small farming community. Her mother was Janet Pirie, a crofter, while her father, John Wilson, was a crofter and auctioneer.

Around 1835, she met and married a stonemason and chartist named John Legge. She decided to retain her maiden name as a middle name. Her husband was first a member of the Aberdeen Working Men's Association and would go on to become the first chairman of Aberdeen Charter Union, the organisation of the Aberdeen Chartists.

Most of the members were mill workers.

=== The Aberdeen Female Radical Union ===
After their marriage, the newlyweds moved to Aberdeen, where she founded the Aberdeen Female Radical Union circa 1839. This was a Chartist organisation and the 18 women members she presided over would meet regularly in the Temperance Hotel at 41 Queen Street.

The group hosted notable Chartist visitors to Aberdeen, including Feargus O’Connor in 1841 and T. S. Duncombe in 1843. By way of welcome, both received gifts from the Female Radicals of a tartan plaid and a silver brooch.

In a statement dated 12th November 1841, the Female Radicals wrote that:

"while we are compelled to share the misery of our fathers, our husbands, our brothers, and our lovers, we are determined to have a share in their struggles to be free, and to cheer them in their onward march for liberty."

Then in 1842, the group issued an address to their countrywomen, signed by Mary Angus, which included the following:

‘It has been stated that women should not meddle with politics . . . if politics did not meddle with them then the prohibition might be just – but the woman who values her home will endeavour to drive everything from it that threatens to do injury to its welfare . . .’

== Later life and death ==
Legge was widowed in 1872 and died in her home in Balmoral Place, Aberdeen on 27 May 1884 of apoplexy.

== Personal life ==
She had five children, all of whom were given the middle name ‘Wilson’.
