= Sir William John Milliken-Napier, 8th Baronet =

Scottish politician (1789–1852)

Sir William John Milliken-Napier, 8th Baronet of Merchiston (1788 – 4 February 1852) was a Scottish gentleman.

== Early life ==
William John Milliken-Napier was born in 1788 into the Napier family of Merchiston, Scotland. He was the son of Col. Robert John Milliken-Napier of Culcreuch, Stirling (son of William Napier of Culcreuch) and Anne Campbell (daughter of Robert Campbell of Downie). He was a descendant of John Napier, the inventor of logarithms.

== Career ==
On 17 March 1817, he proved his succession to the dormant baronetcy of Merchiston, and became the 8th Baronet, which had been dormant since the death of Archibald Napier, 3rd Lord Napier in 1683. He served as convener of County Renfrew.

== Personal life ==
On 11 November 1815, he married Eliza Christian, daughter of John Stirling of Kippendavie and Mary Graham. They had three children:

- Mary Milliken-Napier (1817–1902), who married Robert Speir, of Burnbrae, Renfrewshire and Culdees, Perthshire, in 1839.
- Sir Robert John Milliken-Napier, 9th Baronet (1818–1884), who married Anne Salisbury Meliora Ladaveze Adlercron, daughter of John Ladaveze Adlercron (a grandson of Lt.-Gen. John Adlercron, Commander-in-Chief, India), in 1850.
- John Stirling Milliken-Napier (1820–1891), who married Janet Brown, a daughter of Andrew Brown, in 1845.

Sir William died on 4 February 1852 and was succeeded in the baronetcy by his eldest son, Robert.

Baronetage of Nova Scotia
Dormant Title last held by Archibald Napier	Baronet (of Merchistoun); 1817–1852	Succeeded by Robert Milliken-Napier
