= Sir Adam Hay, 7th Baronet =

Scottish baronet and politician

Sir Adam Hay, 7th Baronet (14 December 1795 – 18 January 1867) was a Scottish baronet and politician.

== Early life ==
Hay was born on 14 December 1795 at Edinburgh, Scotland. He was the younger son of Sir John Hay, 5th Baronet of Smithfield and Haystoun FRSE (1755–1830), banker and landowner, and Mary Elizabeth Forbes. He was the brother of Sir John Hay, 6th Baronet, whom he succeeded in the family baronetcy, and his uncle was the banker, George Forbes FRSE.

== Career ==
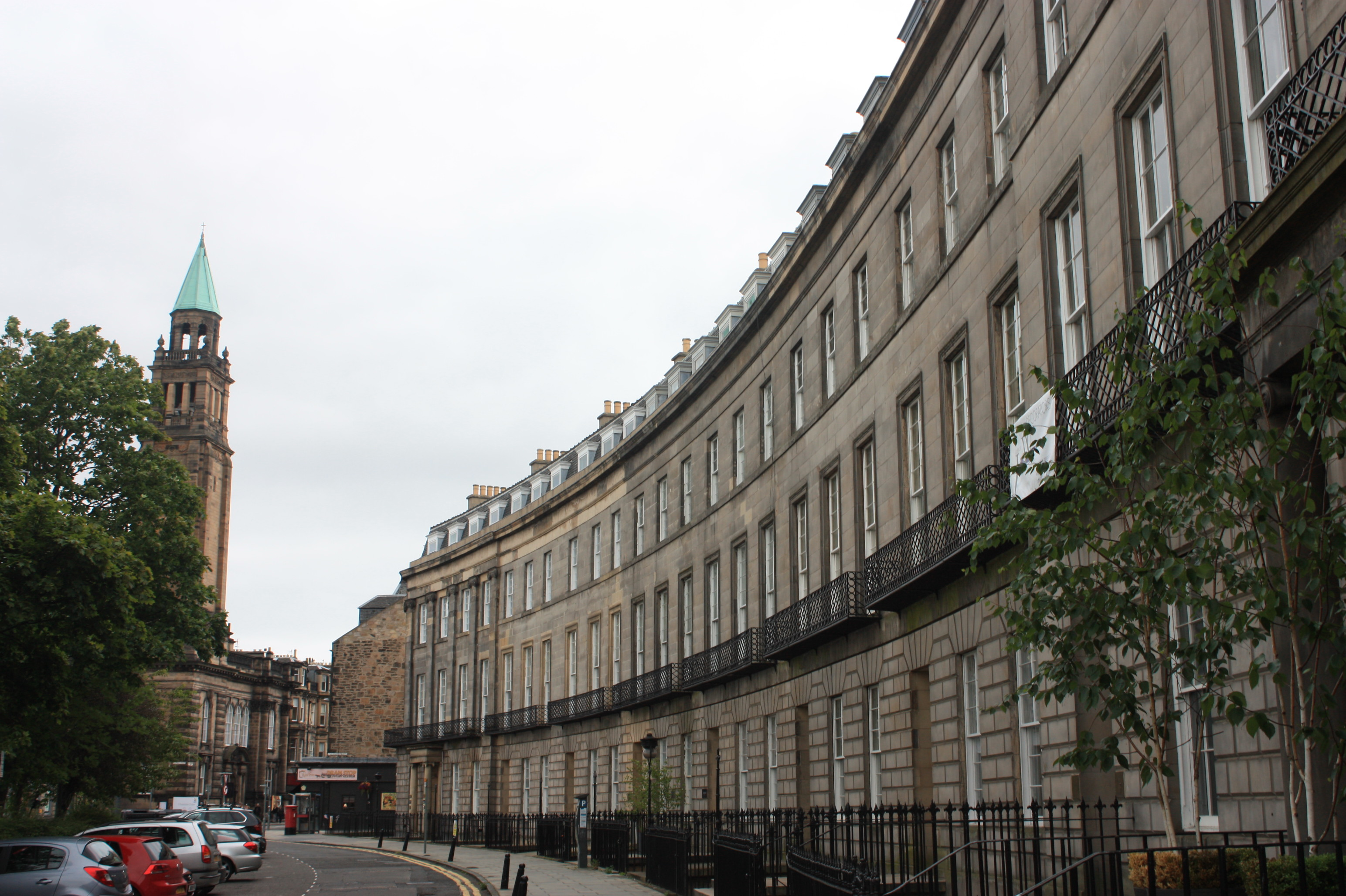
Atholl Crescent in Edinburgh

He was the Member of Parliament (MP) for Lanark Burghs from 1826 to 1830.

== Personal life ==
On 23 March 1823, he married Henrietta Callender Grant, a daughter of William Grant and Dorothea Dalrymple. Her sister, Louisa Grant, was the wife of the Hon. William Keith-Falconer (younger son of the 6th Earl of Kintore). Together, Adam and Henrietta lived at 12 Atholl Crescent in Edinburgh's West End, and were the parents of several children, including:

- Sir Robert Hay, 8th Baronet (1825–1885), who married Sarah "Sally" Duncan, a daughter of Alexander Duncan. Her brother was W. Butler Duncan, a prominent banker and railroad executive.
- Dorothea Hay (c. 1828–1923), who married Henry Scudamore-Stanhope, 9th Earl of Chesterfield.
- Louisa Grace Hay (c. 1831–1883), who married, as his second wife, Brig.-Gen. James Wolfe Murray, son of James Wolfe Murray, Lord Cringletie.

Upon his death on 18 January 1867 at Cannes, France, he was succeeded in the baronetcy by his son, Robert. He is buried at the Cross Kirk, Peebles in an enclosed area on its south side.

Parliament of the United Kingdom
Preceded by Henry Monteith	Member of Parliament for Lanark Burghs; 1826 – 1830	Succeeded by Henry Monteith
Baronetage of Nova Scotia
Preceded by John Hay	Baronet (of Smithfield and Haystoun); 1838 – 1867	Succeeded by Robert Hay
