= Skene Parish Church =

Church in Aberdeenshire, Scotland

Coordinates: 57°9′33″N 2°19′33″W

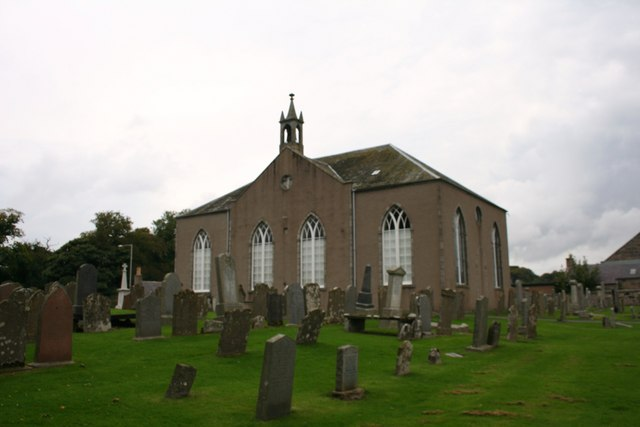
Skene Church at Kirkton of Skene

Kingshill Parish Church is a congregation of the Church of Scotland in Skene, part of the Presbytery of North East and Northern Isles. The parish has two places of worship, Skene Church in Kirkton of Skene and Trinity Church in Westhill. The current minister is the Rev. Dr. Daniel H. Spencer.

== Skene Church ==
The earliest record of a church in Skene dates from 1296, when one Patrick of Skene signed himself as the "Clericus of Skene". The medieval building stood by the Roman road which ran from Normandykes to Donside. Records of the Skene Kirk Session begin in 1676. A 17th-century building stood on the site of the present Skene Church.

Skene Church was built in 1801, a plain rectangular building with the pulpit in the centre of the south wall. As this was one of the long walls, the congregation were spread to the left and right of the minister. A gallery ran round the other three walls, and there were doors in each of the end walls. In 1932, the interior was entirely refurnished and the sanctuary moved to the east wall, the door on that wall being blocked off. The gallery was replaced with a smaller one on the west wall. In accordance with the changes in thinking on Scottish church architecture, the communion table now took centre place, with the pulpit on the left. A mortsafe outside the west door is an interesting historical object.

After the disruption of 1843, a Free Church was built near Kirkton. This congregation reunited with Skene parish in 1941. The old Free Church building was later used as a blacksmith's workshop.

In 1872, the congregation also built a mission hall in Lyne of Skene, which it kept until 1970.

== Trinity Church ==
Trinity Church at Westhill is an ecumenical project involving the Church of Scotland, the Scottish Episcopal Church and the Roman Catholic Church; thus the dedication to the Trinity echos the three denominations in co-operation. This 1981 building was extended in 2003 and is a hall church with moveable chairs, allowing flexibility of use. The 2003 extension to the building added a second hall to the complex, making it possible for two denominations to have services simultaneously. The extension is predominantly used by the Sunday School during worship. Work has begun on constructing a new church to house the Scottish Episcopal congregation in Westhill.

== See also ==
- List of Church of Scotland parishes
