= Sir John Hay of Alderston, 1st Baronet =

Sir John Hay of Alderston, 1st Baronet (died 1706) was created a Baronet of Nova Scotia on 22 February 1703. He was the son of Thomas Hay of Hermiston (died 1607) one of the Clerks of the Court of Session and a Clerk of the Privy Council of Scotland, and Anna, daughter of Sir John Gibson of Pentland, Baronet.

Hay acquired the feudal barony of Alderston in East Lothian, which had long been a possession of the Hepburn family.

He married 27 April 1693, Catherine, daughter of Sir George Suttie, 1st Baronet of Balgonie, and had issue: two sons, his successors, and three daughters. When Hay died in 1706, his children were still very young. His eldest son and heir, Sir Thomas Hay of Alderston, was an infant, and fell under the care of his mother and his two uncles.

Baronetage of Nova Scotia
New creation	Baronet (of Alderston); 1703–1706	Succeeded by Thomas Hay
