= Sarah Boudens =

Canadian canoeist

Sarah Boudens-Baillie (born February 28, 1983, in Pembroke, Ontario) is a Canadian slalom canoeist who competed at the international level from 2000 to 2012. She was eliminated in the qualifying round of the K1 event at the 2008 Summer Olympics in Beijing, finishing in 19th place.

She is married to 2012 Olympic champion in C2 Tim Baillie.

== World Cup individual podiums ==
Season	Date	Venue	Position	Event
2006	20 Aug 2006	Madawaska	3rd	K1^{1}

^{1} Pan American Championship counting for World Cup points
