= Robert Thomson (physician) =

British physician and chemist

Dr Robert Dundas Thomson FRSE FRS FRCP FCS (21 September 1810 – 17 August 1864) was a British physician and chemist and a pioneer of public sanitation. He worked as an academic, medical officer of health and author.

== Life ==
He was the son of Rev James Thomson, minister of Eccles in Berwickshire, and his wife Elizabeth Skene, daughter of James Skene of Aberdeen, uncle of James Skene of Rubislaw. He was born at Eccles manse on 21 September 1810. He was educated nearby at Duns Grammar School.

He studied for the medical profession in Edinburgh and Glasgow. In Glasgow he studied chemistry under his uncle Thomas Thomson, then professor there. He graduated ChM at Glasgow in 1831. In 1840 he was at Giessen under Justus Liebig. He obtained his doctorate (MD) from Glasgow University.

After making a voyage to India and China as assistant surgeon in the service of the East India Company, Thomson settled as a physician in London about 1835, and took part in the establishment of the Blenheim Street school of medicine. In his early career he applied chemical knowledge to the investigation of physiological question, including the composition of the blood, especially in cholera. He was employed by government to make experiments on the food of cattle, and to analyse the water supplied by the London utility companies. His researches on the constituents of food in relation to animals contributed to the development of veterinary nutrition.

In 1841 Thomson went to Glasgow as deputy professor and assistant to his uncle, the professor of chemistry, who was in failing health. He was unsuccessful as a candidate for the chair at his uncle's death in 1852, but, returning to London, was appointed lecturer on chemistry at St. Thomas's Hospital on the retirement of Dr. Henry Beaumont Leeson.

Thomson was elected a Fellow of the Royal Society of Edinburgh on 2 December 1850, upon the proposal of his uncle and father-in-law Professor Thomas Thomson. He was elected a Fellow of the Royal Society of London on 1 June 1854

In 1856, when medical officers of health were appointed under the Metropolitan Local Management Act, Thomson was the successful candidate for Marylebone. He set up a system of inspection in the parish; and when his colleagues formed themselves into an association of health officers (the Metropolitan Association of Medical Officers of Health), they appointed him their president. He became known as an authority on sanitary matters, and was employed by the registrar-general to make a monthly report of the amount of impurity in the supplies of the London water companies.

He became a member of the College of Physicians of London in 1859, and was elected a fellow the year of his death.

At the time of his death he was president of the Meteorological Society of London. He was also a member of the Botanical Society of Edinburgh and the Medico-Chirurgical Society of London.

He resided in London at 41 York Terrace, Regent's Park, and died at his brother's residence, Dunstable House, Richmond, on 17 August 1864.

== Family ==
He married his first cousin, a daughter of Thomas Thomson.

== Works ==
Thomson contributed numerous papers to British and foreign medical and scientific journals. His independent publications included:

- ‘Records of General Science,’ 1835.
- ‘British Annual and Epitome of the Progress of Science,’ 1837.
- ‘Digestion: the influence of Alcoholic Fluids on that Function, and on the Value of Health and Life,’ London, 1841.
- ‘Experimental Researches on the Food of Animals and the Fattening of Cattle, with Remarks on the Food of Man,’ 1846; American editions, 1846 and 1856.
- ‘School Chemistry, or Practical Rudiments of the Science,’ 1848; 2nd ed. 1862.
- ‘Cyclopædia of Chemistry, Mineralogy, and Physiology,’ 1854.
- ‘Report to Government on the Waters, &c., of London during Cholera,’ 1854.
- ‘The British Empire,’ 1856.
- ‘Annual Report on the Health of the Parish of St. Marylebone,’ 1857.
