= Annals of Philosophy =

Annals of Philosophy; or, Magazine of Chemistry, Mineralology, Mechanics, Natural History, Agriculture and the Arts
- Discipline: Natural philosophy
- Language: English
- Edited by: Thomas Thomson

Publication details
- History: 1813-1827
- Publisher: Robert Baldwin (United Kingdom)
- Frequency: Monthly

Standard abbreviations
- ISO 4: Ann. Philos.

Links
- Online archive

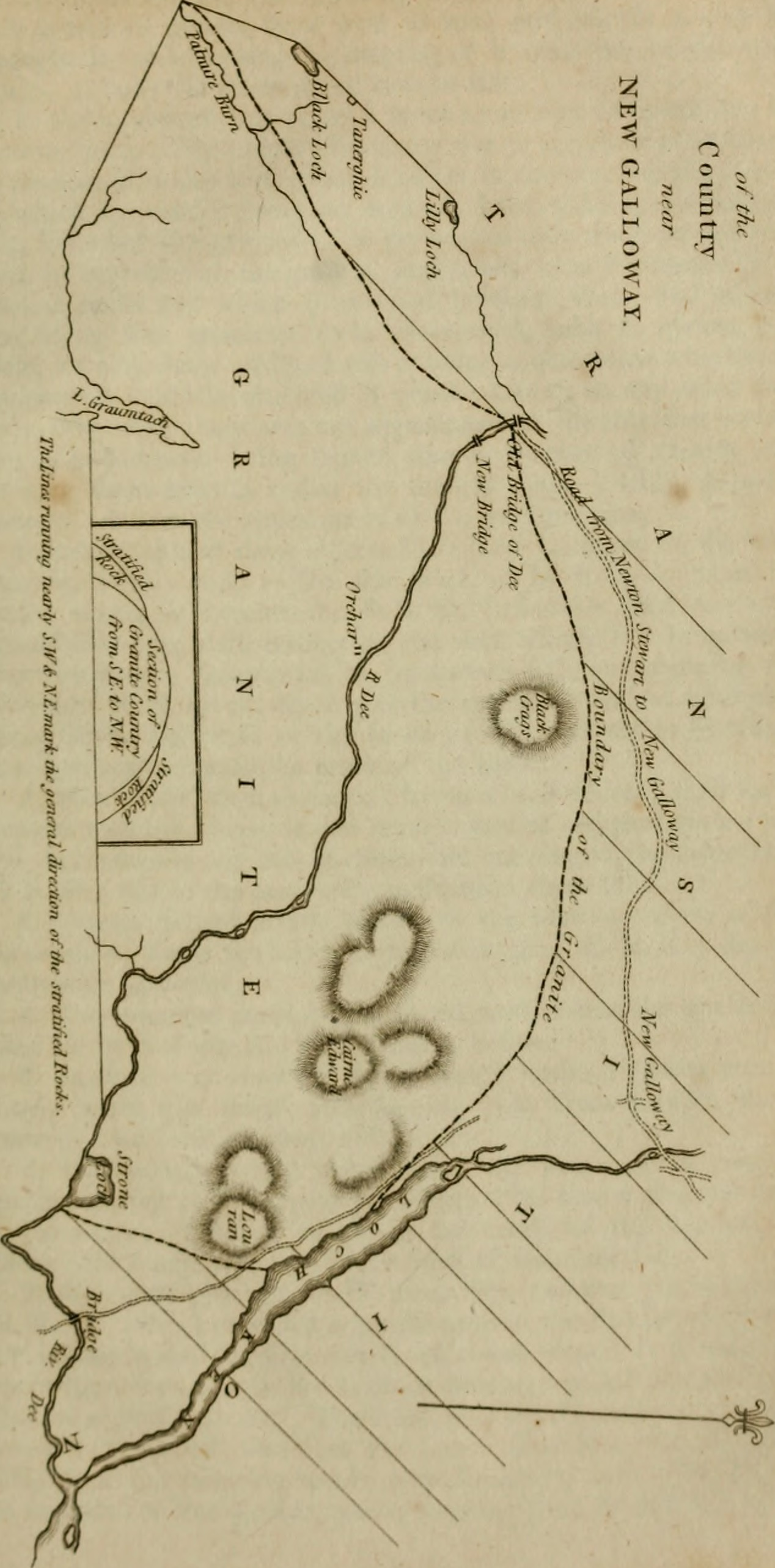

Annals of Philosophy; or, Magazine of Chemistry, Mineralology, Mechanics, Natural History, Agriculture and the Arts was a learned journal founded in 1813 by the Scottish chemist Thomas Thomson. It shortly became a leader in its field of commercial scientific periodicals. Contributors included John George Children, Edward Daniel Clarke, Philip Crampton, Alexander Crichton, James Cumming, John Herapath, William George Horner, Thomas Dick Lauder, John Miers, Matthew Paul Moyle, Robert Porrett, James Thomson, and Charles Wheatstone.

Thomson edited it until 1821, when he was succeeded in 1821 by Richard Phillips. The journal was bought by Richard Taylor in 1827, and closed down for the benefit of the Philosophical Magazine.

The Annals of Philosophy were issued monthly following a standard pattern. Often the first article was a biographical article (10 pages) on a living or recently deceased scientist. This was then followed by a series of extended pieces (5-10 pages) on particular topics, sometimes by eminent authors. Then there were shorter news items and correspondence. Summaries followed: first of the proceedings of learned bodies (Royal Society, Linnean, French Institute -if available: the Napoleonic Wars made communications with the continent difficult at first, etc.), then of patents, and finally of new books. The last section was a meteorological journal. Every six months a title page, index, and preface were issued which could be bound before the six monthly issues to make a half-yearly volume. Including front matter, volumes were just under 500 pages each.
