= Westhill, Aberdeenshire =

Town in Aberdeenshire, Scotland

Coordinates: 57.154°N 2.284°W

Westhill: Scottish Gaelic: Cnoc Shuas; Local Name: "Westhill"
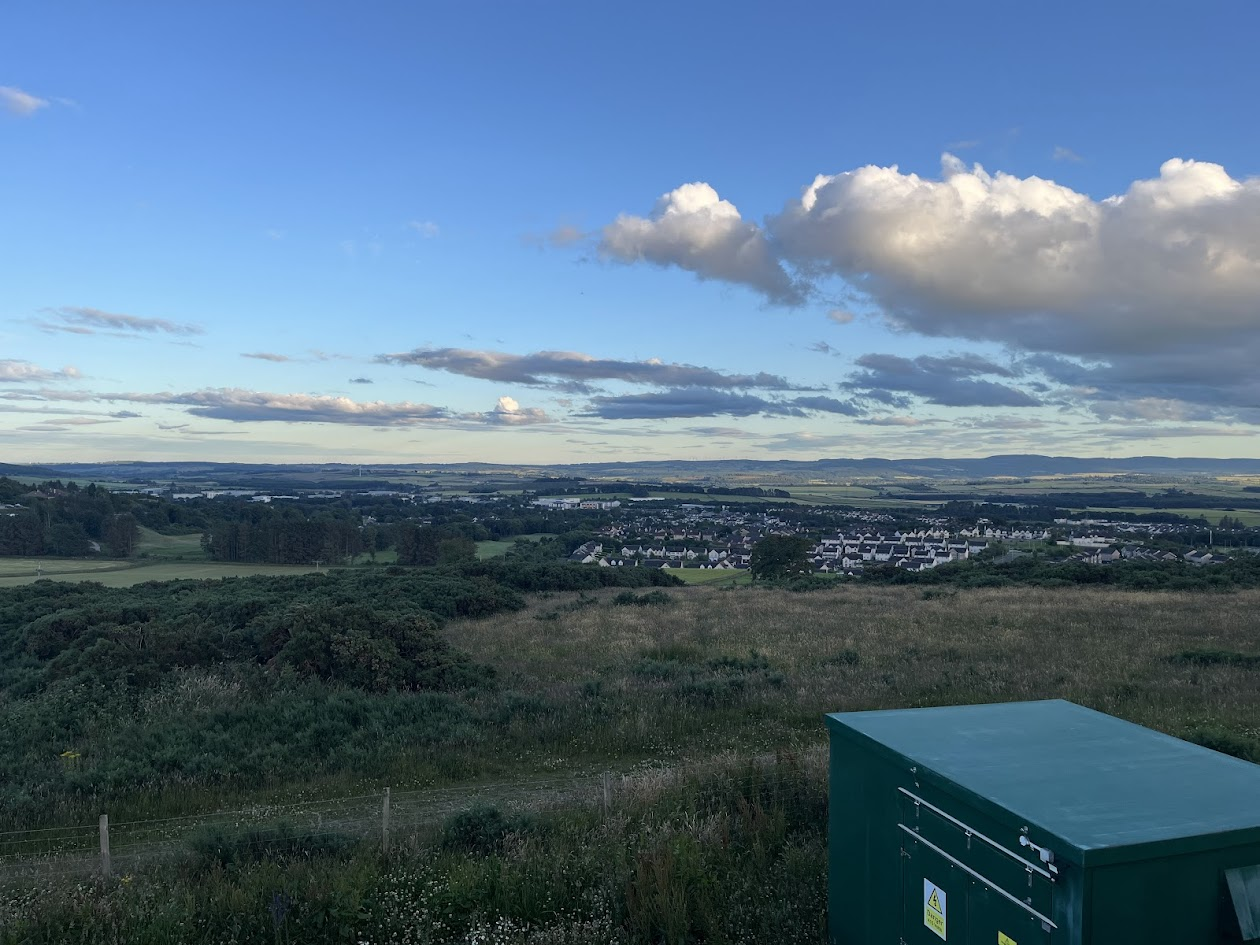
- View of Westhill from a hill behind the town

- Location within Aberdeenshire
- Population: 12,110 (2020)
- OS grid reference: NJ828070
- Council area: Aberdeenshire
- Lieutenancy area: Aberdeen
- Country: Scotland
- Sovereign state: United Kingdom
- Post town: WESTHILL
- Postcode district: AB32
- Dialling code: 01224
- Police: Scotland
- Fire: Scottish
- Ambulance: Scottish
- UK Parliament: West Aberdeenshire and Kincardine
- Scottish Parliament: Aberdeenshire West

Westhill is a suburban town in Aberdeenshire, Scotland, located 7 miles (11 km) west of the city of Aberdeen. As of 2022, it has a population of 11,750, making it one of the largest towns in Aberdeenshire.

The town is a blend of villages and farms that were gradually incorporated during its expansion in the latter half of the 20th century, most notably Elrick. It has a swimming pool, shopping centre, library, golf club and nature reserve.

== Origin ==
The creation of Westhill just outside Aberdeen was the idea of local solicitor Ronald Fraser Dean in 1963. With the backing of the former Aberdeen District Council (see Aberdeen City Council), the Secretary of State for Scotland and supported financially by Ashdale Land and Property Company Ltd., the new settlement of Westhill was created upon the old farming land. Since the construction of the first houses in 1968, Westhill has undergone a gradual expansion, much of which is tied to the North East's oil and gas economy. In 2007/8 a major expansion of the industrial estate brought several thousand workers to the area. Most of these are in specialist sub-sea engineering oil service companies, making Westhill a world centre in sub-sea engineering.

The name Westhill was created in 1859 when John Anderson from Strichen bought the adjoining small estates of Wester Kinmundy and Blackhills. Both of these names were very old, dating back to at least the 16th Century, but Anderson seems not to have liked them. He therefore created the name Westhill from the other two names. This is recorded in the Register of Sasines 2 December 1859.

== Growth of the town ==
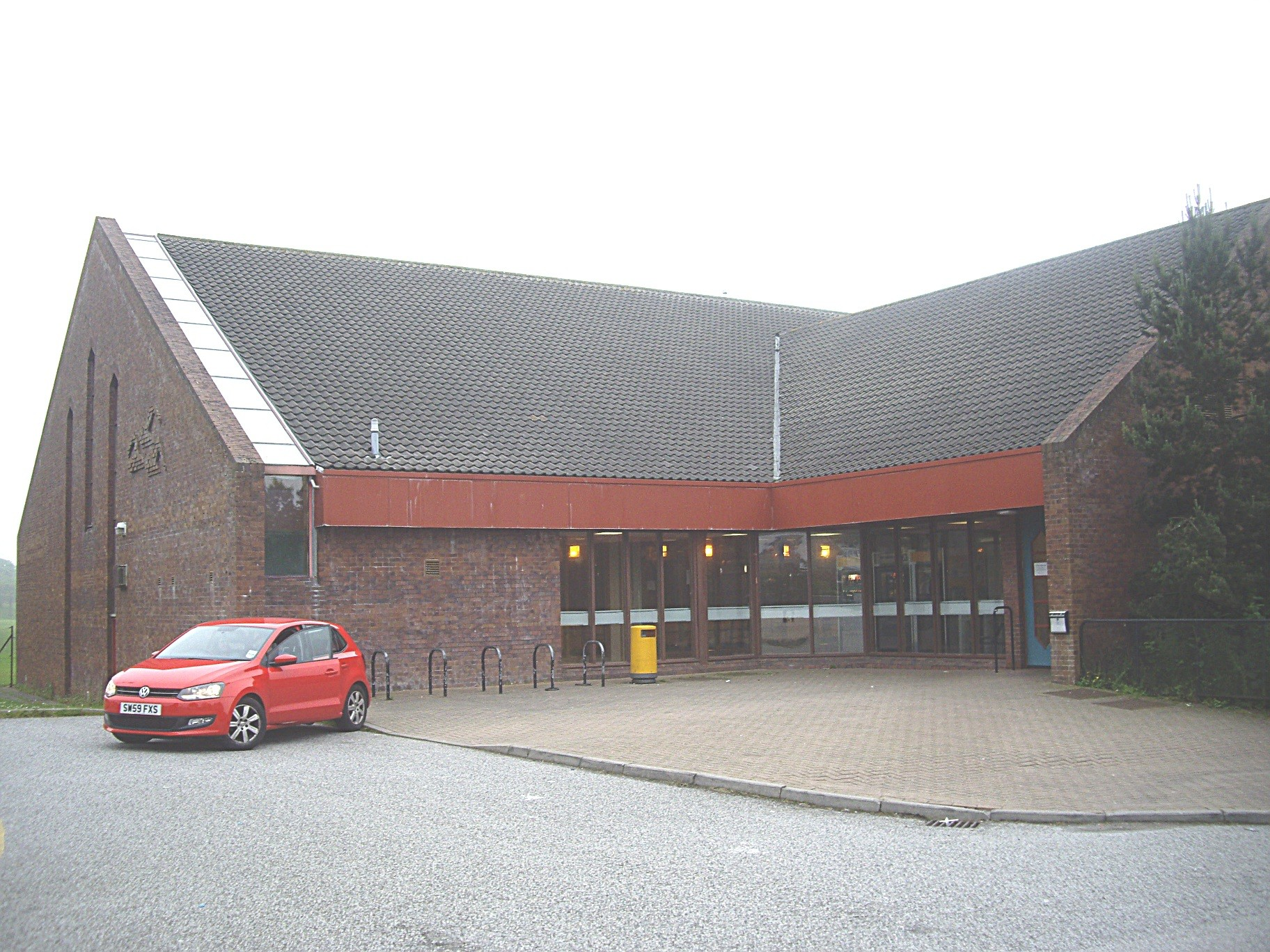
Swimming Pool, Westhill

Major housing expansions are under way at Elrick and to the west of Westhill. Many new housing estates are being built, primarily from well known companies such as Stewart Milne and Bett Homes.

The town of Westhill covers the area that was the Western Kinmundy and Blackhills Farming areas.

Westhill Business Park is also growing, with an increasing number of companies creating offices in the park. Due to the demand for offices, many planning permission applications for using the unused land to the South-West have been submitted. The growth has been such that the Postal Area formerly known as Skene has been renamed Westhill, so that for postal purposes, the once two-horse-hamlet of Westhill now covers many square miles.

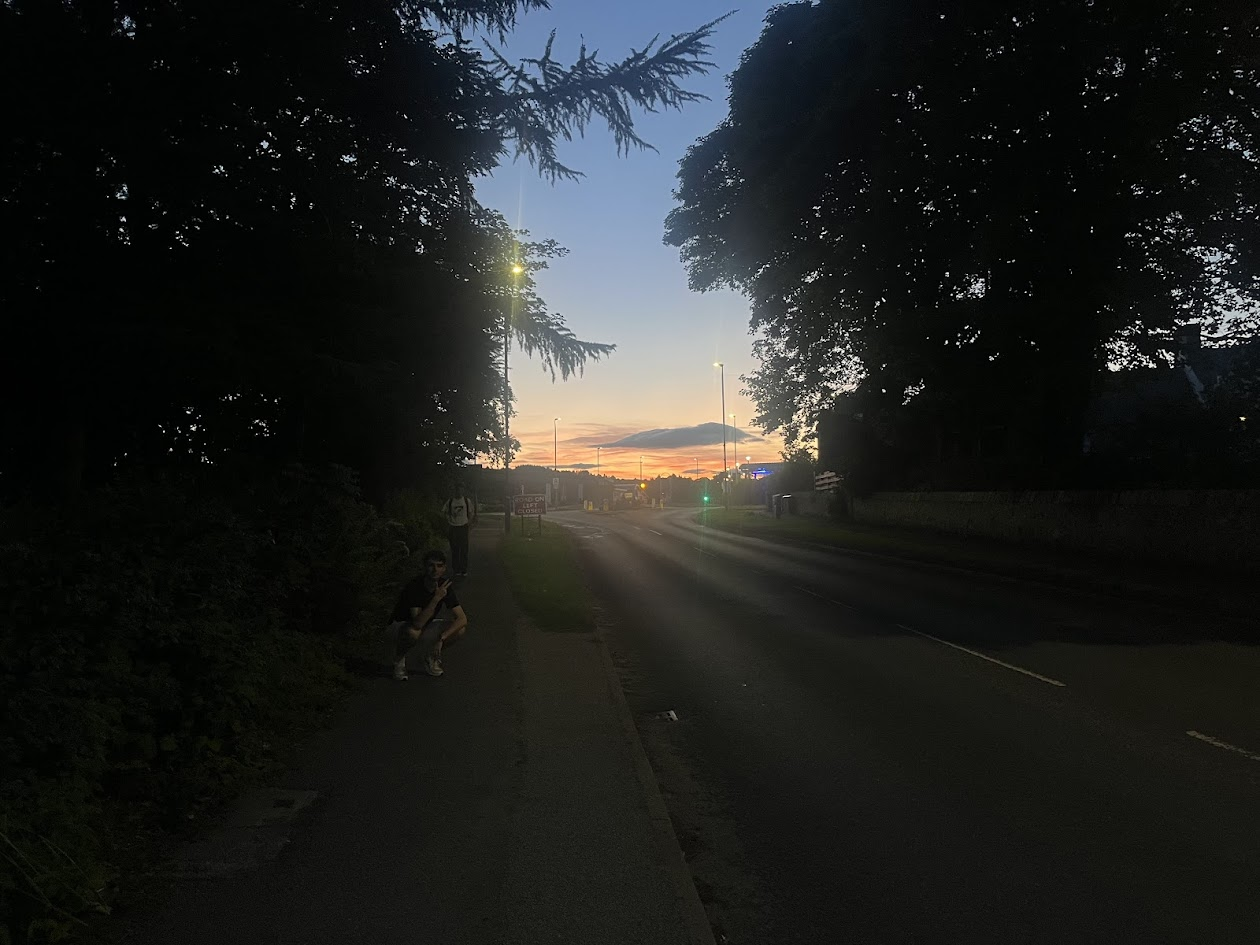
View of the road leading to the Westhill Shopping Centre

During the 1980s the local authority boundaries were to be moved such that Westhill would fall within the City of Aberdeen. This was seen as a cost-cutting venture, however the community set up a "Don't Move Westhill" campaign, and successfully stopped the town's absorption into Aberdeen. No new attempt to move the boundaries to include Westhill have been made since.

== Education ==
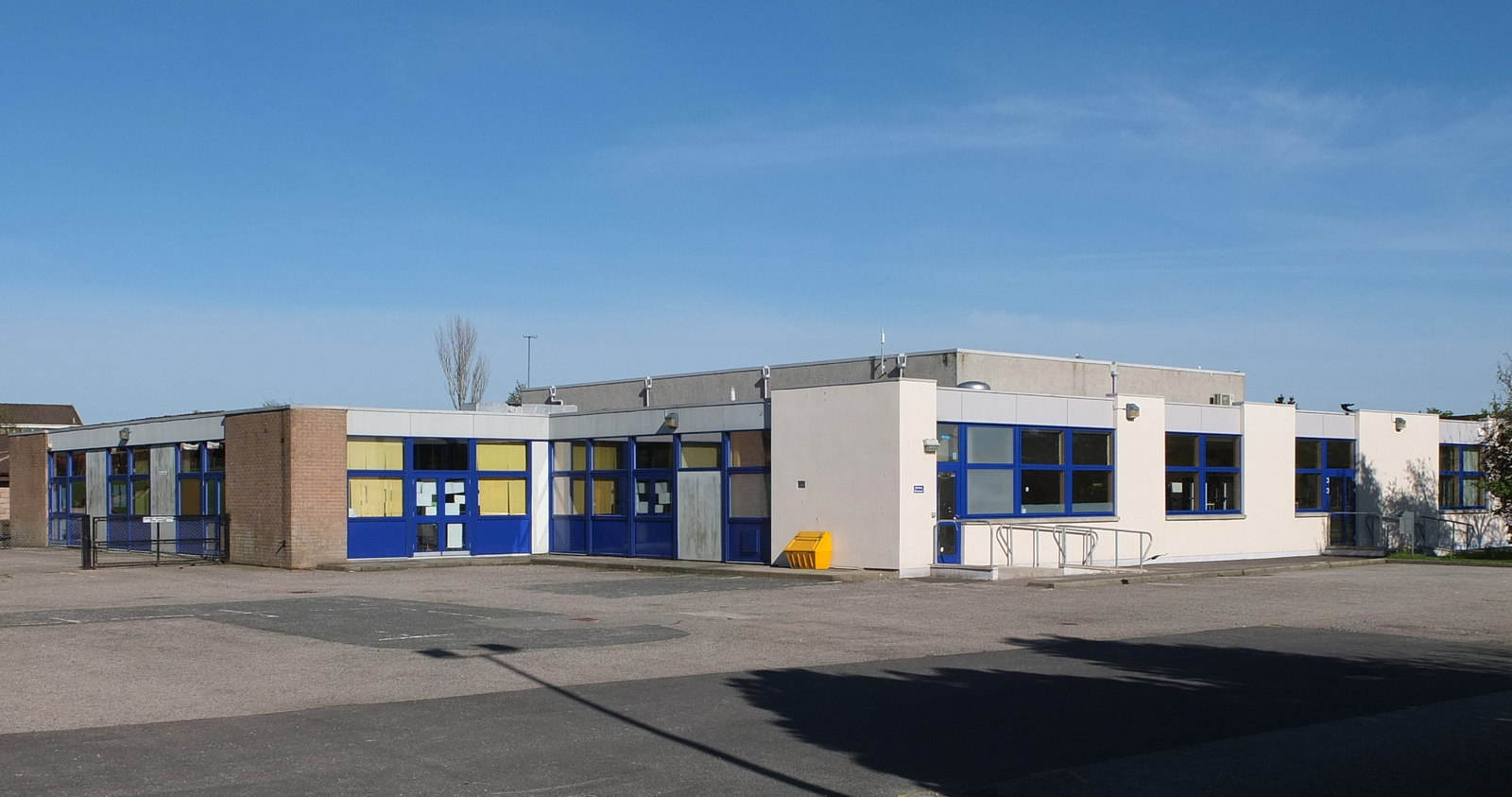
Westhill Primary School

Westhill has three primary schools:

- Crombie Primary,
- Elrick Primary,
- Westhill Primary.
- Skene School (Not in Westhill but some students are sent to Westhill Academy)

Westhill has a secondary school, Westhill Academy. The academy services Westhill, Skene and pupils in the surrounding area. It was opened in 1979, and since then many improvements and extensions have been made to increase the capacity of the academy.In 2025, the school ranked 23rd in Scotland's secondary school league tables, making it the highest-ranked school in Aberdeenshire.

All the schools in Westhill are run by Aberdeenshire Council.

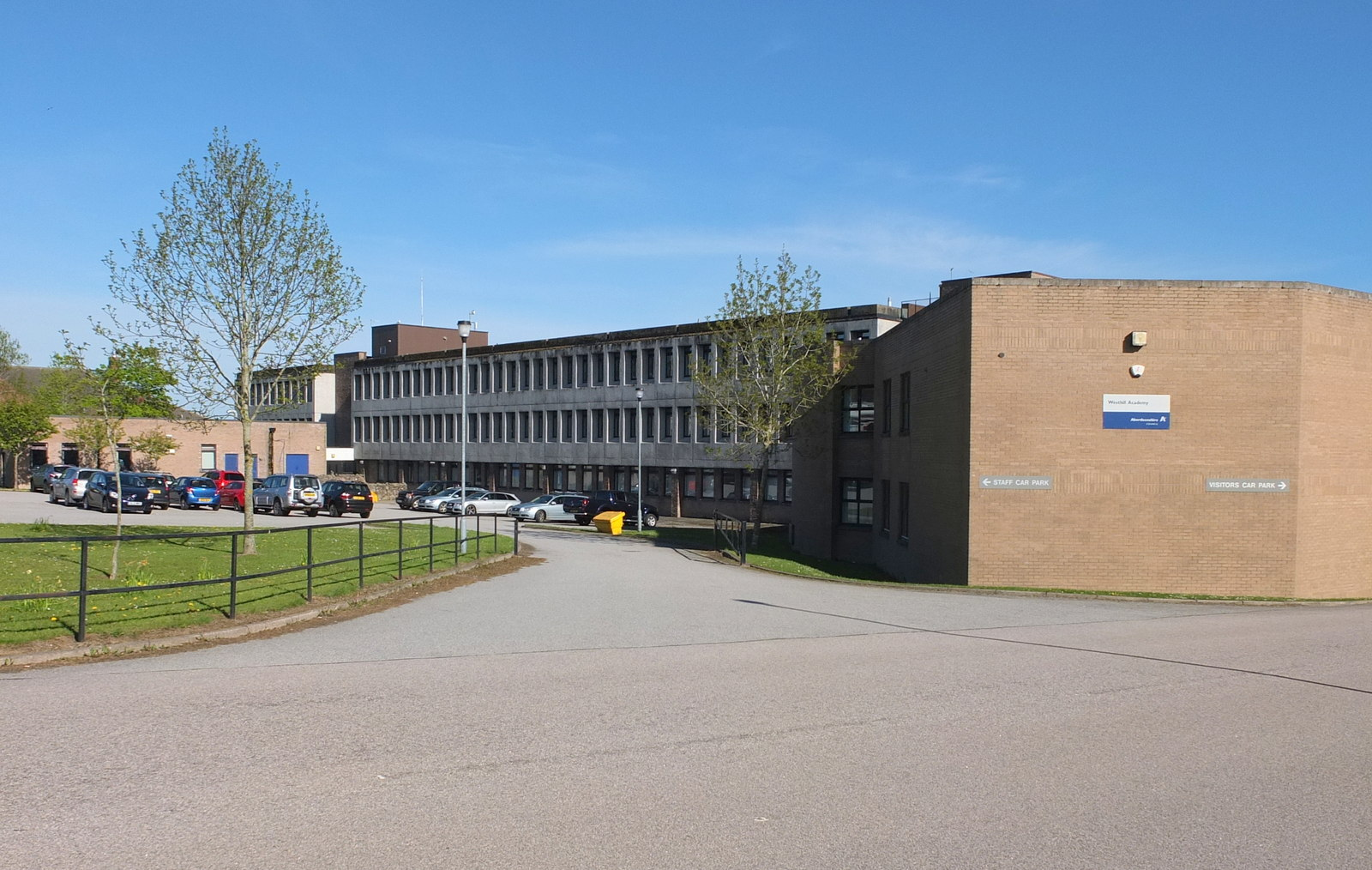
Westhill Academy

=== Demographics ===
The population in 2006 was 10,392. As of 2022, the population has grown to 11,750 people, 58.1% being aged from 18 to 64.

== Notable people ==
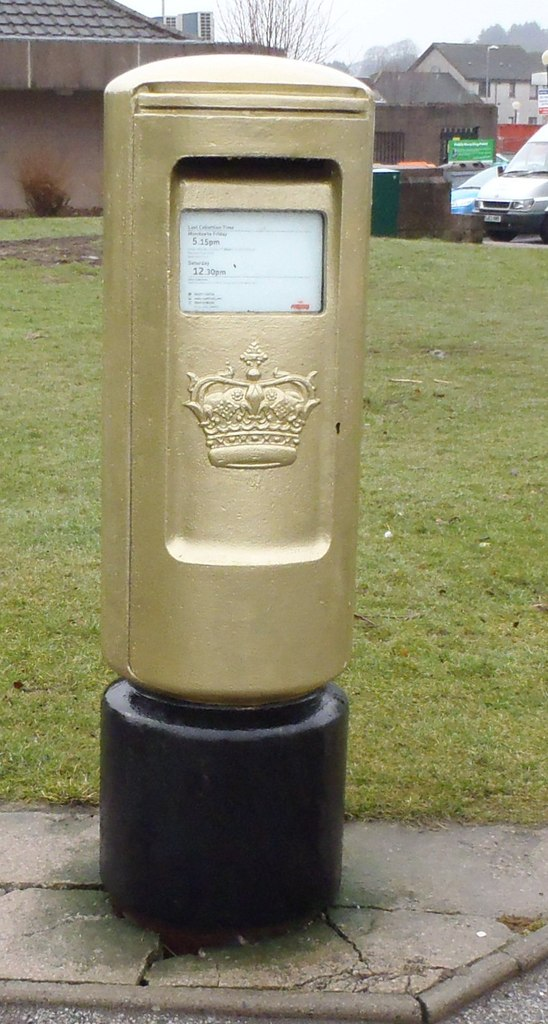
Second Gold Post Box on Westhill Drive, Westhill

Olympic canoeist Tim Baillie has a gold postbox on the concourse of Westhill Shopping Centre, commemorating his gold medal in the canoe slalom C-2 event at the 2012 Olympics. For a time, there were two gold postboxes on Westhill Drive. The first was painted to honour Baillie's achievement, but locals complained that its location was not central enough. As a result, another postbox, closer to the Shopping Centre, was also painted gold. However, during the Shopping Centre's renovation, the more central postbox was relocated inside the concourse, and the original postbox further up Westhill Drive was removed in 2024.

In part of the Grampian Regional Council Brotherfield Nursery, is the 2.5-acre (1 ha) home of The Beechgrove Garden, a gardening based television programme broadcast since 1978 on BBC Scotland. Episodes have broadcast from the site since 1996.

== Transport ==
=== Road ===
The A944 road runs straight through Westhill, and this connects Westhill with Kingswells and Aberdeen to the east, and as far as Mossat to the west. The B9119 branches off from the A944 just before Westhill and this route continues on towards Echt, eventually connecting to the A93.

The Aberdeen Bypass passes due east of the town, linking it to Aberdeen Airport, the A96 and Aberdeen's northern and southern suburbs, among other destinations further afield.

=== Bus ===
Westhill is served by Stagecoach Bluebird services 4, 5, 6 and 218:

Service 4 serves Aberdeen and Westhill, via Westburn Road, Aberdeen Royal Infirmary, Kingswells Park & Ride and Westhill every 2 hours Monday to Friday.

Service 5 Aberdeen to Elrick via Union Street, Albyn Place, Queens Road, Skene Road, Kingswells Park & Ride, Westhill Drive, Hays Way, Wellgrove Road, Straik Road & Carnie Crescent loop same in reverse. This service operates every 30 minutes.

Service 6 Aberdeen to Westhill (Berryhill) via Union Street, Albyn Place, Queens Road, Skene Road, Kingswells Park & Ride, Westhill Drive, Hays Way, Old Skene Road, Broadshade Road & Broadshade Avenue same in reverse. This service operates every 30 minutes.

Primefour and Arnhall business park / Total is served at peak times.

Service 218 Alford, Sauchen, Dunecht, Skene connects Westhill & Elrick to Aberdeen Union Square via Kingswells Park and Ride, Lang Stracht and Aberdeen Royal Infirmary every 3 hours Monday to Saturday, with no service running on Sundays.

== Religion ==
Westhill has several active church congregations. Trinity Church is an ecumenical project that involved the Church of Scotland, the Scottish Episcopal Church and the Roman Catholic Church. The Episcopal Church have moved to a new larger church to the west.

In addition, evangelical services are also held by the Westhill Baptist Church located at the Westdyke Leisure Centre. In 2016, a Buddhist centre established at Kinmundy, Varapunya Meditation Centre offering Buddhist practice and meditation.
