= Hay baronets =

Baronetcy in the Baronetage of Nova Scotia

There have been four baronetcies created for persons with the surname Hay, all in the Baronetage of Nova Scotia. Two creations are extinct, one dormant and one extant. A fifth baronetcy in the Jacobite Peerage, although theoretically extant, is not recognised by the Lyon Office.

The Hay Baronetcy, of Smithfield and Haystoun in the County of Peebles, was created in the Baronetage of Nova Scotia on 20 July 1635 for James Hay, Esquire of the Body to King James VI, with remainder to his heirs male whatsoever. Along with the baronetcy he was granted 16,000 acres (65 km^{2}) of land in Nova Scotia. The title became dormant on the death of the third Baronet in 1683. In 1762 James Hay claimed and assumed the baronetcy as the great-great-grandson John Hay, younger brother of the grandfather of the first Baronet. A jury assembled at Perth in 1805 decided his claim was valid and in 1806 he matriculated arms as a Baronet in the Lyon Office. The sixth Baronet sat as Member of Parliament for Peeblesshire. The seventh Baronet was Member of Parliament for Linlithgow Burghs. The title became dormant on the death of the eleventh Baronet in 1966. The presumed heir to the baronetcy is the Marquess of Tweeddale as a descendant of John Hay, 3rd Lord Hay of Yester, great-great-uncle of the first Baronet.

The Hay Baronetcy, of Park in the County of Wigtown, was created in the Baronetage of Nova Scotia on 25 August 1663 for Thomas Hay. The seventh Baronet married Sarah, daughter of John Cossins by his wife the Hon. Elizabeth Susannah, daughter of George Thicknesse, 19th Baron Audley. Consequently, his descendants are also in remainder to the barony of Audley.

The Hay Baronetcy, of Linplum in the County of Haddington, was created in the Baronetage of Nova Scotia on 26 March 1667 for James Hay, son of the Hon. William Hay, who was son of the 8th Lord Hay of Yester and brother of the 1st Earl of Tweeddale. The title became extinct on the death of the second Baronet in 1751.

The Hay Baronetcy, of Alderston, was created in the Baronetage of Nova Scotia on 22 February 1703 for John Hay, with remainder to heirs male forever. He was a member of the same family as the Hay Baronets of Smithfield and Haystoun and the Marquesses of Tweeddale. The third and fourth Baronets used the surname of Hay-Makdougall. The ninth Baronet never proved his succession or used the title. Two other members of the family may also be mentioned. Thomas Hay, grandfather of the fifth Baronet, was a Lord of Session under the judicial title of Lord Huntingdon. The younger brother of Thomas Hay, John Hay of Restalrig, joined Prince Charles Edward Stuart in the Jacobite rising of 1745. He was by "King Charles III" created a knight and baronet of Nova Scotia in the Jacobite Peerage with remainder to heirs male; this title merged with the 1703 creation in 1825. Woulfe Hay, grandson of Captain John Hay, half-brother of the fifth Baronet, was a Major-General in the British Army.

== Hay baronets, of Smithfield and Haystoun (1635) ==
Haystoun is an estate around 2 km SSE of Peebles. It is of vernacular form standing on three sides of a courtyard and dating from around 1500 being built by the Elphinstone family under the name of Henderstoun. In 1635 the property was bought by Andrew Hay WS of the Hays of Smithfield who renamed it Haystoun in 1643. From around 1760 the house ceased to be the principal family residence and became a house occupied by the estate factor. The 10th baronet, Duncan Hay, occupied the house from 1920 but wholly remodelled the interior at that point.

Arms of the Baronet Hay of Smithfield and Haystoun

- Sir James Hay, 1st Baronet (died 1654)
- Sir John Hay, 2nd Baronet (died c. 1659)
- Sir James Hay, 3rd Baronet (1652 – c. 1683) (dormant)
- Sir James Hay, 4th Baronet (died 1810) (claimed title 1805)
- Sir John Hay, 5th Baronet (1755–1830)
- Sir John Hay, 6th Baronet (1788–1838)
- Sir Adam Hay, 7th Baronet (1795–1867)
- Sir Robert Hay, 8th Baronet (1825–1885)
- Sir John Adam Hay, 9th Baronet (1854–1895)
- Sir Duncan Edwyn Hay, 10th Baronet (1882–1965)
- Sir Bache McEvers Athole Hay, 11th Baronet (1892–1966) (dormant)

== Hay baronets, of Park (1663) ==
Arms of the Baronet Hay of Park

- Sir Thomas Hay, 1st Baronet (died c. 1680)
- Sir Charles Hay, 2nd Baronet (1662–1737)
- Sir Thomas Hay, 3rd Baronet (c. 1730–1777)
- Sir Thomas Hay, 4th Baronet (died 1794)
- Sir James Hay, 5th Baronet (c. 1775–1794)
- Sir William Hay, 6th Baronet (1793–1801)
- Sir John Hay, 7th Baronet (1799–1862)
- Sir Arthur Graham Hay, 8th Baronet (1839–1889)
- Sir Lewis John Erroll Hay, 9th Baronet (1866–1923)
- Sir Arthur Thomas Erroll Hay, ISO, 10th Baronet (1909–1993)
- Sir John Erroll Audley Hay, 11th Baronet (1935–2020)

== Hay baronets, of Linplum (1667) ==
Arms of the Baronet Hay of Linplum

- Sir James Hay, 1st Baronet (died 1704)
- Sir Robert Hay, 2nd Baronet (c. 1673–1751)

== Hay baronets, of Alderston (1703) ==
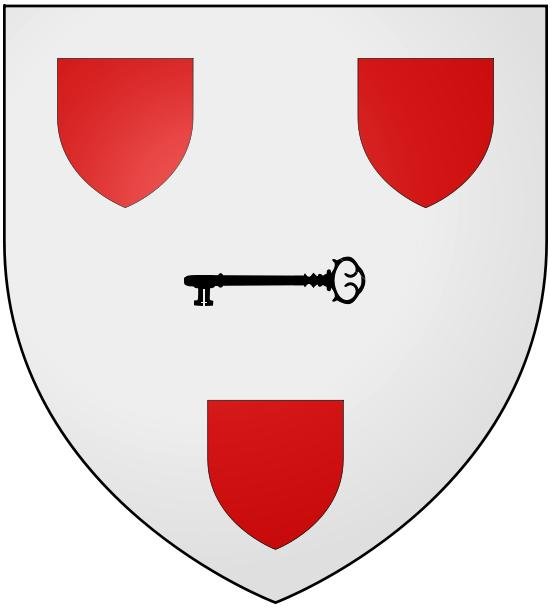
Arms of the Baronet Hay of Alderston

- Sir John Hay, 1st Baronet (died 1706)
- Sir Thomas Hay, 2nd Baronet (died 1769)
- Sir George Hay-Makdougall, 3rd Baronet (died 1777)
- Sir Henry Hay-Makdougall, 4th Baronet (c. 1750–1825)
- Sir Thomas Hay, 5th Baronet (died 1832)
- Sir James Douglas Hamilton Hay, 6th Baronet (1800–1873)
- Sir Hector Maclean Hay, 7th Baronet (1821–1916)
- Sir William Henry Hay, 8th Baronet (1867–1927)
- (Sir) Edward Hamilton Hay, 9th Baronet (1870–1936)
- Sir Frederick Baden-Powell Hay, 10th Baronet (1900–1985), grocer, of Northcote, Melbourne, son of Frederick Howard Hay (died 1934), younger brother of Sir William Henry Hay, 8th Baronet.
- Sir Ronald Nelson Hay, 11th Baronet (1910–1988), younger brother of Sir Frederick Baden-Powell Hay, 10th Baronet.
- Sir Ronald Frederick Hamilton Hay, 12th Baronet (born 1941)

== Hay Baronets, of Restalrig (in the Jacobite Peerage) (1766) ==
- Sir John Hay, 1st Baronet (died 1784)
- Sir Alexander Hay, 2nd Baronet (died 1791)
- Sir Thomas Hay, 3rd Baronet (died 1832) (see above)
- Sir James Douglas Hamilton Hay, 4th Baronet (1800–1873)
- Sir Hector Maclean Hay, 5th Baronet (1821–1916)
- Sir William Henry Hay, 6th Baronet (1867–1927)
- Sir Edward Hamilton Hay, 7th Baronet (1870–1936)
- Sir Frederick Baden-Powell Hay, 8th Baronet (1900–1985)
- Sir Ronald Nelson Hay, 9th Baronet (1910–1988)
- Sir Ronald Frederick Hamilton Hay, 10th Baronet (born 1941)

== See also ==
- Thomas Hay, Lord Huntingdon
- Clan Hay
- Marquess of Tweeddale
- Dalrymple-Hay baronets
- Moncreiffe baronets, title now held by the Chief of Clan Hay
- Baron Audley
