= Skene House =

House in Aberdeenshire, Scotland

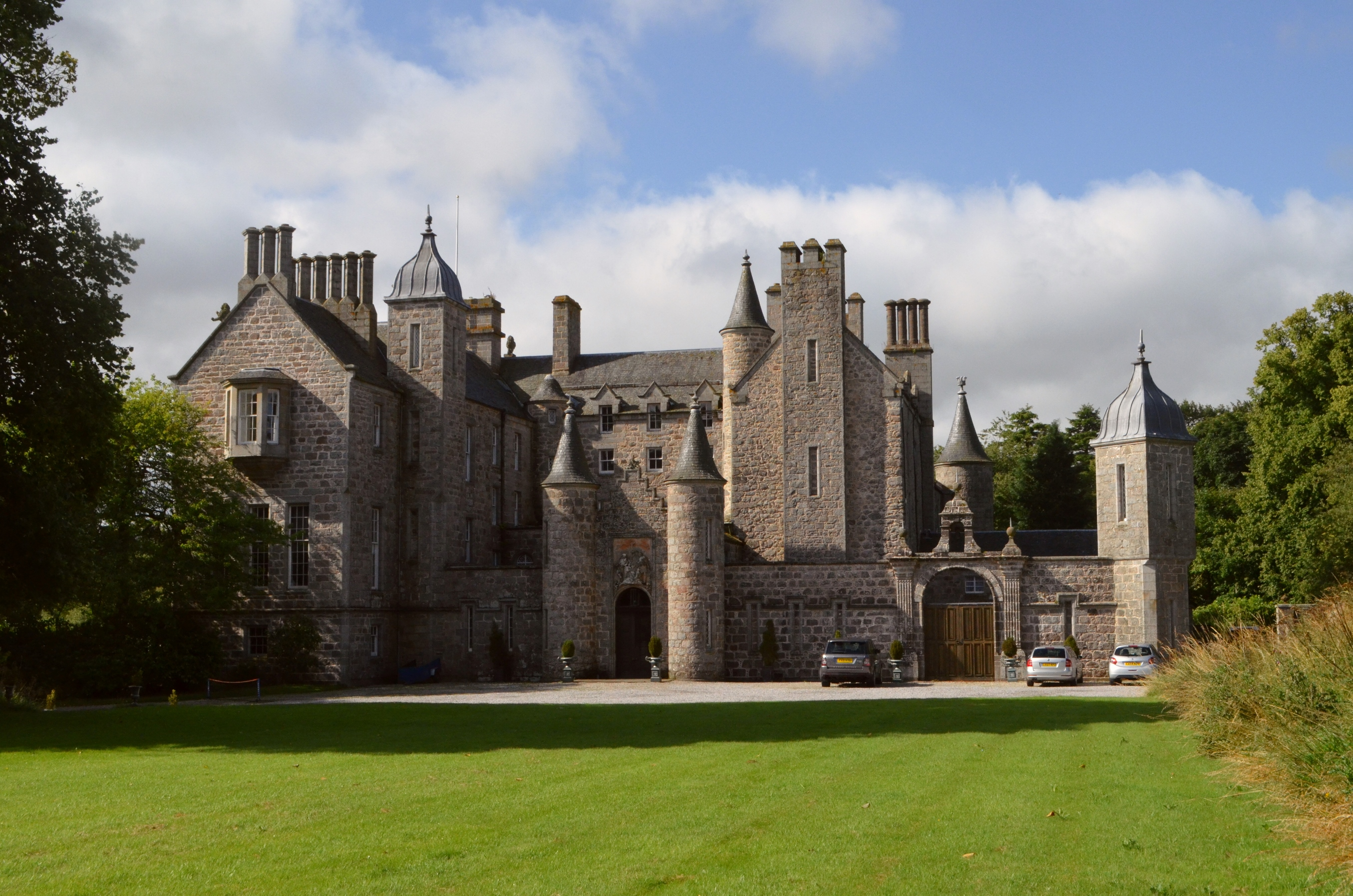
- Skene House, Aberdeenshire
- Interactive map of the Skene House area

General information
- Type: Country house
- Architectural style: Scots Baronial
- Location: Skene, Aberdeenshire, Scotland
- Coordinates: 57.1780°N 2.3855°W

Listed Building – Category A
- Official name: Skene House, Including Terrace And Garden Ornaments
- Designated: 16 April 1971
- Reference no.: LB16530

Listed Building – Category B
- Official name: Skene House, Stableblock
- Designated: 16 April 1971
- Reference no.: LB16500

Listed Building – Category B
- Official name: Skene House, Walled Garden
- Designated: 16 April 1971
- Reference no.: LB16502

Listed Building – Category B
- Official name: Skene House Cottage To West Of Stables Block
- Designated: 16 April 1971
- Reference no.: LB16501

Skene House is a historic country house near the village of Skene, Aberdeenshire in Scotland. The building incorporates a medieval tower house and subsequent additions, evolving into a substantial mansion in the Scottish Baronial style. It is protected as a Category A listed building for its architectural and historical significance.

== History ==
The lands of Skene were erected into a barony in the early 14th century by King Robert I (Robert the Bruce). A fortified tower house was established on the site by the Skene family, believed to be one of the earliest stone‑and‑lime structures in the historic district of Mar. The original tower later formed part of the north wing of the modern house.

In 1680 the medieval tower was remodelled with roofing and floors, and around 1745 a south wing was added. Between 1847 and 1850, the house acquired its present form with extensive expansion in the Scots Baronial style for the Earl of Fife; the design work at that time is associated with the noted 19th‑century architect Archibald Simpson.

In the early 20th century the house was purchased by the Hamilton family, who retained ownership until the late 20th century, after which it passed into private ownership.

== Architecture ==
Skene House stands on elevated ground near the settlement of Lyne of Skene. The structure combines masonry from the medieval tower with later extensions, resulting in a building of three to four storeys in places. The exterior displays characteristic Scots Baronial details, with rubble stone walls and ashlar dressings evident in the 19th‑century additions. Historic garden elements, such as ornate fountains and sculptural features, survive on parts of the estate.

== Estate and ancillary structures ==
The wider estate associated with Skene House included features such as a walled garden with twin gazebos and sheds; these ancillary elements are recorded on the Buildings at Risk Register for Scotland, reflecting their historic interest and conservation status.
