= Sir John Hay, 6th Baronet =

British baronet and politician

The Right Honourable Sir John Hay, Bt FRSE FSA

Member of Parliament for Peeblesshire
- In office 1831–1837
- Preceded by: Sir George Montgomery, Bt
- Succeeded by: William Forbes Mackenzie

Personal details
- Born: 3 August 1788
- Died: 1 November 1838 (aged 50)
- Spouse: Ann Preston (m. 1821; died 1838)
- Relations: Sir Adam Hay, 7th Baronet (brother)
- Parent(s): Sir John Hay, 5th Baronet; Hon. Mary Elizabeth Forbes

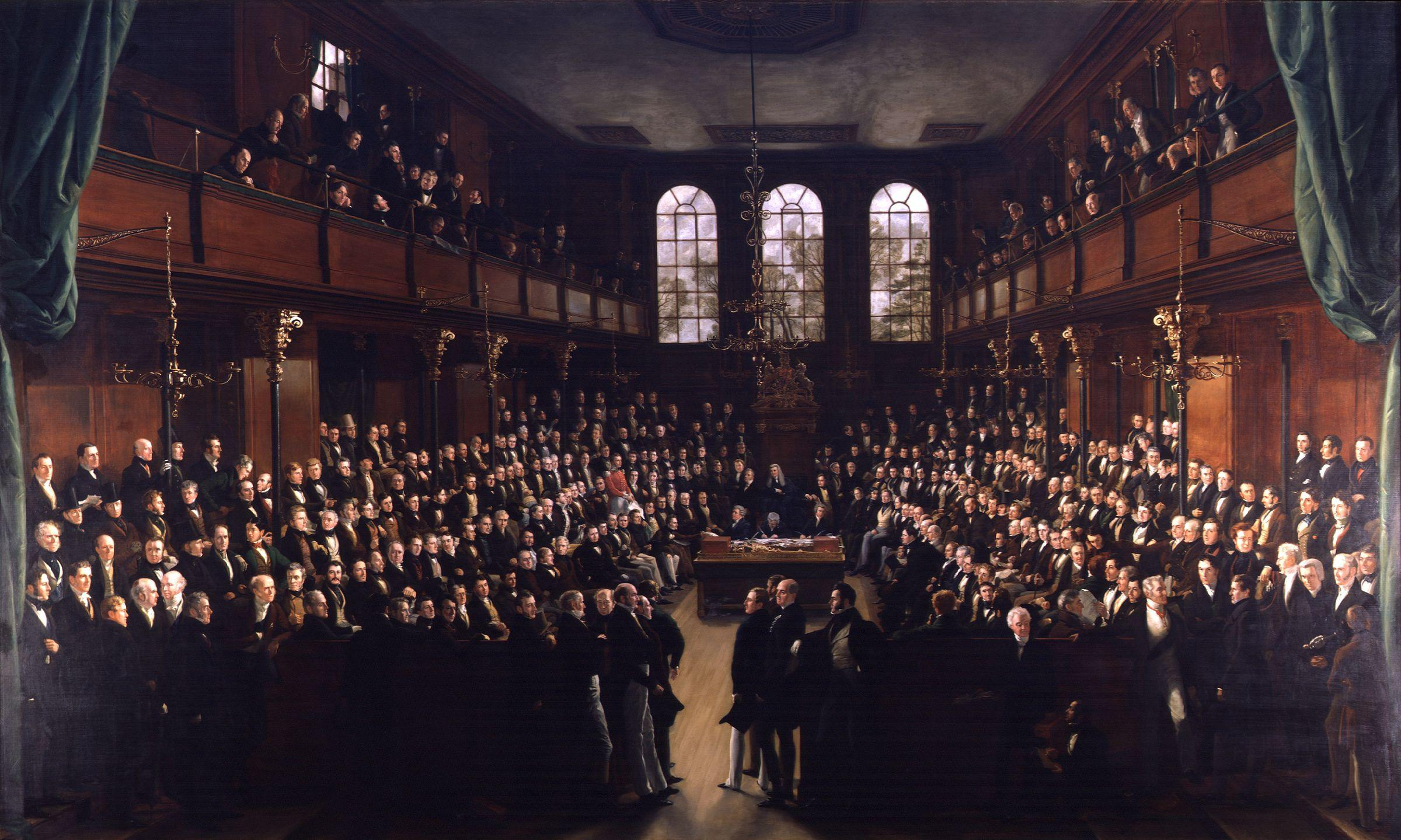
House of Commons, 1833

Sir John Hay, 6th Baronet of Smithfield and Haystoun FRSE FSA (3 August 1788 – 1 November 1838) was a British baronet and politician.

== Early life ==
He was the eldest surviving son of Sir John Hay, 5th Baronet of Smithfield and Haystoun FRSE, banker and landowner, and the Hon. Mary Elizabeth Forbes. His brother-in-law was the banker, George Forbes FRSE.

== Career ==
He trained as an advocate and passed the Scottish bar in 1811. In 1820 he was elected a Fellow of the Royal Society of Edinburgh his proposer being George Forbes.

He sat as a Member of Parliament for Peeblesshire from 1831 to 1837.

== Personal life ==
In 1821 he married Ann Preston. They had no children.

Upon his death on 1 November 1838, he was succeeded in the baronetcy by his younger brother, Adam. He is buried at the Cross Kirk, Peebles in the enclosed area to the south.

Parliament of the United Kingdom
Preceded by Sir George Montgomery, Bt	Member of Parliament for Peeblesshire; 1831–1837	Succeeded by William Forbes Mackenzie
Baronetage of Nova Scotia
Preceded by John Hay	Baronet (of Smithfield and Haystoun); 1830–1838	Succeeded by Adam Hay
