= Elrick =

Village in Aberdeenshire, Scotland

Coordinates: 57.14814°N 2.29416°W

Elrick Scottish Gaelic: An Eilreig
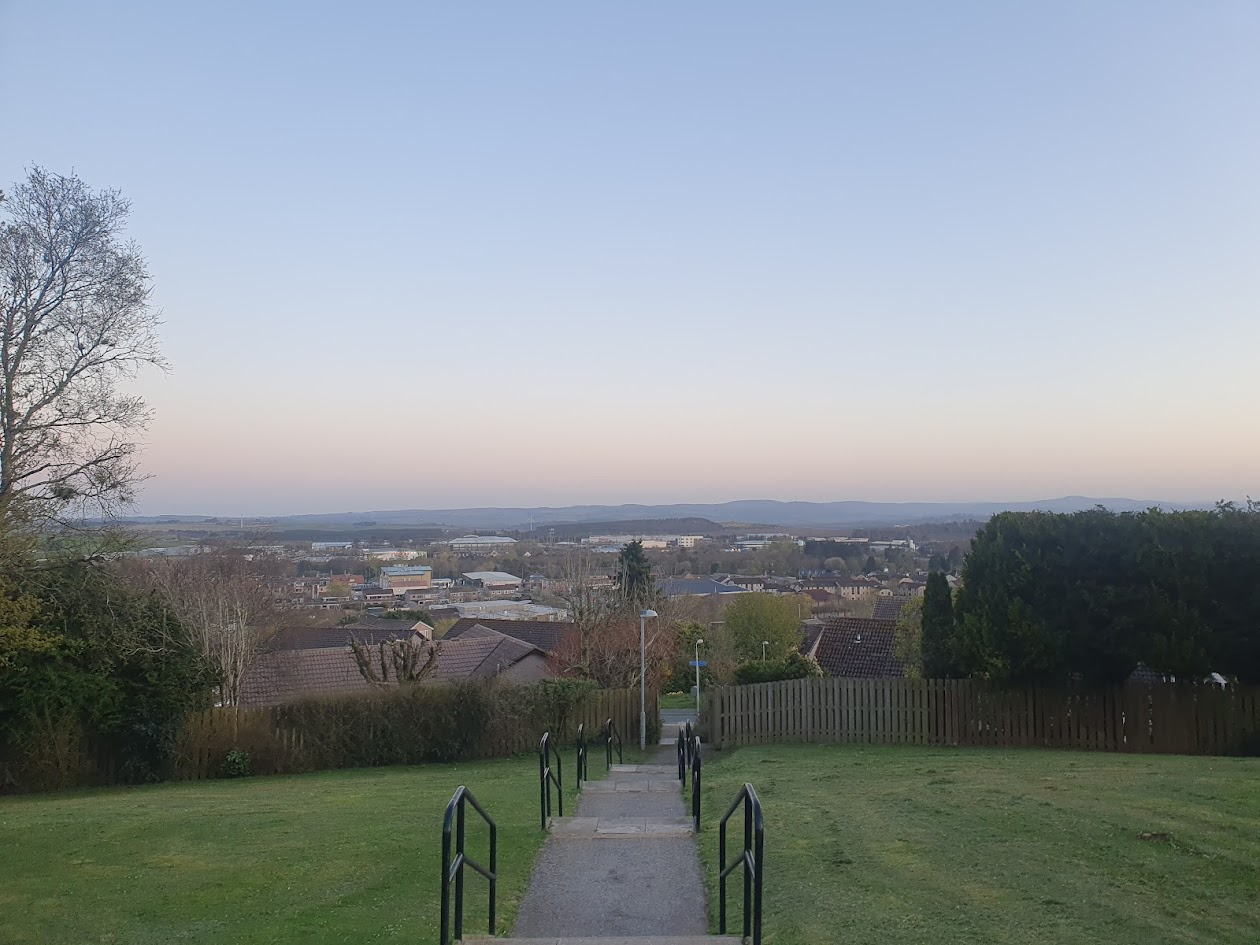
- Parts of the former village of Elrick from a vantage point in Westhill
- Interactive map of Elrick

Elrick (Scottish Gaelic: An Eilreig) is a small village on the A944 road 7 1/2 miles (12.1 km) west of the city of Aberdeen, Scotland. The name derives from a Gaelic word meaning a place where deer were driven for hunting. Elrick is also a common surname in the local area.

Currently, Stagecoach Buses operates services 5 & 6A to & from the city via Queens Road. Also, the service 218 from Alford to Aberdeen. These buses all pass through the village.

The village of Elrick was incorporated in the Town of Westhill. During the development of Westhill throughout the latter half of the twentieth century the city incorporated the villages of Elrick and Carnie to become a wider part of the town.

There are still separate speeds and entry signs located when entering the area where the village used to be.

== History ==
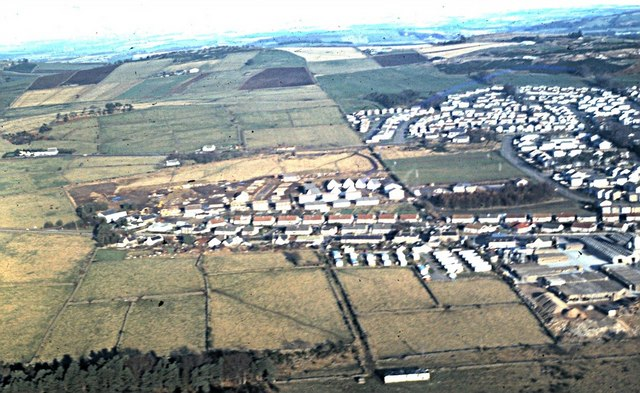
Aerial image of Elrick in 1981

The village of Elrick is not mentioned before 1800 and Jim Fiddes argues that this means that the village did not exist before this period and that it was a small area located between the villages of Carnie and Leddach. There is a debate among locals towards the proper spelling of the name Elrick with the still-signposted Earlick Cottages being right beside the Spar garage. The debate over the name of the town comes from the period during the 19th Century when the Earlick Stone and Earlick Butts were mentioned in the Leddach Disposition. However, by the 1861 United Kingdom census both, Earlick and Elrick were used for various settlements in the area and it seems to be interchangeable.

Throughout the second half of the 19th century Elrick grew to become one of the main villages in the area alongside, Kirkton of Skene, Broadstraik and Carnie. Elrick would become a working village with a carpenter and blacksmiths becoming the main buildings in the area. In 2017, a memorial was placed in the centre of what was the village of Elrick commemorating the relation that the old village of Elrick had toward horses and a certain group of Clydesdales that were situated there.
