= John Stirling of Kippendavie =

Scottish landowner (1742–1816)

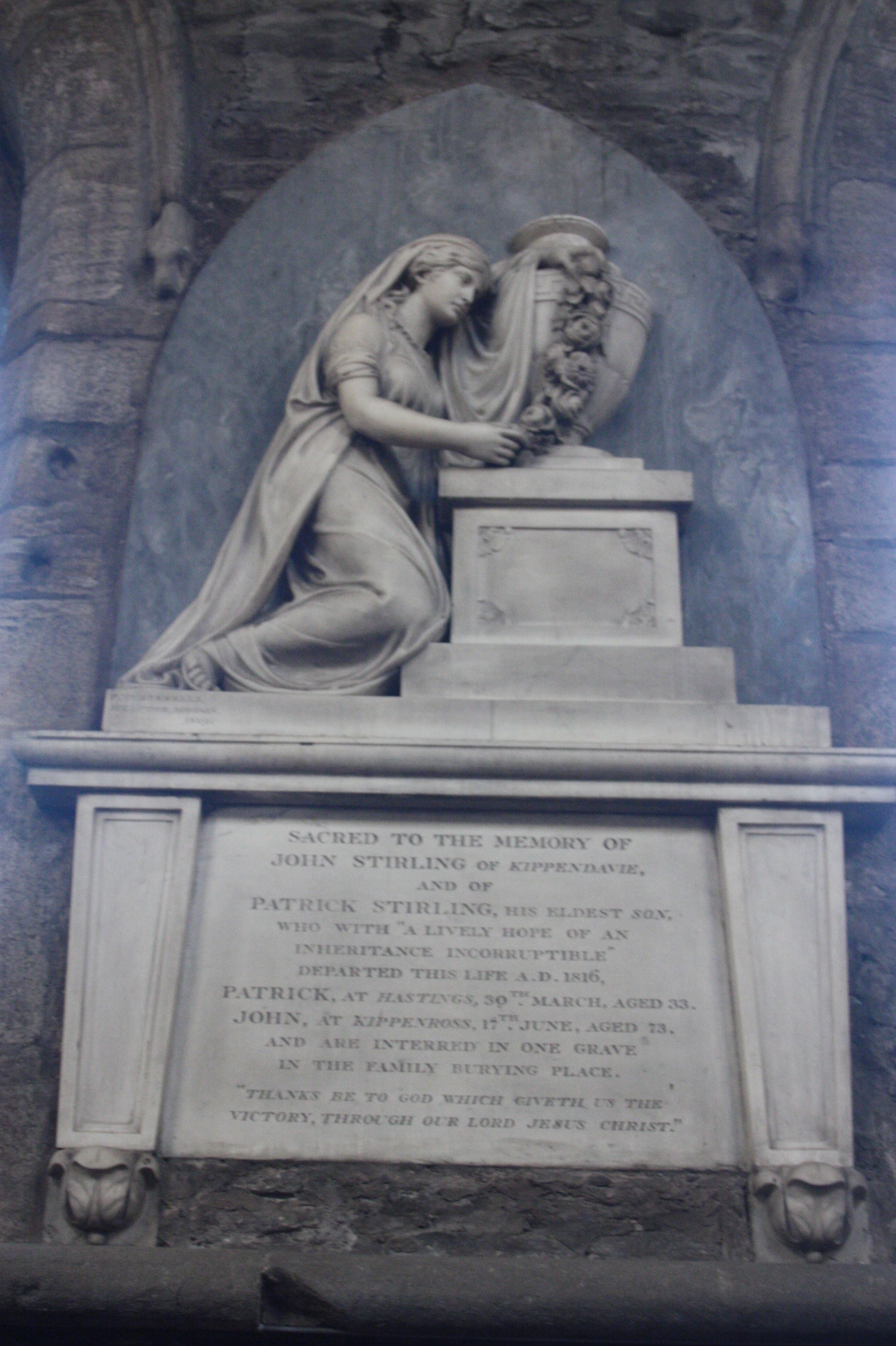
The grave of John Stirling of Kippendavie (by Turnerelli), Dunblane Cathedral

John Stirling of Kippendavie (1742–1816) was an 18th/19th century Scottish landowner.

== Life ==
He was born on 22 December 1742, the second son of Patrick Stirling 4th laird of Kippendavie (1704-1745), from a family of renowned Jacobite sympathisers, and his wife Margaret Douglas.

In 1776, Stirling inherited the estate of Kippendavie, north-east of Dunblane, following the death of his elder brother, Patrick Stirling. John then become the 6th Laird of Kippendavie. Around 1800, he also acquired the estate of Kippenross, south-east of Dunblane. On his brother's death, he also inherited the Keir plantation on Jamaica in the West Indies.

He died on 7 June 1816 at aged 73. He was buried in the north aisle of Dunblane Cathedral. A monument to his memory by Peter Turnerelli lies high on the north wall. He left a fortune of over £146,000.

== Family ==
In April 1781, he was married to Mary Graham, daughter of William Graham of Airth and they had at least 13 children.

His sons were tutored by Rev James Thomson.

His daughter Eliza Christian Stirling married Sir William John Milliken-Napier, 8th Baronet.

He was father to Jane Stirling.

He appears to be either cousin or in-law to the Stirlings of Keir (as he inherited much of their land).

== Artistic recognition ==
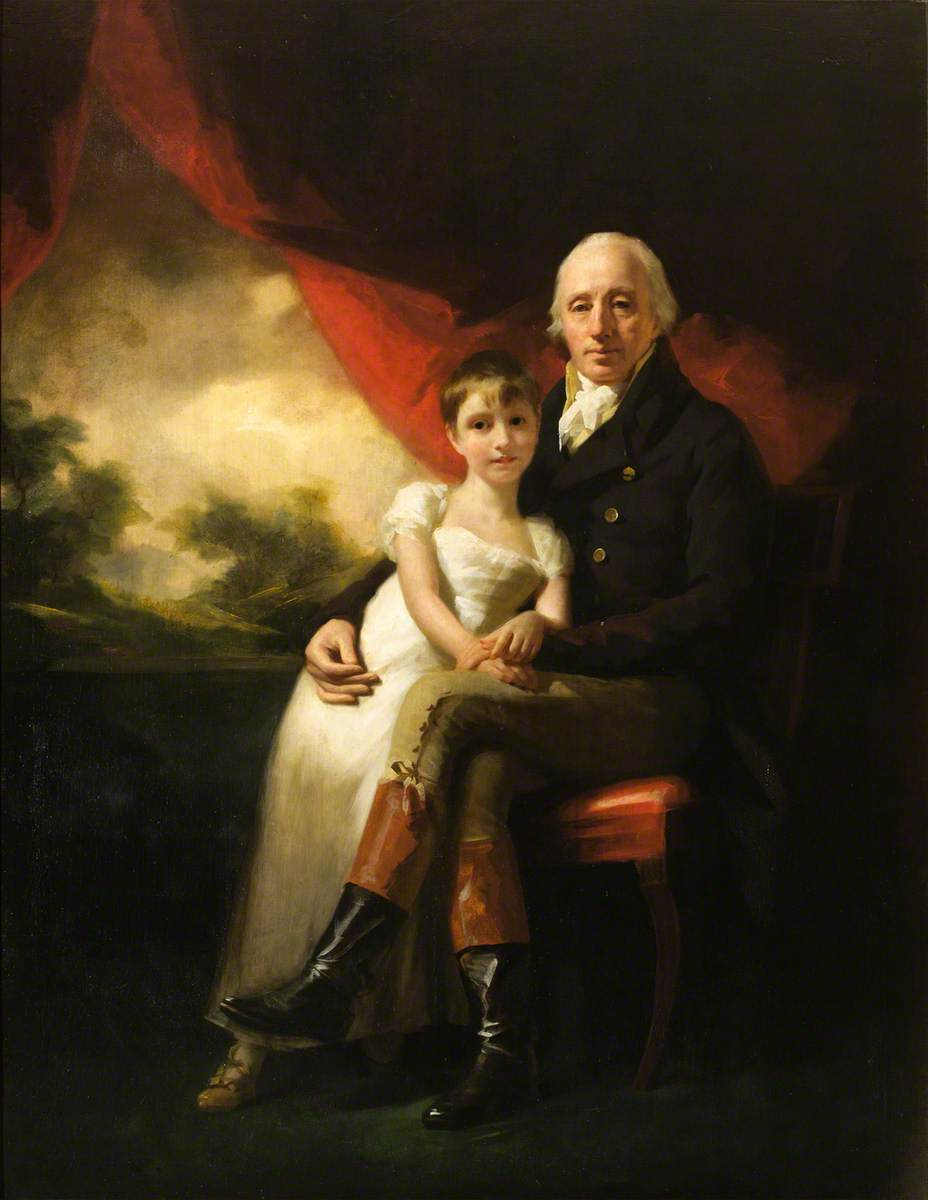
Jane Stirling with her father, John Stirling of Kippendavie

His portrait with his youngest daughter, Jane Stirling, by Sir Henry Raeburn, hangs at Fyvie Castle.
