= John Adlercron =

Lieutenant-General John Adlercron
- Portrait by James Latham
- Born: c. 1703; Dublin, Ireland
- Died: 31 July 1766 (aged 62–63); Blackrock, Dublin
- Military career
- Allegiance: Great Britain
- Branch: British Army
- Service years: –1766
- Rank: Lieutenant-general
- Commands: 39th Regiment of Foot

Lieutenant-General John Adlercron (c. 1703 – 31 July 1766) was a British Army officer.

== Life ==
John Adlercron was born in Ireland in c. 1703 into a Huguenot family who had settled in Dublin at the end of the 17th century. He joined the British Army at some point in his life and in 1752 became colonel of the 39th Regiment of Foot. Two years later Adlercron went to India with his regiment to protect the interests of the East India Company. He became Commander-in-Chief, East Indies in 1753 following his arrival in the region. On 16 May 1758 Adlercron was promoted to major general and on 18 December 1760 was promoted again to lieutenant-general. He returned to Ireland and on 31 July 1766 died of apoplexy at his home at Blackrock, Dublin.

Military offices
Preceded by Stringer Lawrence	Commander-in-Chief, East Indies; 1754	Succeeded by Robert Clive
