= James Wolfe Murray, Lord Cringletie =

Scottish lawyer

The Hon. James Wolfe Murray, Lord Cringletie (5 January 1759–29 May 1836) was a Scottish lawyer and a Senator of the College of Justice.

== Life ==
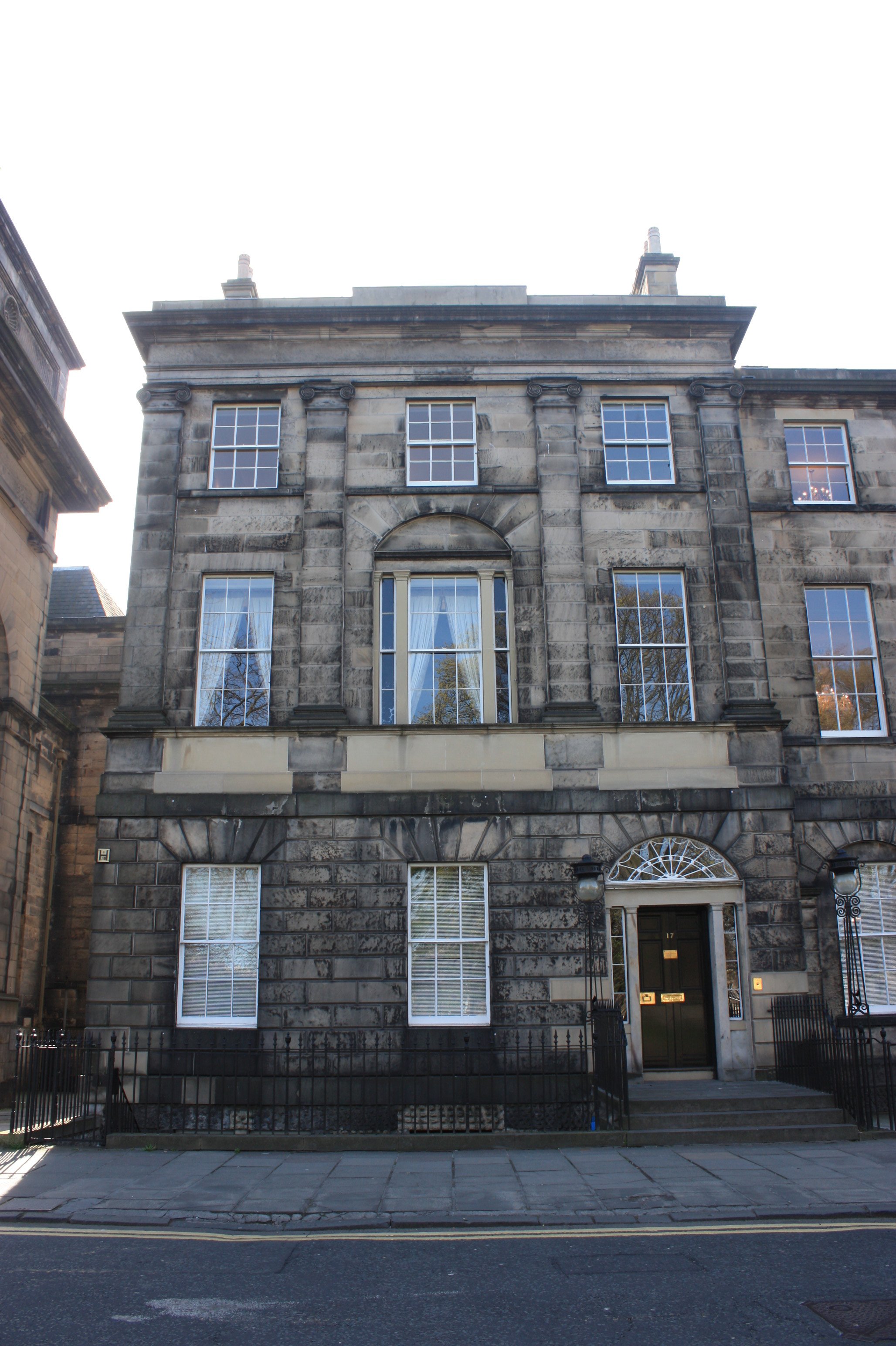
17 Charlotte Square, Edinburgh

Murray was born in Louisbourg, Cape Breton Island in Nova Scotia on 5 January 1759 the son of Marion (Mary) Anne Stewart and Lieutenant Colonel Alexander Murray of Cringletie (1719-1762). His father served with General Wolfe at Quebec, and named James after him in his honour.

He was educated at the High School in Edinburgh then studied law at the University of Edinburgh.

In 1816 he was appointed a Lord of Session with the title Lord Cringletie, named after his country seat, Cringletie House in Peeblesshire (rebuilt in 1861 by his son). His position filled the place of Allan Maconochie, Lord Meadowbank, who had died. His Edinburgh address was at 17 Charlotte Square.

He died in Edinburgh on 29 May 1836, and is buried in Greyfriars Kirkyard. The grave lies against the original western wall, backing onto the western extension.

== Family ==
In April 1807 he married Isabella Katherine Strange (1785-1847). Their 11 children included Brigadier General James Wolfe Murray (1814-1890), father of Lieutenant General James Wolfe Murray, and Major General Thomas Andrew Lumsden Murray.
