= Skene, Aberdeenshire =

Environs of two villages

Kirkton of Skene
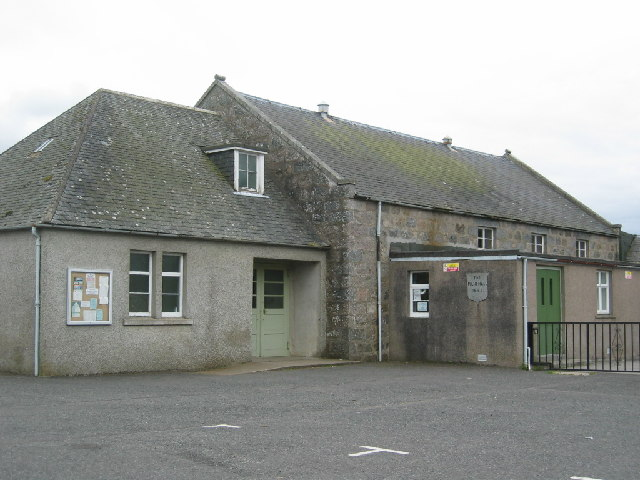
- Milne Hall, Kirkton of Skene's village hall
- Interactive map of Kirkton of Skene
- Coordinates: 57°09′45″N 2°19′49″W

Skene (Gaelic: Sgainn) is a small farming community in North East Scotland approximately 6 miles (9.7 km) west of Aberdeen. The two traditional villages are Kirkton of Skene and Lyne of Skene. As the name suggests, Kirkton is the location of Skene Parish Church. Lyne means 'glade' or 'enclosure'.

Kirkton of Skene consists of a main road that runs through its centre that branches off into a small warren of 5 or so streets that service just under 100 houses, a pub - The Red Star Inn, a big playpark, a village hall, the church, and "Bothy 57" the local cafe.

The main concentration of population in the area is further east at the newer settlements of Westhill and Elrick, both of which are built around ancient hamlets. Nearby are the Loch of Skene and Skene House.

In the 16th and 17th centuries, the local Laird, Alexander Skene, was known as the "Wizard of Skene" and is the subject of legend and folklore in the local area. He is buried in Skene Churchyard.
