= Napier baronets of Luton Hoo (1611) =

Escutcheon of the Napier baronets of Luton Hoo

The Napier baronetcy, of Luton Hoo in the County of Bedford, was created in the Baronetage of England on 24 September 1611 for Robert Napier, a Turkey merchant and younger brother of Richard Napier. The title became extinct on the death of the unmarried 6th Baronet in 1748.

== Napier baronets, of Luton Hoo (1611) ==
- Sir Robert Napier, 1st Baronet (1560–1637)
- Sir Robert Napier, 2nd Baronet (c. 1603–1661)
- Sir Robert Napier, 3rd Baronet (died 1675)
- Sir John Napier, 4th Baronet (1636–1711)
- Sir Theophilus Napier, 5th Baronet (1672–1719)
- Sir John Napier, 6th Baronet (died 1748)

== Notes ==
Baronetage of England
Preceded by Lee Baronets	Napier Baronets; 24 September 1611	Succeeded by Bayning Baronets
