= Simon Leach =

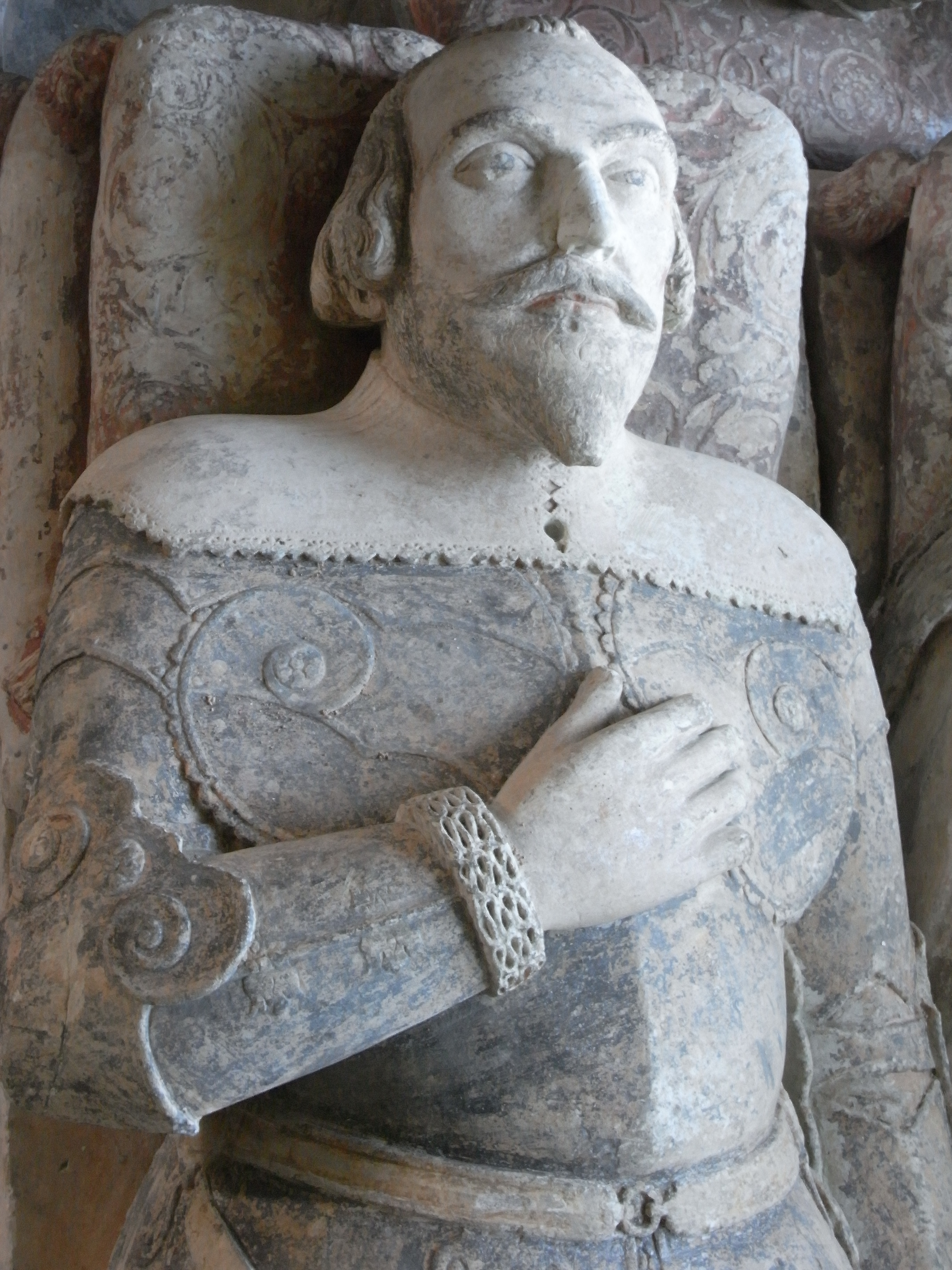
Sir Simon Leach (1567–1638), detail of his effigy in St Bartholomew's Church, Cadeleigh

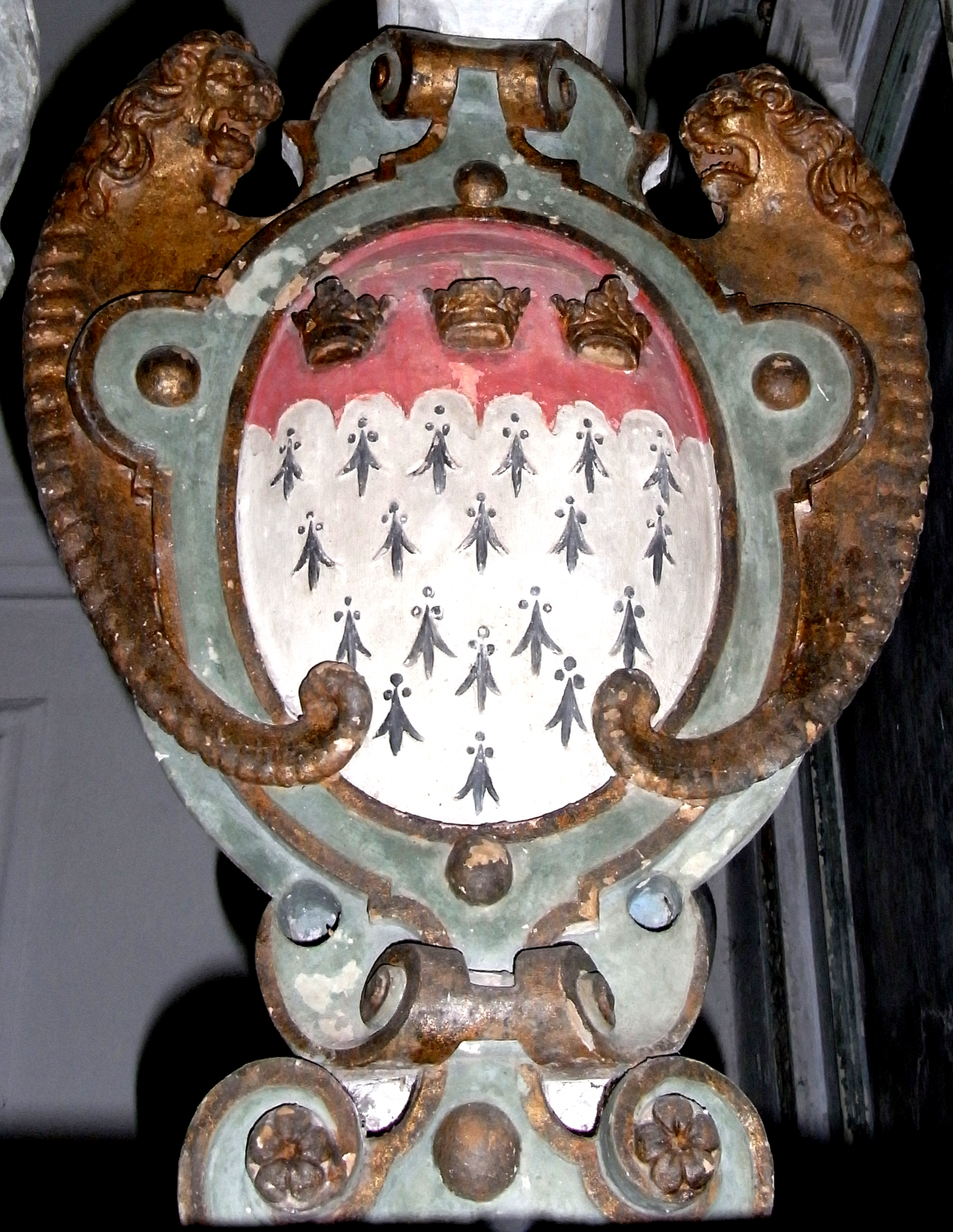
Arms of Leach: Ermine, on a chief engrailed gules three ducal coronets or. Detail from top of monument to Sir Simon Leach

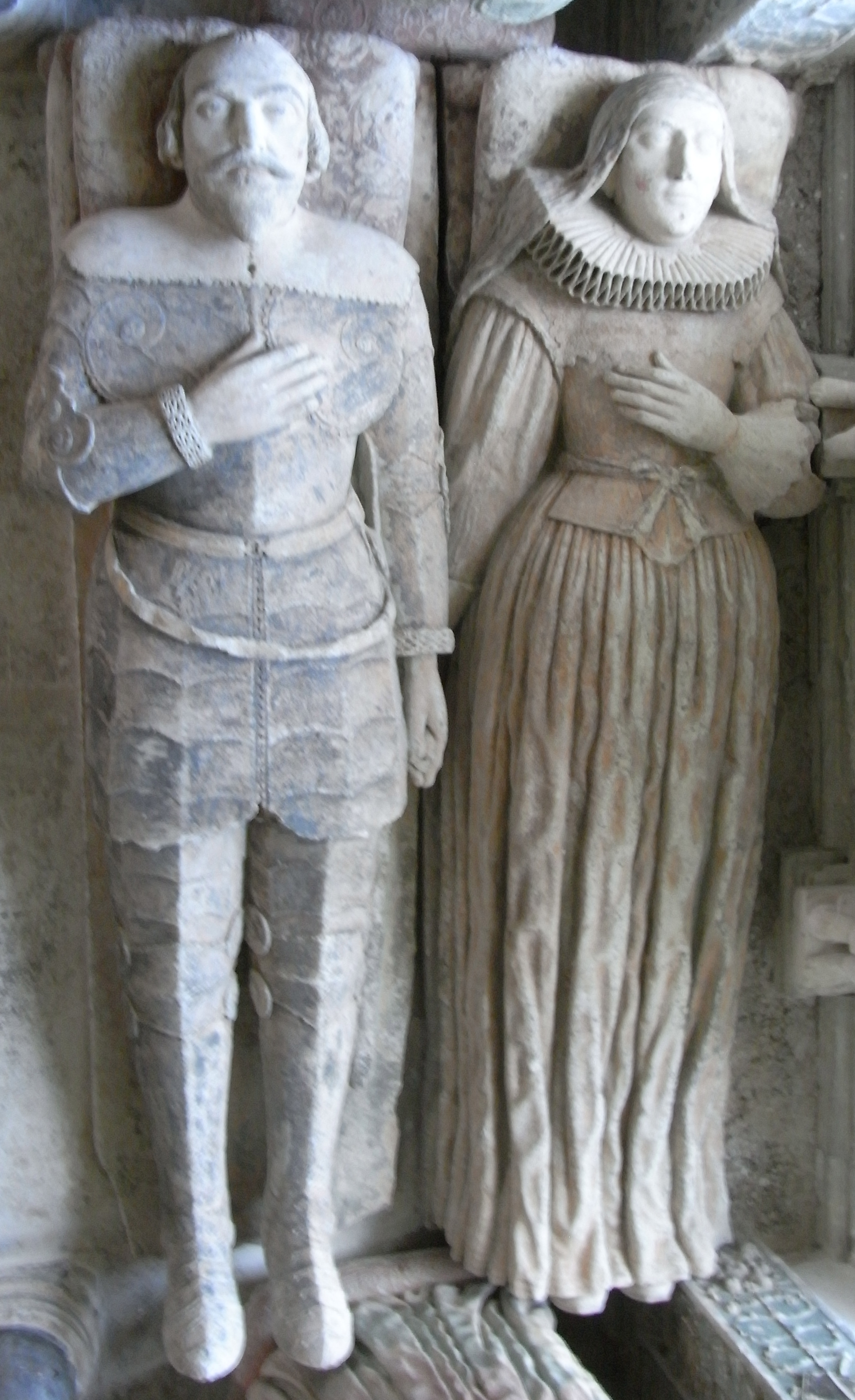
Effigies of Leach and his second wife Katherine Turbervile. Detail from his monument in St Bartholomew's Church, Cadeleigh

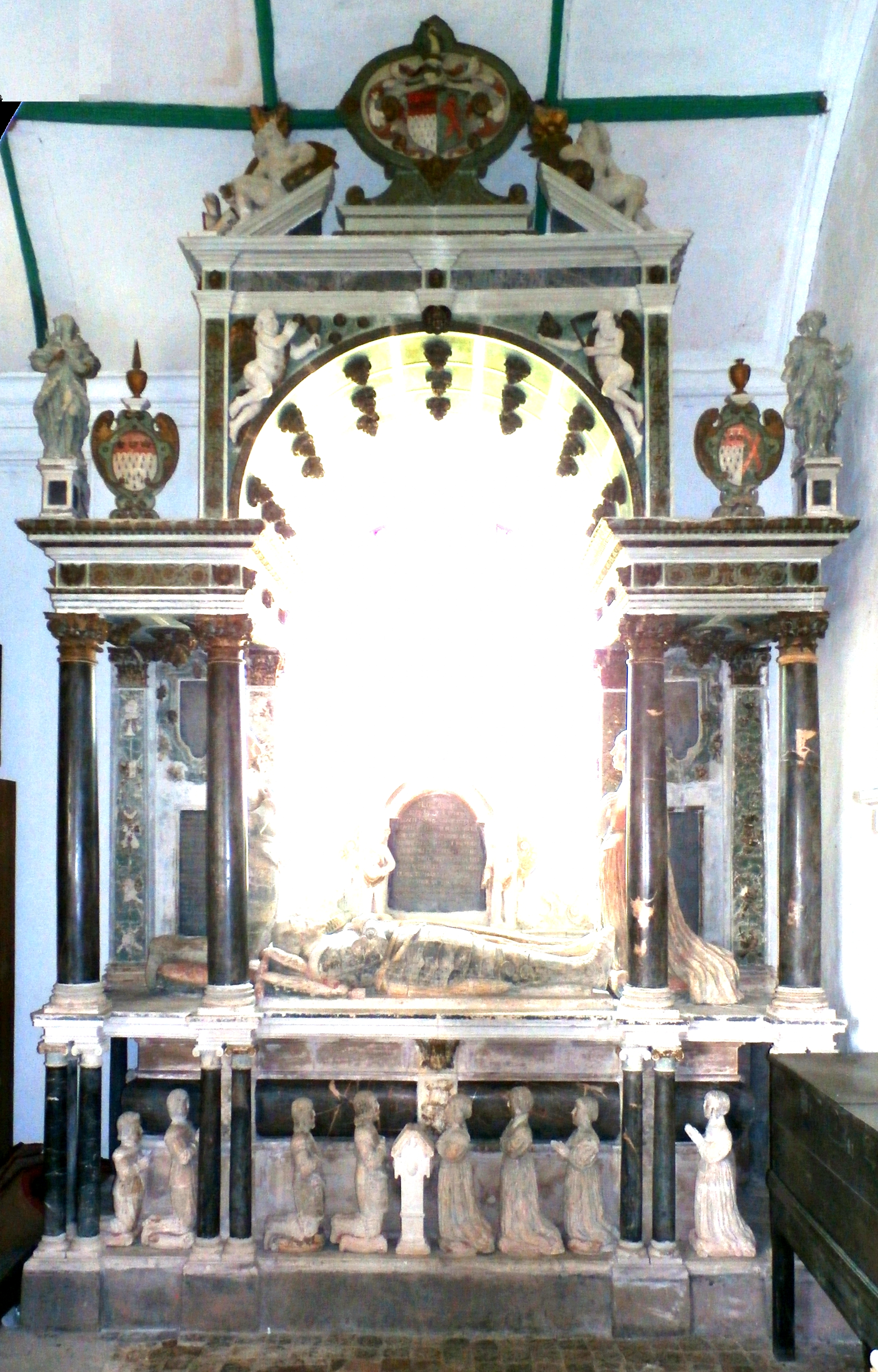
Monument to Sir Simon Leach (1567–1638), St Bartholomew's Church, Cadeleigh; the largest of its type in any Devon parish church.

Sir Simon Leach (1567–1638) of the parish of All Hallows, Goldsmith Street, Exeter and of Cadeleigh, Devon, was Sheriff of Devon in 1624. His surviving monument in St Bartholomew's Church, Cadeleigh is the largest of its type in any Devon parish church.

== Origins ==
He was a son of Simon Leach (died 1579) of Crediton in Devon, a blacksmith, by his wife Elizabeth Rowe, daughter of John Rowe of Crediton. The arms of Leach of Cadeleigh (Ermine, on a chief indented gules three ducal coronets or) are those of the ancient Leche family of Carden, near Chester, which estate held by the family until the late 20th century had been acquired during the reign of King Henry IV (1399–1413) by John Leche (descended from the family of Leche of Chatsworth in Derbyshire) on his marriage to Lucy Cawarden, heiress of Carden.

== Career ==
He served as Sheriff of Devon in 1624 He was knighted by King Charles I at Ford on 26 September 1625.

== Landholdings ==
- Cadeleigh, which manor he purchased in about 1600 from Sir John Horton, and where he made his seat at Cadeleigh Court.
- Spencer Combe, near Crediton, which he purchased from Bevil Prideaux.

== Marriages and children ==
Leach married twice. His first marriage was in 1597 to Elizabeth Borrough (died 1599), daughter of Walter Borrough of Exeter. By Elizabeth he had two sons: Simon (born 1598), who died young, and Sir Walter Leach (1599 – before 1637), second son and heir apparent, who predeceased his father. Walter was knighted by King Charles I at the Palace of Whitehall on 3 December 1626. In 1626 he married Sara Napier, a daughter of Sir Robert Napier, 1st Baronet (1560–1637), of Luton Hoo in Bedfordshire.

Leach's second wife was Katherine Turbervile (died before 1637), the eldest daughter of Nicholas Turbervile of Crediton by his wife Charity Prideaux, a daughter of Richard Prideaux (died 1603) of Thuborough, Sutcombe, Devon. By Katherine he had seven further children:

- Simon (born 1601), third son. He died childless.
- George (1602-pre-1637), fourth son, whose wife, Margaret, survived him and remarried to Bevil Prideaux (a grandson of Richard Prideaux (died 1603) of Thuborough) of Spencer Combe near Crediton. Bevil Prideaux sold Spencer Combe to Sir Simon Leach (died 1638).
- Nicholas (died 1646), fifth son, of Newton St Petrock, who married Grace Mallock, daughter of Roger Mallock of Exeter.
- Katherine, who married as her second husband Thomas Giffard (1607–1648) of Halsbury, Parkham, Devon.
- Elizabeth, Rebecka, and Anne.

== Death and monument ==
Leach was buried in Cadeleigh Church, where his monument survives. It shows recumbent effigies of himself and his second wife Katherine Turbervile, with kneeling effigies of his eldest son Sir Walter Leach at their heads and of Sir Walter's wife Sara Napier at their feet. Below are two groups of kneeling children, to the left four sons and to the right four daughters, each group separated by a prie-dieu. On top of the monument are shown the arms of Leach (left), of Leach impaling Turbervile (centre) and of leach impaling Napier (right).

The inscription on the monument reads

"Heere lye the bodyes of Sr Symon Leach Knight son of Symon Leach of Crediton Blacke smith and of ye Lady Catherin Leach his wife daughter of Nicholas Tubervill of Crediton Esquire

whose true affection in religious wedlocke caused there desire to make there bed together in the dust."
