= Spencer Combe =

Historic estate in Devon, England

Coordinates: 50°48′6.75″N 3°42′49.13″W

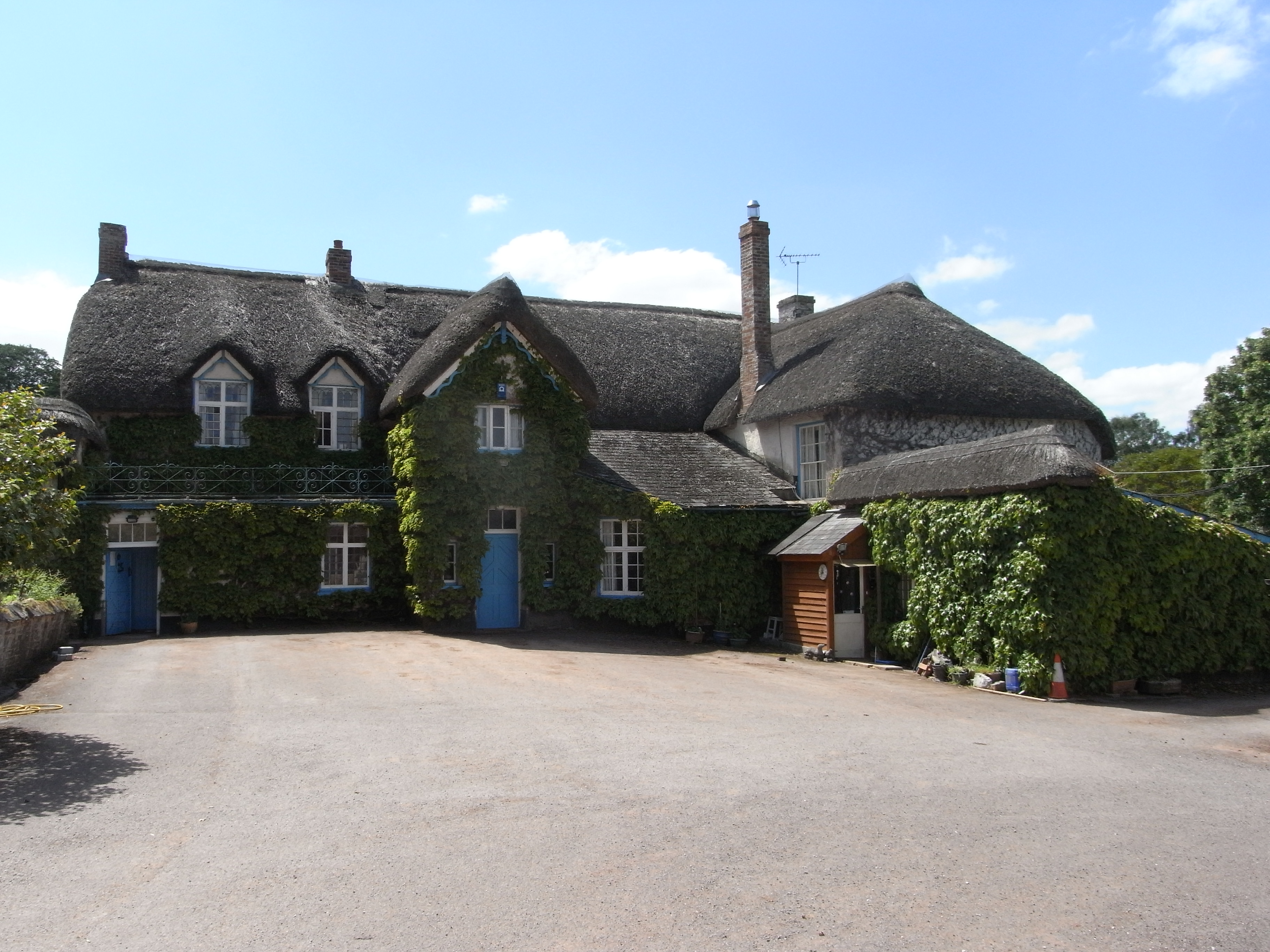
"Spence Combe" House, near Crediton, Devon

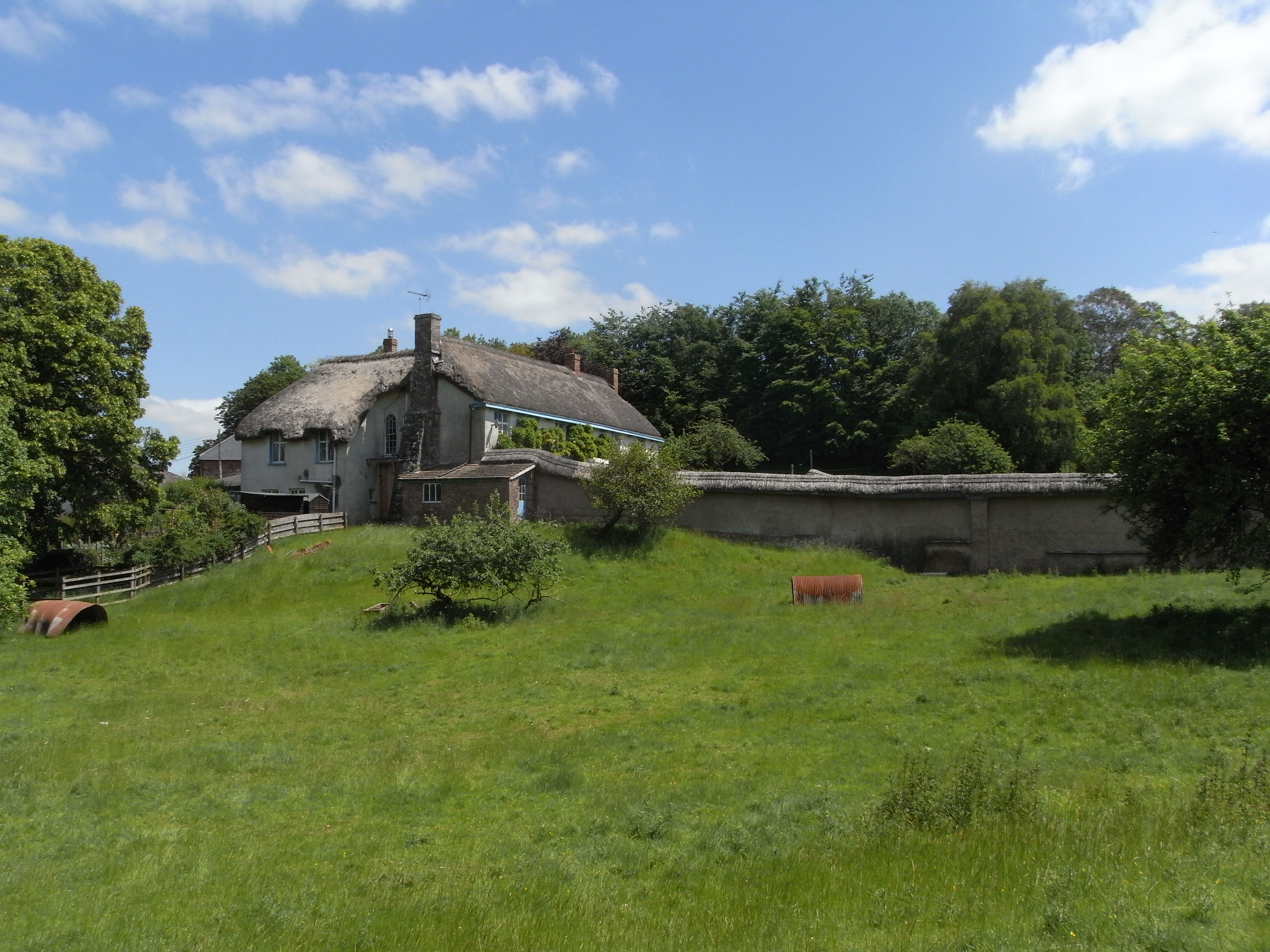
Setting of "Spence Combe"

Arms of Spencer of Spencer Combe, Devon: Argent, on a bend sable two pairs of keys (adorsed, handles entwined) or, blazon by Sir William Pole (d.1635). As visible sculpted on monument to Sir Edmund Prideaux, 1st Baronet (died 1628), of Netherton in the parish of Farway, Devon, in St Michael and All Angels' parish church, Farway

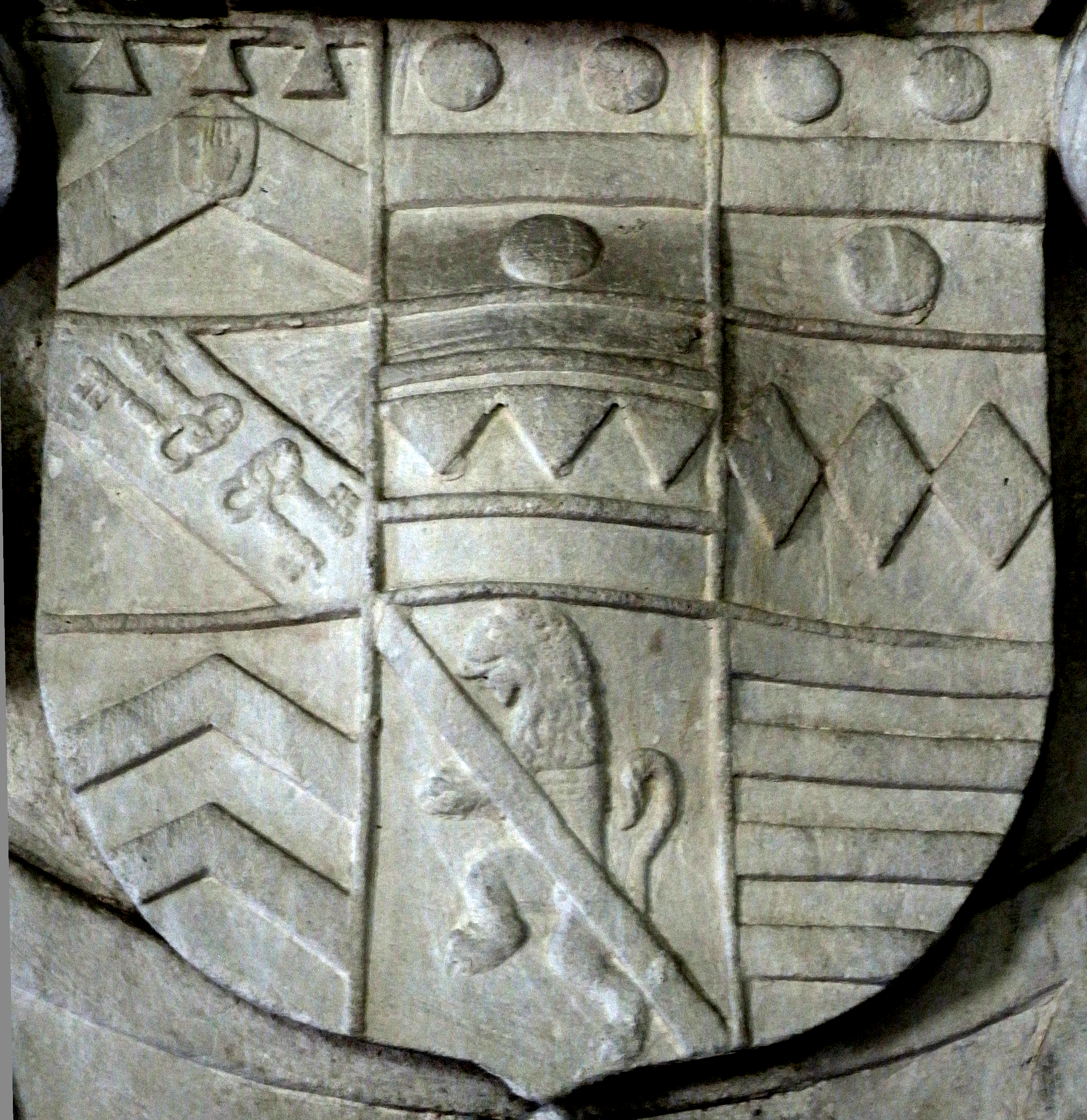
Quartered arms of Sir Edmund Prideaux, 1st Baronet (died 1628), of Netherton on his monument in Farway Church, quarterly of 9: Prideaux, de Adeston (2&3), Spencer of Spencer Combe, Hody of Spencer Combe, Giffard, Esse of Thuborough, unknown (lion rampant), Poyntz

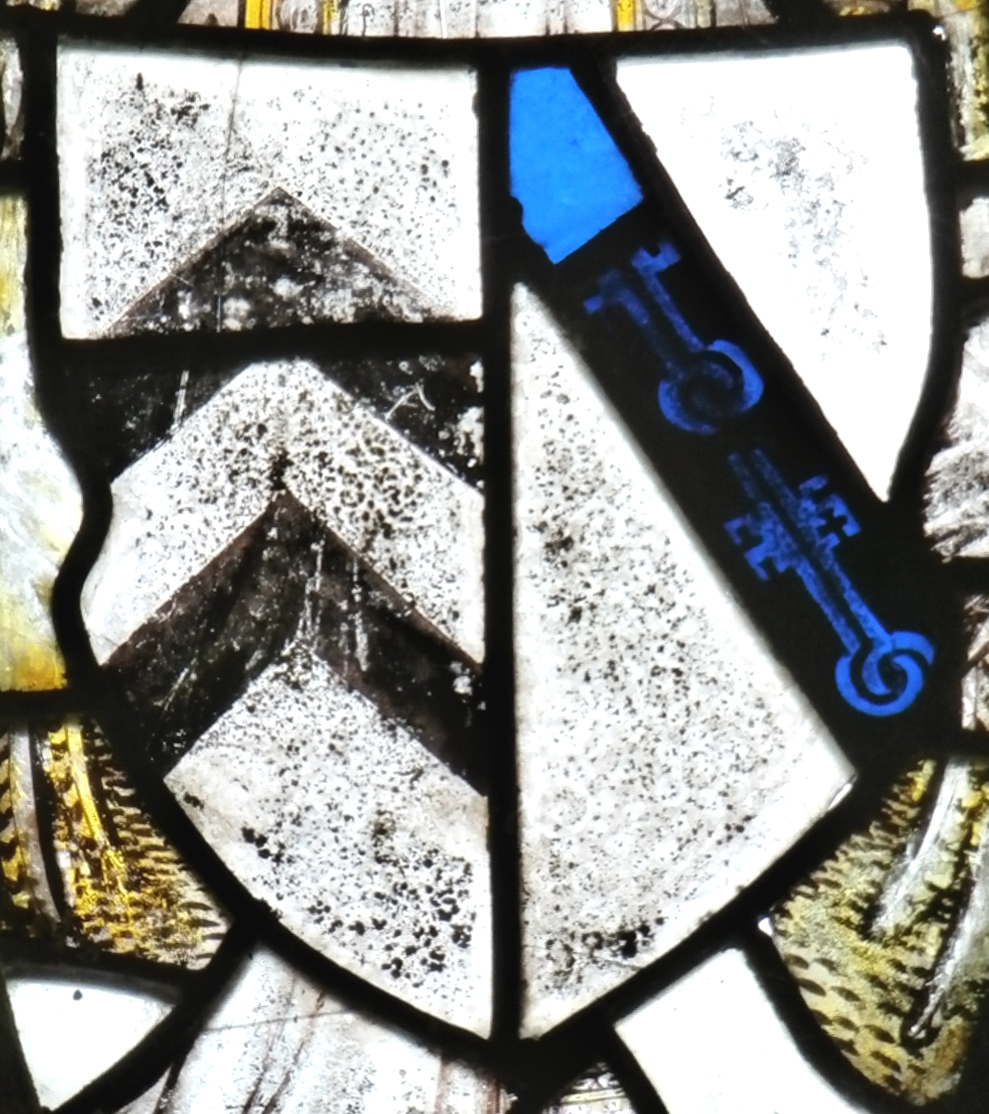
Arms of de Esse of Thuborough, Sutcombe (whose eventual heir was Prideaux), impaling Spencer of Spencer Combe ("key arms"), Thuborough Chapel of Sutcombe Church

Spencer Combe in the parish of Crediton, Devon, is an historic estate. The grade II listed farmhouse known today as "Spence Combe", the remnant of a former mansion house, is situated 3 miles north-west of the town of Crediton.

The arms given by Pole for Spencer of Spencer Combe, are: Argent, on a bend sable two pairs of keys or, and are shown quartered by Prideaux on the monument in Farway Church, Devon, to Sir Edmund Prideaux, 1st Baronet (died 1628) of Netherton Hall, and are shown in stained glass impaled by de Esse of Thuborough in the Thuborough Chapel of Sutcombe Church.

Spencer Combe is given erroneously in several traditional historical sources as the seat of Sir Robert Spencer (d.pre-1510) who married Eleanor Beaufort (1431–1501), the daughter and eventual heiress of Edmund Beaufort, 2nd Duke of Somerset (1406–1455).

== Descent ==
=== Lancells ===
The earliest holder of the estate as recorded by the Devon historian Tristram Risdon (died 1640) was the Lancells family. However the Devon historian Sir William Pole (died 1635) stated Comb Lancelles to be a separate estate to Cumbe, held by the Hody then Spencer families. Indeed, the grade II listed farmhouse known today as "Combe Lancey" survives, situated within the parish of Sandford, to the immediate north-west of Crediton. Pole gave the descent of Comb Lancelles as follows:

- Joce de Lancelles, who inherited Combe during the reign of King Henry III (1216–1272). In 1295 Joceus Lancelles was recorded as holding Combe and Sakington from the feudal barony of Bradninch as 1/8th of a knight's fee and in 1314 Joceus de Lancelles held from the feudal barony of Bradninch as 1/4 of a knight's fee the manors of Sakamenton, Combe, Dowrish, Ashridge and Blakannescombe.
- Hugh Lancelles held Combe in 1345.

=== Hody ===
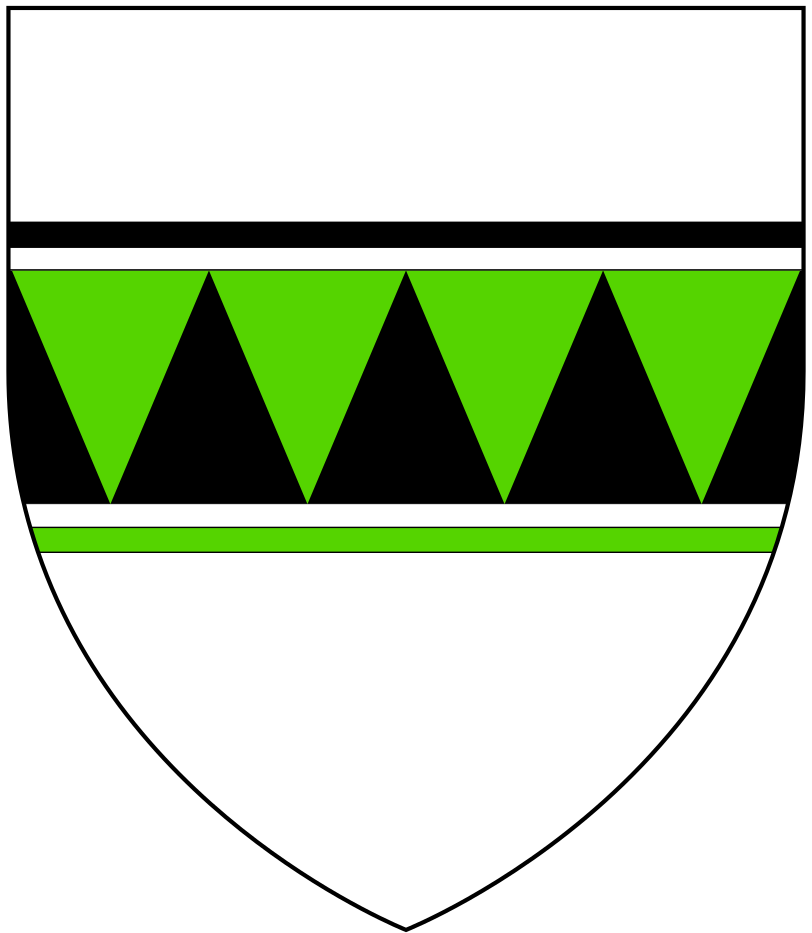
Arms of Hody of Spencer Combe and Nethway: Argent, a fess per fess indented vert and sable between two cotises counterchanged of the fess, as seen in Farway Church on monument of Sir Edmund Prideaux, 1st Baronet

Combe passed by inheritance to the Hody family.

- William Hody, tempore King Richard II (1377–1399), whose daughter Alice Hody, heiress of Combe, was the wife of Richard Spencer. The arms of Hody were Argent, a fess per fess indented vert and sable between two cotises counterchanged of the fess, as seen in Farway Church on the monument of Sir Edmund Prideaux, 1st Baronet

=== Spencer ===
On inheritance by the Spencer family the manor became known as Spencer Combe or Spencer's Combe. The arms of Spencer of Spencer Combe were given by Pole as: Argent, on a bend sable (or azure) two pairs of keys or, and were later quartered by Prideaux, as visible in Farway Church (Prideaux of Netherton) and in Sutcombe Church, in the Thuborough Chapel. The descent is given by Pole as follows:

- Richard Spencer, who married Alice Hody, heiress of Combe.
- Thomas Spencer (son)
- John Spencer (son), who died without male children leaving as his sole heiress his daughter Jone Spencer, wife of Stephen Giffard of Thuborough in the parish of Sutcombe, Devon.

=== Giffard ===
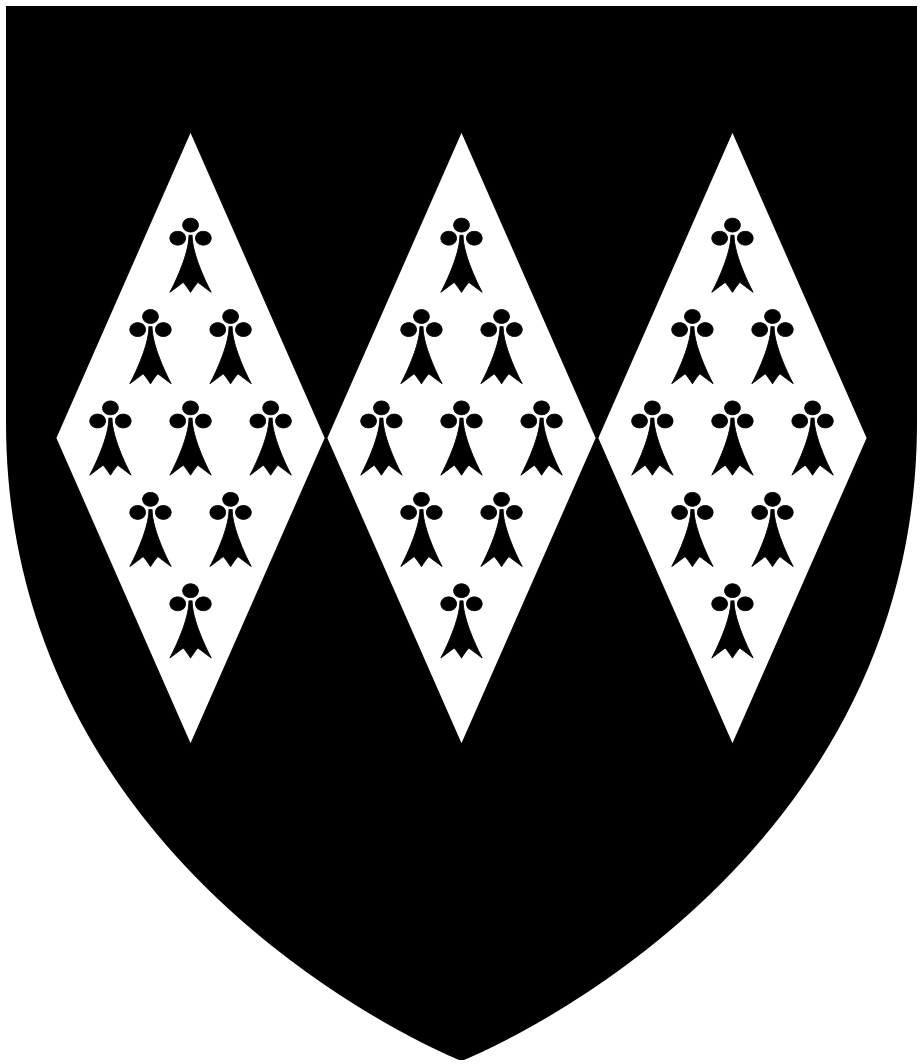
Arms of Giffard: Sable, three fusils conjoined in fesse ermine

- Stephen Giffard (fl. 1438, of Thuborough, who inherited Spencer Combe on his first marriage to Jone Spencer, by whom he left a daughter Alice Giffard, heiress of Combe. He married secondly to Agnes Churchill, daughter and heiress of John Churchill of Wildyard, by whom he had a further two daughters and co-heiresses, Eleanor Giffard, wife of John Dennis of Orleigh and Mariote Giffard, wife of William Calmady (fl. 1458) of Calmady in the parish of Poundstock, Cornwall.
- Alice Giffard, eldest daughter and heiress of Spencer Combe and Thuborough, who married three times:
  - Firstly to John Michelstow of Lanteglos, Cornwall
  - Secondly (as his 3rd wife) to William Prideaux of Adeston in the parish of Holbeton, Devon, Escheator of Cornwall in 1461, by whom she had children.
  - Thirdly to William Wollacombe

=== Prideaux ===
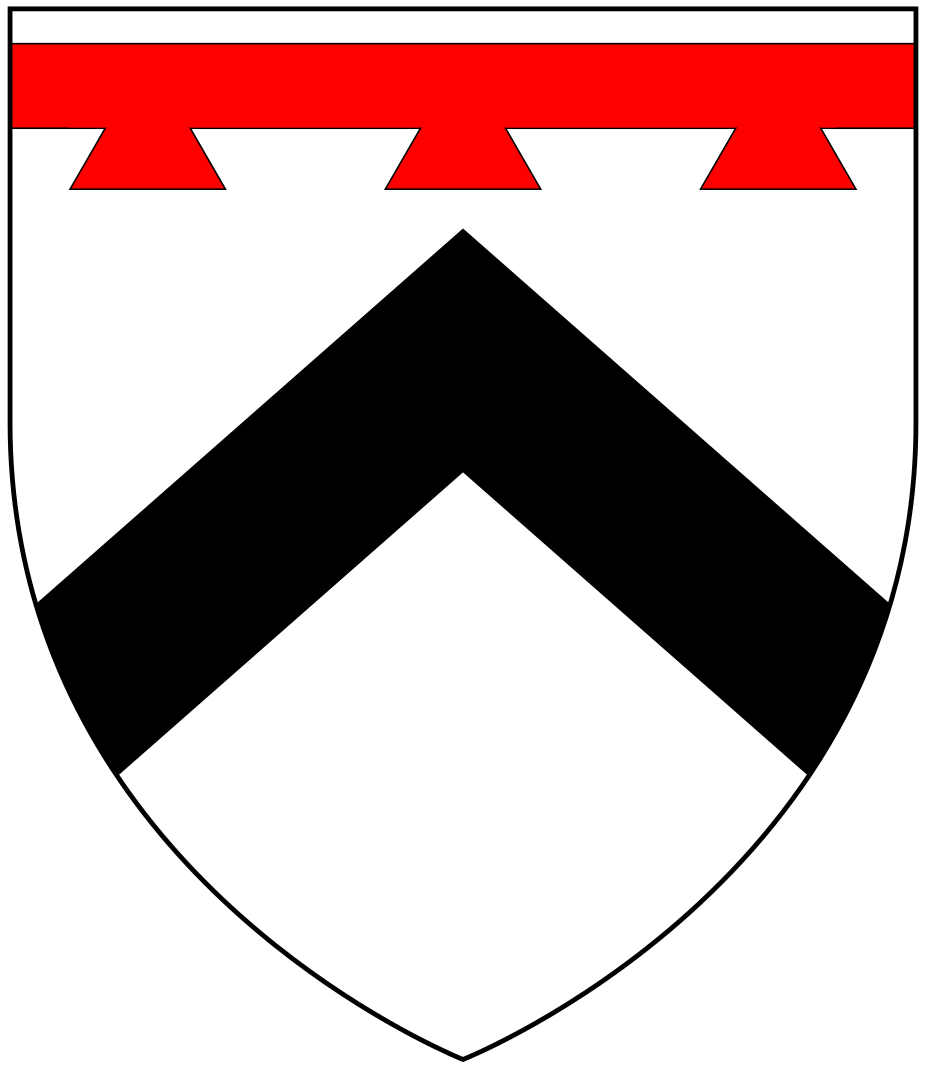
Arms of Prideaux: Argent, a chevron sable in chief a label of three points gules

- William Prideaux of Adeston in the parish of Holbeton, Devon, Escheator of Cornwall in 1461, who married Alice Giffard, heiress of Spencer Combe. He abandoned his old seat of Adeston and made Thuborough his new seat.
- Fulke Prideaux (1472–1531), eldest son and heir, who married as his second wife Katherine Poyntz, daughter of Sir Humphrey Poyntz of Langley in the parish of Yarnscombe, Devon.
- Humphrey Prideaux (1487–1550), son and heir by his father's second wife Katherine Poyntz, who married firstly Joane Fowell daughter of Richard Fowell of Fowelscombe in the parish of Ugborough, Devon, and secondly to Edith Hatch, daughter of William Hatch of North Aller in the parish of South Molton, Devon.
- Richard Prideaux (died 1603), eldest son and heir, of Thuborough, who married Katherine Arundell, a daughter of Sir John Arundell (1495–1561) of Trerice in Cornwall, known as Jack of Tilbury, an Esquire of the Body to King Henry VIII whom he served as Vice-Admiral of the West. Katherine's mother was Mary Bevill, daughter and heiress of John Bevill of Gwarnick, Cornwall and heiress to her nephew John Arundell of Gwarnick.
- Humphry Prideaux (died 1603/4), a younger son, to whom was given Spencer Combe by his father. He was a Councellor at Law, seated at Westwood near Crediton. He married Johanna Bevill (died 1612/13), daughter of John Bevill of Kelligarth, Cornwall.
- Beville Prideaux, son, who married a certain Margaret, the widow of George Leach (1602-pre-1637), 4th son of Sir Simon Leach (1567–1638) of Cadeleigh, near Crediton, Sheriff of Devon in 1624, whose surviving monument in Cadeleigh Church is the largest of its type in Devon. Beville Prideaux sold Spencer Combe to Sir Simon Leach.

=== Leach ===
Sir Simon Leach (1567–1638) of Cadeleigh, near Crediton, Sheriff of Devon in 1624, purchased Spencer Combe from Beville Prideaux.

== Erroneous link to Beaufort family ==
Arms of Sir Robert Spencer (d.circa 1510) given erroneously in Debrett's Peerage as "of Spencer Combe": Sable, two bars nebuly ermine, quartered by Percy and Cary

Spencer Combe is given erroneously in several traditional and reputable historical sources (including The Complete Peerage) as the seat of Sir Robert Spencer (d.pre-1510) who married Eleanor Beaufort (1431–1501), the daughter and eventual heiress of Edmund Beaufort, 2nd Duke of Somerset (1406–1455), KG, the third surviving son of John Beaufort, 1st Earl of Somerset, the eldest of the four legitimised children of John of Gaunt (1340-1399) (third surviving son of King Edward III) by his mistress Katherine Swynford). Sir Robert Spencer left two daughters and co-heiresses, who married into the families of Percy (Henry Percy, 5th Earl of Northumberland) and Cary of Devon (producing descendants Viscounts Falkland, Barons Hunsdon, Barons Cary of Leppington, Earls of Monmouth, Viscounts Rochford and Earls of Dover). The arms of this Sir Robert Spencer were Sable, two bars nebuly ermine, as shown in the Percy window in the chapel of Petworth House in Sussex and as quartered by Cary, Viscount Falkland, which Debrett's Peerage erroneously gives as "Spencer of Spencer Combe".

The American genealogist Douglas Richardson suggests however that Sir Robert Spencer was in fact the son and heir of John Spencer, Esquire, a Member of Parliament for Dorset, of Frampton in Dorset, Ashbury in Devon and Brompton Ralph in Somerset, by his wife Jone. Richardson examined eight lawsuits during the period 1460 to 1510 involving Sir Robert Spencer from which he deduced that he had no connection with Spencer Combe and in fact resided in London and at Bridport in Dorset, and after his marriage at his wife's manor of Chilton Foliat in Wiltshire.
