= Lauren Kassell =

British science and medicine professor

- Education: University of Oxford, Haverford College
- Scientific career
- Workplaces: University of Cambridge
- Thesis: Simon Forman's philosophy of medicine: medicine, astrology and alchemy in London, c.1580-1611 (1997)
- Website: www.people.hps.cam.ac.uk/index/teaching-officers/kassell

Lauren Kassell (born 30 July 1970) is Professor of History of Science and Medicine at the University of Cambridge and a Fellow of Pembroke College, Cambridge. From September 2021 to 2026, she was on leave from Cambridge to serve as the Professor in History of Science at the European University Institute (Florence). She completed a doctorate at the University of Oxford in 1997. She is known for her work on the history of astrology and medicine in early modern England.

Kassell directed the Casebooks project to digitise the medical records of the astrologers Simon Forman and Richard Napier, one of the largest sets of early modern medical records. Kassell was the historical consultant for the 2019 video game Astrologaster, based on her work on Simon Forman.

== Broadcasts ==
- BBC Radio 4 In Our Time 'Alchemy' 24 February 2005.
- BBC Radio 4 In Our Time 'Renaissance Astrology' 14 June 2007.
- BBC Radio 4 In Our Time 'The Unicorn' 28 October 2010.

== Selected publications ==
- Reproduction: Antiquity to the Present Day, Cambridge University Press, Cambridge, 2018. (co-editor and contributor)
- Medicine and Magic in Elizabethan London: Simon Forman, Astrologer, Alchemist, and Physician. Clarendon Press, Oxford, 2005.
