= Simon Forman =

English astrologer, occultist and herbalist

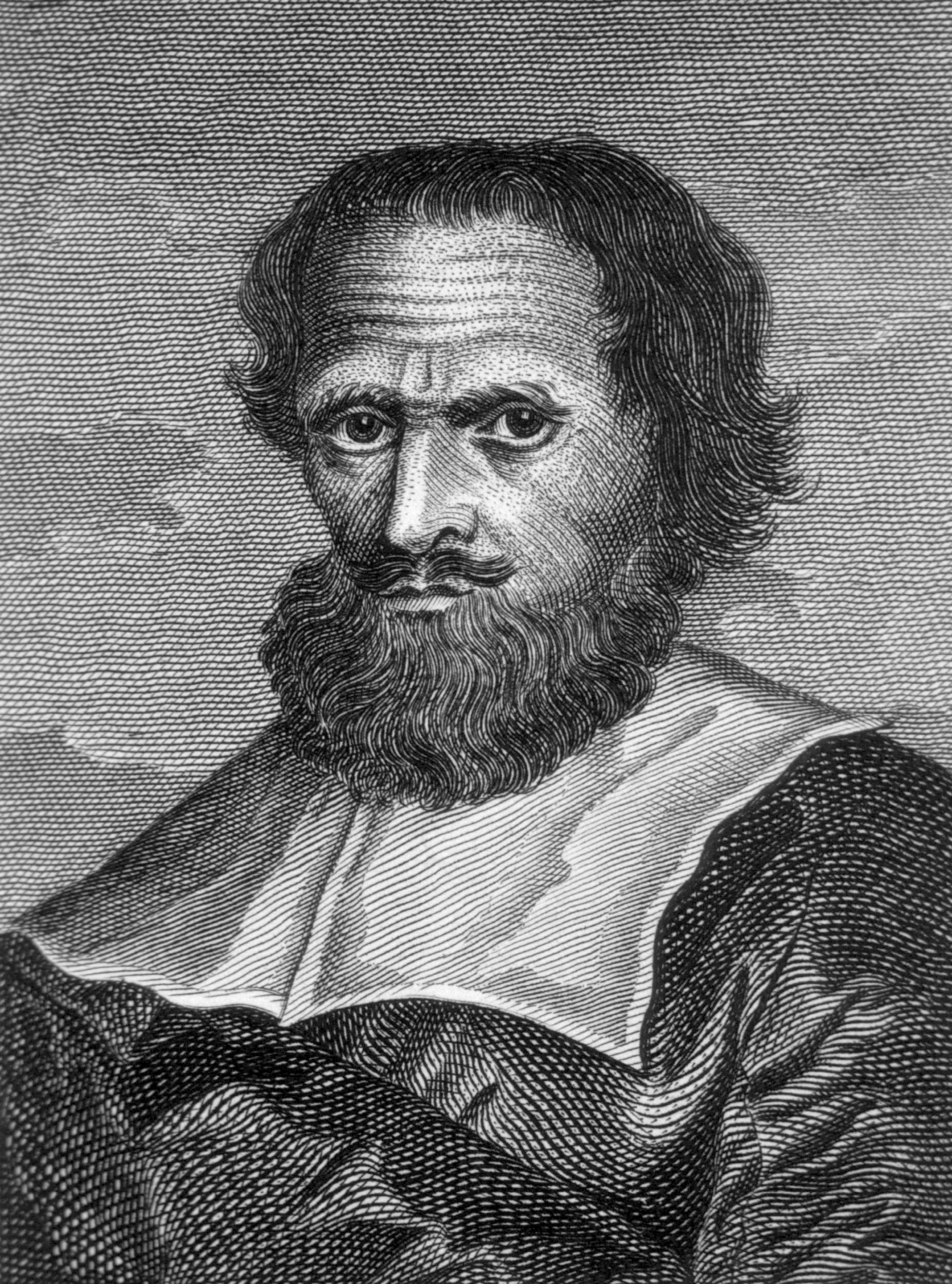
- Born: 31 December 1552; Quidhampton, Wiltshire, England
- Died: 5 or 12 September 1611 (aged 58); London, England
- Resting place: St. Mary's Churchyard, Lambeth
- Education: Magdalen College, Oxford
- Occupations: Astrologer, alchemist, medical practitioner
- Known for: Extensive records of astrological practice, Eye-witness accounts of plays by William Shakespeare; Alleged complicity in murder of Sir Thomas Overbury
- Spouse: Jean Baker

Simon Forman (31 December 1552 – 5 or 12 September 1611) was an Elizabethan astrologer, occultist and herbalist active in London during the reigns of Queen Elizabeth I and James I of England. His reputation, however, was severely tarnished after his death when he was implicated in the plot to kill Thomas Overbury. Astrologers continued to revere him, while writers from Ben Jonson to Nathaniel Hawthorne came to characterise him as either a fool or an evil magician in league with the Devil.

== Life ==
Forman was born in Quidhampton, Fugglestone St Peter, near Salisbury, Wiltshire, on 31 December 1552. At the age of nine he went to a local free school, the City Grammar School, Salisbury, but was forced to leave after two years following the death of his father on 31 December 1563. For the next ten years of his life he was apprenticed to Matthew Commin, a local merchant. Commin traded in cloth, salt and herbal medicines, and it was during his time as a young apprentice that Forman started to learn about herbal remedies. After arguments with Mrs Commin, Simon found his apprenticeship terminated, and he eventually went to study at Oxford as a poor scholar. He then spent a year and a half at Magdalen College, Oxford, where he may have become interested in medicine and astrology.

Through the 1570s and 1580s Forman worked as a teacher while studying the occult arts. In his diary for 1582 he recorded that he fell into the hands of the men-of-war at Studland in Dorset, a base for pirates, and returned home 6 weeks later.

In the early 1590s he moved to London starting up a practice as a physician in Philpot Lane. Having survived an outbreak of the plague in 1592 his medical reputation began to spread. In 1597 a Buckinghamshire clergyman named Richard Napier (1559–1634) became his protégé. In the 1590s Forman began to develop a more serious interest in the occult, eventually setting up a thriving practice as an astrologer physician, documented in his detailed casebooks of his clients' questions about illness, pregnancy, stolen goods, career opportunities and marriage prospects. His success and his methods attracted the attention of the College of Physicians (now the Royal College of Physicians) who attempted to ban him from medical practice. He eventually obtained a licence to practise from the University of Cambridge in 1603.

With a notable sexual appetite, Forman pursued numerous women. He wrote of his conquests in his diaries, showing as little regard for the background of his inamoratas as for the location of consummation. Many of his clients provided brief affairs. He wrote of having his first sex with his "beloved" on "15/12/1593, 5:00 PM, London." Then writing after "She died 13/6/1597." On 22 July 1599, Forman wed seventeen-year-old Jane Baker. Having never been content with just one woman, the marriage "did not make much difference to [his] way of life, except that he had an inexperienced girl now as mistress of the house; he continued to be master". In 1611, he accurately predicted his own death on the River Thames. Another astrologer, William Lilly, reports that one warm Sunday afternoon in September of that year, Forman told his wife that he would die the following Thursday night (12 September):

Monday came, all was well. Tuesday came, he not sick. Wednesday came, and still he was well; with which his impertinent wife did much twit him in his teeth. Thursday came, and dinner was ended, he very well: he went down to the water-side, and took a pair of oars to go to some buildings he was in hand with in Puddle-dock. Being in the middle of the Thames, he presently fell down, only saying, 'An impost, an impost,' and so died. A most sad storm of wind immediately following.

Five years after his death he was implicated in the murder of Thomas Overbury when two of his patients, Lady Frances Howard and Mrs Anne Turner, were found guilty of the crime. During the testimony of Howard's trial, lawyers hurled accusations at Forman, saying he had given Lady Essex the potion with which she plotted to kill Overbury. During the trial he was described by Sir Edward Coke, Lord Chief Justice of the King's Bench, as the "Devil Forman"; the result being that his reputation was severely tarnished.

== Works ==
Forman's papers have proven to be a treasure trove of rare, odd, unusual data on one of the most studied periods of cultural history. They include autobiographies, guides to astrology, plague tracts, alchemical commonplace books and notes on biblical and historical subjects. They also contain his disputes with the College of Physicians and his largely unsuccessful magical experiments. At one time he possessed the copy of the Picatrix currently in the British Library. Forman left behind a large body of manuscripts dealing with his patients and with all the subjects that interested him, from astronomy and astrology to medicine, mathematics and magic. His Casebooks are the most famous of these resources. They, like his diaries and autobiographies, contain extensive details of his life. His only printed work was a pamphlet advertising a bogus method for divining longitude while at sea.

His intimate knowledge of Shakespeare's circle makes him especially attractive to literary historians. Modern scholars—A. L. Rowse is one prominent example, (Note: Rowse's books Shakespeare the Man (London, Macmillan, 1973) and Sex and Society in Shakespeare's Age: Simon Forman the Astrologer (New York, Charles Scribner's Sons, 1974) draw heavily on Forman sources.) and others have followed his lead—have exploited Forman's manuscripts for the manifold lights they throw on the less-exposed private lives of Elizabethan and Jacobean men and women. One of Forman's patients was the poet Emilia Lanier, Rowse's candidate to have been William Shakespeare's Dark Lady; another patient was Mrs Mountjoy, Shakespeare's landlady. Sixty-four volumes of his manuscripts were collected by Elias Ashmole in the seventeenth century, and are now held in the Bodleian Library, Oxford. His records have been digitised by a team led by Professor Lauren Kassell of the University of Cambridge.

=== The "Book of Plays" ===
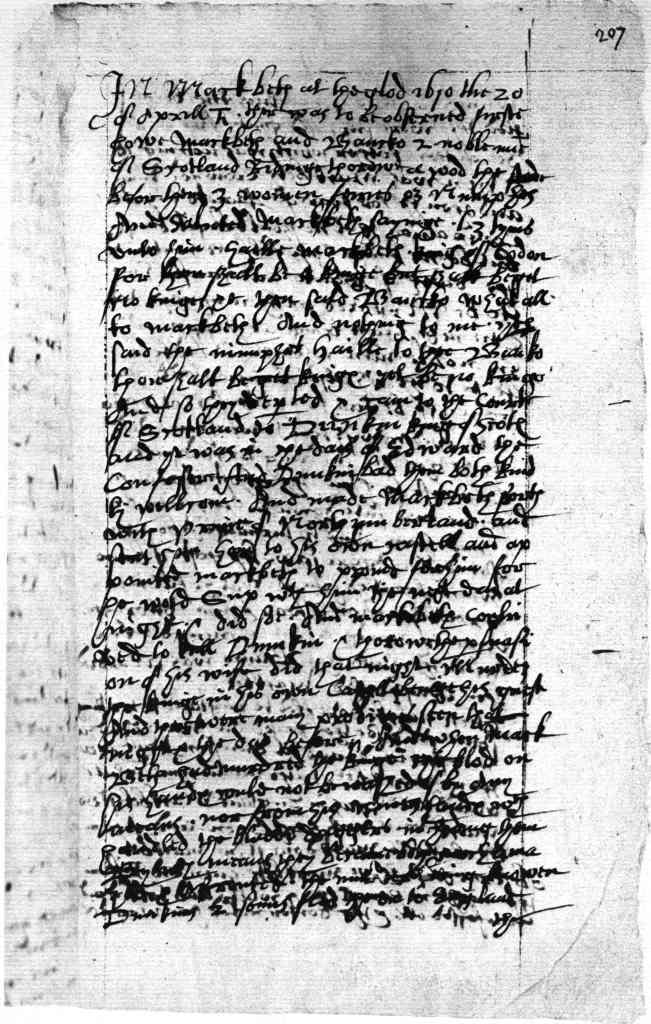
Simon Forman's description of a production of Macbeth at the Globe Theatre, 20 April 1610. Oxford, Bodleian Library, MS. Ashmole 208, f. 207r.

Among Forman's manuscripts is a section titled the "Bocke of Plaies", which records Forman's descriptions of four plays he saw in 1610–11 and the morals he drew from them. The document is noteworthy for the listing of three Shakespearean performances: Macbeth at the Globe Theatre on 20 April 1610; The Winter's Tale at the Globe on 15 May 1611; and Cymbeline, date and theatre not specified. The fourth play described by Forman is a Richard II acted at the Globe on 30 April 1611; but from the description it is clearly not Shakespeare's Richard II. The manuscript was first described by John Payne Collier in 1836, and in the 20th century it was suspected as one of his forgeries. Most modern scholars now accept the section as authentic, but some still suspect it could be a forgery.

== References in fiction ==
Simon Forman is the protagonist of the Elizabethan mystery series by Judith Cook, The Casebook of Dr Simon Forman—Elizabethan doctor and solver of mysteries. The novels are based on the original casebook manuscripts, and contain a mix of historical and fictional characters.

Dr Moth, a role loosely based on Forman, is played by Antony Sher in the 1998 film Shakespeare in Love.

Forman's life and work form the basis of the 2019 video game Astrologaster in which he is voiced by Dave Jones.

== Works cited ==
- Judith Cook, Blood on the Borders: The Casebook of Dr. Simon Forman–Elizabethan Doctor and Solver of Mysteries, London, Headline, 1999.
- Judith Cook, Dr. Simon Forman: A Most Notorious Physician, London, Chatto & Windus, 2001.
- Lauren Kassell, Medicine and Magic in Elizabethan London: Simon Forman, Astrologer, Alchemist, and Physician, Oxford, Oxford University Press, 2005.
- Barbara Howard Traister, The Notorious Astrological Physician of London: Works and Days of Simon Forman, Chicago and London, University of Chicago Press, 2001.
