= Sir John Napier, 4th Baronet =

English landowner and politician

Member of Parliament for Bedfordshire
- In office 1664–1669

Personal details
- Born: 1636
- Died: 1711 (aged 74–75)
- Spouse: Elizabeth Biddulph (m. 1666)
- Parent: Robert Napier (father)
- Relatives: Robert Napier (grandfather); John Egerton (grandfather)

Sir John Napier, 4th Baronet (1636–1711) was an English landowner and politician who sat in the House of Commons between 1664 and 1679.

== Biography ==
Napier was the son of Sir Robert Napier, 2nd Baronet and his second wife Penelope Egerton, daughter of John Egerton, 1st Earl of Bridgwater and was baptised at Luton Hoo on 5 July 1636. He succeeded to the family estates on the death of his father on 4 March 1661. He also inherited the re-patented Napier baronetcy since his father had surrendered the original patent when disinheriting the family of his first wife.

In 1664, Napier was elected Member of Parliament for Bedfordshire in the Cavalier Parliament. When his nephew died in April 1675, he succeeded to the earlier Napier baronetcy of 1611, as heir male to his father.

Napier later became insane and had a commission awarded against him in spring 1710. He died at the age of about 75.

Napier married by licence issued 25 August 1666, Elizabeth Biddulph, daughter of Sir Theophilus Biddulph, 1st Baronet and his wife Susanna Highlord, daughter of Zachary Highlord, of London.

Parliament of England
Preceded by Lord Bruce of Whorlton; Sir Humphrey Winch, Bt	Member of Parliament for Bedfordshire; 1664–1669; With: Sir Humphrey Winhc, Bt	Succeeded by Lord Russell; Sir Humphrey Monoux Bt
Baronetage of England
Preceded by Robert Napier	Baronet (of Luton Hoo); 1675–1711	Succeeded by Theophilus Napier
