= Richard Napier =

English astrologer and medical practitioner

- Born: 1559
- Died: 1 April 1634 (aged 74–75)
- Relatives: Robert Napier (brother); Archibald Napier (uncle); Robert Napier (nephew)

Richard Napier (1559 – 1 April 1634) was a prominent English astrologer and medical practitioner.

== Life ==
Also known as Dr Richard Sandy, he was the brother of Sir Robert Napier of Luton Hoo, Bedfordshire. He was a pupil of Simon Forman and inherited his manuscripts, including a copy of the Picatrix (now in the British Library). He became rector of Great Linford, Buckinghamshire in 1589.

Napier was appointed a curate to preach in his place while he practised astrology, which was intertwined with his devout Anglicanism and interest in medicine. He claimed to speak with the archangel Raphael frequently, and occasionally with the archangel Michael. His clients included Emanuel Scrope, 1st Earl of Sunderland as well as the Earl of Bolingbroke and Lord Wentworth, who reputedly protected him from the actions of magistrates.

His sister, Mary Napier married Sir Thomas Myddelton of Chirk Castle, the son of Sir Thomas Myddelton, Lord Mayor of London who was also one of his patients. It was said of him that he was so devout that his knees grew horny by much praying, and he reputedly died in that posture on 1 April 1634 and was buried on 15 April. His many papers came into the hands of Elias Ashmole and are now in the Bodleian Library, Oxford. His records have been digitised by a team led by Professor Lauren Kassell of the University of Cambridge.
