= Astrologaster =

2019 video game

- Developer: Nyamyam
- Publisher: Nyamyam
- Director: Jennifer Schneidereit
- Writer: Katharine Neil
- Composer: Andrea Boccadoro
- Platforms: iOS; Microsoft Windows macOS; Nintendo Switch
- Release: iOS; May 2, 2019; Windows, macOS; May 9, 2019; Nintendo Switch; February 18, 2021

Astrologaster is a comedy narrative adventure video game developed and published by Nyamyam. It was released for iOS on 2 May 2019, for Microsoft Windows and macOS on 9 May 2019, and for Nintendo Switch on 18 February 2021. The game centres around the historical 16th-century physician and astrologer Simon Forman and the characters he encounters, who demand diagnoses, treatments, and sometimes to be read fortunes written in the stars.

== Gameplay ==
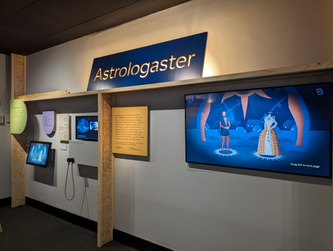
Playable Astrologaster exhibit at the British Library, 2023

The player controls Simon Forman (Dave Jones), a real-life astrologer, occultist, and herbalist active in London during the reigns of Elizabeth I and James I of England. After examining the skies for hints about patients' personal lives, the player can suggest a treatment or course of action for them. The game was inspired by Forman's casebooks. A number of patients are based on real historical figures including Emilia Lanier (Katherine Rodden), Robert Devereux (Rich Keeble), Thomas Blague (Richard Reed) and Alice Blague (Natalie Winter).

== Development ==
The game was developed by Nyamyam after creative director Jennifer Schneidereit saw Lauren Kassell present her research on Simon Forman's casebooks at the University of Cambridge. Inspired by the wealth of character and story material, and with the help of Kassel's research team, Nyamyam researched Forman's life and original patient records for inspiration for the game's characters and stories.

== Reception ==
Reception

Aggregate scores
Aggregator	Score
Metacritic	74/100 (PC); 89/100 (iOS); 75/100 (Switch)
OpenCritic	81% recommend

Review scores
Publication	Score
Game Informer	60/100
Nintendo Life	80/100
The Guardian	80/100

The game was released for iOS on 2 May 2019, for Microsoft Windows and macOS on 9 May 2019, and for Nintendo Switch on 18 February 2021.

According to review aggregator Metacritic, the PC version received mixed or average reviews while the iOS version received generally favourable reviews from critics. Fellow review aggregator OpenCritic assessed that the game received strong approval, being recommended by 81% of critics.

Astrologaster was featured on The Gadget Show and appeared on a number of "best of" lists for video games in 2019.

Astrologaster was nominated for "Excellence in Audio" at the 22nd Annual IGF Awards, and for "Best Music for an Indie Game", "Best Music in a Casual Game", and "Best Original Choral Composition" at the 18th Annual G.A.N.G. Awards.

In 2023 Astrologaster was featured in the British Library Digital Storytelling Exhibit, during which a Q&A was held with Schneidereit and Kassell alongside performances of songs from the game's soundtrack by a live vocal quartet.
