= Thuborough =

Historic estate in Devon, England

Coordinates: 50.868°N 4.349°W

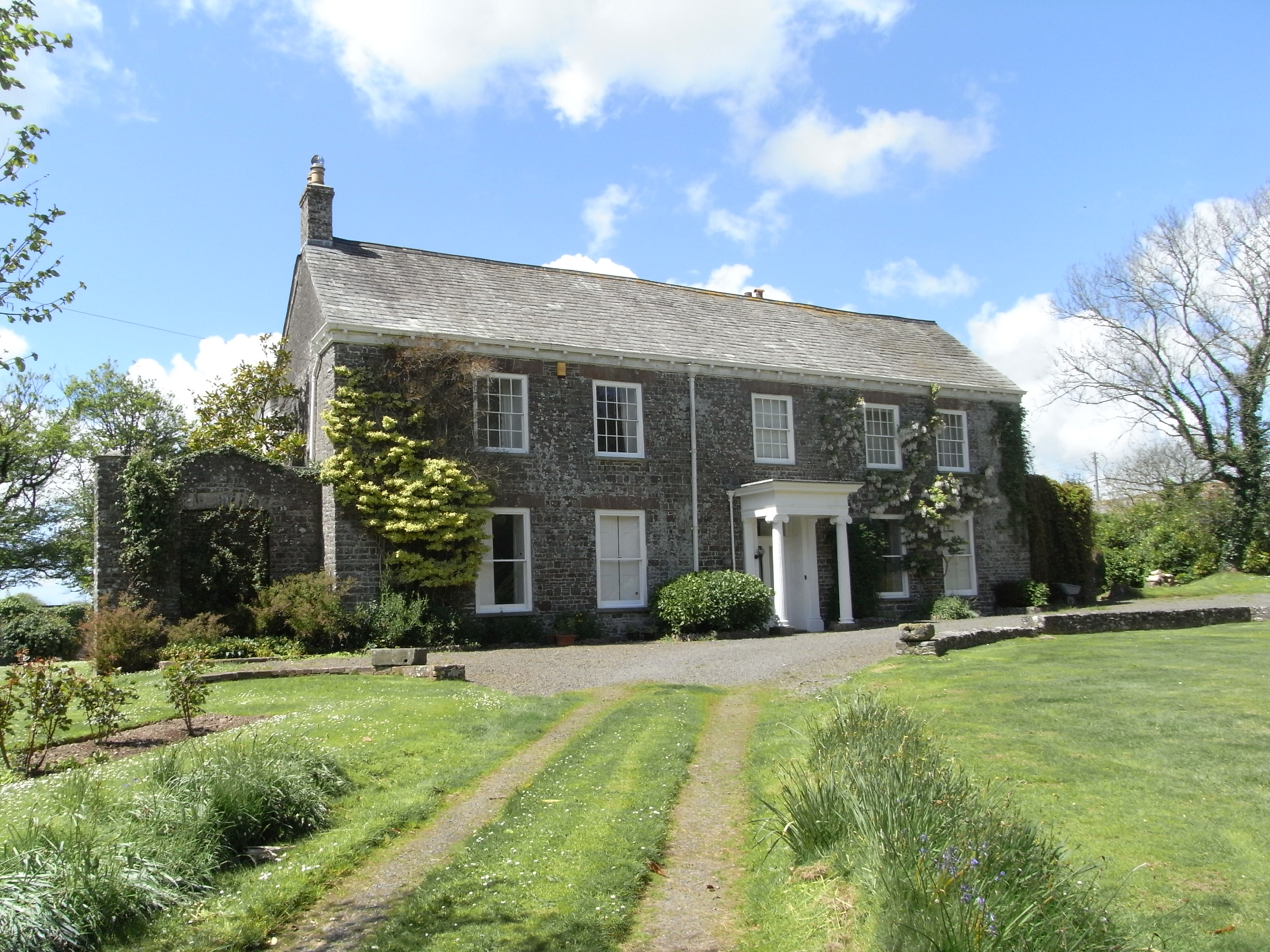
Thuborough, east front, comprising "Thuborough House". The attached north-east block (behind right) comprises "Thuborough Barton"

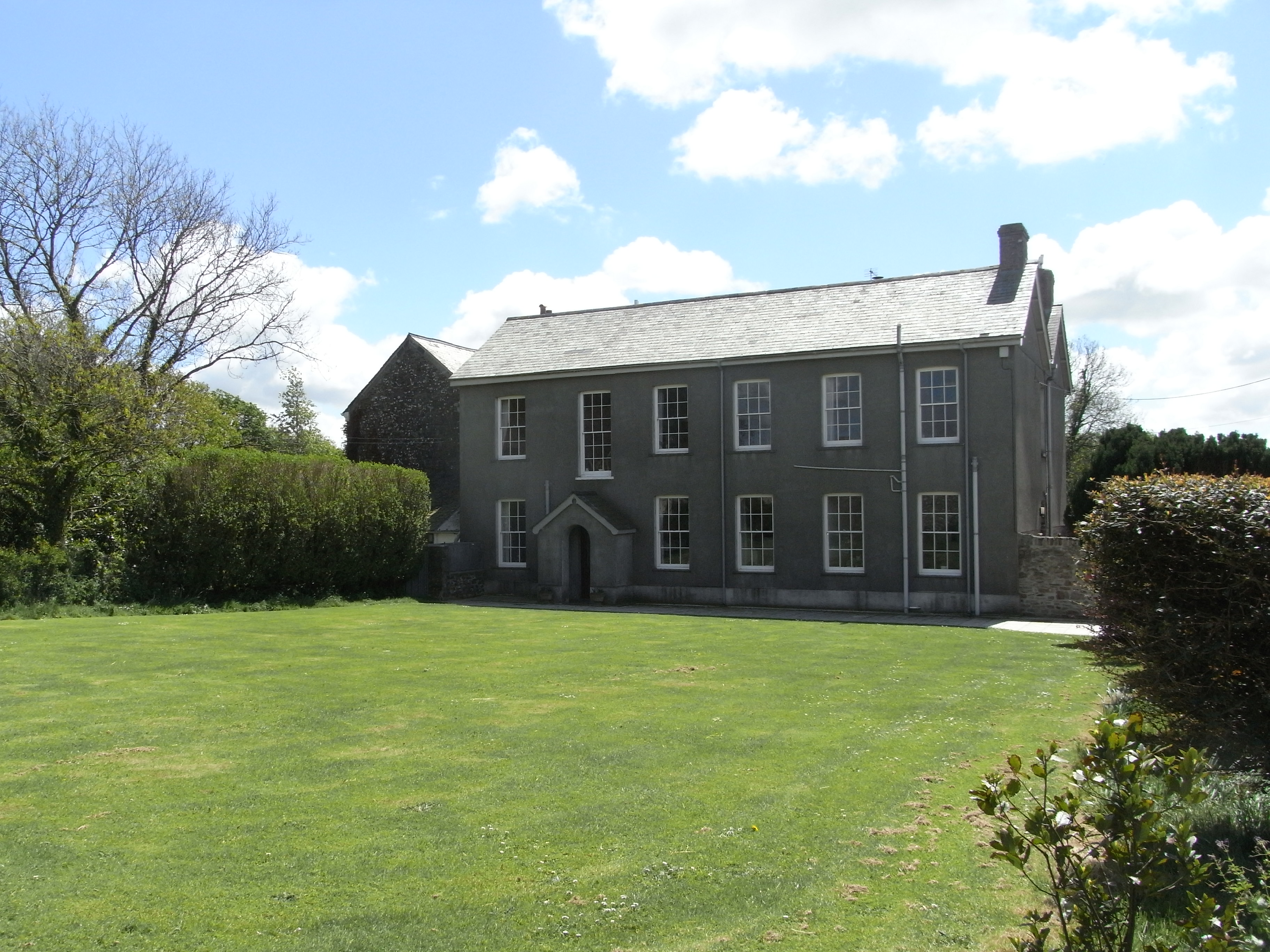
Thuborough, north front, comprising "Thuborough Barton"

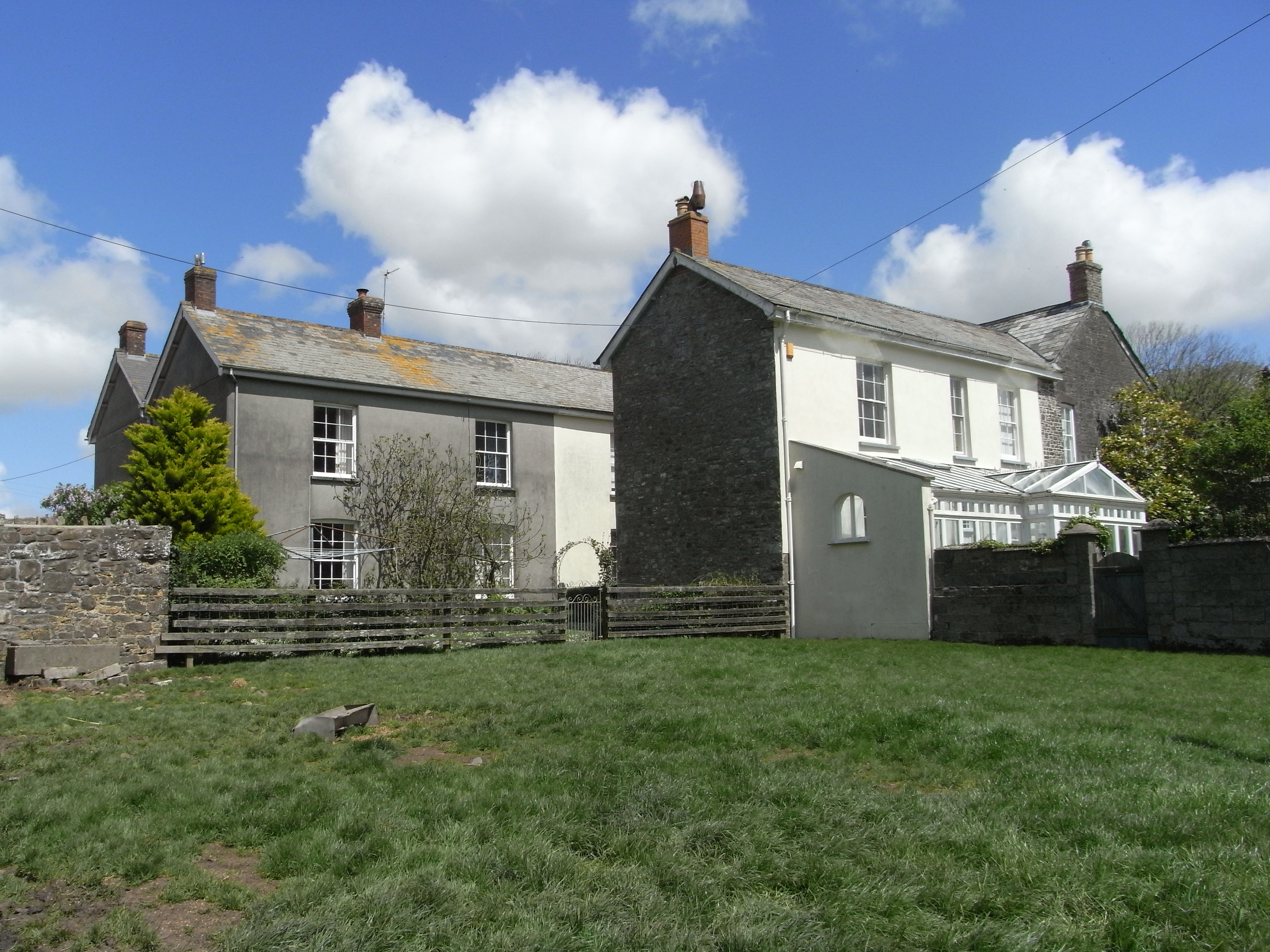
Thuborough, south fronts, of "Thuborough Barton" (left) and of "Thuborough House" (right)

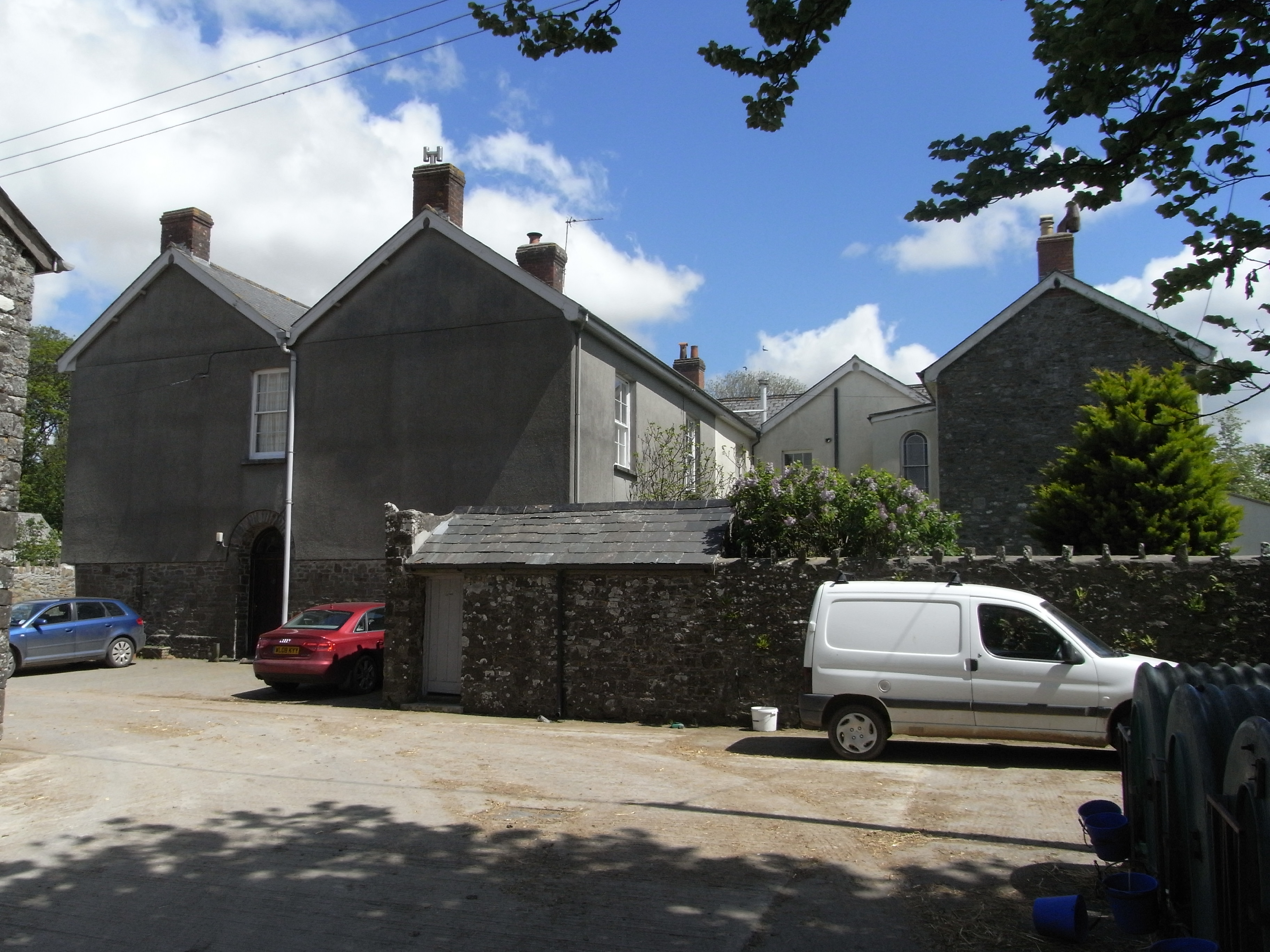
Thuborough, west side. To the left (north) is "Thuborough Barton", to the right (south) is "Thuborough House"

Thuborough (alias Therborough, Theoburgh, etc.) in the parish of Sutcombe, Devon, England, is an historic estate, formerly a seat of a branch of the Prideaux family, also seated at Orcharton, Modbury; Adeston, Holbeton; Soldon, Holsworthy; Netherton, Farway; Ashburton; Nutwell, Woodbury; Ford Abbey, Thorncombe, all in Devon and at Prideaux Place, Padstow and Prideaux Castle, Luxulyan, in Cornwall. The present mansion house, comprising "Thuborough House" and "Thuborough Barton", the north-east block, is a grade II listed building.

== Descent ==
=== Brictwold ===
The Anglo-Saxon holder of the estate of Teweberie (in the hundred of Black Torrington) immediately prior to the Norman Conquest of 1066 was Bristvold, as recorded in the Domesday Book of 1086, the standardised spelling of which name is Brictwold. A man named Brictwold, spelled variously as Bristvold, Brictvold, Bristvoldus, Bristoald, Brictwold, etc., held 11 other estates in Devon as listed in the Domesday Book, namely:

- Stoodleigh in the parish of West Buckland
- Plaistow in the parish of Shirwell
- Varley in the parish of Marwood
- Poulston in the parish of Halwell
- Bradninch, now a parish
- Parracombe in the parish of Shirwell
- Churchill in the parish of East Down
- Beare, of uncertain location
- Flete
- Twitchen in the parish of Arlington
- Staplehill in the parish of Ilsington

=== de Aumale ===
The manor of Teweberie was held in 1086 by Robert de Aumale (fl. 1086) (Latinised to de Albemarle), one of the Devon Domesday Book tenants-in-chief of King William the Conqueror (1066-1087). His tenant was a certain Franco. Robert's lands, comprising 17 entries in the Domesday Book of 1086, later formed part of the very large Feudal barony of Plympton, whose later barons were the Courtenay family, Earls of Devon. Robert was lord of Aumale in Normandy, now in the département of Seine-Maritime, France. As recorded in the 12th/13th century Book of Fees, a later tenant of the estate of Thefebergh, but holding it from the feudal barony of Plympton, was a certain Ralph de Alba Mara, whose relationship to Robert de Aumale is unrecorded. Ralph also held the estate of Kismeldon in West Putford.

=== de Esse/Ashe ===
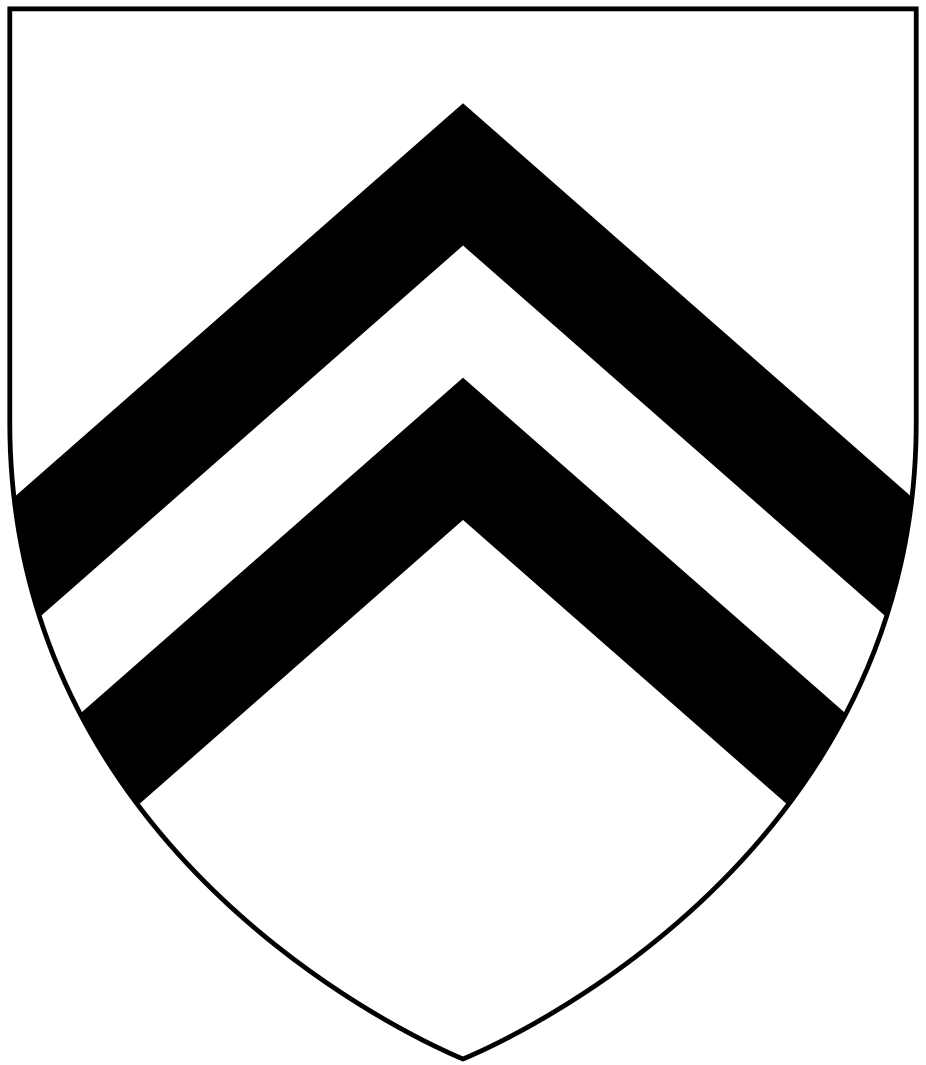
Arms of de Esse or de Ashe/Aysshe: Argent, two chevrons sable

The de Esse or de Ashe/Aysshe family took its surname from one of the many ancient estates in Devon named Esse/Ash. A branch of the family survived seated at the manor of Sowton (alias Clist Fomeson/Somson) until the 18th century. The arms of this family were: Argent, two chevrons sable, and "were quartered by several worthy families" according to the Devon historian Tristram Risdon (d.1640), who recorded the following descent of the manor of Therborough:

- Sir Ralph de Esse, tempore King Henry III (1216-1272)
- Sir Alan de Esse, tempore King Richard II (1377-1399), who left two daughters and co-heiresses:
  - Ingaret de Esse, eldest daughter, heiress of Thuborough, wife firstly of Andrew Giffard and secondly wife of Richard Halse of Kennedon
  - Elizabeth de Esse, wife of John Giffard of Helland, Cornwall.

=== Giffard ===
The descent of Thuborough in the Giffard family was as follows:

- Andrew Giffard, second son of John II Giffard of Halsbury in the parish of Parkham, Devon, by his wife Jone Deuclive, daughter and heiress of Richard Deuclive.
- John Giffard *(son) of Thuborough, who married Alice Ugworthy, a daughter and co-heiress of John Ugworthy.
- Stephen Giffard (fl. 1438) (son) of Thuborough who married firstly to Joan Spencer, daughter and heiress of John Spencer of Spencer Combe, Tedburn St Mary, near Crediton.

== Sources ==
- Vivian, Lt.Col. J.L., (Ed.) The Visitations of the County of Devon: Comprising the Heralds' Visitations of 1531, 1564 & 1620, Exeter, 1895, pp. 618–620, pedigree of Prideaux of Adeston and Thuborough
