= Sir Robert Napier, 1st Baronet, of Luton Hoo =

English merchant

Sir Robert Napier, 1st Baronet of Luton Hoo

High Sheriff of Bedfordshire
- In office 1611-1612

Personal details
- Born: 1560
- Died: 22 April 1637 (aged 76–77)
- Spouse(s): Elizabeth Staper; Margaret Barnes; Mary Robinson
- Children: 7, including Robert
- Relatives: Richard Napier (brother); Sir Archibald Napier (uncle)

Sir Robert Napier, 1st Baronet (1560 – 22 April 1637), of Luton Hoo in Bedfordshire, also referred to as Robert Sandy, was an English merchant.

== Origins ==
He was the second son of Alexander Napier (alias Sandy) of Exeter, Devon, by his wife Anne Birchley, daughter of Edward Birchley of Hertfordshire. Alexander was a son of Sir Alexander Napier of Scotland, and was a brother of Sir Archibald Napier. He had left Scotland during the reign of King Henry VIII (1509–1547) and settled in the city of Exeter. The Napier family claimed descent from the Scottish Earls of Lennox. Sir Robert's younger brother was Rev. Richard Napier (1559–1634), a noted astrologer and Rector of Linford, Buckinghamshire. The arms of Napier of Luton Hoo were: Argent, a saltire engrailed between four roses (cinquefoils) gules.

== Career ==
He lived in Bishopsgate Street in the City of London, was a member of the Grocers' Company and was a Turkey Merchant, and through trade with Turkey amassed a fortune and purchased the estate of Luton Hoo in Bedfordshire. He was knighted in 1611 during the progress from Scotland through England of King James I, who subsequently created him a baronet "of Luton Hoo" on 25 November 1612. He served as High Sheriff of Bedfordshire in 1611. In 1613 he was elected Sheriff of London but declined to serve, for which he was fined 400 marks.

== Marriages and children ==
He married three times:

- Firstly to Elizabeth Staper, without children
- Secondly to Margaret Barnes, daughter of Richard Barnes, a Citizen of the City of London and member of the Worshipful Company of Mercers, without children.
- Thirdly to Mary Robinson, daughter of John Robinson, merchant, by whom he had three sons and four daughters as follows:
  - Sir Robert Napier, 2nd Baronet (c.1603 –1661), eldest son and heir.
  - Sir Richard Napier of Linford
  - Alexander Napier
  - Mary Napier, wife of General Sir Thomas Myddelton (1586 –1666) of Chirk Castle, Wales, a Parliamentarian commander during the Civil War.
  - Christiana Napier, wife of Sir Thomas Eversfield of Sussex.
  - Sarah Napier, wife of Sir Walter Leach (1599-pre-1637) of Cadeleigh, Devon, son and heir of Sir Simon Leach (1567–1638) of Cadeleigh, Sheriff of Devon in 1624. Her kneeling effigy survives on her father-in-law's large monument in Cadeleigh Church, the largest of its kind in Devon.
  - Margaret Napier, wife of General Thomas Mytton (c.1597 –1656) of Halston, Shropshire, a Parliamentarian commander during the Civil War.

== Sources ==
- Leigh Rayment's Peerage Pages
- Dictionary of National Biography
- Burke's Extinct and Dormant Baronetcies (2nd edition, London: John Russell Smith, 1844)

Political offices
Preceded by Sir Francis Ventris	High Sheriff of Bedfordshire; 1611–1612	Succeeded by William Beecher
Baronetage of England
New creation	Baronet (of Luton Hoo); 1611–1637	Succeeded by Robert Napier
