= Sir Robert Napier, 2nd Baronet =

English member of parliament

Member of Parliament for Peterborough
- In office 1641–1648

Member of Parliament for Weymouth and Melcombe Regis
- In office 1628–1629

Member of Parliament for Corfe Castle
- In office 1625–1626

Personal details
- Born: c. 1603
- Died: 7 March 1661 (aged 57–58)
- Spouse(s): Frances Thornhurst; Penelope Egerton
- Children: 4, including John
- Parent: Robert Napier (father)
- Education: Exeter College, Oxford

Sir Robert Napier, 2nd Baronet (c. 1603 – 7 March 1661), of Luton Hoo in Bedfordshire, was an English member of parliament.

== Biography ==
He was the eldest son of Sir Robert Napier, 1st Baronet, and succeeded to the baronetcy on 22 April 1637, having already been knighted in his own right on 23 April 1623. He was educated at Exeter College, Oxford and was a member of Gray's Inn. He sat in Parliament as member for Corfe Castle in the Parliament of 1625-6 and for Weymouth in that of 1628–9, then represented Peterborough in the Long Parliament until being excluded in Pride's Purge.

Sir Robert married, first, Frances Thornhurst by whom he had one son, Robert. He died within his father's lifetime and his son, also called Robert, succeeded his grandfather in the baronetcy. Sir Robert's second marriage was to Lady Penelope Egerton, daughter of John Egerton, 1st Earl of Bridgewater, and by her had two other sons and one daughter. He settled his estate on these two sons, of whom the eldest, John, eventually inherited the baronetcy after the failure of the senior line.

Parliament of England
Preceded by Sir Francis Nethersole; Sir Peter Osborne	Member of Parliament for Corfe Castle; 1625–1626; With: Edward Dackombe	Succeeded by Sir Francis Nethersole; Giles Green
Preceded by Arthur Pyne; Giles Green; Bernard Michell; Sir John Strangways	Member of Parliament for Weymouth and Melcombe Regis; 1628–1629; With: Hugh Pyne; Lewis Dyve; Henry Waltham	Parliament suspended until 1640
Preceded by David Cecil; William FitzWilliam	Member of Parliament for Peterborough; 1641–1648; With: William FitzWilliam	Unrepresented in the Rump Parliament
Baronetage of England
Preceded by Robert Napier	Baronet (of Luton Hoo); 1637–1661	Succeeded by Robert Napier
