= Cadeleigh =

Village in Devon, England

Coordinates: 50.85°N 03.55°W

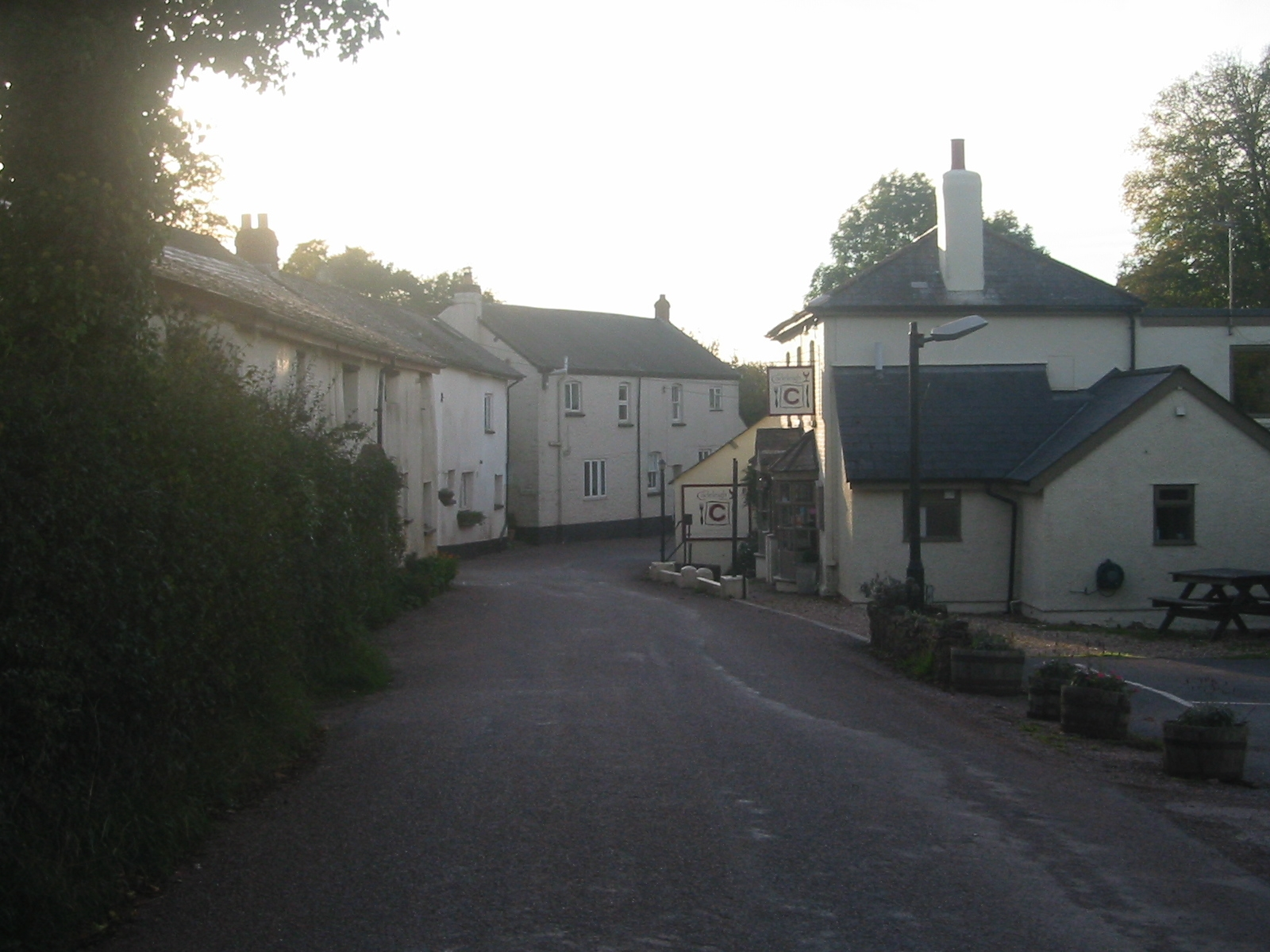
- The centre of Cadeleigh village.

- Location within Devon
- OS grid reference: SS9107
- District: Mid Devon
- Shire county: Devon
- Region: South West
- Country: England
- Sovereign state: United Kingdom
- Post town: TIVERTON
- Postcode district: EX16
- Dialling code: 01884
- Police: Devon and Cornwall
- Fire: Devon and Somerset
- Ambulance: South Western
- UK Parliament: Central Devon

Cadeleigh is a small village and civil parish in the county of Devon in England. It sits in the hills above the valley of the River Exe and is about 15 km (9 miles) north of Exeter and 6 km (4 miles) southwest of Tiverton.

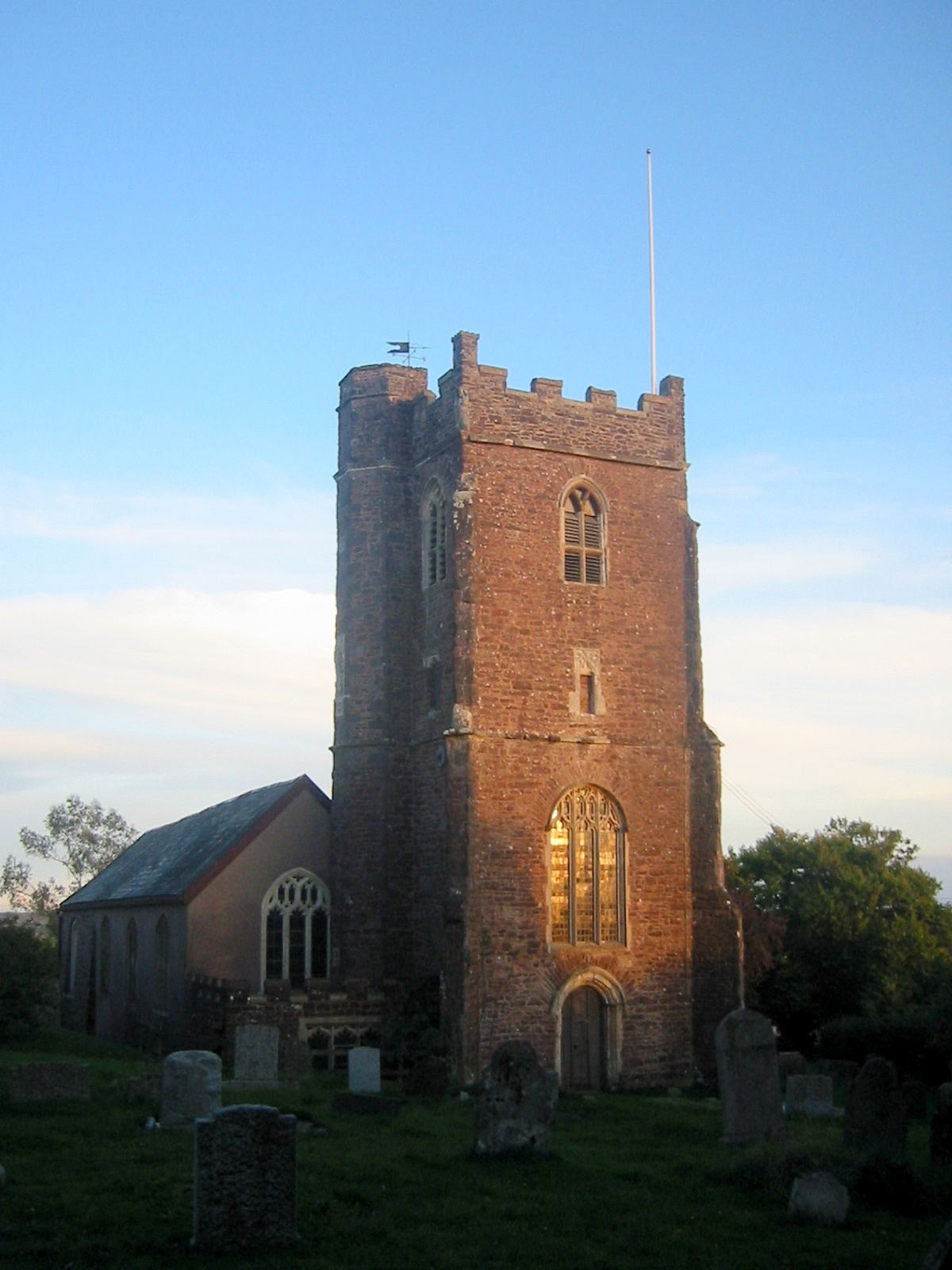
St. Bartholomew's Church, Cadeleigh.

The village has a church that is dedicated to St. Bartholomew and dates from the early part of the 15th century, although this is probably a rebuilding of a much older 12th-century church. It contains the monument of Sir Simon Leach (1567–1638), Sheriff of Devon in 1624, the largest of its type in any Devon parish church.

There is a single public house in Cadeleigh, which is called the Cadeleigh Arms.

Between 1885 and 1963 Cadeleigh also had a railway station, although it was actually located much closer to the nearby village of Bickleigh (in fact, the railway station was named "Cadeleigh and Bickleigh" before 1906).
