= List of places in Orkney =

Map of places in Orkney compiled from this list
See the list of places in Scotland for places in other counties.

Orkney is an archipelago located in the Northern Isles of Scotland. Having been inhabited for nearly 8,500 years, Orkney contains many settlements, hamlet and villages.

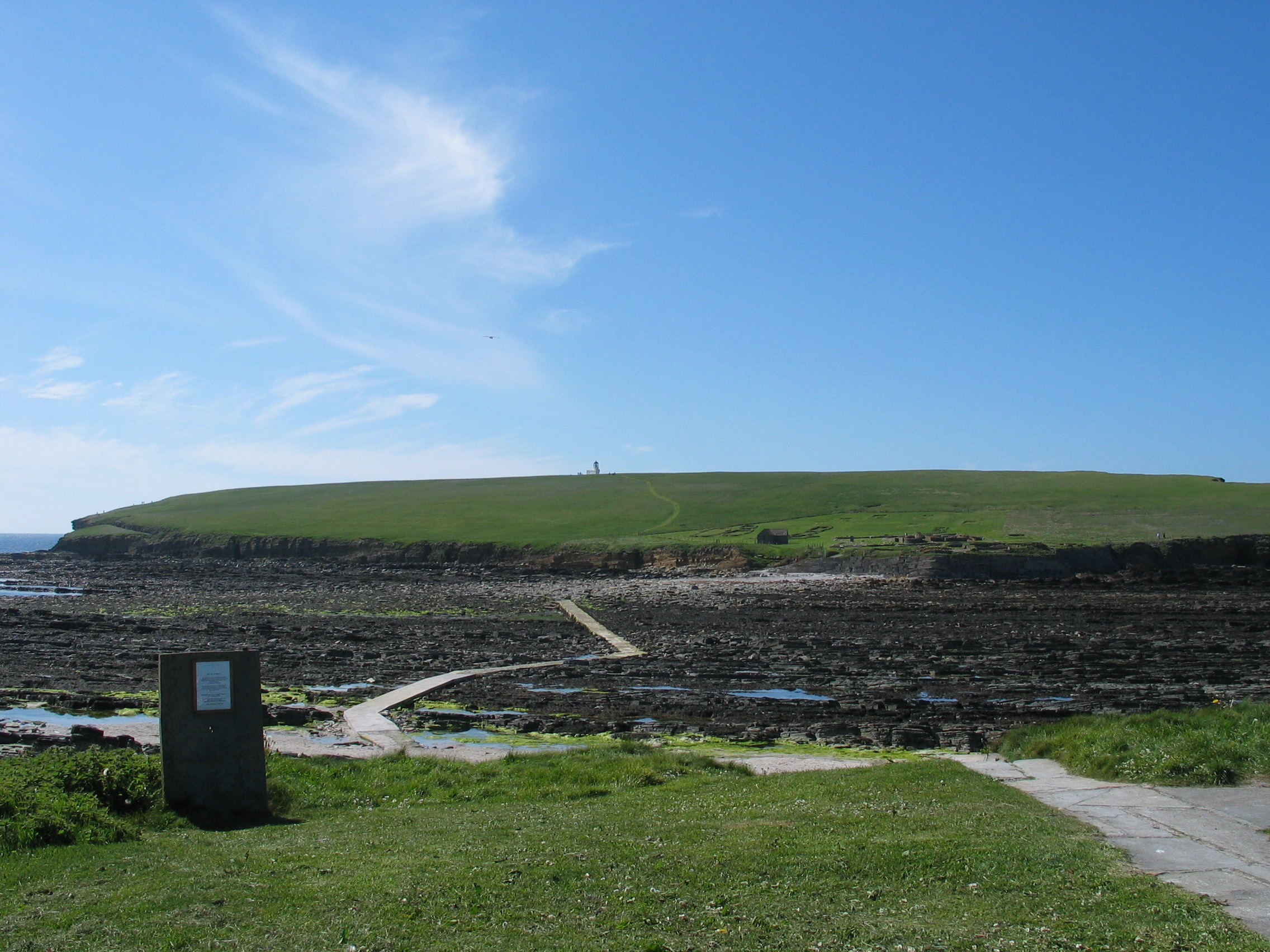
Brough of Birsay

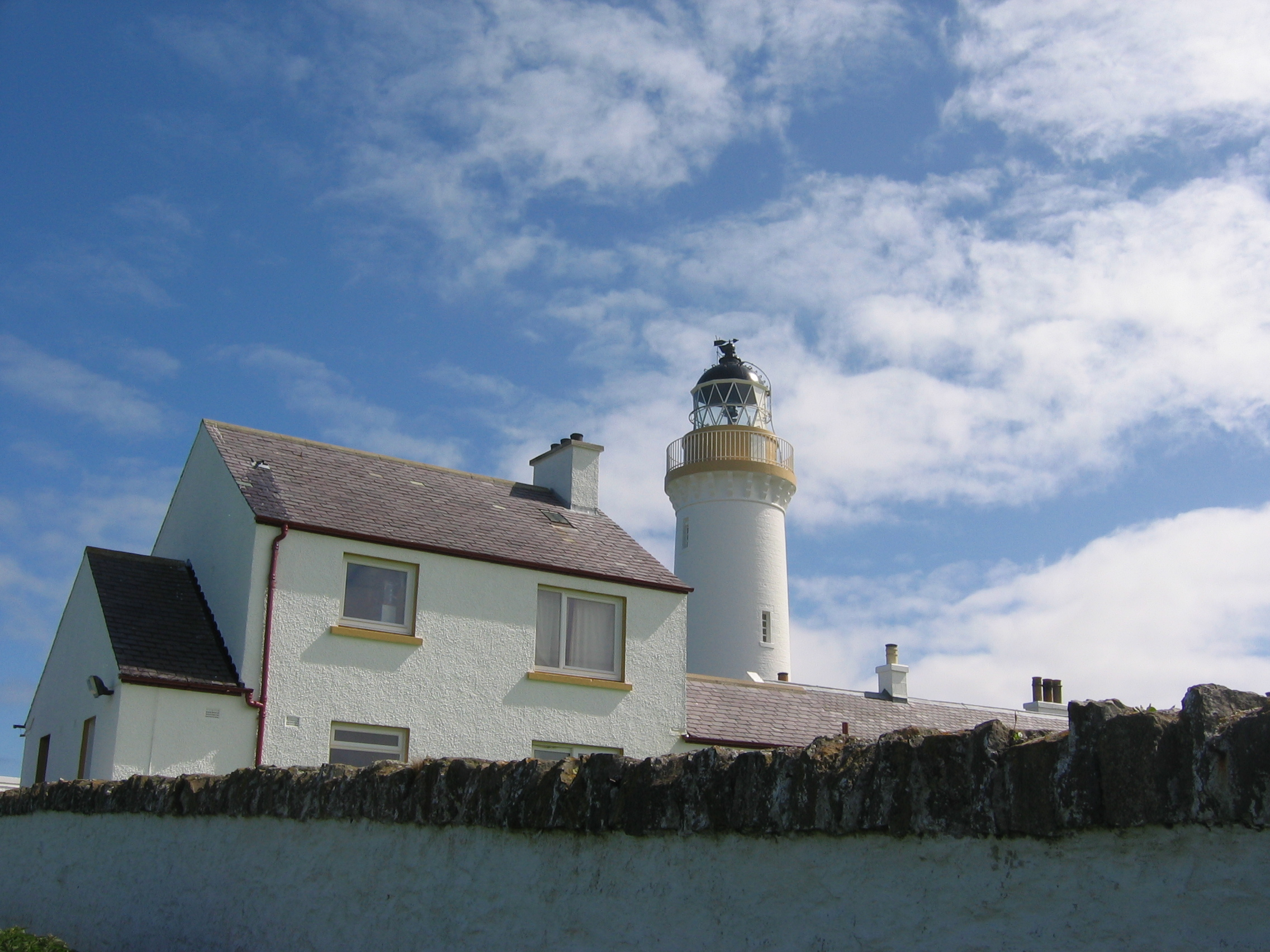
Cantick Head Lighthouse

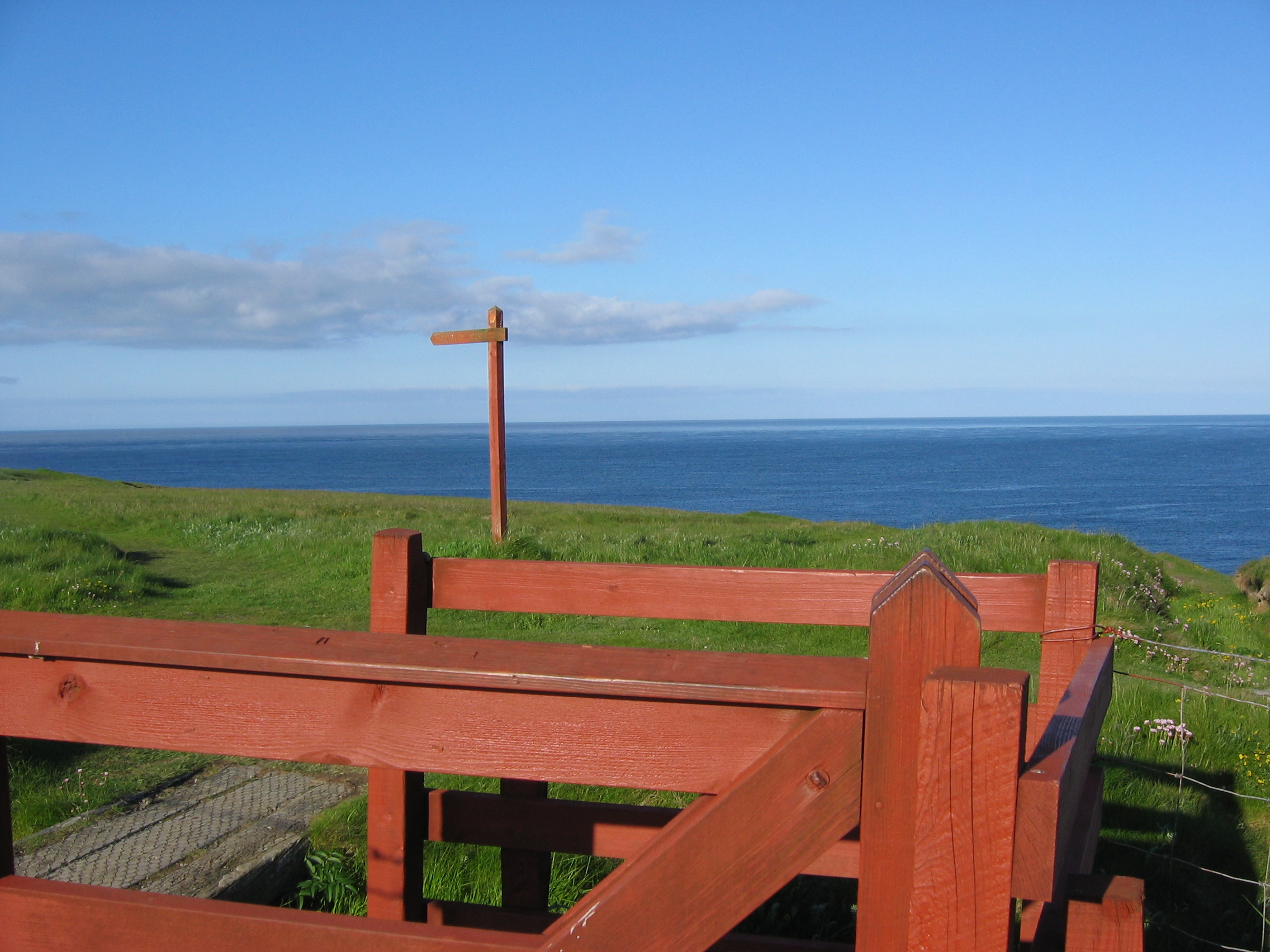
Deerness signpost

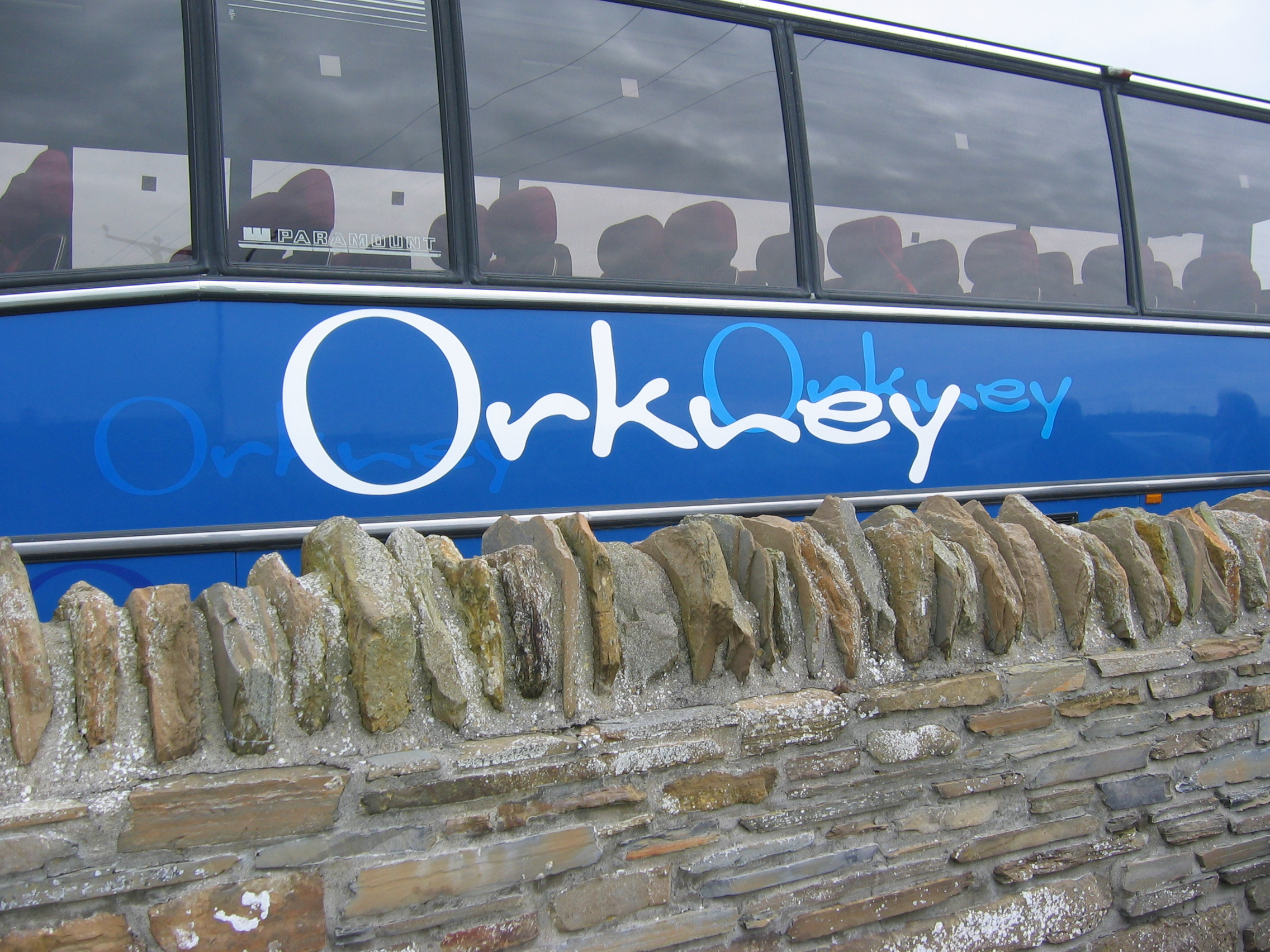
Orkney Tourist Bus

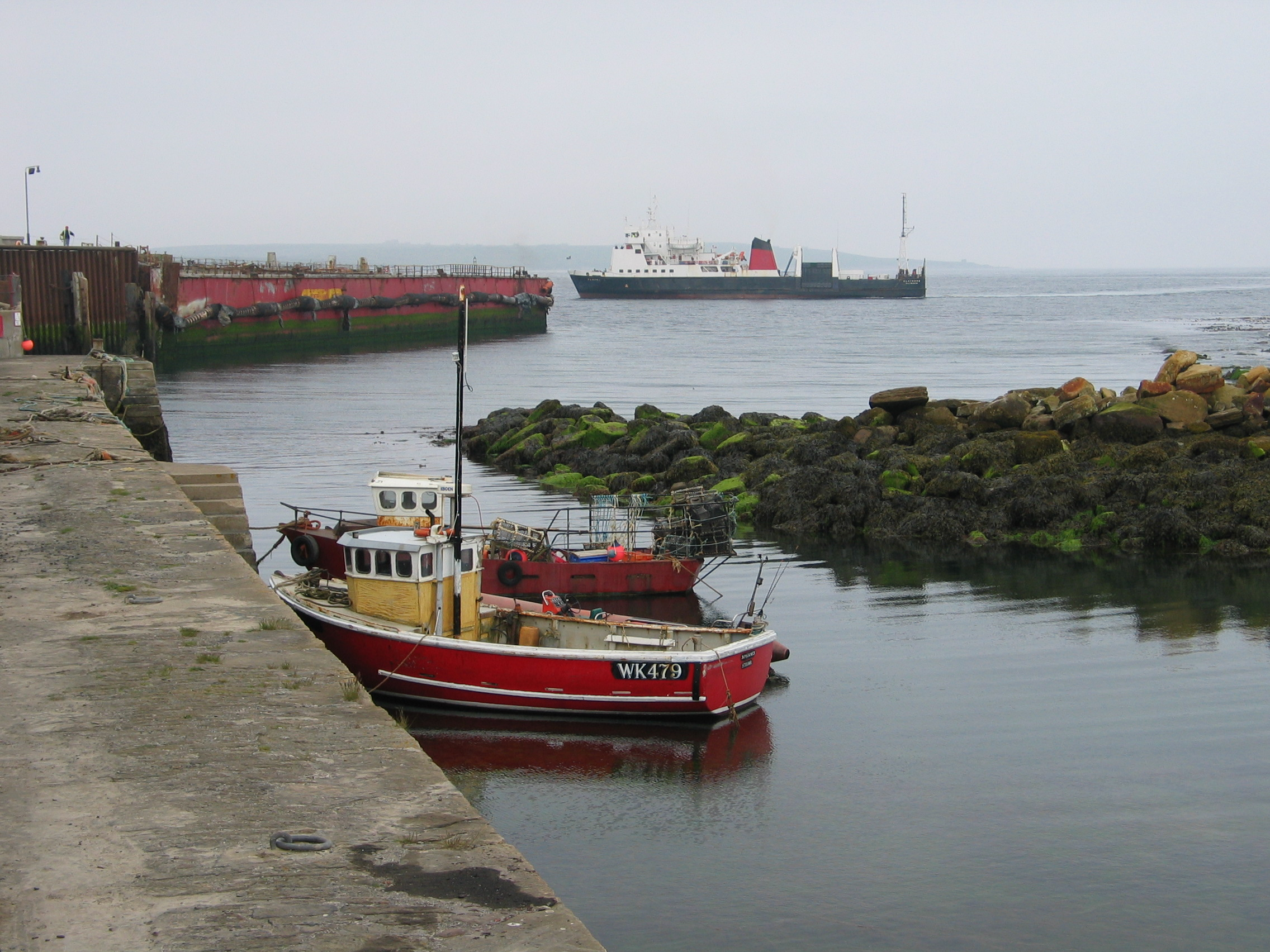
Gills Bay ferry and fishing boats

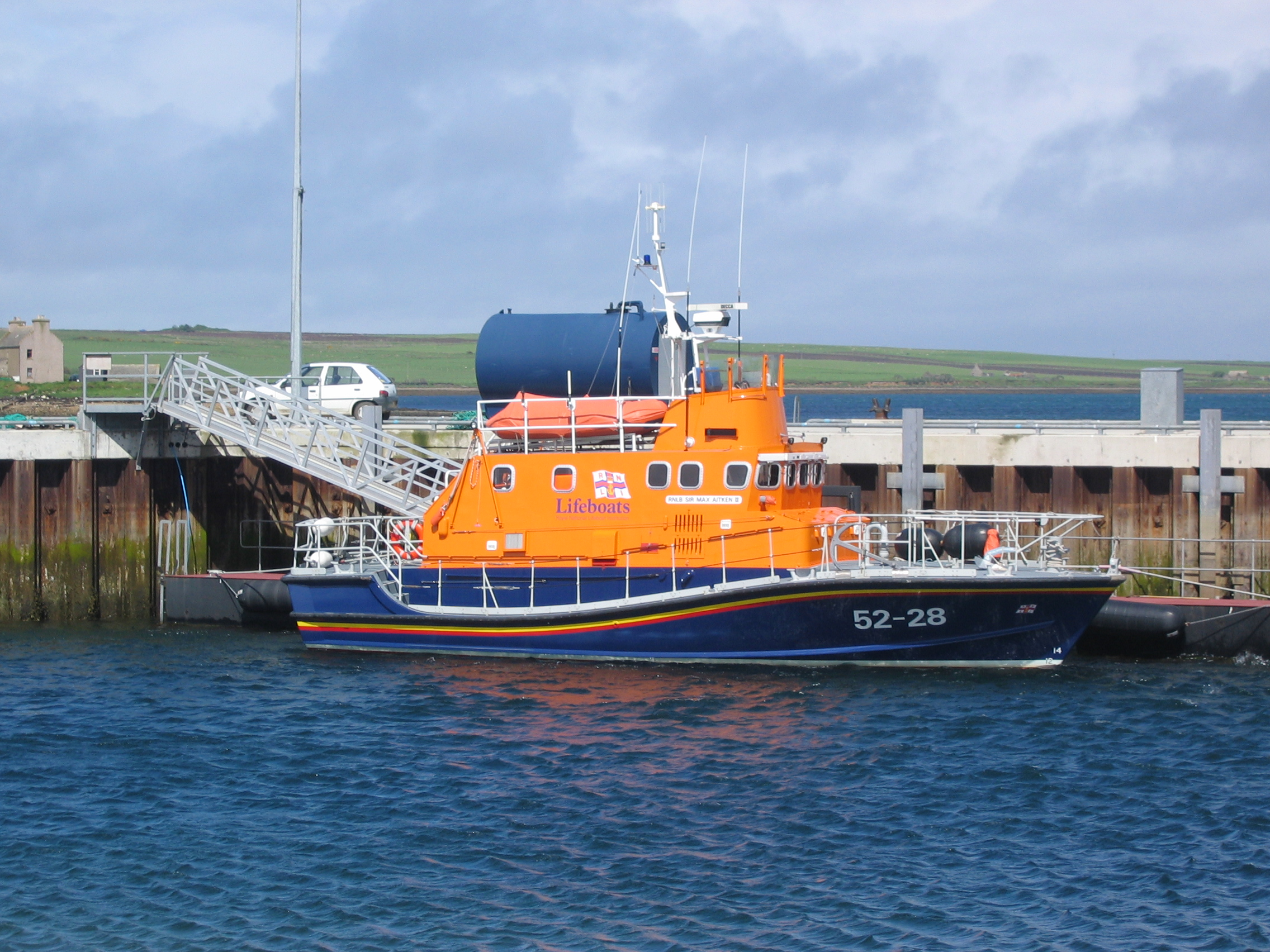
Longhope Lifeboat, Hoy

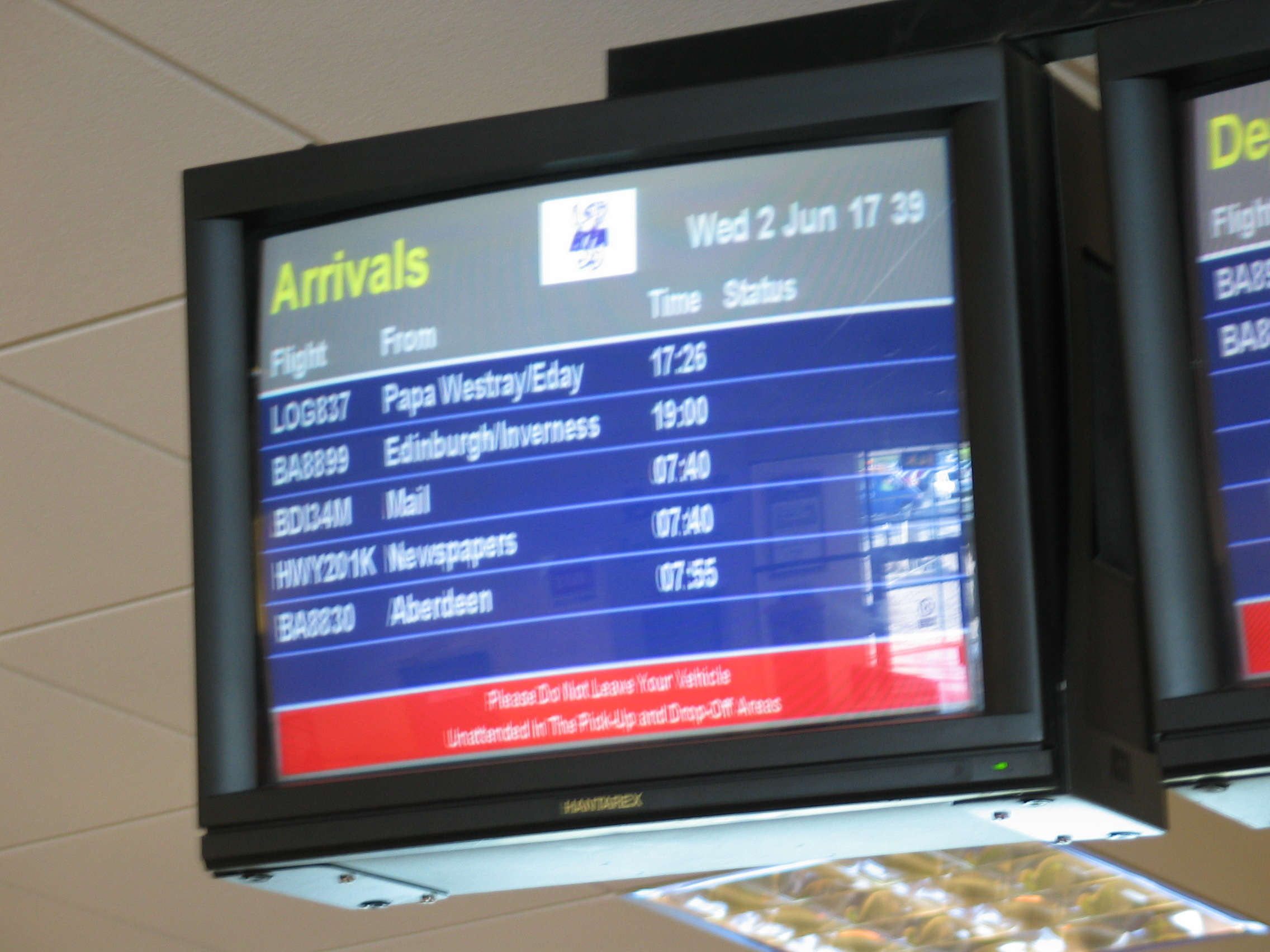
Kirkwall Airport lounge

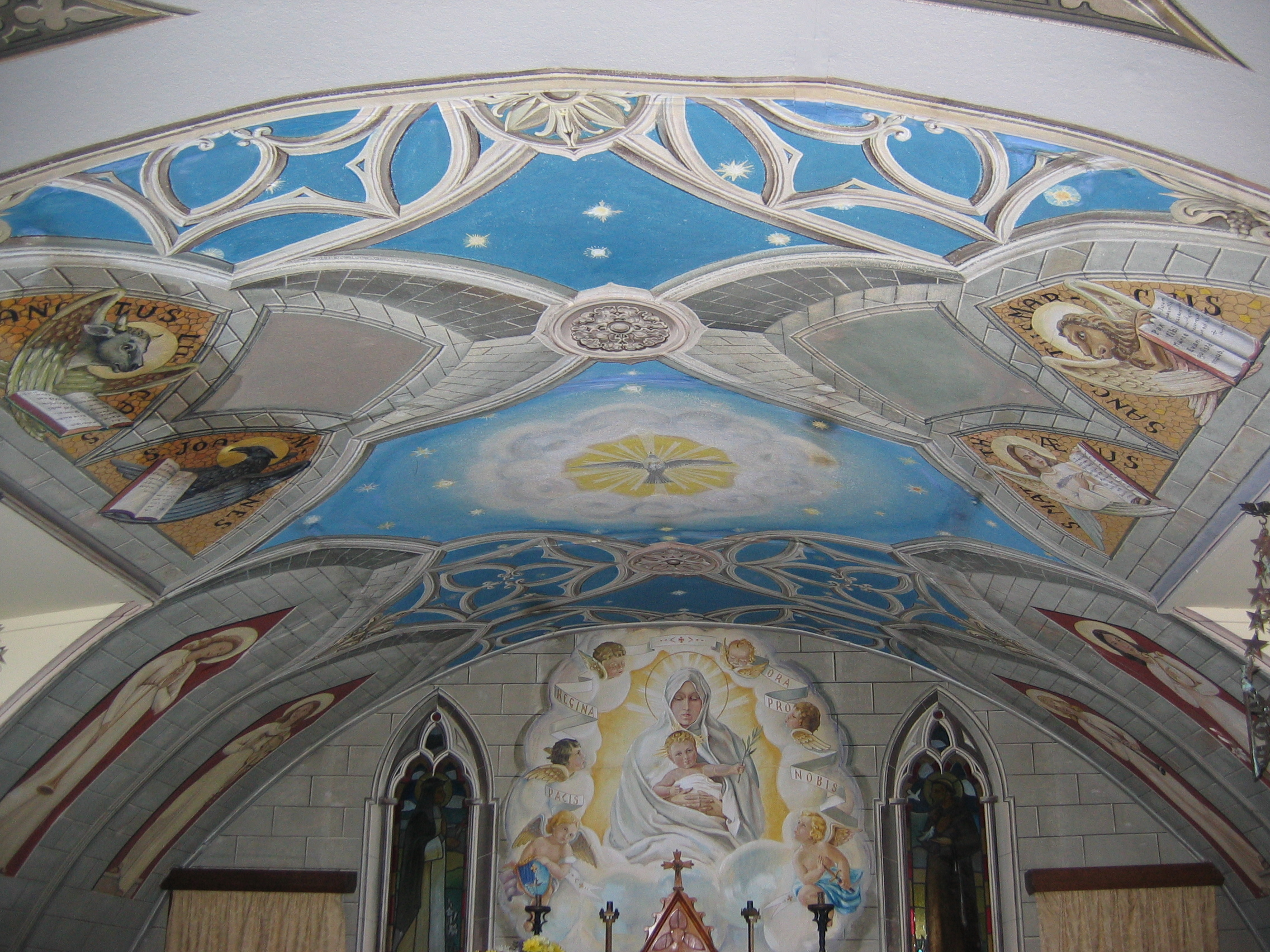
Lamb Holm, Italian Chapel

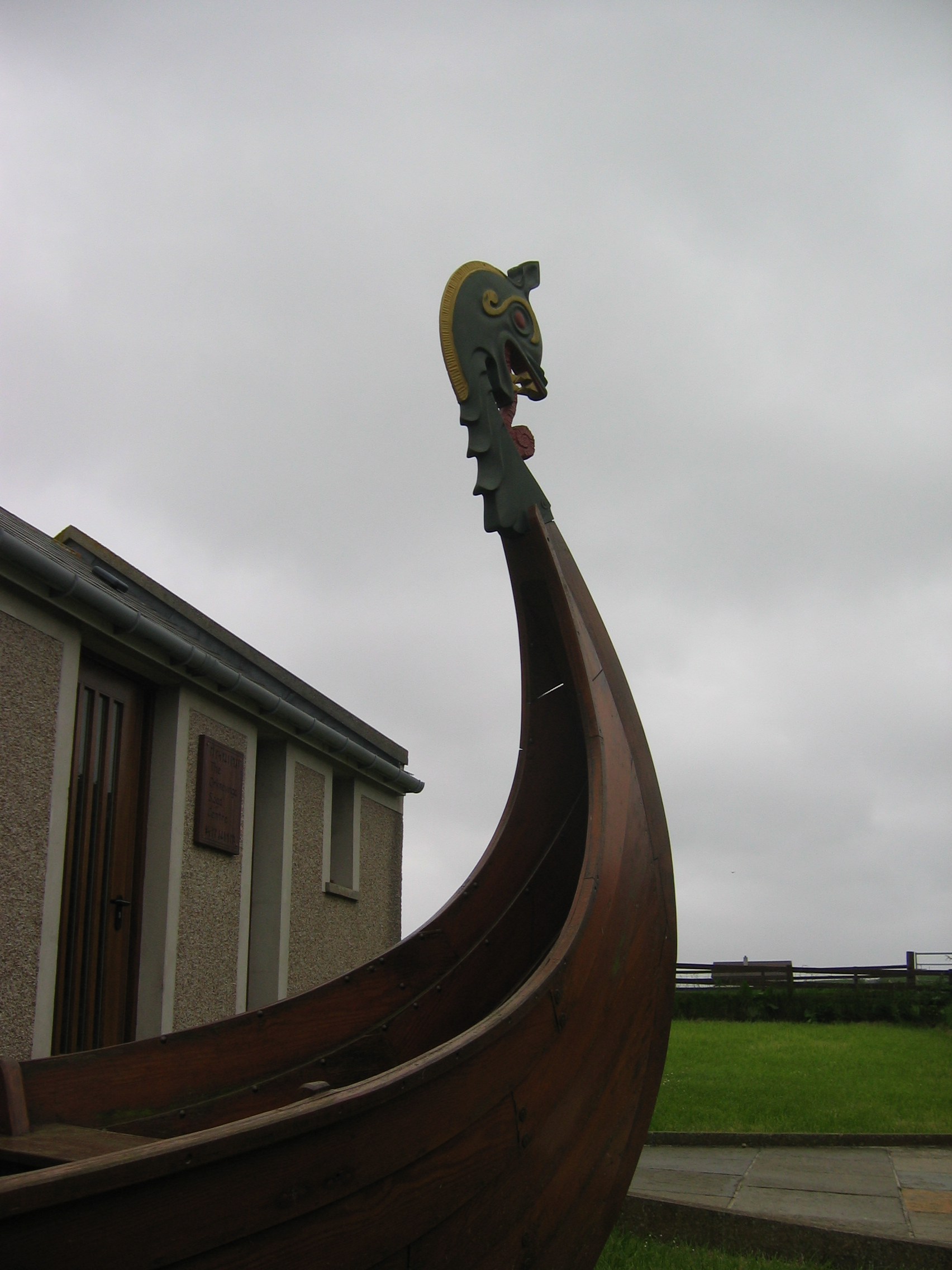
Orphir, Viking ship

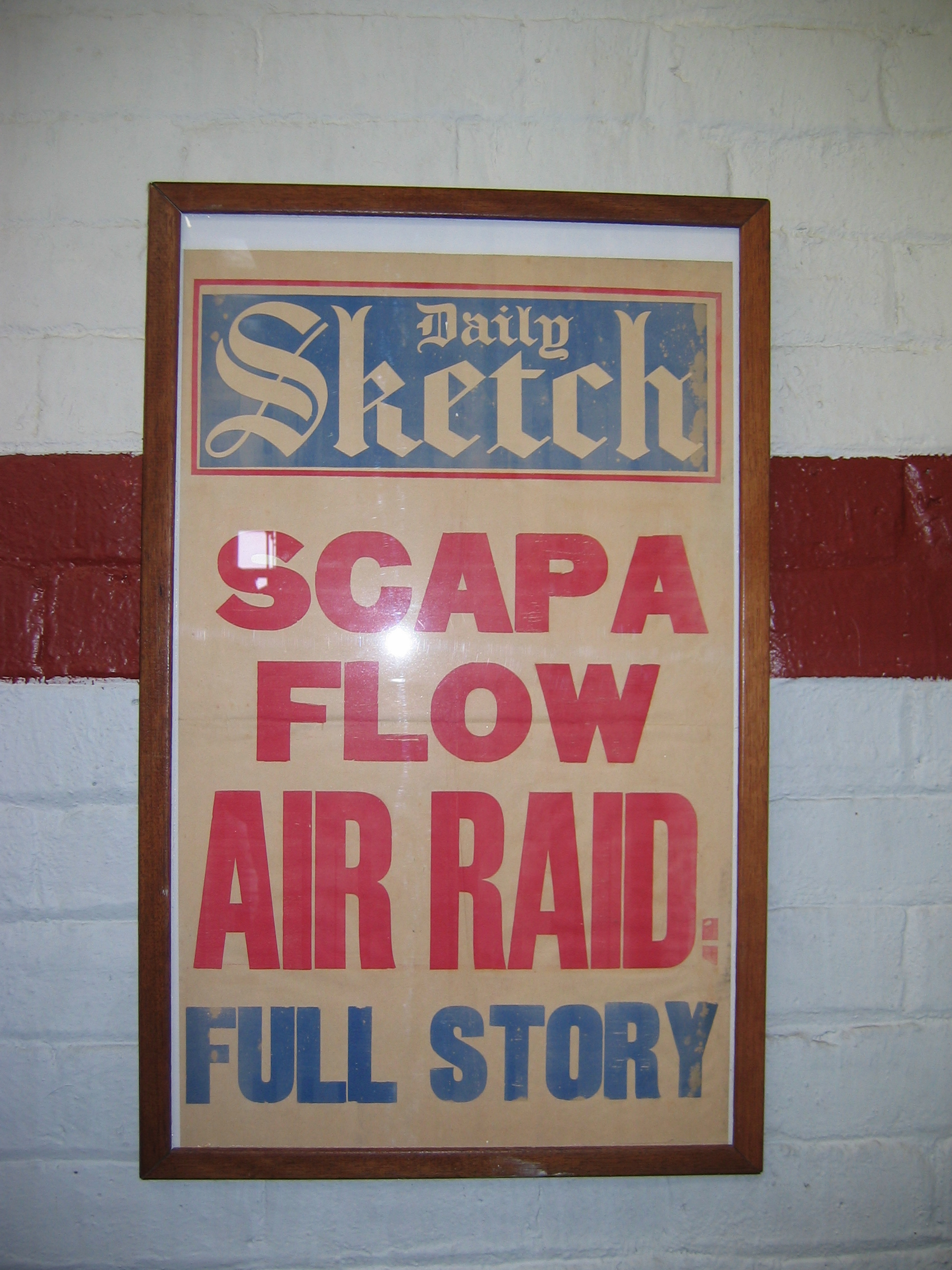
Scapa Flow Museum

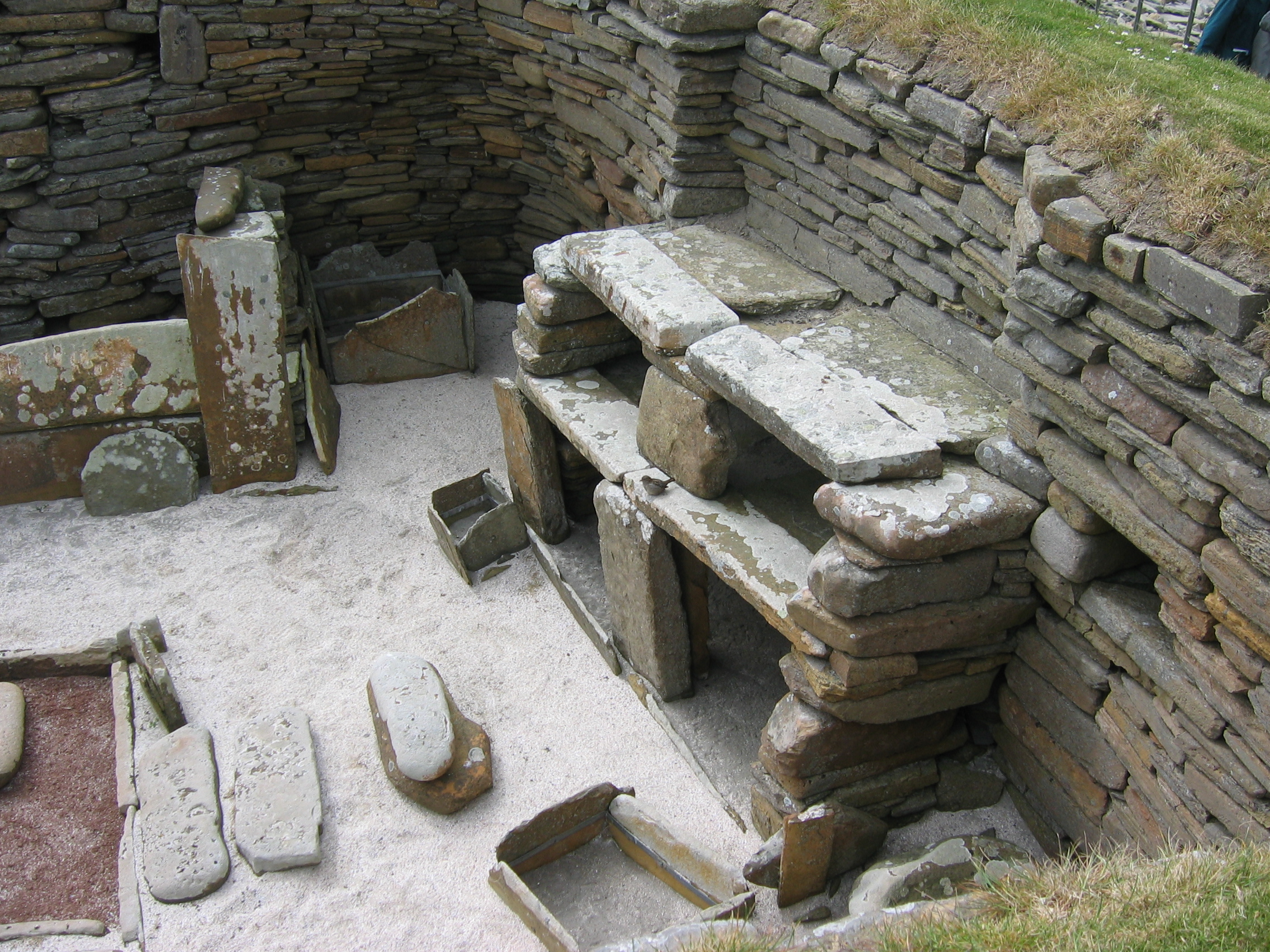
Skara Brae Neolithic Settlement

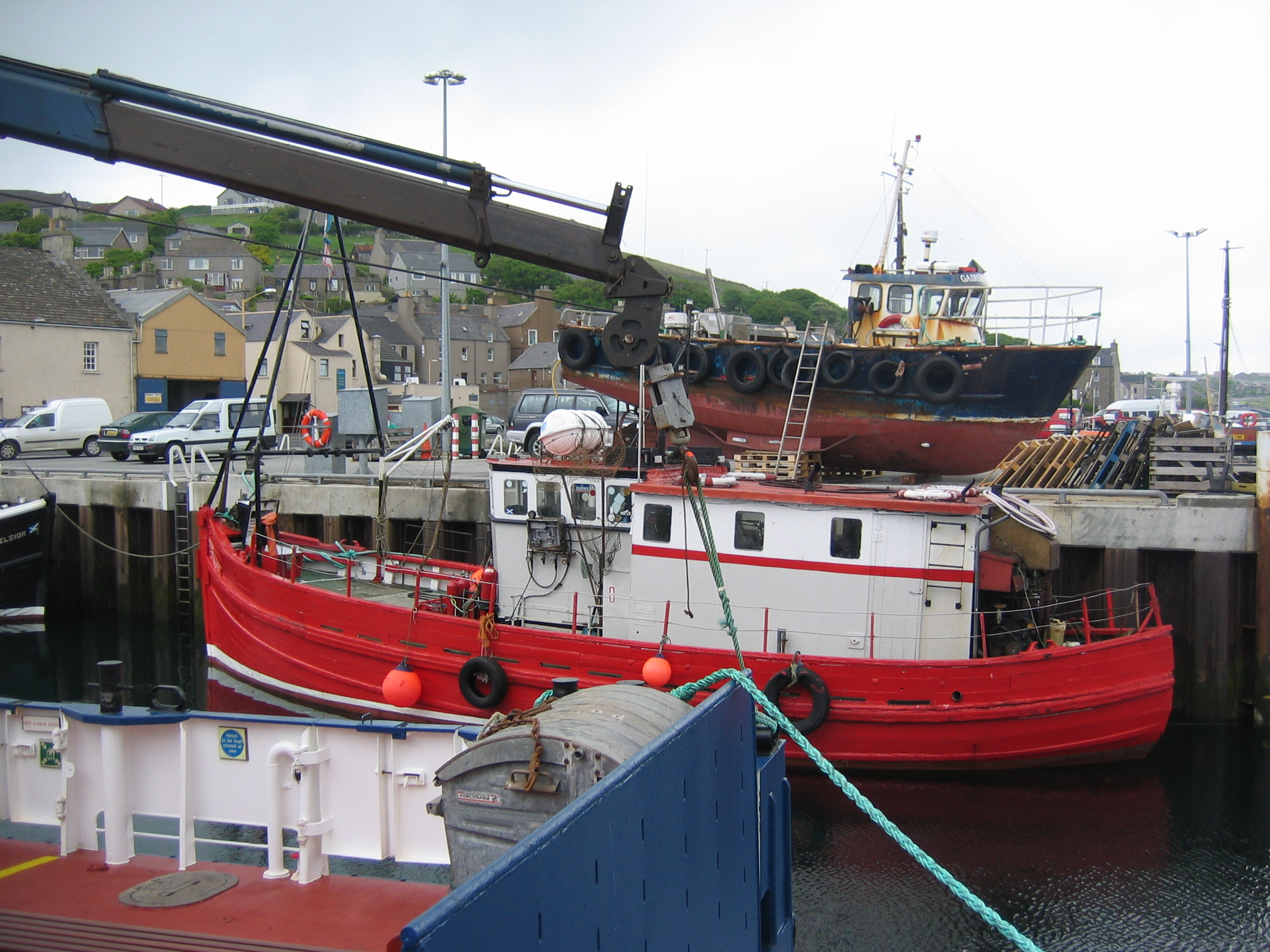
Stromness Harbour, Orkney

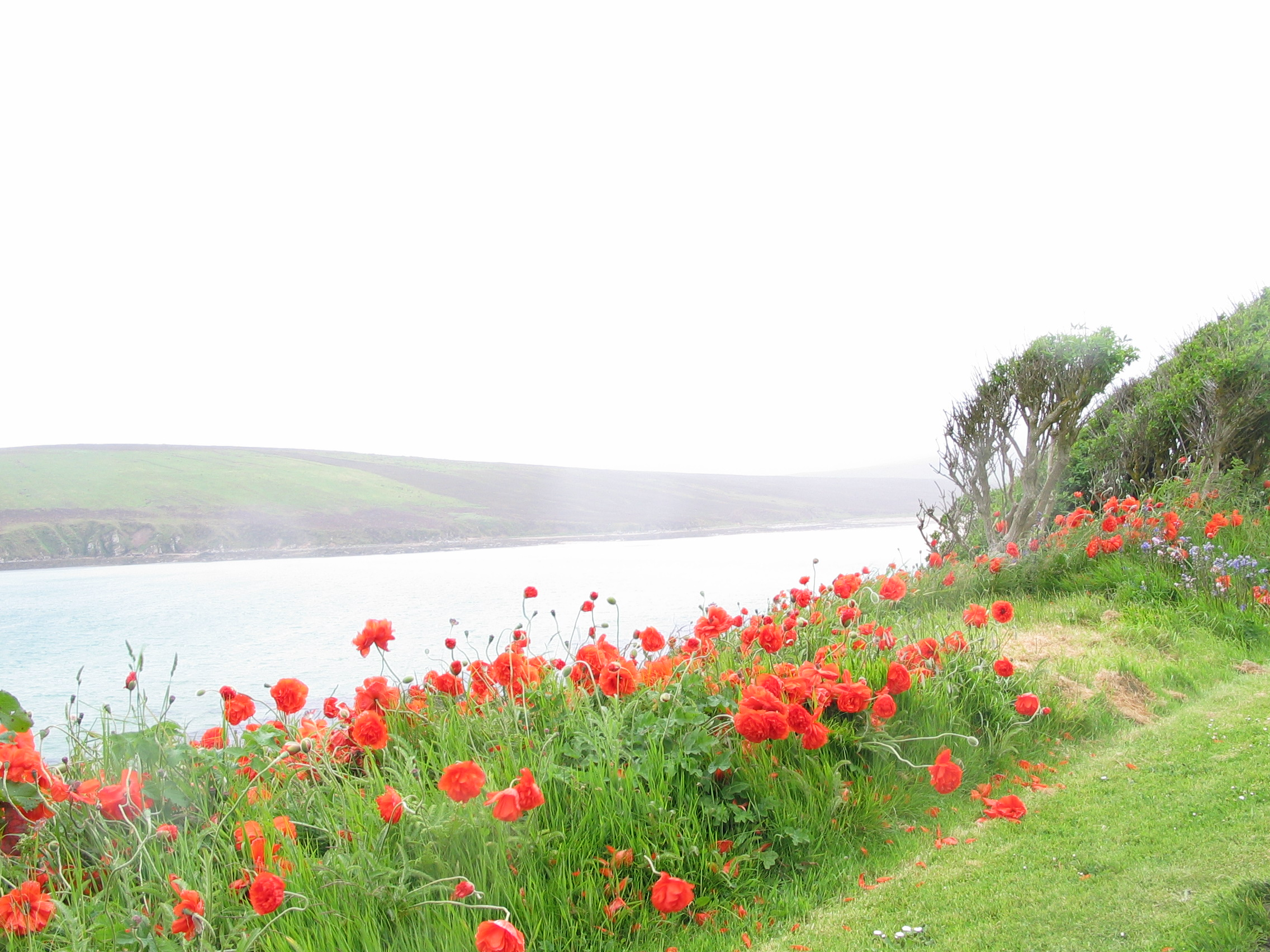
Waukmill Bay poppies

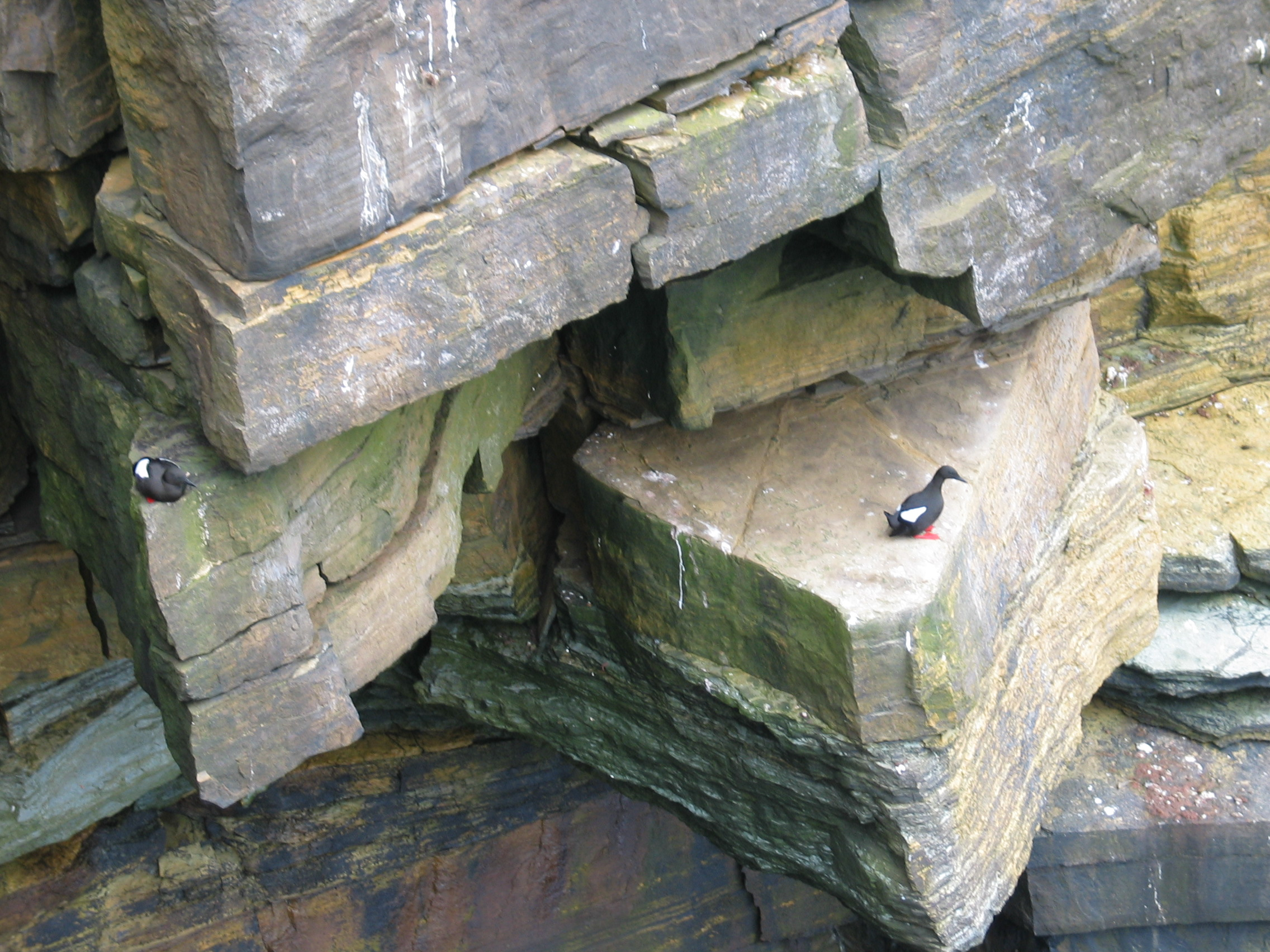
Yesnaby Black guillemots

== A ==
- Abune-the-hill
- Aikerness
- Aikers
- Aith

== B ==
- Backaland
- Backaskaill
- Balfour
- Beaquoy
- Berstane
- Bimbister
- Birsay
- Boloquoy
- Bow
- Braehead, Orkney
- Braeswick
- Breckquoy
- Brims
- Brinian
- Brinkie's Brae
- Brinyan
- Brough of Birsay
- Broughton
- Broughtown
- Burness
- Burray
- Burwick
- Bustatown

== C ==
- Calfsound
- Cantick Head
- Cleat
- Clestrain
- Clouston
- Cornquoy
- Costa

== D ==
- Deerness
- Dishes
- Dounby

== E ==
- Easting
- Eastside
- Eday
- Edmonstone
- Egilsay
- Elwick
- Everbay
- Evie

== F ==
- Finstown
- Firth
- Flotta
- Foubister

== G ==
- Georth
- Gills Bay
- Gorseness
- Graemsay
- Greenigo
- Grim Ness
- Grimbister
- Gritley
- Grobister
- Guith
- Gyre

== H ==
- Hackland
- Hackness
- Halcro
- Hamnavoe
- Harray
- Hatston
- Heddle
- Herston
- Hobbister
- Holland
- Hollandstoun
- Holm
- Housebay
- Houton
- Hoxa
- Hoy
- Hrossey
- Hurliness

== I ==
- Innertown
- Ireland
- Isbister

== K ==
- Kettletoft
- Kirbister
- Kirbuster
- Kirkwall
- Knarston

== L ==
- Lady
- Lamb Holm
- Laminess
- Langskaill
- Liddle; see Liddle Burnt Mound
- Linklater
- Linklet
- Linksness
- Longhope
- Loth
- Lower Whitehall
- Lowertown
- Lyness
- Lythes

== M ==
- Maeshowe
- Mainland
- Manse Bay
- Marwick
- Melsetter
- Midbea
- Midhowe
- Millbounds
- Mirbister
- Murra, Orkney

== N ==
- Navershaw
- Ness of Tenston
- Nesstoun
- Nether Button
- Netherbrough
- Newark
- Newbigging
- North Dawn
- North Ronaldsay
- Northdyke
- Northtown
- Nouster

== O ==
- Odie
- Orphir
- Outertown
- Overbister

== P ==
- Pan
- Papa Westray
- Papley
- Pierowall

== Q ==
- Quholm
- Quindry
- Quoyloo
- Quoyness

== R ==
- Rackwick
- Rapness
- Redland
- Rendall
- Rinnigill
- Roadside
- Ronaldsvoe
- Rothiesholm
- Rousay
- Russland

== S ==
- Sabiston
- Saltness
- Samsonslane
- Sanday
- Sandgarth
- Sandquoy
- Sandwick
- Saviskaill
- Scapa
- Scar
- Scarwell
- Settiscarth
- Shapinsay
- Skaill
- Skara Brae
- Skeabrae
- Skelwick
- Sourin
- South Ronaldsay
- Southtown
- St Margaret's Hope
- St Mary's
- St Ola
- Stenness
- Stove
- Stromness
- Stronsay
- Swanbister
- Swannay

== T ==
- Tankerness
- Tingwall
- Toab
- Tradespark
- Twatt

== U ==
- Upper Sanday
- Uppertown

== V ==
- Veness
- Voy

== W ==
- Warbeth
- Wasbister
- Westness
- Westray
- Whitehall
- Widewall
- Woodwick
- Work
- Wyre

== Y ==
- Yesnaby

== See also ==
- List of places in Scotland
- List of islands of Scotland
- List of Orkney islands
