= Orcadians =

Ethnic group

Total population
- 21,349 currently resident population of Orkney

Regions with significant populations
- Mainland, Orkney: 17,162
- South Ronaldsay: 909
- Westray: 588

Languages
- Orcadian (Scots), Scottish English; historically Norn

Religion
- Presbyterianism

Related ethnic groups
- Shetlanders, Norwegians, Faroese, Icelanders

Orcadians, also known as Orkneymen, are an ethnic group native to the Orkney Islands, who speak an Orcadian dialect of the Scots language, a West Germanic language, and share a common history, culture and ancestry. Speaking Norn, a native North Germanic language into the 19th or 20th century, Orcadians descend significantly from North Germanic peoples, with around a third of their ancestry derived from Scandinavia, including a majority of their patrilineal line. According to anthropological study, the Orcadian ethnic composition is similar to that of Icelandic people; a comparable islander ethnicity of North Germanic origin.

Historically, they are also descended from the Picts, (Note: Ritchie notes the presence of an Orcadian ruler at the court of a Pictish high king at Inverness in 565 AD.) Norse, and Lowland Scots.

== Background ==
=== Orcadian ethnic group formation ===
An Orcadian ethnicity has developed since around 900 AD. Goethe University's historian, Daniel Föller, describes the Orcadian ethnic group's early ethnogenesis occurring between the 10th and 12th centuries, during the same period in which the Swedish, Norwegian, Danish, and Manx ethnicities emerged. According to historian James Hunter, the "ethnic composition" of Orcadians was then significantly impacted by colonisation from Lowland Scots people between 1494 and 1659.

Anthropologist Agnar Helgason's research in 2001 found that the mtDNA ancestry of Orcadians is around 36 percent "Scandinavian", suggesting an ethnic composition comparable to Icelanders, a modern North Germanic ethnic group. 2003 research found that the majority of Orcadians can trace their patrilineality to Scandinavia, with 55% of Y chromosome DNA relating to migrating North Germanic peoples. In research analysing different European ethnic groups, physician Lars Klareskog and geneticist Peter K. Gregersen have compared the Orcadian ethnicity in relation to other European island-based ethnicities, such as Sardinian people.

=== Orcadian identity, governance, and nationalism ===
Orcadians have a range of ethnic or national identities, including Orcadian, Scottish, and British. Swedish artist, Gunnie Moberg, suggests that within the Orkney Islands, "People are Orcadian first, then Scots or British". Historian Hugh Kearney has written that Orkney's historical connection with the North Sea Empire has allowed Orcadians to remain "ethnically distinctive". With regards to self-governance, Laurentian University's historian Daniel Travers has written that Orkney Islands Council has "considerably more influence over insular matters than other counties" in the United Kingdom.

Researcher, James B. Minahan, has described the Orcadian people as a stateless nation, noting their history of seeking independence from Scotland, their opposition to the 1979 Scottish devolution referendum, and a history of seeking "political status that the Channel Islands, the Isle of Man, and the Faroese Islands" have in relationship with the sovereign states of the UK and Denmark, respectively.

=== Colonial era migration ===
During the colonial era, Orcadians have been documented migrating in search of opportunity. York University historian, Carolyn Podruchny, notes that "freemen" (as opposed to "voyageurs"), involved in the North American fur trade up until the early 19th-century came from a range of disparate ethnic groups and "could be métis, Orcadians, other Scots, English, and Iroquoians from the St. Lawrence valley". Emigrants to London and York, England, also found inland posts related to the fur trade. According to ethnohistorian Jennifer S. H. Brown, "at least twenty-eight Orkneymen became either governors, chief factors, chief traders, or district master between the early 1700s and the mid-1800s".

== Notable Orcadians ==
- Jim Baikie (1940–2017), Scottish comics artist, who is best known for his work with Alan Moore on Skizz
- William Balfour Baikie (1825–1864), explorer and naturalist
- George Mackay Brown (1921–1996), poet, author, playwright
- Kate Brown (b. 1960), 38th governor of Oregon, of partial Orcadian descent
- Mary Brunton (1778–1818), author of Self-Control, Discipline, and other novels
- Dr. David Clouston (1871–1948), author and agriculturalist
- J. Storer Clouston (1870–1944), author and historian
- Thomas Clouston (1840–1915), psychiatrist, Superintendent of the Royal Edinburgh Asylum
- James Copland (1791–1870), physician and prolific medical writer
- Stanley Cursiter (1887–1976), artist
- William Towrie Cutt (1898–1981), author
- Walter Traill Dennison (1826–1894), Orcadian folklorist
- Kris Drever (b. 1978), folk singer and guitarist
- Magnus Erlendsson (Saint Magnus) (c. 1070–1117), Earl of Orkney c. 1105–1117
- John Flett (geologist) (1869–1947) and his son William Roberts Flett FRSE (1900–1979) also a geologist
- Edgar (Gary) Matheson Gibson (1934-2023), Teacher, Artist, Public Figure and Ba Maker
- Matthew Forster Heddle (1828–1897), geologist, author of The Mineralogy of Scotland
- Colonel Henry Halcro Johnston (1856–1939), botanist, physician, rugby union international and Deputy Lieutenant for Orkney
- Lt.Col. James Johnston (1724–1800), early and principal Scottish merchant at Quebec following the fall of New France
- Malcolm Laing (1762–1818), author of the History of Scotland from the Union of the Crowns to the Union of the Kingdoms
- Samuel Laing (1780–1868), author of A Residence in Norway, and translator of the Heimskringla, the Icelandic chronicle of the kings of Norway
- Samuel Laing (1812–1897), chairman of the London, Brighton & South Coast railway, and introducer of the system of "parliamentary" trains with fares of one penny a mile.
- Kristin Linklater (1946-2020), voice teacher, actor, director and author
- Magnus Linklater (b. 1942), journalist, son of Eric Linklater
- John D. Mackay (1909–1970), headmaster and Orkney patriot
- Ernest Marwick (1915–1977), a writer noted for his writings on Orkney folklore and history
- Murdoch McKenzie (d. 1797), hydrographer
- F. Marian McNeill (1885–1973) folklorist, best known for writing The Silver Bough
- Edwin Muir (1887–1959), author and poet
- Dr. John Rae (1813–1893), Arctic explorer
- Robert Rendall (1898–1967), poet, and amateur naturalist
- Rognvald Kali Kolsson (Saint Rognvald) (c. 1103–1158), Earl of Orkney 1136–1158
- Henry I Sinclair, Earl of Orkney (c. 1345–1400), Earl of Orkney
- Julyan Sinclair, television presenter
- Bessie Skea a.k.a. Bessie Grieve (1923–1996), writer of prose and poetry about nature and Orkney life
- Thomas Stewart Traill (1781–1862), professor of medical jurisprudence at the University of Edinburgh and editor of the 8th edition of the Encyclopædia Britannica
- Cameron Stout (b. 1971) winner of Big Brother in 2003, brother of Julyan Sinclair
- Margaret Tait (1918–1999), filmmaker and poet
- Thorbjorn Thorsteinsson (d. 1158), known as Thorbjorn the Clerk, Viking
- James Wallace (fl. 1684–1724), physician and botanist
- William Walls (1819–1893), lawyer and industrialist
- Thomas Webster (1772–1844), geologist and architect
- Sylvia Wishart (1936–2008), landscape artist
- Jennifer and Hazel Wrigley (b. c. 1970) folk musicians

== People associated with Orkney ==
- Rev. Matthew Armour (1820–1903), Sanday's radical Free Kirk Minister
- Sweyn Asleifsson or Sveinn Ásleifarson (c. 1115–1171), Viking, born in Caithness, who appears in the Orkneyinga Saga
- V. Gordon Childe (1892–1957), Australian archaeologist and philologist who excavated Maeshowe
- Sir Peter Maxwell Davies (1934–2016), composer and Master of the Queen's Music
- Robert Frost (1874–1963) American poet (Note: Robert Frost's ancestors were Scotch-English. His mother was a Scottish emigrant who appears in most records as Isabelle Moody (Moodie); her family was from Orkney.)
- John Gow (c. 1698–1725), a notorious pirate
- Andrew Greig (b. 1951), writer
- Jo Grimond (1913–1993), Liberal Party leader and MP for Orkney and Shetland 1950–1983
- David Harvey (b. 1948), footballer
- Ingibiorg Finnsdottir (d. c. 1069), wife of Thorfinn the Mighty, mother of Paul and Erlend Thorfinnsson, subsequently queen of Scotland
- Eric Linklater (1899–1974), novelist, playwright, journalist, essayist and poet
- Margaret, Maid of Norway (1283–1290, Orkney), Queen of Scots and a Norwegian princess
- Robert Shaw (1927–1978), English actor and novelist
- William Sichel (b. 1951), ultra distance runner
- Luke Sutherland (b. 1971), writer of novels Jelly Roll, Sweetmeat, and Venus as a Boy
- Jim Wallace, Baron Wallace of Tankerness (b. 1954), former MP for Orkney and Shetland (1983–2001), MSP for Orkney (1999–2007), Deputy First Minister of Scotland and leader of the Scottish Liberal Democrats

== See also ==
- Earldom of Orkney
- Prehistoric Orkney, for the ancient Orcadians
