= Bimbister =

Coordinates: 59.031°N 3.179°W

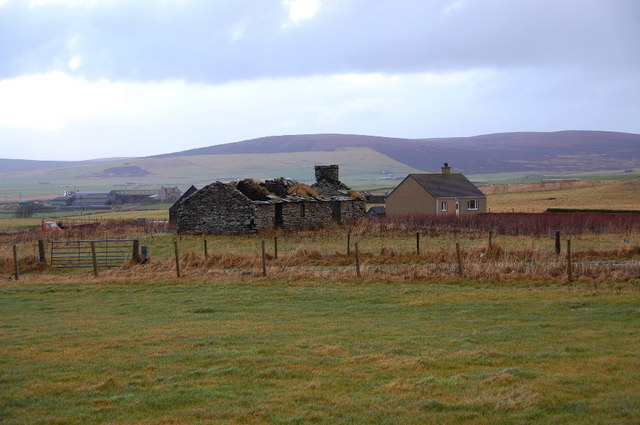
- A new house and former croft at Bimbister

- Location within Orkney
- OS grid reference: HY323165
- Civil parish: Birsay and Harray
- Council area: Orkney
- Lieutenancy area: Orkney
- Country: Scotland
- Sovereign state: United Kingdom
- Post town: STROMNESS
- Postcode district: KW16
- Dialling code: 01856
- Police: Scotland
- Fire: Scottish
- Ambulance: Scottish
- UK Parliament: Orkney and Shetland
- Scottish Parliament: Orkney

Bimbister is a village on the Orkney Islands, Scotland. The A986 is the main road through the village. The Bronze Age cemetery, the Knowes of Trotty, which includes twelve surviving burial mounds, lies to the east of the village. Bimbister is within the parish of Birsay and Harray.

== See also ==
- Knowes of Trotty
- Prehistoric Scotland
- Liddle Burnt Mound
