= List of listed buildings in Cross And Burness, Orkney =

This is a list of listed buildings in the parish of Cross and Burness in Orkney, Scotland.

== List ==
Name	Location	Date Listed	Grid Ref. (Note: Sometimes known as OSGB36, the grid reference (where provided) is based on the British national grid reference system used by the Ordnance Survey. • "Guide to National Grid". Ordnance Survey. • "Get-a-map". Ordnance Survey.)	Geo-coordinates	Notes	LB Number (Note: Historic Environment Scotland assign a unique alphanumeric identifier to each designated site in Scotland, for listed buildings this always begins with "LB", for example "LB12345".)	Image
North Ronaldsay, Holland House Steading, Factor's House And Bothy				59°21′50″N 2°25′52″W	Category C(S)	44588	Upload Photo
North Ronaldsay, Verracott				59°22′31″N 2°25′40″W	Category B	43853	Upload Photo
North Ronaldsay, Dennis Head Beacon, Including Remains Of Keepers' Houses				59°23′03″N 2°22′17″W	Category A	5891	Upload another image
North Ronaldsay, Versa Breck, North Ronaldsay Lighthouse, Including Keepers' Houses, Boundary Walls And Foghorn				59°23′22″N 2°22′53″W	Category B	5892	Upload Photo
North Ronaldsay, Holland House, Including Outbuildings, Garden Walls, Steading And Cottages				59°21′49″N 2°25′51″W	Category C(S)	5274	Upload Photo
North Ronaldsay, Gateside, Including Outbuildings				59°21′33″N 2°25′03″W	Category B	46393	Upload Photo
Sanday, Kettletoft, Kettletoft Pier, Including Slipway				59°13′52″N 2°35′55″W	Category B	46402	Upload Photo
Sanday, Cross, Warsetter Farm, Including Boundary Walls, Gatepiers And Ancillary Farm Courtyard With Threshing Barn				59°13′30″N 2°39′07″W	Category B	5905	Upload Photo
Sanday, Westove, Scar House, Including Ancillary Range With Mill And Doocot, Walled Garden And Farm Cottages				59°17′30″N 2°34′50″W	Category B	5908	Upload Photo
Sanday, Marygarth Manse With Ancillary Buildings Including Drying Kiln, Boundary Walls And Gatepiers				59°15′21″N 2°36′30″W	Category B	54	Upload Photo
Sanday, Stove Farmhouse And Farm Cottages				59°12′17″N 2°41′11″W	Category B	46404	Upload Photo
North Ronaldsay, New Church, (Former Uf Church)				59°22′14″N 2°25′40″W	Category B	45267	Upload Photo
North Ronaldsay, Peckhole Windmill				59°21′41″N 2°25′07″W	Category B	44589	Upload Photo
Sanday, Burness, Saville Farmhouse Including Ancillary Buildings				59°17′01″N 2°33′34″W	Category B	5909	Upload Photo
North Ronaldsay, Dennis Head, Fishing Station And Pier				59°23′04″N 2°22′39″W	Category C(S)	46392	Upload Photo
Sanday, Backaskaill Mains				59°14′21″N 2°37′46″W	Category B	46401	Upload Photo
Sanday, Cross, Warsetter Farm Cottages				59°13′39″N 2°38′49″W	Category B	46405	Upload Photo
North Ronaldsay, Old Kirk, (Formerly Free Church), Including Boundary Walls And Gatepiers				59°21′53″N 2°26′01″W	Category B	5273	Upload Photo
North Ronaldsay, Nouster				59°21′27″N 2°26′27″W	Category C(S)	46397	Upload Photo
Sanday, Cross, Warsetter Farm, Doocot				59°13′28″N 2°38′58″W	Category B	5906	Upload Photo
North Ronaldsay, Lurand, Including Boundary Walls And Outbuildings				59°21′30″N 2°26′45″W	Category C(S)	46394	Upload Photo
Sanday, Boloquoy Farm, Including Boundary Walls, Ancillary Buildings, Meal Mill And Farm Cottages				59°14′11″N 2°39′26″W	Category B	5907	Upload Photo
Sanday, Quivals Farmhouse, (Former School), Including Boundary Wall And Ancillary Buildings				59°15′49″N 2°34′48″W	Category B	5910	Upload Photo
North Ronaldsay, Peckhole Mill				59°21′41″N 2°25′08″W	Category B	46398	Upload Photo
North Ronaldsay, Sheep Dyke And Associated Punds				59°22′19″N 2°24′55″W	Category A	46400	Upload Photo
Sanday, Westove, Scar Former Windmill				59°17′23″N 2°34′28″W	Category B	6189	Upload Photo
North Ronaldsay, Nether Linnay				59°22′59″N 2°25′34″W	Category B	46395	Upload Photo
North Ronaldsay, Linklet House, Including Outbuilding, Boundary Walls And Gatepiers				59°22′12″N 2°25′41″W	Category C(S)	46396	Upload Photo
Sanday, Westove, Scar Former Water Mill				59°17′34″N 2°35′04″W	Category B	46403	Upload Photo
North Ronaldsay, Rue, Including Outbuildings And Boundary Walls				59°23′11″N 2°22′55″W	Category B	6688	Upload Photo
North Ronaldsay, Hooking Watermill				59°21′58″N 2°24′45″W	Category C(S)	6192	Upload Photo
North Ronaldsay, Barren Ha				59°22′05″N 2°25′05″W	Category C(S)	46391	Upload Photo
North Ronaldsay, Sandback				59°22′59″N 2°23′49″W	Category C(S)	46399	Upload Photo
North Ronaldsay, War Memorial				59°22′09″N 2°25′39″W	Category C(S)	49985	Upload Photo

== Key ==
The scheme for classifying buildings in Scotland is:

- Category A: "buildings of national or international importance, either architectural or historic; or fine, little-altered examples of some particular period, style or building type."
- Category B: "buildings of regional or more than local importance; or major examples of some particular period, style or building type, which may have been altered."
- Category C: "buildings of local importance; lesser examples of any period, style, or building type, as originally constructed or moderately altered; and simple traditional buildings which group well with other listed buildings."

In March 2016 there were 47,288 listed buildings in Scotland. Of these, 8% were Category A, and 50% were Category B, with the remaining 42% being Category C.

== See also ==
- List of listed buildings in Orkney
