= Cunningsburgh =

Coordinates: 60.054°N 1.226°W

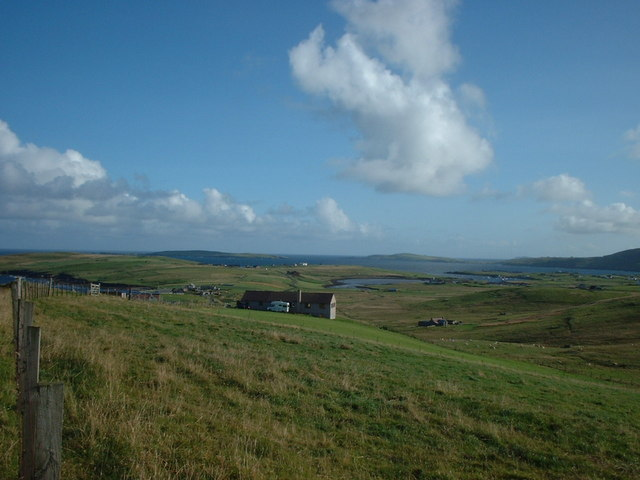
- Aithsetter, with Mousa in the distance

- Location within Shetland
- OS grid reference: HU430301
- Civil parish: Dunrossness
- Council area: Shetland
- Lieutenancy area: Shetland
- Country: Scotland
- Sovereign state: United Kingdom
- Post town: SHETLAND
- Postcode district: ZE2
- Dialling code: 01950
- Police: Scotland
- Fire: Scottish
- Ambulance: Scottish
- UK Parliament: Orkney and Shetland
- Scottish Parliament: Shetland

Cunningsburgh, formerly also known as Coningsburgh (Old Norse: Konungsborgr meaning "King's castle"), is a new hamlet and ancient parish in the south of Mainland, Shetland, Scotland. The hamlet is on the coast, nine miles (14 kilometres) south-southwest of Lerwick, about halfway between there and Sumburgh Head. The parish was merged with Dunrossness and Sandwick in 1891. It is on the A970 road. There is a primary school, a marina, a community shop, a public hall, a history centre, a touring park, and a United Free Church of Scotland kirk.

Amongst the settlements in the parish are Aithsetter, Ocraquoy, and Gord.

Cunningsburgh is included in the South Mainland Up Helly Aa fire festival (SMUHA). SMUHA was the first Up Helly Aa event to have elected a female Guizer Jarl, Lesley Simpson, in 2015.

== History ==
There is a prehistoric steatite quarry site in Catpund, Cunningsburgh.

A large sandstone block dated between the 10th and 11th centuries CE was found in a burial ground in Cunningsburgh. Old Norse runic inscriptions on the stone suggest it was erected as a memorial. The runestone is now on display at the National Museum of Scotland, Edinburgh.

Outsider artist, poet and musician Adam Christie was born in Aith, Cunningsburgh in 1869 and became known for his stone sculptures of human heads. At the age of 32 Christie was committed to Sunnyside Psychiatric Hospital, Montrose, and never returned to Shetland. His work has been posthumously exhibited in Montrose and Glasgow. There is a memorial to Christie outside the Cunningsburgh History Group's headquarters. The Cunningsburgh memorial was funded by History Scotland and made by one of Christie's living descendants.

On 22 November 1944 a de Havilland Mosquito DZ642 crashed in Royl Field. The Cunningsburgh History Group dedicated a memorial plaque to the crew, which was erected in 2018.

== Cunningsburgh Show ==
The Cunningsburgh Show is an annual agricultural show, held on the second Wednesday of August. First held in 1944 as a livestock show, it is now the largest event of its kind in Shetland, attracting around 4,000 people. Livestock exhibited include cattle, sheep, and poultry, and there are other competitions including baking, jam making, and equestrian events. The 2014 show included over 2,800 individual entries across all categories.

Due to the COVID-19 pandemic the 2020 show was a virtual-only event.
