= Scar boat burial =

Viking boat burial site in Orkney

Coordinates: 59.2978°N 2.5679°W

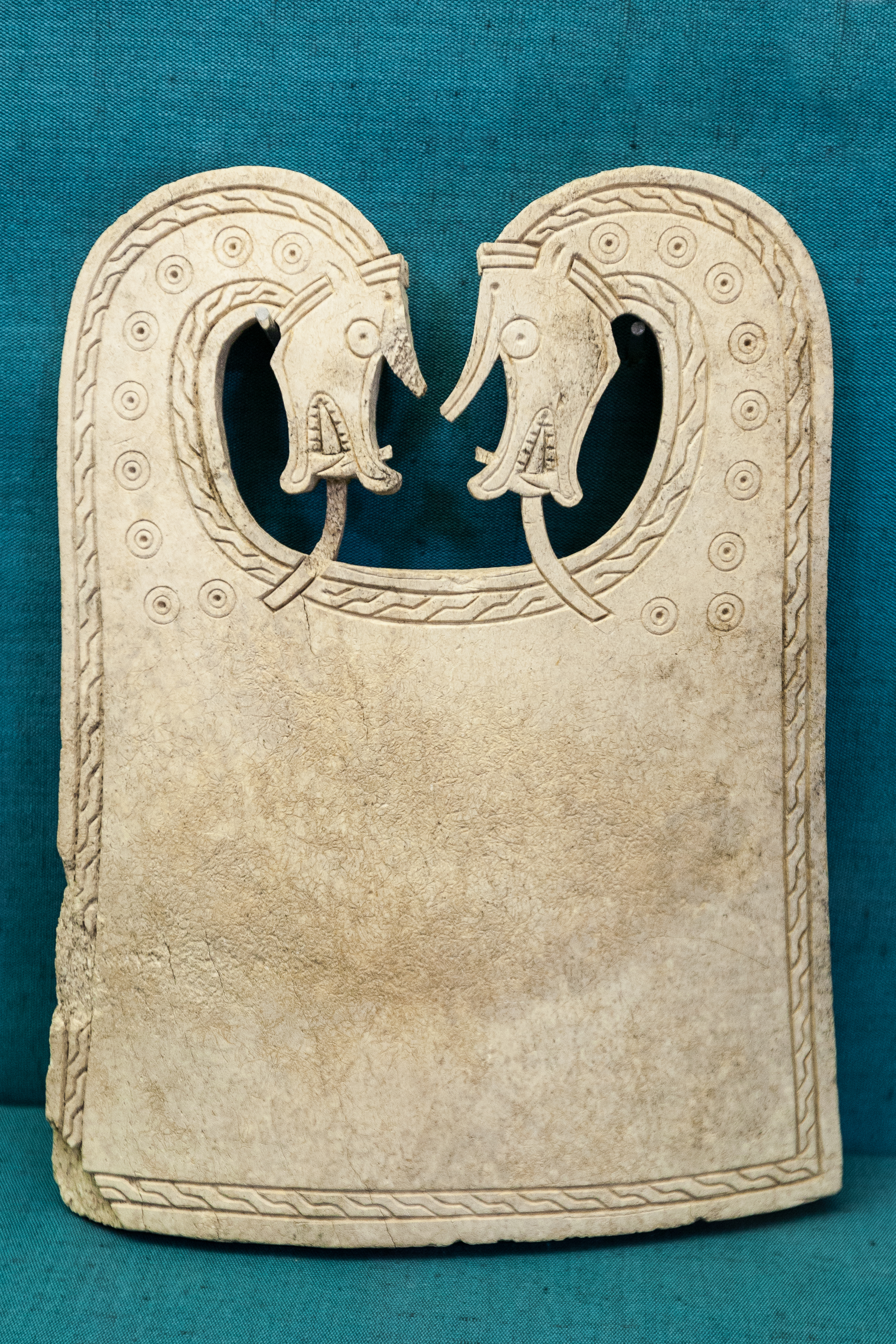
The whalebone plaque found at the site in 1991

The Scar boat burial is a Viking boat burial near the village of Scar, on Sanday, in Orkney, Scotland. The burial, which dates to between 875 and 950 AD, contained the remains of a man, an elderly woman, and a child, along with numerous grave goods. Although the site had to be excavated quickly because of the threat of coastal erosion owing to bad weather conditions, it yielded many important finds.

== Discovery and excavation ==
The site at The Crook Beach, 1 km northeast of Scar, was found in 1985 by John Dearness, a farmer on Sanday. He found bones sticking out of the ground and a small lead object, and thought that he might have discovered the resting place of a dead sailor. Dearness died before the significance of the site was realized.

In 1991, Orkney County archaeologist Julie Gibson visited the island, having heard of the discovery of the bones six years earlier. She was shown the small lead object, and took it to Kirkwall for identification. As it turned out to be a lead weight for measuring bullion, Gibson and Dr Raymond Lamb investigated the site further.

Appreciating the significance of the site, the archaeologists realised they had to act swiftly, as it was exposed and rapidly eroding. Historic Scotland put together a team led by Norwegian expert Magnar Dalland to excavate the site, which took place over November and December 1991.

== Description of the site ==
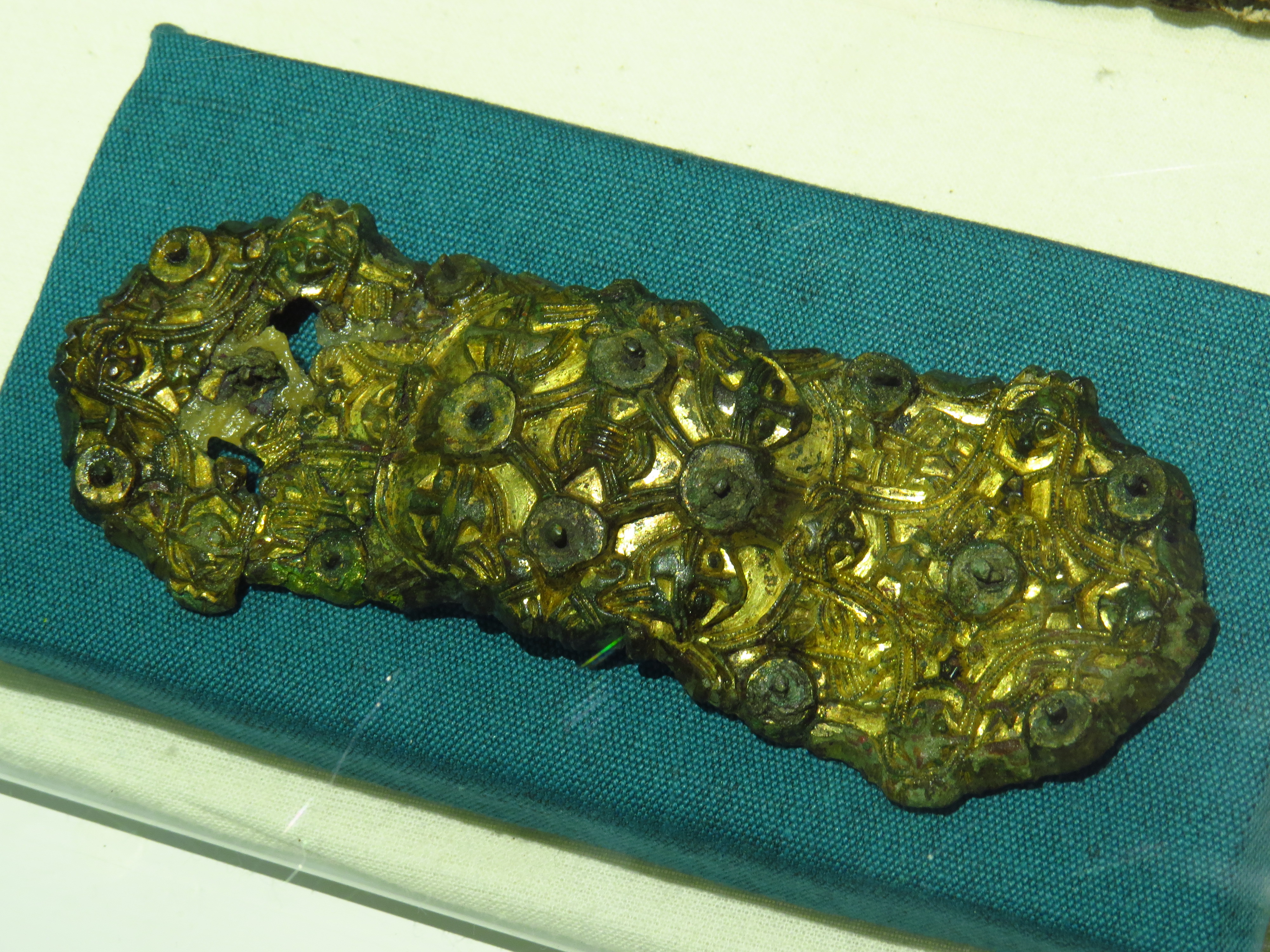
A gilded brooch found at the burial

The wood of the 6.5-metre (21 ft) long and 1.5-metre (4.9 ft) wide boat had rotted away, leaving more than 300 iron rivets. It was placed in a boat-shaped stone-lined enclosure which was packed with further stones. There were also stones forming a walled enclosure inside the boat itself, within which were found the remains of three bodies. Sand within the boat lining was found not to match sand from Orkney, Shetland, nor the Scottish mainland, indicating that the boat was not made in Scotland, and that both it and its occupants may have come from Norway or elsewhere.

The walled enclosure contained the remains of a man, a woman, and a child, along with numerous grave goods. The man was aged about 30 when he died, the woman about 70, and the child—of unknown sex—about 10 or 11. There is evidence that the man had rowed a boat when he was younger, and that the woman had habitually sat cross-legged, and had possibly spun flax.

Grave goods found next to the man include a sword, a quiver with arrows, a bone comb, and gaming pieces. Found next to the woman was a whalebone plaque (pictured) that has become known as the Scar Dragon Plaque, and a gilded brooch. Goods found next to the woman included a comb, shears, a sickle, and two spindle whorls. No evidence was found of how any of the three occupants died.

In 2010 the Scar Dragon Plaque was briefly loaned to the Jorvik Viking Centre in York.

== See also ==
- Norse funeral
- Norse–Gaels
- Norse Scotland
- Port an Eilean Mhòir ship burial
- Lilleberge Viking Burial
- Uí Ímair
