= Scar, Orkney =

Coordinates: 59.292°N 2.580°W

Scar
- Village
- Location within Orkney
- Council area: Orkney
- Lieutenancy area: Orkney
- Country: Scotland
- Sovereign state: United Kingdom
- Police: Scotland
- Fire: Scottish
- Ambulance: Scottish

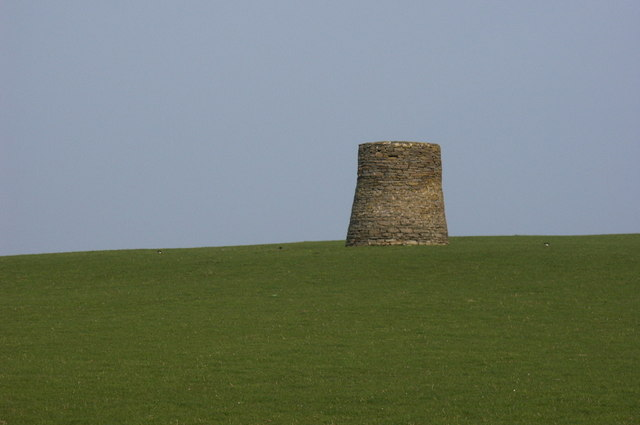
Former windmill near Scar.

Scar is a village and farm complex on the island of Sanday in Orkney, Scotland. The B9068 road runs from Scar to Kettletoft. The Scar boat burial was found at the Crook Beach in 1985 and discovered in September 1991. Scar House (late 18th to early 19th century), former windmill (later 18th century) and former water mill (18th to 19th century) are B listed buildings.

== See also ==
- Scar boat burial
