= Aithsetter =

Coordinates: 60.057°N 1.208°W

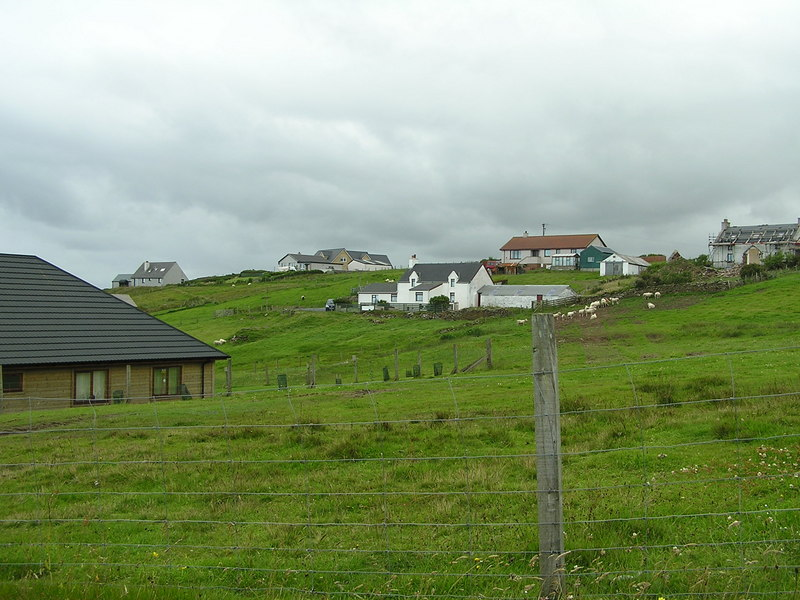
- Aithsetter, Cunningsburgh

- Location within Shetland
- OS grid reference: HU440304
- Civil parish: Dunrossness
- Council area: Shetland
- Lieutenancy area: Shetland
- Country: Scotland
- Sovereign state: United Kingdom
- Post town: SHETLAND
- Postcode district: ZE2
- Dialling code: 01950
- Police: Scotland
- Fire: Scottish
- Ambulance: Scottish
- UK Parliament: Orkney and Shetland
- Scottish Parliament: Shetland

Aithsetter (Old Norse: Eiðseti, meaning "the farm at the isthmus") is a village on the island of Mainland, in Shetland, Scotland. Aithsetter is in the parish of Dunrossness, towards the north end of the district of Cunningsburgh and formerly of that ancient parish. It is nearly 10 miles from Lerwick.
