= Kimbland distillery =

Scottish distillery on Sanday, Orkney

Region: Island
- Location: Sanday, Orkney
- Coordinates: 59.2831°N 2.4617°W
- Owner: Kimbland Distillery Ltd
- Founded: 2020; 6 years ago
- Founder: Sebastian Hadfield-Hyde
- Status: Mothballed
- Water source: Borehole
- Mothballed: 2023
- Website: https://kimblanddistillery.com/

Kimbland distillery is a Scotch whisky and gin micro-distillery located on the Orkney island of Sanday. The distillery began production in 2020. It claimed to be the most northerly Scotch whisky distillery in the world until the Lerwick Distillery was established in Shetland in 2022.

== History ==
Kimbland distillery was established by Sanday resident Sebastian Hadfield-Hyde. It was incorporated as a company in August 2017, distilling its first products in 2020, and reportedly began maturing its first Scotch whisky in 2023. The distillery uses an Orcadian barley known as bere, which has been grown in the Orkney Islands since the Neolithic period. Kimbland distillery has also claimed to be the world's first carbon negative distillery.

In 2023, the Deerness distillery in Deerness, Mainland announced that it would become the first new Scotch whisky distillery in Orkney since Scapa distillery opened in 1885, however this claim was challenged by Hadfield-Hyde, as Kimbland distillery had reportedly been maturing their first batch of Scotch whisky months earlier than Deerness distillery.

== Food Standards warning ==
In December 2025, an urgent warning was issued by Food Standards Scotland (F.S.S.), advising consumers not to purchase or consume any product from the Kimbland distillery, inclusive of the new make spirit, the gin or any liquid from any cask or barrel. It was reported that the distillery had failed to adhere to any of the safety regulations issued by the agency, and had failed to provide evidence that its products met the required safety standards. Kimbland distillery had reportedly not been distilling any product for '18 months' at the time of the December 2025 announcement.
