= Sanday Light Railway =

Former railway line in Scotland

Coordinates: 59.21957°N 2.69367°W

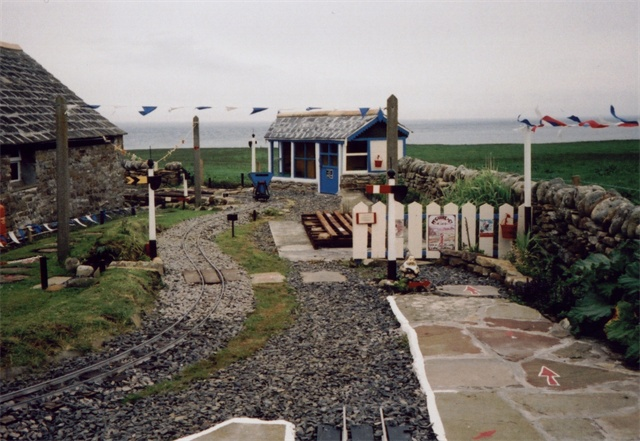
- Sanday Light Railway in June 2002

Service
- Type: Passenger railway

History
- Opened: 1999
- Closed: 2006

Technical
- Line length: 1 mi (1.6 km)
- Track gauge: 7 1/4 in (184 mm)

The Sanday Light Railway was a privately owned ridable miniature railway situated in Braeswick, on the island of Sanday, Orkney, Scotland.

The railway was of 7 1/4 in (184 mm) gauge. The first rails were laid down in 1999, and the line closed at the end of 2006. It was the most northerly passenger carrying railway in the British Isles, and although it was primarily the owner's hobby it did achieve the status of a tourist attraction and local curiosity.

The railway sometimes ran one of its two steam locomotives, a 2-4-2 and a 2-4-0, but more often one of three petrol locomotives. The railway also owned a number of items of rolling stock, including a very rare Cromar White first-class carriage.

Although trains had been operating occasionally in some form beforehand, the railway was officially opened to the public in August 2006 by Sir Peter Maxwell Davies just a few months before its closure, which was variously attributed to the owner being unable to keep his promise to hold Sir Peter's civil partnership ceremony there or unreasonable demands placed upon the railway's operators by local council officials.

In 2008, the owner was taking legal action against a number of organisations over perceived discrimination and misconduct by those organisations in relation to the railway, its associated tea-rooms and the abortive civil partnership ceremony.
