= William Sichel =

British long-distance runner (born 1953)

William Morley Sichel (born 1 October 1953 in Welford, Northamptonshire) is a British long-distance runner.

== Biography ==
He is a science graduate of the University of London in 1976. He is now an International ultra distance runner and has the distinction of having won his debut races at 100 km, 24 hours, 3 Days, Six Days, 7 Days and 8 Days. He was world number one for the Six Day event in 2006 and has represented Great Britain eleven times since 1996. He is a former British 100 km champion, world 100 km champion for his age group, and world record holder for treadmill endurance. Sichel moved to the Orkney island of Sanday in 1982.

He won the Monaco Six Day race in 2006 and 2007, and also in 2006 came 7th in the 135 mile (216 km) Badwater Ultramarathon in Death Valley, California in a record time for a British runner, becoming the first Scot to complete the event . In 2007 he became the Scottish 48-hour record holder, and achieved the best British performance since 1998 in the Spartathlon in Greece.

In 2008 Sichel set an All-Time Scottish 6 Day track record of 857.070 km/532.56 miles when winning the Hamm 6 Day race in Germany.

In the Athens 1000 Mile World Cup race held in March 2010 Sichel was runner-up in an age-group world record of 13 days 20 hours, 8 minutes and 1 second. Average of over 72 miles (2.8 marathons) a day. Sichel became the oldest British person ever to have completed a 1000 miles in under 16 days. He also set intermediate age-group world records at 6 Days and 1000 km. The last time a British male runner completed a 1000-mile race, in under 16 days) was in 1991.

In May 2011 Sichel set an overall 6 Day Great Britain road record of 834.190 km/518.34 miles when winning the International 6 Day road race in Balatonfured.

In the Monaco “No Finish Line” 8 Day race in 2011 (which had over 6,000 participants) Sichel won the event outright, set a new course record and became the first person to cover more than 1000 km during this event.

In 2014 Sichel competed in the World's Longest Certified Footrace - the Self Transcendence 3100 Mile race in New York. He finished in 50 days, 15 hours, 6 minutes and 4 seconds becoming the first person from Britain to complete the event inside the 52-day time limit] and also the first person aged over 60 to finish the race since it started in 1997. He accomplished these achievements despite having previously had cancer.

Sichel was a founding director of the Sanday Development Trust 2004–2011, and was nominated for Orkney's Citizen of the Year award in 2006 and 2007.

Sichel was suddenly bereaved in July 2017 when his wife of 35 years, Elizabeth, died from lung cancer.

In April 2019 Sichel became the first person to run the North Coast 500 mile tourist route around the Highlands of Scotland. He completed the route in 8 days 19 hours 7 minutes and 7 seconds.

In November 2019 Sichel moved to the Orkney capital, Kirkwall.

In January 2020 Sichel decided to leave ultramarathons behind and return to standard marathon running- 26.2 miles/42.2 km.

Sichel underwent prostate surgery (TURP) in February 2021 and hip surgery (THR) in Kaunas, Lithuania in May 2023.

At the Frankfurt Marathon on Sunday October 27th Sichel won his M70 age-group in a time of 3:32:57. An age-group personal best.
