= William Towrie Cutt =

William Towrie Cutt (26 January 1898 – 1981) was a Scottish writer, mainly of books for young readers.

Cutt was born in Sanday, Orkney, the ninth child of John Cutt and Betsy Muir. He emigrated to Canada in 1926. He graduated from the University of Alberta with BEd and MA degrees. He worked as a teacher between 1928 and 1963. He was married to Margaret Cutt (née Davis). His ashes were buried in Sanday.

== Selected works ==
On the Trail of Long Tom (1970) – set in Canada
Seven for the Sea (1972) – set in Sanday
Message from Arkmae (1972) – set in Sanday
Carry my Bones Northwest – set in Canada and Orkney (1973)
Faraway World (1977) – an autobiography about his boyhood in Sanday
