= Matthew Armour =

Scottish minister (1820–1903)

Rev. Matthew Armour (12 April 1820 – 23 March 1903) was a radical Free Church of Scotland minister on the island of Sanday, Orkney, remembered for supporting the island's crofters.
