= Knowes of Trotty =

Bronze Age burial mounds in Orkney, Scotland

Coordinates: 59.04016°N 3.14924°W

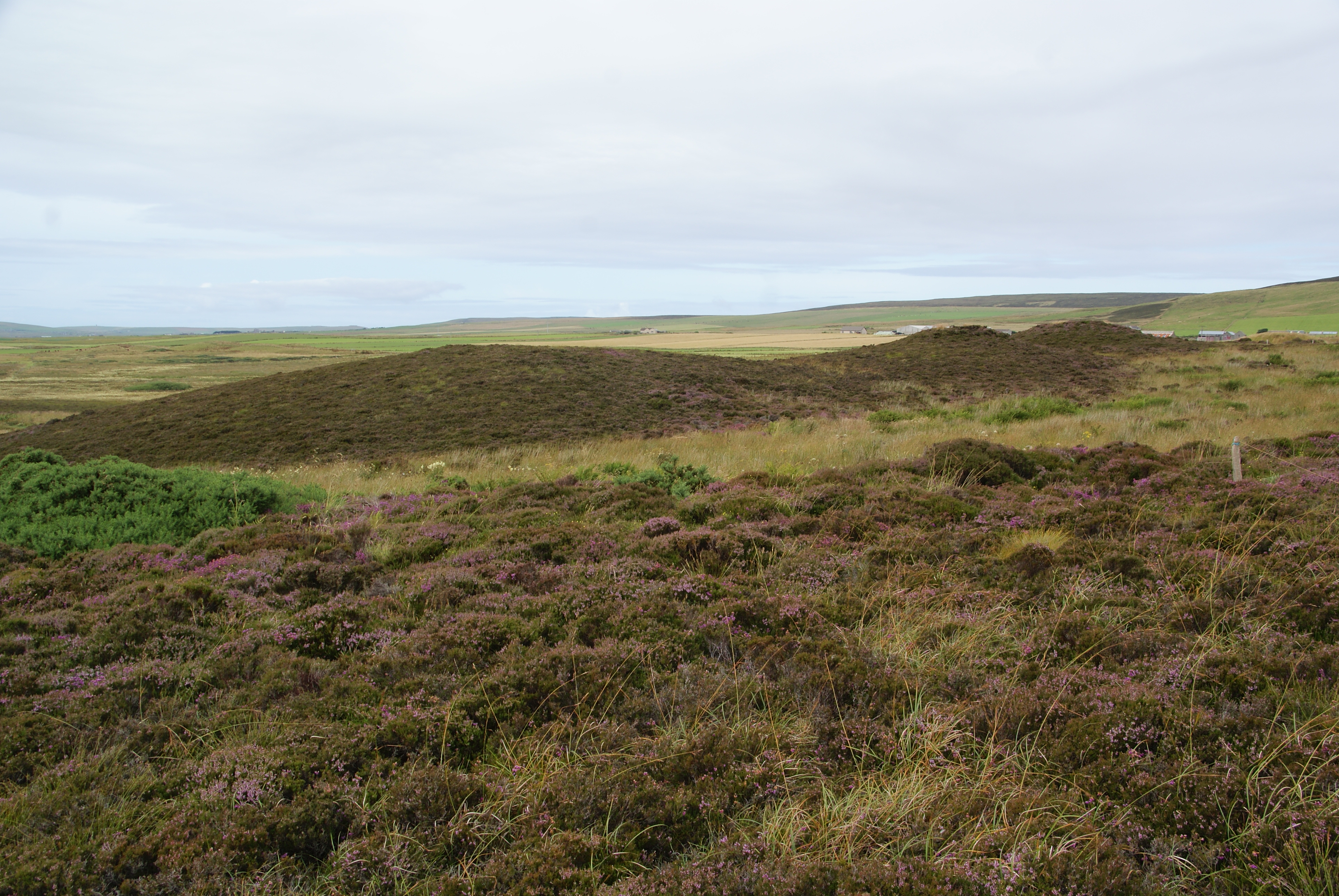
Knowes of Trotty burial mounds

The Knowes of Trotty is a Bronze Age cemetery located in Mainland, Orkney in Scotland. The ancient site consists of a group of twelve surviving burial mounds (or barrows), dating to 2030–1770 BC. Along with cremated human remains, four gold discs and a number of amber beads and pendants were discovered in the largest mound in 1858. Knowes of Trotty is one of the earliest group of burial mounds in Orkney and one of the largest Bronze Age cemeteries in the United Kingdom.

== Description ==
=== The site ===
The Knowes of Trotty Bronze Age burial site is located east of the Loch of Harray, in Mainland, Orkney. Twelve burial mounds are situated at the bottom of the western slopes of the Ward of Redland. The mounds are laid out in two rows, and range in diameter from 9 to 18 m (30 to 59 ft), and in height from 0.6 to 3 m (2.0 to 9.8 ft) in height. The largest mound, is at the north end of the group and is 18 m (59 ft) in diameter, 3 m (9.8 ft) in height, and sits on an elevated platform. The barrows were originally surrounded by a stone cairn which was then covered in earth.

Knowes of Trotty is one of the earliest group of burial mounds in Orkney and is considered to be one of the largest of the Bronze Age cemeteries between Orkney and southern England. Due to passage of time and soil erosion, the mounds are visible today only as slight bumps in a large field. There is evidence that the other burial mounds have been explored previously, but no other human remains or burial artefacts have been recorded. In the Bronze Age, the barrows would have much higher and viewed easily from far away.

=== Burial contents ===
The largest mound, when excavated in 1858, was found to contain a stone burial cist flanked by tall standing stones. The cist contained cremated human bones, four gold discs, and amber beads and pendants. The discs were made from paper-thin gold foil and were decorated with concentric circles of zig-zags and lines. The amber pieces consisted of two round beads, two hooked-shaped pendants and seventeen broken amber plates. The rectangular plates were pierced with holes and were originally included in a spacer-plate necklace.

== History ==
=== Discovery ===
Nicol Flett, a farmer from Huntiscarth, in the Harray parish in Orkney, was the first known person to open any of the burial mounds, digging into the largest Knowes of Trotty mound in 1858. (Note: The National Museums Scotland recognizes Nicol Flett as the first person to excavate the mounds. Several published sources recognize George Petrie as the first person to excavate the Knowles of Trotty site.) He discovered a stone cist in the center of the mound, bordered on two sides by two upright stones. The cist contained cremated human bones at the center of the mound. Four gold discs, and 27 amber pieces were also found. Flett reported his discovery to the local antiquarian, and Orkney Sheriff Clerk, George Petrie who excavated the site further. Flett left the human remains in the burial mound. The gold and amber artefacts were later sold to the National Museum of Antiquities of Scotland in 1859.

The mound was excavated again between 2002 and 2005 by archaeologists Nick Card and Jane Downes. They recovered the human remains and uncovered additional fragments of gold as well as amber pieces. The cremated remains were radiocarbon-dated to 2030-1770 BC. A geophysical and topographical survey of the site conducted in 2005–2006 by archaeologists from the University of the Highlands and Islands determined that the Bronze Age site may have originally held 20 barrows, along with funeral pyres, pits and enclosures. The survey also uncovered early Neolithic structures, including a house and a pottery kiln.

=== Review of finds ===
The source of the amber is thought to be from eastern Sweden and southern Finland, and the gold used to make the discs was from Scotland. The decoration style of the gold discs is similar to similar items manufactured in Wessex, in the south of England during the same time period. It has been suggested that the gold discs were conical button covers. The amber plates that were probably part of a necklace are believed to have been later divided into individual beads. These burial artefacts are considered to be the richest grave goods found in Orkney.

== See also ==
- Prehistoric Scotland
- Prehistoric Orkney
- Liddle Burnt Mound
