= John D. Mackay =

Scottish schoolteacher

John D. Mackay (born 1909, in Maeback, Papa Westray – December 1970) was an Orcadian schoolteacher. He taught on Stronsay and North Ronaldsay before working as headmaster of Sanday School between 1946 and 1970.

He is remembered locally for writing to The Times in 1967 suggesting that Orkney and Shetland be returned to Norway after five centuries as part of Scotland. His letter brought publicity to Orkney and boosted some residents' morale, at a time when absorption into the administrative structure of the Scottish Highlands seemed destined to cause a reduction in the powers of the local authorities. A stream of local publicity efforts followed.
