= Braeswick =

Coordinates: 59.218°N 2.685°W

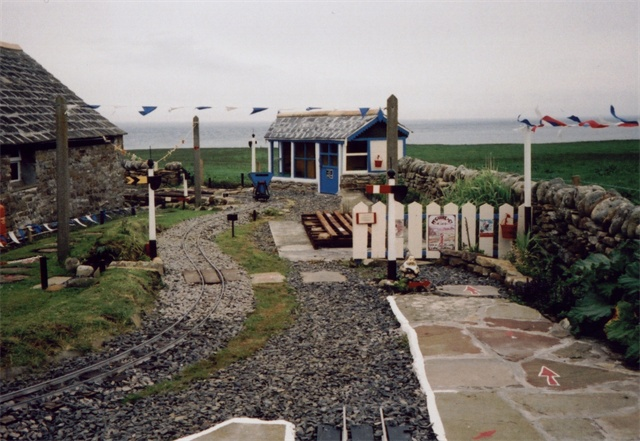
- Sanday Light Railway, formerly Britain's most northerly passenger carrying railway, in Braeswick

- Location within Orkney
- OS grid reference: HY608369
- Civil parish: Cross and Burness
- Council area: Orkney
- Lieutenancy area: Orkney
- Country: Scotland
- Sovereign state: United Kingdom
- Post town: ORKNEY
- Postcode district: KW17
- Dialling code: 01856
- Police: Scotland
- Fire: Scottish
- Ambulance: Scottish
- UK Parliament: Orkney and Shetland
- Scottish Parliament: Orkney

Braeswick is a settlement on the island of Sanday, in Orkney, Scotland. The settlement is within the parish of Cross and Burness, and is situated on the B9070.

== See also ==
- Sanday Light Railway
