= Kettletoft =

Coordinates: 59°14′N 2°36′W

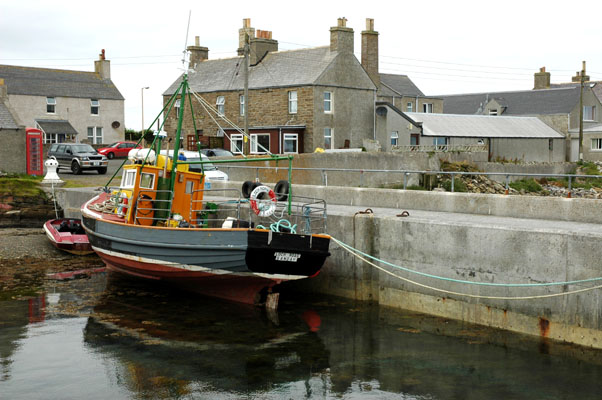
Fishing boat at Kettletoft Pier

Kettletoft is a settlement on the island of Sanday in Orkney, Scotland. The B9068 road runs from Kettletoft to Scar and the B9069 from Kettletoft to Northwall. Kettletoft pier, including the slipway, is a B listed building and was inscribed on 16 September 1999.
