= Harray =

Parish on Mainland, Orkney, Scotland

Coordinates: 59°2′48″N 3°11′0″W

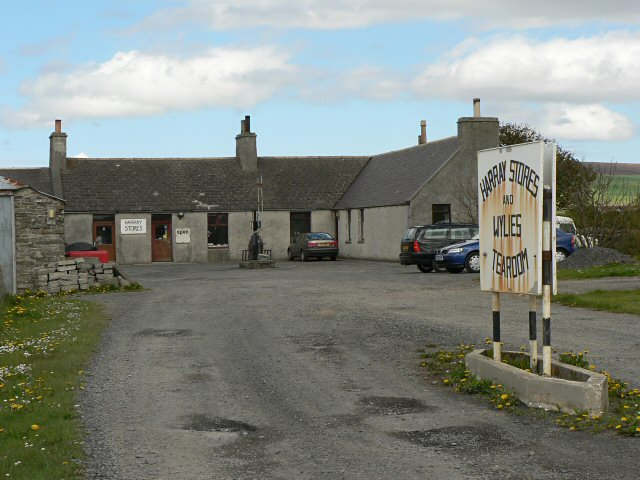
Harray Stores

Harray (pronounced /ˈhæri/) (Old Norse: Herað; Norn: Herrað) is an Orcadian parish and village on Mainland, Orkney, Scotland, United Kingdom. The village is near the Loch of Harray and was used by the Vikings for waterway transportation and Old Norse was spoken in the area up until the 1700s. The flat and swampy area is near multiple Neolithic sites and a burial mound, Knowes of Trotty, is in the area.

== Geography ==
Harray is mostly flat and swampy, and has many mounds or 'howes' (from the Old Norse word Haugr meaning mound or hill). Harray is located three miles to the north of the village of Finstown and is to the east of the Loch of Harray.

== History ==
Knowes of Trotty, a burial mound from the Bronze Age, was discovered in the area in 1858. The Neolithic sites of the Ring of Brodgar and Standing Stones of Stenness are located nearby.

Harray was used by the Vikings for waterway transportation. Old Norse was reportedly still being spoken in Harray by the early 1700s.

== Economy ==
The Hudson's Bay Company (HBC) was a significant employer in Harray and the rest of the Orkney Islands in the 18th and 19th centuries. 16 people worked for the HBC in 1788, 34 in 1800, 35 in 1812, and 25 in 1818. As a result of their employment with the HBC, some men from Harray married and had children with women from the First Nations in Canada. John Spence returned to Harray with his three mixed-race children in the mid-19th century after being widowed.

== Works cited ==
=== Books ===
- Davis, Vin; Edmonds, Mark, eds. (2011). Stone Axe Studies III. Oxbow Books. ISBN 9781842175965.
- Judd, Carol; Ray, Arthur, eds. (1980). Old Trails and New Directions: Papers of the Third North American Fur Trade Conference. University of Toronto Press. ISBN 9781487589059.
- Langley, Chris; McMillan, Catherine; Newton, Russell, eds. (2021). The Clergy in Early Modern Scotland. Boydell & Brewer. ISBN 9781800102293.
- Richards, Colin; Jones, Richard, eds. (2016). The Development of Neolithic House Societies in Orkney: Investigations in the Bay of Firth, Mainland, Orkney (1994–2014). Boydell & Brewer. ISBN 9781909686892.

=== News ===
- Campsie, Alison (4 August 2020). "Lost Viking waterway found in Orkney". The Scotsman. Archived from the original on 10 July 2025.
- Waiser, Bill (24 February 2020). "Northern Scottish isles workers played important role in Hudson's Bay Company expansion in Sask". Canadian Broadcasting Corporation. Archived from the original on 10 July 2025.

=== Web ===
- "Harray Vistior Guide". VisitScotland. Archived from the original on 10 July 2025.
