= Catpund =

Quarry in Shetland, Scotland

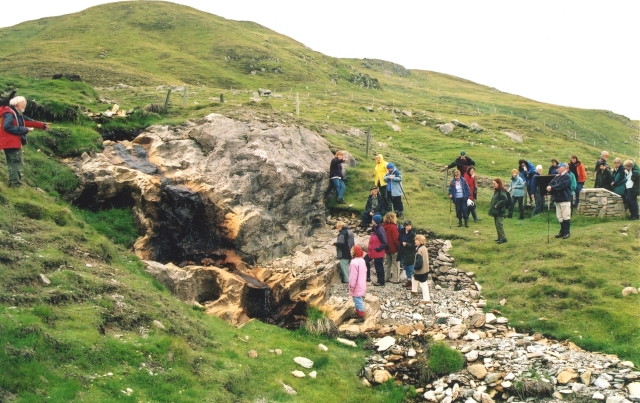
- Catpund

- Location in Shetland Islands, Scotland
- 60°01′35″N 1°14′18″W
- Type: Quarry
- Periods: Norse
- Location: Shetland

Catpund is a quarry site in Shetland, Scotland, where steatite vessels were cut from the rock from prehistory onwards. The quarrying marks are still visible today.

== Location ==
The Catpund quarry is located beside a burn in Dunrossness, Mainland.

== History ==
Steatite is also known as soapstone, or, in the Shetland dialect, "diales", "kleber", "klever", or "clammel". These terms have their origin in Old Norse. It has a number of properties that made it an attractive material to past peoples. The high talc content means that it is soft, so easily carved, it hardens on exposure to air or heat and it can be heated and cooled without shattering. Evidence of quarrying from Catpund has been recognised from the 1940s at the latest. An excavation in 1988 revealed part of the quarry floor including the hollows remaining from over one hundred soapstone vessels. Similar vessels were discovered in the later Norse levels at Jarlshof dating to the 12th and 13th centuries AD.

== Description ==
Quarrying scars can be seen along the bank of the burn of Catpund where vessels were chiseled from the rock. Similarities with vessels from Jarlshof indicate that the quarried vessels were likely of Norse date.

== Archaeological finds ==
There are twenty three recorded sources of steatite on Shetland, but of these only two have been excavated, Catpund and Clibberswick on Unst. Several fragments of steatite vessels have been discovered from Catpund and are currently found in the Shetland Museum and the National Museum of Scotland. A prehistoric house was excavated in 1988 in advance of industrial quarrying. The artefacts found indicated that domestic activities took place there, and that the house was in use some time during the middle to late Bronze Age. Further excavations the 1980s and early 1990s ahead of mineral extraction by the Shetland Talc company shed more light on the quarrying process. Over ten tonnes of material was recorded by the archaeologists and were either blocks, pieces steatite not yet formed into a blank, blanks, pieces with a rough shape to it ready for finishing into a vessel and finished vessels. The majority of the quarrying appears to date to the Viking periods. No tools were found at Catpund but analysis of the tool marks on the steatite pieces suggested they used blunt or pointed chisels.

== Images ==
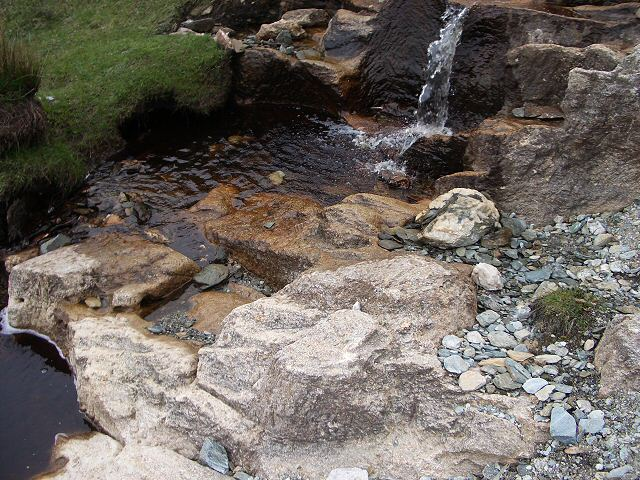
Quarry workings at Catpund quarry

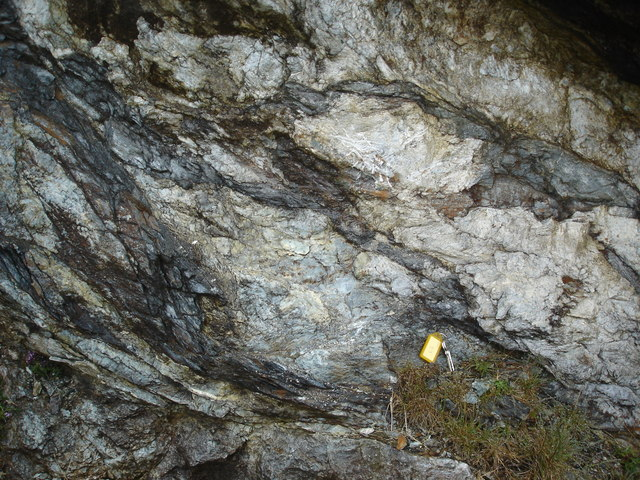
Soft grey soapstone veins
