= Liddle Burnt Mound =

Coordinates: 58°44′45″N 2°55′03″W

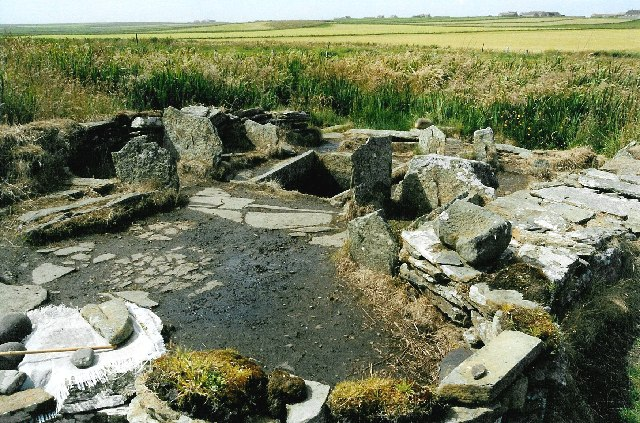
Remains of an ancient building, uncovered beneath the burnt mound.

Liddle Burnt Mound is a Bronze Age site on the island of South Ronaldsay, Orkney. The site consists of the remains of a building and a mound that surrounds it on three sides. The purpose of the site is controversial, but most investigators believe burnt mounds hosted a "domestic function", perhaps related to cooking.

== Description ==
The Liddle Burnt Mound is located on Liddle Farm; the farmer, Ronald Simison, had been using the mound as a quarry for road metal until he came across stone structures in 1972. He alerted Colin Renfrew who was excavating at Quanterness. John Hedges, a member of his team, investigated the site and recognized the remains of a stone building at the centre of the mound. The building is oval with thick external walls. From these, interior walls project into the main room creating compartments, one of which houses a hearth. In the centre of the structure is a large recessed, stone tank, lined with flagstones and rendered waterproof by the surrounding clay. The capacity of the tank is nearly one thousand litres and it was found half filled with stones that were shattered and "fired" by intense heat. Hedges originally thought that the building represented a house, but he was troubled by the distribution of features; for example, there is no obvious place to sleep.

The surrounding mound still rises to a height of 2 metres (6.6 ft) in places, and calculations suggest an original volume of at least 200 cubic metres (7,100 cu ft). It consists primarily of shattered stone, charcoal, and ash. Artifacts recovered from the mound include hammerstones, pot lids and pottery. These items, combined with the tank and hearth found in the building, suggest that the site was used for cooking. Burnt bones of goat and sheep support this interpretation, which was put to the test with an experiment in Orkney where a leg of lamb was cooked in a stone tank heated by a peat fire.

Dating of materials excavated from the mound indicate that the site was in use between 1200 and 500 BC.

== Alternate interpretations ==
There are more than 200 known burnt mounds in Orkney and almost as many known in Shetland. They are also found throughout the British Isles. O'Kelly suggested that burnt mounds represent temporary hunting camps used for cooking joints of meat. However, bone is only occasionally reported from burnt mound sites, as at Liddle, which might seem unusual for a cooking site. This has been explained by the soils being too acidic for the bone to be preserved, but it would seem unlikely that all of the soils relating to burnt mounds were so acidic that no bone survived, particularly as the pH of the soil will vary considerably from site to site. There are examples of burnt mounds on neutral or basic soils, without bone being apparent. It has also been suggested that burnt mounds were saunas or used in salt or leather preparation.

== Isbister Chambered Cairn ==
Liddle Farm is also the site of Isbister Chambered Cairn, popularly known as the Tomb of the Eagles.

== See also ==
- Timeline of prehistoric Scotland
- Prehistoric Orkney
