= B roads in Zone 9 of the Great Britain numbering scheme =

The numbering zones for roads in Great Britain

B roads are numbered routes in Great Britain of lesser importance than A roads. See the article Great Britain road numbering scheme for the rationale behind the numbers allocated.

== Zone 9 (3 digits) ==
Road	From	To	Notes
B900	Leith	Craigleith	
B901	Edinburgh city centre	Trinity, Edinburgh	
B902	A803 at Falkirk	A88 at Falkirk	Previously went from Queensferry to Bo'ness; this is now the A904 and B924.
B903	A803 near Champany	Blackness	
B904 (defunct)	A803 at Polmont	A904	Declassified in the 1970s.
B905	A8004 near Bonnybridge	B902 at Falkirk	
B906	A9 at Falkirk	B902 at Falkirk	
B907	B800 at South Queensferry	B924 at South Queensferry	Formerly part of the B800
B908	A908 at Alloa	A91, at Alva	
B909	A907 near Alloa	A908 at Alloa	
B910	A907 near Clackmannan	A977	
B911 (defunct)	A907 in Dunfermline	A907 in Clackmannan	Route west of Cairneyhill was upgraded to a portion of the A985 (the section north of Kincardine was renumbered to A977 when the Kincardine Bridge opened in 1936) by 1932 and remainder of route upgraded to A994 by 1935. Later on the section through Valleyfield and Torryburn became B9037 when the A985 was rerouted around those villages.
B911 (defunct)	A85 in Dundee	A85 in Dundee	Declassified in the 1970s.
B912	A907 at Dunfermline	B917	
B913	A91 at Dollar	A907 at Gowkhall	
B914	B913, at Saline	M90 J4	
B915	A823	B914	
B916	A921 at Dalgety Bay	A823 at Dunfermline	
B917	B996, near Kelty	B981, near Cowdenbeath	
B918	B996, at Kinross	A91	Is cut in two by the A977
B919	A911, at Wester Balgedie	A91	
B920	B981, at Lochgelly	A911, at Scotlandwell	
B921	A92	B981 at Cardenden	
B922	B921	B981 at Cluny	
B923	A921 at Burntisland	A921 at Kinghorn	
B924	A90	South Queensferry	
B925	A92 near Crossgates	A921 at Kirkcaldy	Split into three parts by the B981 and the A910
B926 (defunct)	A910 at Kirkcaldy, Fife	A921 at Kirkcaldy, Fife	Upgraded to Class I status sometime between 1969 and 1986 as the A988, but was later downgraded back to Class II status as a portion of the B981 due to rerouting of the A92.
B927	A915 at Leven, Fife	A916 at Montrave, Fife	Northern ends directly opposite the West Lodge of the Montrave Estate of the Gilmour Baronets
B928	A955 at Kirkcaldy	A921 at Kirkcaldy	
B929	A955 at Kirkcaldy	A915 near Kirkcaldy	
B930	A955 near Buckhaven	A915	
B931	A955 at Buckhaven	A955 at Leven	Swapped with the A955 in the 1970s.
B932	A955 at Leven	A915 near Methil	
B933	A955 at Leven	A915 at Leven	
B934	A823	A9	
B935	A912 at Bridge of Earn	B934 near Forteviot	
B936	A913 at Den of Lindores, Fife	A92 at Freuchie, Fife	Via Auchtermuchty and Falkland
B937	A913 at Lindores, Fife	A92 near Ladybank, Fife	
B938	A92 near Ladybank	B9129 at Ladybank, Fife	About 1 kilometre (5.0 furlongs)
B939	A916 at Craigrothie, Fife	A915 at St Andrews	
B940	A91 at Cupar	A917 near Crail	Passes "Scotland's Secret Bunker" (now a museum)
B941	B940 at Peat Inn	A917 at Kilconquhar	
B942	A917 at Balchrystie, Fife	A917 near Pittenweem	Via Colinsburgh, Fife
B943	A917 at Pittenweem	Pittenweem harbour	
B944	B931 at Buckhaven	B931 at Buckhaven	
B945	A914/A919 at St Michaels, Fife	B946 at Tayport	
B946	A92	B945 at Tayport	Via Wormit and Newport-on-Tay
B947	A984	A93 at Blairgowrie and Rattray	
B948	A923 at Coupar Angus	A94 at Coupar Angus	
B949	A93 at Blairgowrie and Rattray	A923 at Blairgowrie and Rattray	
B950	A924 near Kirkmichael	A93	
B951	B955, near Kirriemuir	A93	
B952	A926	B954	
B953	A94 at Balbeggie	A90 at Inchture	
B954	A923 at Birkhill	B951	
B955	A926 at Kirriemuir	Clova	Splits into two parts half way along its route to form a loop serving Glen Clova
B956	A928 at Kirriemuir	B955 at Kirriemuir	
B957	B956, at Kirriemuir	A90 near Finavon	
B958 (defunct)	A90 at Dundee	A90 near Glencarse	Declassified in 1994 when the A90 was extended north.
B959	A929	A92, Dundee	
B960	A929	A90 at Dundee	
B961	A92 at Dundee	A933	
B962	A930 at Monifieth	B961, near Newbigging	
B963 (defunct)	A92 at Muirdrum	A932 near Forfar	Upgraded to a portion of the A958 in 1924, then downgraded to the B9128 in the 1970s.
B964	A92 at Arbroath	A933 at Arbroath	
B965	A933 near Friockheim	A92 near Inverkeilor	
B966	A935 at Brechin	A90	Northern junction with the A90 inaccessible due to the removal of Abbeyton Bridge.
B967	A92 near Inverbervie	A90 near Fordoun	
B968	B976 near Aboyne	A93 at Aboyne	
B969	A92	B921	Through Glenrothes, Fife
B970	A86 Kingussie	A95 east of Grantown-on-Spey	Runs through Feshiebridge, Inverdruie and Nethy Bridge along east side of River Spey
B971	A93 in Ballater	B976 near Ballater	Modern maps show that the route as a spur of the B976 but Aberdeenshire Council acknowledges that the B971 number still exists.
B972	A93 near Ballater	A93 near Ballater	
B973	A96 near Blackburn	A96 near Blackburn	
B974	A937 at Marykirk	A93 at Banchory	
B975	A941 Dufftown	B9014 Dufftown	
B976	B974 at Strachan	A939	
B977	A980 north of Banchory	A90 at Balmedie	Tortuous route by way of Landerberry, Echt, Dunecht, Lyne of Skene, Leylodge, Kintore, Hatton of Fintray, Cothall and Belhelvie
B978	A930 at Broughty Ferry	B9128	
B979	Stonehaven	B999 near Whitecairns	Tortuous route by way of Netherley, Maryculter, Peterculter, Kirkton of Skene, Blackburn, Hatton of Fintray and Newmachar
B980	B981 near North Queensferry	A823 at Rosyth	Cut into two parts by A985
B981	A909 at Cowdenbeath	A910 at A92, Kirkcaldy West Junction	
B982 (defunct)	A92 at Aberdeen	A956 at Aberdeen	Upgraded to the A956 in 1924.
B983	A956 at Aberdeen	A9119 at Aberdeen	Created in 2020 as a result of a massive reclassification due to the opening of the Aberdeen Western Peripheral Route. Follows College Street, Wapping/Guild Street, and Denburn Road. The section from Springbank Terrace to Denburn Road was previously part of the A93, and the section on Denburn Road was previously part of the B986. Previously went on Mid Stocket Road, Mount Street, Rosemount Viaduct, and Union Terrace from the A92 to the A93 (now the B983) until it was declassified and the number was reused on the current route in the 2020 reclassification.
B984	A96 at Craibstone Roundabout, Aberdeen	Dyce Drive	Follows Argyll Road. Created in 2020 as a result of a massive reclassification due to the opening of the Aberdeen Western Peripheral Route. Previously went from the A944 in Mastrick via Springhill Road and Howes Road to the A96 in Bucksburn. The section on Howes Road was declassified when a section of the road was closed to traffic. The remaining section on Springhill Road was declassified by 2013.
B985	B9077 at Aberdeen	Coast Road at Aberdeen	Follows West Tullos Road and Hareness Road. Created in 2020 as a result of a massive reclassification due to the opening of the Aberdeen Western Peripheral Route. Previously went on Watson Street, Esslemont Avenue and Rose Street from the A944 (now unclassified Rosemount Place) to the A9013 (now unclassified Union Street) until it was declassified and the number was reused on the current route in the 2020 reclassification. Originally went from the A944 (now Queen's Road) via Carden Place, Skene Street, Rosemount Viaduct, and Schoolhill from A984 (now Queen Street and Albyn Place) to the A96 (now an obliterated section of St. Nicholas Street); most of this became part of the B9119 (now A9119) when it was extended, and the remainder was declassified.
B986 (defunct)			Ran from the A93 (now B983) Wapping Street via Denburn Road, Gilcomston Steps, Skene Square, Berryden Road, Belmont Road, and Clifton Road to the A92. In 2020, the section on Denburn Road became part of the new A983 while the remainder was declassified as a result of a massive reclassification due to the opening of the Aberdeen Western Peripheral Route. It appears that the Berryden Road corridor will receive an A-road number upon completion of the current dualling project.
B987	B994 near Kintore	A96 at Kintore	
B988	A92 the Parkway, near Bridge of Don	B991 St. Machar Drive (formerly A978) at Aberdeen	Follows Gordon Brae, Gordons Mills Road, and Tillydrone Road. Created in 2020 as a result of a massive reclassification due to the opening of the Aberdeen Western Peripheral Route. Previously went on Justice Street in Aberdeen.
B989 (defunct)	A96 at Aberdeen	A96 at Aberdeen	Became a portion of rerouted A944 in the late 1980s.
B990	A96 at Aberdeen	A956, at Aberdeen	
B991	A956 at Aberdeen	A96 at Aberdeen	Created in 2020 as a result of a massive reclassification due to the opening of the Aberdeen Western Peripheral Route. Follows St. Machar Drive; formerly part of the A978. Previously went on Bedford Road from the A92 to the A978 (now the B991) at Aberdeen until it was declassified and the number was reused on the current route in the 2020 reclassification.
B992	A944 at Whitehouse	A947 near Towie Barclay Castle	By way of Keig, Auchleven, Insch and Auchterless
B993	B976 between Birse and Marywell	A947 at Whiterashes	By way of Potarch, Mid Beltie, Torphins, Tillyfourie, Monymusk, Kemnay, Port Elphinstone and Nether Crimond
B994	Kintore	Kemnay	
B995	A92 near Newport on Tay	B946 at Newport on Tay	
B996	A909 at Kelty	A912	
B997	A956 at Aberdeen	B977	
B998	A9 at Causewayhead	A91	
B999	Blackdog (A90)	B9170 near Tarves	

== Zone 9 (4 digits) ==
Road	From	To	Notes
B9000	Pitmedden	Newburgh	
B9001	Inverurie	A97 near Forgue	
B9002	A96 at Mill of Carden	A941 west of Rhynie	Former A941 and A979, swapped with the A941 in 1935. First used from the A96 in Inverurie to the A92 in Fraserburgh. This was upgraded to the A981 in the early 1930s; the portion south of New Deer is now part of the B9170. A portion along Commercial Road in Old Meldrum was renumbered to the A920, but is now unclassified after the A920 was rerouted. Next used from the A97 in Rhynie to the A941 in Elrick. Swapped with the A941 in 1935.
B9003	A975, near Auchmacoy	Collieston	Originally ran from Old Meldrum to Newburgh. Renumbered as an extension of the B9000 in 1934; the western half is now the A920.
B9004 (defunct)	B9000 at Pitmedden	B9005 at Ellon	Upgraded to Class I status as the A920 in the 1970s.
B9005	A90 south of Ellon	Fyvie	Originally ran from the A92 in Foveran to the A949 near Cruden Bay. Upgraded to the A975 before 1932, although the southern end was rerouted.
B9006	Inverness	Fort George	
B9007	A938 east of Carrbridge	A940 at Logie	
B9008	Tomintoul	A97 at Bridge of Avon	
B9009	Dufftown	B9008 near Glenlivet	
B9010	Elgin	Forres	
B9011	Forres	Findhorn	
B9012	Elgin	B9040 east of Hopeman	
B9013	Burghead	A96 west of Elgin	Originally ran from the A96 in Craigellachie to the A97 south of Rhynie. Renumbered to an extension of the A941 by 1932; the eastern end is now the B9002 after it swapped with the A941.
B9014	Keith	Dufftown	Originally ran from the B9013 (now A941) east of Dufftown to the then-A96 in Huntly. Now part of the A920 after the two routes swapped numbers sometime after 1972.
B9015	Rothes	Kingston	
B9016	A98 junction with A990	A96 north of Keith	
B9017	Newmill	A96 west of Keith	
B9018	Cullen	A95 east of Keith	
B9019 (defunct)	A942 in Ianstown	A98 in Portknockie	Upgraded to an extension of the A942 in the early 1930s; the western part is now the B9021.
B9019 (defunct)	Seafield Street (A98), Portsoy	Shore Street, Portsoy	No longer signed by the early 2000s, but still shown as a B road on OS maps. Officially downgraded to a C road in 2017.
B9020	A942 south of Findochty	A942 west of Findochty	
B9021	A942, Portknockie	Portknockie harbour	
B9022	Portsoy	Huntly	
B9023	Aberchirder	Brodiesord (B9022)	
B9024	Turriff	B9001 south of Forgue	
B9025	Turriff	A98 south east of Portsoy	
B9026	Macduff	A947 south of Macduff	
B9027	Cuminestown	A98 north of New Byth	
B9028	A948, South of New Deer	A981, North of New Deer	New Deer Bypass
B9029	Old Deer (B9030)	A98 near New Deer	
B9030	Auchnagatt (A948)	Old Deer (A950)	
B9031	Fraserburgh (A98)	Macduff (A98)	
B9032	Near Rathen (south of Fraserburgh, A90)	B9031 near Coburty	
B9033	Crimond (A90)	Fraserburgh (A90)	
B9034	A90 in Fraserburgh	A98 in Fraserburgh	
B9035 (defunct)	B924, at Dalmeny	A904, at Queensferry	Part of the route is now the A904 and remainder abandoned.
B9036 (defunct)	B902, in Stenhousemuir	A905	Removed in 1980 due to extension of the M876.
B9037	A985 at Cairneyhill	A907 at Blairhall	
B9038	Inverboyndie	Whitehills	Originally ran from the B997 in Corsehill to the A92 (now A90) at Balmedie. Renumbered as an extension of the B977 in 1935.
B9039	Ardersier	A96 east of Balloch	
B9040	Lossiemouth	Burghead	Originally ran from the Water Sound Ferry to Burwick. Now part of the A961.
B9041	A961 near Burwick	Cleat	
B9042	A961 south of St Margaret's Hope	Herston	
B9043	St Margaret's Hope	Hoxa, Orkney	
B9044	A961 north of St Margaret's Hope	South Cara	
B9045	Oil terminal, Flotta	Quoy Ness, Flotta	
B9046	B9045, Flotta	Kirk Bay, Flotta	
B9047	South Walls	North of Linksness, Hoy	
B9048	B9047 west of Lyness, Hoy	Lyness, Hoy	
B9049	B9047 west of Linksness, Hoy	B9047 south of Linksness, Hoy	Originally ran from the B9047 near Quoyness to the shoreline at Burra Sound; this route was just east of the current B9049. Declassified by 1932.
B9050	Eastern end of A960	Sandside Bay, Orkney	
B9051	Eastern end of A960	Deer Sound, Orkney	
B9052	A961, east of St Mary's	A960, near Foubister	
B9053	A964, south of Kirkwall	Scapa Bay	
B9054	Shore Street, Kirkwall	A960, Kirkwall	Originally ran from Finstown to Twatt. Upgraded to Class I status as the A986, likely in 1933.
B9055	A965, Stenness, Orkney	B9056, Aith, Orkney	
B9056	A967, Voy	A967, Bursay	
B9057	A966, Evie	B9056, Aith	
B9058	B9059 east of Balfour, Shapinsay	Ness of Ork, Shapinsay	
B9059	Balfour, Shapinsay	Haco's Ness, Shapinsay	
B9060	Whitehall Village, Stronsay	B9062	
B9061	B9062 at Aith, Stronsay	Rothiesholm, Stronsay	
B9062	North end of Stronsay	South end of Stronsay	
B9063	Veness, Eday	Calf Sound, Eday	
B9064	Westness, Rousay	Wasbister, Rousay	
B9065	Rousay ferry terminal	B9064	
B9066	Rapness, Westray	Pierowall, Westray	
B9067	Pierowall, Westray	Midbea, Westray	Single-track road
B9068	Kettletoft, Sanday	Scar, Sanday	
B9069	B9068 north of Kettletoft, Sanday	Scuthvie Bay, Sanday	
B9070	B9068 at Broughtown, Sanday	Sanday ferry terminal	
B9071	Vidlin	West of Skeld	Originally ran from Channerwick to Sumburgh. Became a portion of an extended A968 in the 1920s, and is now part of the A970.
B9072	Esplanade, Lerwick	King Harald Street, Lerwick	
B9073	A970 at Gulberwick	A970 east of Scalloway	
B9074	A970 at Veensgarth	Hamnavoe	
B9075	Weisdale	B9071 at Laxo	
B9076	Brae	A968 south of Toft	Originally ran from Bridge of Walls to Sandness. Renumbered as a spur of the A971 in the mid 1920s.
B9077	Holburn Street, Aberdeen	A957 south of Crathes	Originally ran from Hillside to Mossbank. Became a portion of the A968 around 1949; the section through Mossbank is now unclassified after the ferry departure point was moved to Toft before 1961.
B9078	A970 north of Hillswick	Esha Ness	Originally ran from Brae to Hillswick. Became a portion of an extended A970 by 1932.
B9079	A970 by Eela Water	Ollaberry	Originally ran from Orbister to Burravoe. Became a portion of an extended A970 by 1932.
B9080	Kirkliston	Linlithgow	Originally ran from Bay of Ulsta to Curravoe. Upgraded after World War II to the A968, between 1946 and 1951. The northern section was swapped with the B9082 by 1955. The A968 swapped with the B9081 in 1971; Ulsta to Mid Yell is now the B9081 and Mid Yell to Dalsetter now the A968. The remaining route to Curravoe has been abandoned altogether since 1972.
B9081	Ulsta	A968 near Mid Yell	Formerly the A968 (and B9080 before that).
B9082	Gutcher	Cullivoe, Yell	
B9083	Cullivoe, Yell	Haa of Houlland, Yell	
B9084	A968 north of Uyeasound	Uyeasound	
B9085	Crewe Toll	Davidson's Mains	Originally ran from Uyeasound to Belmont. Became a portion of the A968 after World War II.
B9086	Haroldswick	Burrafirth, Unst	
B9087	Haroldswick	Norwick, Unst	
B9088	Ness of Brough, Fetlar	Funzie, Fetlar	
B9089	Burghead	Kinloss	
B9090	Nairn	B9006 near junction with A96	
B9091	Nairn	Croy	
B9092	A96 west of Nairn	Ardersier	
B9093	New Pitsligo (A950)	A952 near Fetterangus	Originally ran from Potarch to Aboyne. Upgraded to the A973 around 1926, but was downgraded back to Class II status in the early 1970s; the Potarch-Allancreich section becoming the southern, detached end of the B993 and the remainder part of an extended B976.
B9094	Aboyne	Tarland	
B9095	A933, Arbroath	B9114, Arbroath	Originally ran along Cairnie Road in Arborath. Swapped with the A933 in the mid-1980s.
B9096	Alloa	Tullibody	
B9097	A977 at Crook of Devon	B921 near Auchterderran	
B9098 (defunct)	Luncarty	Caputh	Only existed for 2 years from 1932 to 1934, now part of the B8062.
B9098 (defunct)	Station Road in Kinross	High Street in Kinross	Only shown on two maps from 1955; these maps might be wrong and the B9098 was actually the A922, upgraded a few years after creation.
B9099	Luncarty	Caputh	
B9100	Ferry Street, Montrose	Ferry Street, Montrose	
B9101	Auldearn	B9090 south of Nairn	
B9102	Dufftown	Grantown on Spey	
B9103	Lossiemouth	A95 at Mulben	Crosses the River Lossie at Arthur's Bridge
B9104	Fochabers	Spey Bay	
B9105	A98 near New Byth	A947 north of Turriff	
B9106	A948 south of New Deer	A950 north of Maud	
B9107	Inverallochy	B9033	
B9108	A90 near Boddam	Boddam	
B9109	A904 between junctions 2 and three of M9	B903 near Blackness	
B9110 (defunct)	A904, in Bo'ness	A904, in Bo'ness	Became a portion of the A993 by 1971.
B9111	A96 east of Auldearn	A96 west of Auldearn	Originally ran from Kerse Road to Murray Place in the center of Sterling. Now part of a rerouted B8052.
B9112	Perth	B934 near Forteviot	
B9113	Forfar	A933, at junction with A934	
B9114	Burnside Drive, Arbroath	Ladyloan, Arbroath	
B9115	Drummuir	A96 south of Keith	
B9116	Keith	Newmill	
B9117	A97 near Marnoch	A95 at Farmtown	
B9118	Rothiemay	B9022	
B9119	A944 at Westhill	A93 west of Dinnet	Section east of Westhill renumbered as the A9119 in 2020 due to the opening of the Aberdeen Western Peripheral Route.
B9120	Fettercairn	A92 north of St Cyrus	
B9121	Whitehills	B9025	
B9122	A970 at Boddam	A970 north of Levenwick	
B9123	B9031 south of Gardenstown	Gardenstown	
B9124	Bannockburn	Airth	
B9125	B9119 at Garlogie	B977 south of Echt	
B9126	Lyne of Skene	A944 near Kirkton of Skene	
B9127	Arbroath	A94 at Douglastown	
B9128	A90 north of Forfar	A92, at junction with A930	
B9129	A92 at Ladybank	A914 near Kettlebridge	
B9130	Kirkcaldy	Glenrothes	
B9131	A917 south of Saint Andrews	Cellardyke	
B9132	A905, Grangemouth	A904, Grangemouth	
B9133	A92, Montrose	Ferry Street, Montrose	
B9134	Brechin	Forfar	
B9135	A941 south of Lossiemouth	B9040, Lossiemouth	
B9136	B9008 at Glenlivet	A939 north of Tomintoul	
B9137	A95 at Bridge of Avon	Cragganmore	
B9138	A95 at Marypark	B9102	
B9139	Inverboyndie	Portsoy	
B9140	Tullibody	B913 south of Dollar	
B9141	Dunning	A9 north of Aberuthven	
B9142	Bridge Road, Banff	Low Street, Banff	
B9143	A905, Grangemouth	A904, Grangemouth	
B9145 (defunct)	A94 in Forfar	A932 in Forfar	Declassified in the 1980s when the A99 (now A90) bypass was built.
B9145 (defunct)	B9161 in Inverness	A9 (now A862) in Inverness	May have not actually existed due to hard-to-read online map scans
B9146 (defunct)	B865 in Inverness	B9161 in Inverness	Declassified by 1993 due to completion of the A82. The western end of Harbour Road was part of the B9164, but this was a typo.
~~B9147~~	unused		
B9148	A963, south of Kirkwall	B9053	
B9149	A92, south of Lochgelly	B981 east of Lochgelly	
B9150	Newtonmore	A9 south of Newtonmore	
B9151 (defunct)	A90, in Dundee	A923, in Dundee	Former B958; now unclassified.
B9151 (defunct)			Possible number for the A9 south of Aviemore; may have been briefly used, but is now part of the B9152 as signage at the B9152/A9 junction has "B9151" patched over as B9152.
B9152	A95 north of Aviemore	A9 east of Kingussie	
B9153	Carrbridge	A95 west of Boat of Garten	
B9154	A9, Daviot	A9 north of Tomatin	
B9155	A823, Dunfermline	A907, Dunfermline	
B9156	Dunfermline	A9 near Limekilns	
B9157	Kirkcaldy	A921 west of Aberdour	
B9158	Dinnet	B976 south of Dinnet	
B9159	A882, in Wick	Wick	
B9160	A832 north of Rosemarkie	B9163 west of Cromarty	
B9161	Munlochy	A9 west of North Kessock	
B9162	A862, Conon Bridge	B9163, Conon Bridge	
B9163	Conon Bridge	Cromarty	
B9164	A862 south of Muir of Ord	A862 north of Culbokie	Former B8008; number is out of zone due to rerouting of the A9. Also used in Inverness, connecting the Longman Industrial Estate to the B9161. The number only appeared on a 1986 OS map as well as on a sign. The number on the sign was a typo, and it should have read B9146.
B9165	A9 south of Tain (NH797787)	Portmahomack (NH915847)	
B9166	B9165 at Hill of Fearn (NH840773)	Balintore (NH864757)	
B9167 (defunct)	A9	Dornoch	Former B867; classified as the A949 between 1959 and 1962.
B9168	Dornoch (NH792898)	A9 north of Dornoch (NH781927)	
B9169	A862, Inchmore	A862 south of Beauly	
B9170	Inverurie	Turriff	Formerly A981 to New Deer, A948 New Deer to Turriff
B9171	A917 north of Crail	B942	
B9174	A9 south of Tain	A9 north of Tain	
B9175	A9 south of Tain	Nigg Ferry	
B9176	A9 between Evanton and Alness	A836 south of Ardgay	
B9177	B9006, Inverness	A9 south of Inverness	
B9178	A938, at Dulnain Bridge	A95, near Dulnain Bridge	Former routing of A95 through Dulnain Bridge. Number also in use for the access road to industrial areas in South Bay.
~~B9179~~ - ~~B9199~~	unused		
B9993	A9, near Perth	Bertha Park Highschool	Highest numbered road in the UK since 2018

== See also ==
- A roads in Zone 9 of the Great Britain numbering scheme
- List of motorways in the United Kingdom
- Transport in Aberdeen § Roads
- Transport in Edinburgh § Road network
- Transport in Scotland § Road network
