= A roads in Zone 9 of the Great Britain numbering scheme =

The numbering zones for A-roads in Great Britain

List of A roads in zone 9 in Great Britain starting north of the A8, east of the A9 (roads beginning with 9).

== Single- and double-digit roads ==
Road	From	To	Notes
A9	Falkirk	Scrabster	Formerly continued to John o' Groats; this became part of the A99 in 1997.
A90	Edinburgh	Fraserburgh	Via Perth and Aberdeen Western Peripheral Route. Originally had its north end in Dundee, but was extended north in the 1990s.
A91	St Andrews	Stirling	
A92	Dunfermline	Blackdog interchange	Via Tay Road Bridge, Dundee, Arbroath, Stonehaven and Aberdeen. Swapped with the A914 in the 1990s. Formerly continued north to Fraserburgh; this became the A90 and A952 in the 1990s. There is a dispute about the designation for the Cowdenbeath Spur leading from the M90 (J2A) onto the A92.
A93	Perth	Aberdeen	Via Braemar. Section east of Holburn Street declassified in 2020 due to the opening of the Aberdeen Western Peripheral Route; this section is now Willowbank Road, Springbank Terrace, College Street, and Guild Street.
A94	Perth	Forfar	Via Coupar Angus. Formerly continued north to Stonehaven; this became part of the A90 in the 1990s.
A95	Aviemore	Banff	
A96	Aberdeen	Inverness	Originally ran along Gallowgate on the east end. This was declassified by the 1980s, and the A96 was rerouted over a portion of the A946.
A97	Banff	Dinnet	
A98	Fraserburgh	Fochabers	
A99	Latheron	John o' Groats	Formerly a portion of the A9 (and the A88, A882 and B875 before that) until 1997. An older routing went from the A80 in Pirnhall to the A9 in Bannockburn. Renumbered to a portion of the A91 in the late 1980s.

== Triple-digit roads ==
Road	From	To	Notes
A900	Edinburgh	Leith	Leith Street / Leith Walk / Constitution Street
A901	Leith	Granton	Great Junction Street / North Junction Street / Lindsay Road / Pier Place / Starbank Road / Lower Granton Road
A902	Leith	Maybury	Ferry Road / Telford Road / [joins A90 Queensferry Road] / Maybury Road
A903	Granton	Trinity	Granton Road
A904	South Queensferry	Falkirk	
A905	Grangemouth	Stirling	
A906			Ran from the A823 in Dunfermline to the A90 in Inverkeithing. The southern section was renumbered as an eastern extension of the A985 between 1948 and 1951 (based on maps) and the northern half was downgraded to the B9156 in the mid 1980s. Following construction of the M90, the A90 was downgraded and the eastern end of the ex-A906 is now part of the A921 (the A985 was cut back to the M90).
A907	Stirling	Crossgates	
A908	Alloa	Tillicoultry	
A909	Burntisland	Kelty	
A910	Kirkcaldy	Kirkcaldy	
A911	Windygates	Milnathort	
A912	Perth	Muirhead	
A913	Cupar	Aberargie	
A914	Muirhead	Newport-on-Tay	Swapped with the A92 in the 1990s.
A915	Kirkcaldy	St Andrews	
A916	Windygates	Cupar	
A917	Largo	St Andrews	Coast road via Crail
A918	St Andrews	St Andrews	
A919	St Michaels	Guardbridge	
A920	Ellon	Dufftown	Originally allocated to a road from A90 (now A912) in Perth east and north via Marshall Place and Tay Street to A85 (now A989) & A921 (now South Street). Renumbered to a portion of the A94 in 1936 and is now part of the A989. Later allocated to a road from Dufftown to Keith; this became the B9014 when the current A920 replaced the old B9014 from Dufftown to Huntly and other roads.
A921	Kirkcaldy	M90	Originally allocated to a road from A9 (now Caledonian Road) in Perth via York Place, County Place, and South Street to A85 & A920. Became a spur of the A85 in 1936 and is now unclassified. Later allocated between 1947 and 1955 (based on maps) to a road from Upper Largo to north of Crail as a replacement of the A917 and B942. The A917 and B942 got their sections back while the remainder was downgraded to the B9171.
A922	Kinross	Kinross	Previously allocated to a road from South Street (then A85) in Perth north to West Bridge Street (then A94). Renumbered to a portion of the A94 in 1936, and shown as a spur of the A85 by the mid 1960s, but is now part of the A85 mainline due to creation of the A989.
A923	Dundee	Dunkeld	
A924	Pitlochry	Bridge of Cally	
A925	A923 in Blairgowrie	A93 in Blairgowrie	
A926	Forfar	Blairgowrie	
A927			Ran from A923 northwest of Dundee to downtown Alyth. The section north of the A926 became the B952 and the southern section became the B954.
A928	Kirriemuir	Todhills, A90	
A929	Dundee	Dundee	Dual labelling of King Street (after North Marketgait) / Princes Street and Victoria Road (from Ladywell Roundabout) / Arthurstone Terrace, combining as Albert Street / Forfar Road to meet the A972. Formerly continued north to Forfar; this section became part of the A90 in the 1990s.
A930	Dundee	Carnoustie	
A931			Ran from A92 via Dock Street to A92 (now A991) in Dundee; this became part of a rerouted A92, while the old route of the A92 is now the B959, A929, and A991.
A932	Forfar	Friockheim	The A932 joins the A90 in the west via a flat crossing. It was previously possible to join the A90 in both directions, now it is only possible to continue south.
A933	Brechin	Arbroath	Formerly continued north via what is now the A935 and B966 to Clerk Street (then part of the A94); this section was eliminated when the A94 bypass (now A90 bypass) was built.
A934	Montrose	Glasterlaw	
A935	Brechin	Montrose	
A936			Ran from Southesk Street (then part of the A933) in Brechin via Panmure Street to Clerk Street (then part of the A94). Became part of the A935 when the A94 (now A90) bypass was built.
A937	Laurencekirk	Montrose	
A938	Carrbridge	Dulnain Bridge	
A939	Nairn	Ballater	
A940	Forres	Dava	
A941	Lossiemouth	Rhynie	
A942	Buckie	Cullen	
A943			Ran from Banchory to Bridge of Dee. Downgraded to the B9077 and B974, probably due to rerouting of the A957 across Durris Bridge.
A944	Aberdeen	Corgarff	
A945			Ran from the A9013 in Bridge of Dee (now unclassified Holburn Street) via Riverside Drive to the A956 in Aberdeen. Declassified in 2020 due to the opening of the Aberdeen Western Peripheral Route.
A946			Ran from A96 (now George Street) in Aberdeen to Aberdeen Docks. Became a portion of a rerouted A96 in 1982 after two shopping malls were built over its southern end; the section up to King Street is still part of the A96, the section from King Street to Hanover Street is now the A956 and the remainder unclassified.
A947	Bucksburn	Banff	
A948	Ellon	New Deer	Formerly continued to Turriff via what is now the B9170.
A949	Dornoch	Bonar Bridge	Previously allocated to a road from Peterhead to Toll of Birness. Became a portion of an extended A952 in 1935 and is now part of the A90 and A982.
A950	Peterhead	A98 at New Pitsligo	
A951			First used from the A950 via King Street to Queen Street (then the A952) in Peterhead; became a spur of the A952 in 1935 and is now part of the A982. Next used from A9 (now B9152) south of Aviemore to Coylumbridge, formerly a spur of the B970. Returned to the B970 around 1980 after the A9 Aviemore bypass opened.
A952	Toll of Birness	Cortes	Originally went through Peterhead instead of Mintlaw; this became part of an extended A90 in the 1990s, and the number was reused on the section of the A92 that did not become part of the A90.
A953	A97, Castle Street, Banff	Harbour Place, Banff	Quayside. 300yds long.
A954			Ran as a loop off the A914 (now B946) via High Road in Newport-on-Tay; this became part of the B946 when the Tay road bridge was built, causing the A92 to be extended and the A914 (which later was swapped with the A92) to be rerouted to bypass Newport-on-Tay. A 1966 map lists the route as part of the A914 (a typo).
A955	Kirkcaldy	Leven	
A956	Bridge of Don, Aberdeen	A90 at Cleanhill (near Maryculter)	Includes King Street, Market Street and Wellington Road in Aberdeen; extended from Charlestown to Cleanhill in 2018 as part of AWPR
A957	Stonehaven	Crathes	Known as the Slug Road; formerly the B978 before it was upgraded.
A958			Ran from Muirdrum to Forfar; formerly the B963. Downgraded to the B9128 in the 1970s; the northernmost section is now part of the A932 Forfar relief road.
A959			Ran from Anstruther to Brownhills; formerly the B944. Downgraded to the B9131 in the 1970s.
A960	Kirkwall	Deerness	
A961	Kirkwall	Burwick	
A962	Broad Street, Kirkwall	Junction Road, Kirkwall	Great Britain's shortest "A road".
A963	Kirkwall	Junction with A961	
A964	Kirkwall	Junction with A965	
A965	Kirkwall	Stromness	
A966	Finstown	Birsay	
A967	Stromness	Birsay	
A968	Voe	Haroldswick	Includes two ferry crossings. Previously allocated to a road from Lerwick to Sumburgh; this became part of the A970 when the current route was created.
A969	Lerwick	Lerwick	Formerly continued west to Scalloway via what is now a spur of the A970.
A970	Sumburgh	North Roe	Spurs to Scalloway and Hillswick
A971	Tingwall	Sandness	Spur to Walls
A972	Dundee	Dundee	Formerly continued west to the A90 (now A85); this section became part of the A90 in the 1990s, while the old route of the A90 in Dundee became an extension of the A85.
A973			Ran from Crathie to Potarch. Due to two Class I routes running parallel (the A973 paralleled the A93), it was downgraded before 1974 with much of the route becoming an extension of the B976 and the remainder a detached section of the B993.
A974			Ran from Ordie to Westhill, formerly the B974. Downgraded to the B9119 in the 1970s; the easternmost section is now part of the A944.
A975	A90 (Rashierieve nr Newburgh)	Longhaven (A90)	Aberdeen–Peterhead coastal route
A976			Ran from A907 to A823 in Dunfermline via Baldridgeburn, Mill Street, and Foundry Street; the Baldridgeburn section was downgraded to the B9155 and the rest declassified after 1973.
A977	Kincardine Bridge	Kinross	
A978			Ran from the A956 in Old Aberdeen via St. Machar Drive, Hilton Street, Westburn Drive, Argyll Place, Westfield Road, Craigie Loanings, Albert Street, Waverley Place, Victoria Street, Alford Place, and Union Street to the A9013 (now Holburn Street) in Holburn Junction. In 2020, the section along St. Machar Drive was redesignated as the B991 and the remainder was declassified due to the opening of the Aberdeen Western Peripheral Route.
A979			Ran from Oyne to Gartly. Downgraded in the 1970s (but before 1974) to the B9002.
A980	Alford, Aberdeenshire	Banchory	
A981	New Deer	Fraserburgh	Formerly continued to Inverurie via what is now the B9170.
A982	Peterhead, South A90 Junction	Peterhead, North Road (A90)	Former alignment of A90. Previously allocated to Telford Road from A90 to Ferry Road (then part of the A902) in Edinburgh; this became part of a rerouted A902, while the old route of A902 became the B9085.
A983			Ran from Falkland to southeast of Newburgh; originally the B936. Downgraded back to the B936 after 1974, possibly due to the opening of the M90.
A984	Coupar Angus	Dunkeld	
A985	Kincardine	Rosyth	Now incorporates the Kincardine Bridge.
A986	Finstown	Twatt	
A987			Ran from Kirkcaldy to west of Aberdour; formerly the B924. Downgraded to the B9157 in the late 1980s due to the opening of the new A92. Previously allocated to another road, probably in Perth, but it is unknown where that road was.
A988			Ran from A910 to A921 north of Kirkcaldy; formerly the B926. Downgraded to the B981 in the late 1980s due to the opening of the new A92. Previously allocated to another road, probably in Perth, but it is unknown where that road was.
A989	Perth	Perth	Perth Inner Ring Road, former sections of the A9, A85, A90, A94 and A920.
A990	Broadley	Buckie	
A991	Dundee	Dundee	Dundee Inner Ring Road
~~A992~~			Unused
A993	Bo'ness	Muirhouses	
A994	Dunfermline	Cairneyhill, at Cairneyhill Roundabout	
~~A995~~ - ~~A996~~			Unused
A997			Ran from A9 to A91 north of Stirling Declassified in the early 1970s, but was upgraded to Class II status as the B998.
~~A998~~ - ~~A999~~			Unused

== Four-digit roads ==
Road	From	To	Notes
A9000	South Queensferry	North Queensferry	New road created on 30 August 2017 as a renumbering of the A90 over the Forth Road Bridge as the Queensferry Crossing opened. A short section of original dual carriageway which carried the A90 from the current M90 southern extension can be seen between the eastern carriageway of the A9000 and the southbound slip onto the M90.
A9011			Ran from A92 via Ashgrove Road West to A978 (now unclassified Westburn Drive) in Stockethill. Declassified in 2020 due to the opening of the Aberdeen Western Peripheral Route.
A9012			Ran from A92 in Ashgrove via Rosehill Drive to A978 (now unclassified Hilton Street and Westburn Drive) in Northfield. Declassified in 2020 due to the opening of the Aberdeen Western Peripheral Route.
A9013			Ran from the A92 in Bridge of Dee via Holburn Street, Union Street, and King Street in Aberdeen to the A956. Declassified in 2020 due to the opening of the Aberdeen Western Peripheral Route.
A9103			Possible typo for the A9013.
A9119	Kingswells	Aberdeen	Renumbering of a portion of the B9119 in 2020 due to the opening of the Aberdeen Western Peripheral Route.
A9294	Luncarty	Scone	Cross Tay Link Road, opened in March 2025.

== See also ==
- B roads in Zone 9 of the Great Britain numbering scheme
- List of motorways in the United Kingdom
- Transport in Aberdeen § Roads
- Transport in Edinburgh § Road network
- Transport in Scotland § Road network
