= Victoria Park, Buckie =

Football stadium in Buckie, Scotland

Coordinates: 57°40′23″N 2°57′58″W

Victoria Park
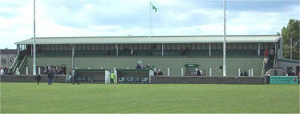
- The main stand at Victoria Park

- Location within Moray
- Location: Midmar Street, Buckie, Moray, Scotland
- Owner: Buckie Thistle F.C.
- Capacity: 3,000 (400 seated)
- Surface: grass
- Record attendance: 8,168 v Falkirk; 1 March 1958
- Field size: 109 x 73 yards

Tenant
- Buckie Thistle F.C. (1919–present)

Victoria Park is a football ground in Buckie in north-east Scotland, which is the home ground of Highland Football League side Buckie Thistle. It is located at the junction of Midmar Street and South Pringle Street, 0.5 miles (0.8 km) from the town centre. The ground has a capacity of 3,000 with 400 seated.

== History ==
Buckie Thistle moved to Victoria Park in 1919 with the first opponents at the ground being Aberdeen.

The record attendance at Victoria Park came in March 1958 when 8,168 spectators watched the club take on Falkirk in the third round of the Scottish Cup. Buckie Thistle narrowly lost 2–1 to the away team.

== Transport ==
The closest railway station to Victoria Park is Keith railway station in the town of Keith, around 13.5 miles (21.7 km) to the south of Buckie. The ground is accessible by road via the A98, which runs to the south of Buckie between Fochabers, at the junction of the A96 in the east, to Fraserburgh in the west. By taking the exit along High Street (A942), Victoria Park is on the left down Midmar Street.
