= Eela Water =

Loch in Shetland, Scotland

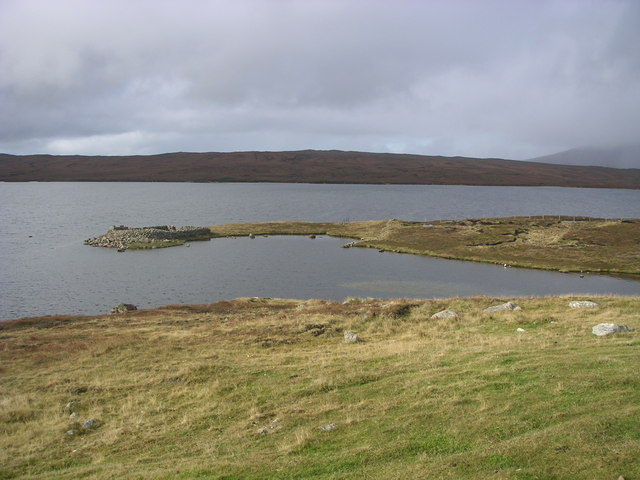
- Eela Water

- Location within Shetland
- Location: Ollaberry, Mainland, Shetland
- Coordinates: 60.490°N 1.398°W
- Type: Lake
- Primary outflows: Burn of Eelawater
- Catchment area: 312 hectares (770 acres)
- Basin countries: Scotland
- Surface area: 64 hectares (160 acres)
- Average depth: 5.1 metres (17 ft)
- Max. depth: 16.8 metres (55 ft)
- Water volume: 3,245,051 cubic metres (114,597,900 cu ft)
- Shore length^{1}: 4 kilometres (2.5 mi)
- Surface elevation: 68 metres (223 ft)
- ^{1} Shore length is not a well-defined measure.

Eela Water (Shaetlan pronunciation: [ˈilə ˌwatər] EE-lə-WAH-tər) is a freshwater loch (lake) in Northmavine, part of the mainland of Shetland in Scotland. Besides being a freshwater fishing location, the site supplies clean water for the mainland of Shetland, and is one of the largest lochs on the mainland. The loch is 3.2 kilometres (2 mi) west of Ollaberry, and only 1.62 miles (2.61 km) to the sea (westwards).

== Description ==
The term Eela is used in Shetland to describe a fishing place, particularly one near to the shore of a body of water. It also used to describe a type of rod fishing, derived from dialectal Norwegian, Ila, which described a type of stone anchor. The Eela rod fishing involved doing so from calm waters, or rowing into the tide and holding the boat steady (usually trying to catch coalfish). However, Tudor states that the name was originally Ola's Water, a personal name.

The bedrock that the loch sits on is mixed, but mostly made up of schists and pink granite, and the surrounding earth made up of peat. The inflows of water have been determined to be of low alkalinity. The granite lies mostly to the east of the loch, which is where the depth dips down sharply to the maximum depth, and the eastern shore is mostly rocky too.

Eela Water is on the north-western arm of the mainland of Shetland (known as Northmavine), some 3.2 kilometres (2 mi) west of the settlement of Ollaberry. The outflow from Eela Water heads west through Little Eela Water and the Burn of Eelawater to head out to sea through Hamar Voe, a distance of only 1.62 kilometres (1.01 mi). The average discharge through Burn of Eelawater at Orbister is 23,950 cubic metres (846,000 cu ft) per day, though not all of the water that is discharged has originated from Eela Water, as other smaller burns run into the Eelawater burn from the surrounding hillsides.

The loch also has a water treatment works (WTW), for supplying freshwater to the mainland of Shetland. These were installed in 2007, replacing some earlier WTWs, at a cost of £1.1 million. The WTW plant is adjacent to the B9079 from Ollaberry, and pumps water to the rest of the mainland in a pipeline through Mavis Grind. The A970 road traverses the east side of the loch connecting Brae and North Roe.

Gammarus lacustris is noted to be present in Eela Water, as are a species of mayfly, known as baetis rhodani. The loch is also noted for its trout fishing. Birds that have been observed at the loch include black-headed gull, common gull, common sandpiper, curlew, eider, golden plover, great skua, greylag goose, lesser black backed gull, oystercatcher, snipe, teal and tufted duck. In 2008, the Scottish Environmental Protection Agency listed Eela Water as having a good ecological status.

Historically the loch featured as one of the boundary markers of the old Northmavine North Parish.

== Loch data ==
The water covers a surface area of 64 hectares (160 acres) (with a maximum length of 1.27 kilometres (0.79 mi)), a mean depth of 5.1 metres (17 ft) and a maximum depth of 16.8 metres (55 ft). Its elevation is 68 metres (223 ft) above Ordnance Datum, and it has a catchment area of 312 hectares (770 acres). In 1910, it was assessed that the loch had a capacity of 2,900,000 cubic metres (103,000,000 ft^{3}), but a 2007 calculation determined it to have 3,245,051 cubic metres (114,597,900 cu ft). It is one of the largest lochs on the mainland of Shetland, the largest being the Loch of Girlsta, which has about three times the amount of water as Eela Water does.
