= A97 =

A97 or A-97 may refer to:

- A97 road (Scotland)
- Dutch Defence, in the Encyclopaedia of Chess Openings
