= List of listed buildings in Rhynie, Aberdeenshire =

This is a list of listed buildings in the parish of Rhynie in Aberdeenshire, Scotland.

== List ==
Name	Location	Date Listed	Grid Ref. (Note: Sometimes known as OSGB36, the grid reference (where provided) is based on the British national grid reference system used by the Ordnance Survey. • "Guide to National Grid". Ordnance Survey. • "Get-a-map". Ordnance Survey.)	Geo-coordinates	Notes	LB Number (Note: Historic Environment Scotland assign a unique alphanumeric identifier to each designated site in Scotland, for listed buildings this always begins with "LB", for example "LB12345".)	Image
18 The Square				57°19′54″N 2°50′01″W	Category C(S)	16037	Upload Photo
19, 20 The Square And 2 Bogie Road				57°19′54″N 2°50′00″W	Category C(S)	16038	Upload Photo
Former Free Church Square				57°19′53″N 2°50′01″W	Category C(S)	16036	Upload Photo
Rhynie Old Kirkyard. Alex Gordon Tomb And Adjoining Coffin				57°19′34″N 2°49′59″W	Category B	16041	Upload Photo
Mill Of Noth				57°20′15″N 2°49′43″W	Category C(S)	16044	Upload Photo
Rhynie Parish Church				57°19′56″N 2°50′08″W	Category C(S)	16034	Upload Photo
Daluaine Walled Garden				57°19′40″N 2°49′59″W	Category B	16045	Upload Photo
23 Main Street				57°19′58″N 2°49′58″W	Category C(S)	16039	Upload Photo
South Manse Square				57°19′53″N 2°50′02″W	Category C(S)	16035	Upload Photo
Rhynie Old Kirkyard				57°19′34″N 2°49′59″W	Category C(S)	16042	Upload Photo
Rhynie And Kearn War Memorial, Enclosure And Square				57°19′55″N 2°50′05″W	Category B	49310	Upload Photo

== Key ==
The scheme for classifying buildings in Scotland is:

- Category A: "buildings of national or international importance, either architectural or historic; or fine, little-altered examples of some particular period, style or building type."
- Category B: "buildings of regional or more than local importance; or major examples of some particular period, style or building type, which may have been altered."
- Category C: "buildings of local importance; lesser examples of any period, style, or building type, as originally constructed or moderately altered; and simple traditional buildings which group well with other listed buildings."

In March 2016 there were 47,288 listed buildings in Scotland. Of these, 8% were Category A, and 50% were Category B, with the remaining 42% being Category C.

== See also ==
- List of listed buildings in Aberdeenshire
