= Abbeyton Bridge =

Former 19th century bridge in Aberdeenshire, Scotland

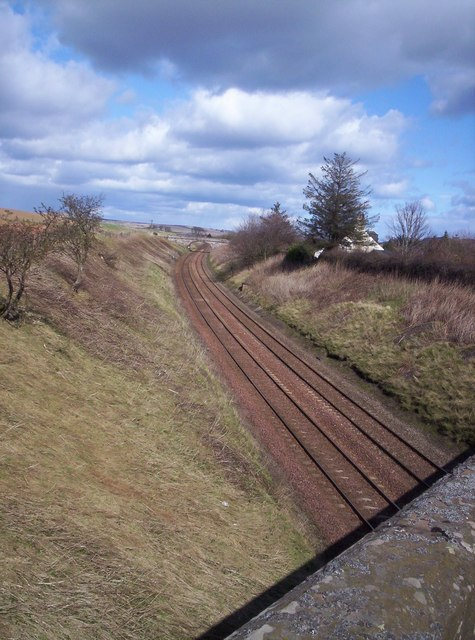
- Photograph taken from the bridge
- Coordinates: 56°53′48.36″N 2°22′57.66″W
- Carries: B966 road
- Crosses: Dundee–Aberdeen line
- Locale: Aberdeenshire

Characteristics
- Design: Arch
- Material: Stone
- No. of spans: 1

History
- Closed: 24 July 2018

Location
- Interactive map of Abbeyton Bridge

Abbeyton Bridge was a road bridge that carried the B966 road over the Dundee–Aberdeen line.

== History ==
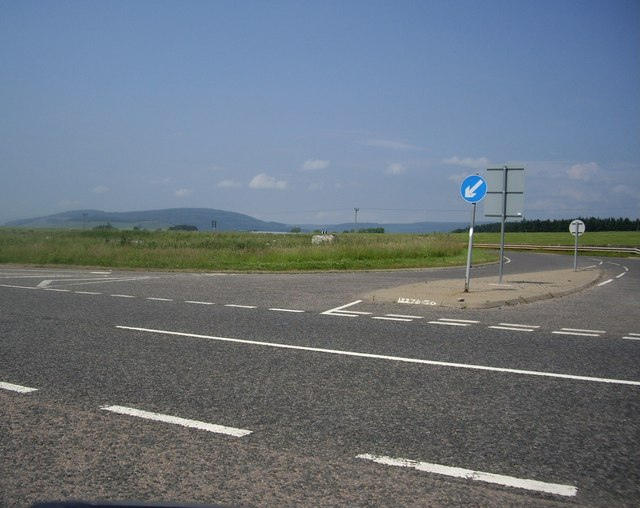
Junction on the A90 leading to the bridge

In June 2018, Aberdeenshire Council introduced a one-way system over the bridge after an inspection found structural defects. The bridge was closed on 24 July 2018 as there was deemed to be a significant risk to the safety of both the railway and road users. The bridge was declared irreparable and the removal process was carried out faster than usual due to the high safety risk. The council stated that the planned removal would cost around £1 million, and that if the railway had to be closed for an emergency removal it would cost the council between £1 million and £3 million.

The bridge was demolished during Christmas and Boxing Day in 2018, when no passenger services operate.

Following the demolition, investigations took place into the possibility of constructing a replacement. On 25 November 2021, councilors approved plans to build a replacement bridge.

== See also ==
- List of bridges in Scotland
