= Broughtown =

Village on Sanday in Orkney, Scotland

Coordinates: 59.255°N 2.598°W

Broughtown: Scots: Brochtoun
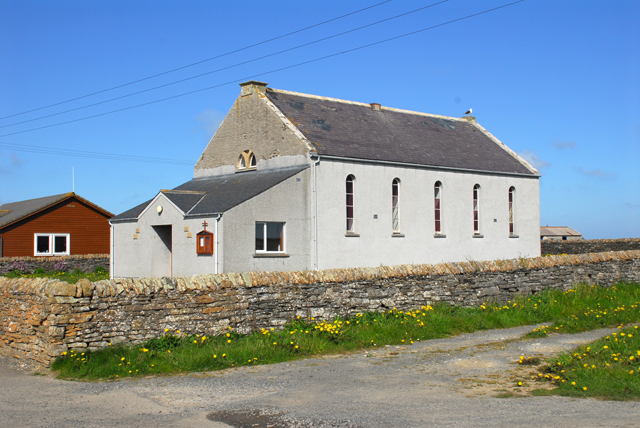
- Sanday Parish Church, Broughtown

- Location within Orkney
- OS grid reference: HY659410
- Civil parish: Cross and Burness
- Council area: Orkney
- Lieutenancy area: Orkney
- Country: Scotland
- Sovereign state: United Kingdom
- Post town: ORKNEY
- Postcode district: KW17
- Dialling code: 01856
- Police: Scotland
- Fire: Scottish
- Ambulance: Scottish
- UK Parliament: Orkney and Shetland
- Scottish Parliament: Orkney

Broughtown is a village on the island of Sanday, in Orkney, Scotland. The settlement is within the parish of Cross and Burness. Sanday Airport is adjacent to the eastern side of the village and Kettletoft is to the south. The B9068 road runs south to north, through Broughtown, connecting Kettletoft with Scar. Meanwhile, the B9070 road runs south-west from Broughtown, and south beyond Braeswick, to the Sanday ferry terminal at Spur Ness.
