= A96 road =

Major road in Scotland

A96

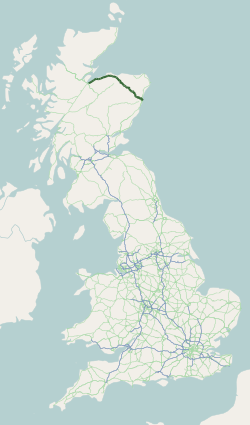

Route information
- Length: 102 mi (164 km)

Major junctions
- South end: Aberdeen; 57.1500°N 2.0939°W
- A944 A978; A90 A947 A920; A97; A95; A98 A941 A940 A939; A9
- Northwest end: Inverness; 57.4820°N 4.1914°W

Location
- Country: United Kingdom
- Primary destinations: Inverness, Elgin, Huntly, Inverurie, Aberdeen

Road network
- Roads in the United Kingdom; Motorways; A and B road zones

The A96 is a major road in the north of Scotland.

It runs generally west/north-west from Aberdeen, bypassing Blackburn, Kintore, Inverurie, Huntly, Fochabers and Forres, and running through Keith, Elgin and Nairn. The road terminates at the A9 outside Inverness.

== Route ==
The road begins at Mounthooly roundabout, just north of Aberdeen city centre. It then exits Aberdeen to the North West, meeting the A92 at the Haudagain Roundabout, a notoriously busy junction. It then passes Bucksburn, and has a junction with Aberdeen Airport. The road is then dual carriageway until Inverurie, where it becomes single carriageway. The route then connects up Huntly, Keith, Fochabers, Elgin, Forres & Nairn before terminating on the A9 at Inverness.

== History ==
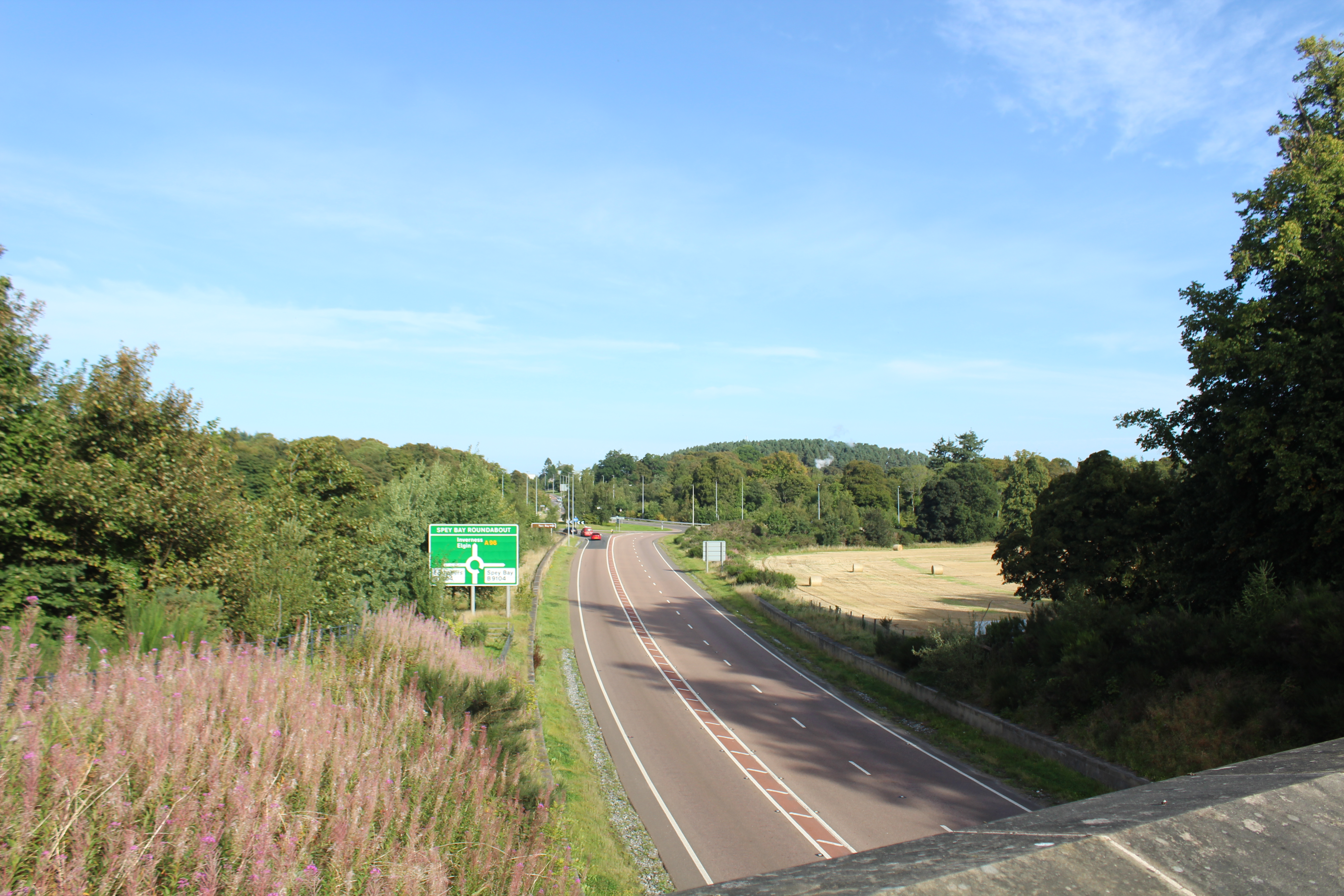
Fochabers bypass leading to Mosstodloch.

The A96 has been improved with the addition of bypasses in the 1980s/1990s for Auldearn, Forres, Lhanbryde, Huntly & Inverurie. The road has been dualled between Inverurie & Aberdeen and several short overtaking lanes exist on the route. There are also short stretches of the route that have been widened and realigned to improve traffic flow and overtaking opportunities.

Debate about a new section of road to bypass Fochabers took place for a number of years. When the new bridge was built over the River Spey (in about 1970), it was built to be in line with a possible northern route. The bypass is to the north of Fochabers and south of Mosstodloch, construction started on 2 February 2010 and was opened in January 2012. The road still passes through many major towns on the route, namely Elgin, Nairn and Keith.

The A96 has a poor safety record in the substantial single carriageway section, and the road has topped polls to find the most unpopular roads in Scotland on more than one occasion.

The A96 was formerly part of the Euroroute system, of route E120 which ran in a circular route between Inverness, Aberdeen, Dundee and Perth.

== Upgrades ==
=== Inveramsay Bridge ===
A new bridge called the Inveramsay Bridge was constructed on the A96 northwest of Inverurie. This bridge goes over the Aberdeen-Inverness railway line instead of under it like the former one. The former bridge was not wide enough for two tall vehicles to fit under it so traffic lights were put in place, but caused serious congestion during peak hours.

=== A96 dualling ===
In 2016, the Scottish Government announced plans to upgrade the A96 road to a dual carriageway by 2030, at a cost of £3 billion. The project would include dualling the 88 miles (142 km) of the A96 that is not dual carriageway between Aberdeen and Inverness.

An 18-mile (29-kilometre) section of the A96 between Inverness and Auldearn that will bypass Nairn will be the first section of the A96 to be dualled.

=== Environmental impact ===
Plans to dual the A9 and A96 have been criticised by Patrick Harvie of the Scottish Greens, who has said the plans are incompatible with the Scottish Government's climate initiatives. Concerns have also been raised over the loss of ancient woodland.

=== Cycle paths ===
A cycle path has been built between Kintore and Port Elphinstone. In October 2021, work began to build a shared cycle and footpath along the road between Lhanbryde and Fochabers.
