= Whiterashes =

Hamlet in Aberdeenshire, Scotland

Coordinates: 57.302°N 2.243°W

Whiterashes: Scots: Fiterashes
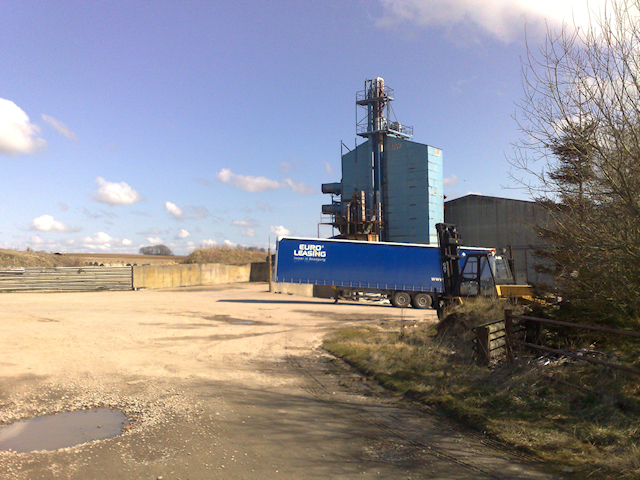
- Grain storage depot west of Whiterashes

- Location within Aberdeenshire
- OS grid reference: NJ854235
- Council area: Aberdeenshire
- Lieutenancy area: Aberdeenshire
- Country: Scotland
- Sovereign state: United Kingdom
- Post town: ABERDEEN
- Postcode district: AB21
- Dialling code: 01651
- Police: Scotland
- Fire: Scottish
- Ambulance: Scottish
- UK Parliament: Gordon and Buchan
- Scottish Parliament: Aberdeenshire East

Whiterashes is a hamlet in the Formartine area of Aberdeenshire, Scotland, lying to the north-west of Newmachar and 3 miles (4.8 km) south-east of Oldmeldrum on the A947 road.

== Affleck ==
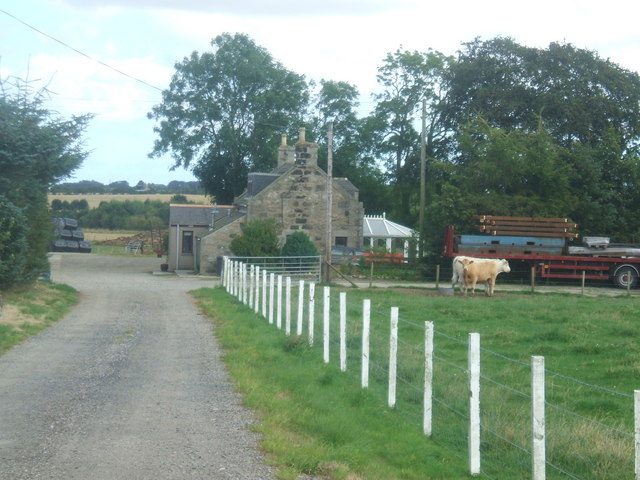
Farm at Lower Affleck

Affleck (Gaelic: Achadh Leac, 'field of the slabs') is a rural area of Whiterashes. The name comes from the same origin as Auchinleck. Other villages or farms in the area are, or have been called, North Affleck, South Affleck, Newton or Nether Affleck, and a small forest or bush called the Woodside of Affleck. The area of land was first noted in 1255, when it was referred to as Achlek in a document regarding land ownership between the Bishop and Church of Aberdeen and Arbroath Abbey, recorded in the Liber S. Thome de Aberbrothoc; Registrorum Abbacie de Aberbrothoc (edited by Cosmo Innes and Patrick Chalmers).
