= A944 road =

Road in Scotland

A944

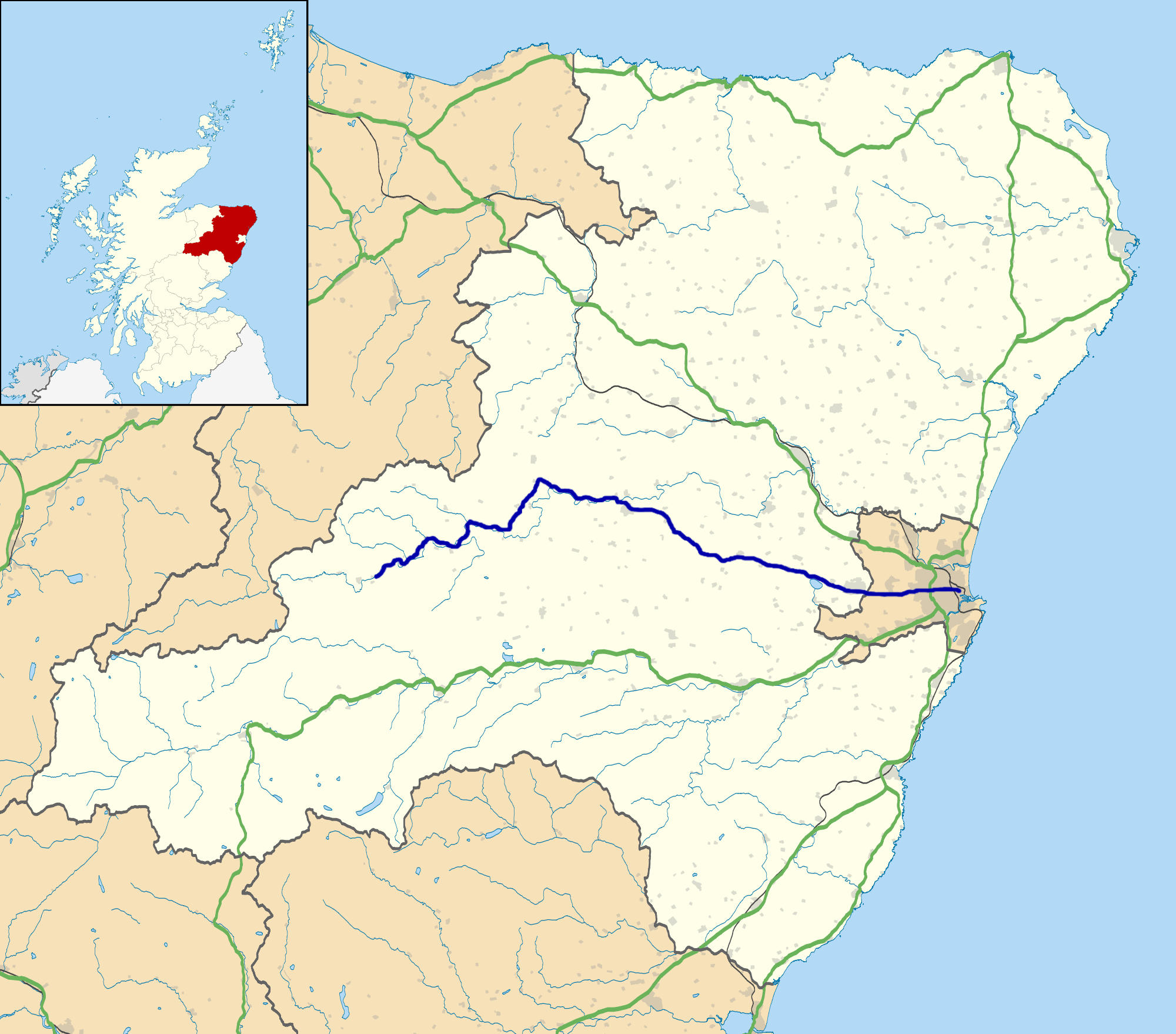

Route information
- Length: 50.5 mi (81.3 km)

Major junctions
- From: Aberdeen
- To: Strathdon

Location
- Country: United Kingdom
- Constituent country: Scotland

Road network
- Roads in the United Kingdom; Motorways; A and B road zones

The A944 road connects Aberdeen with Strathdon in north-east Scotland.

== Route ==
It originates at the Lang Stracht in the city, which is a re-routing as, until 1999, the road left Aberdeen by way of Queens Road in the City Centre. However this route could not cope with the traffic. The road then passes Kingswells where there is a major junction with the A90 (the Aberdeen Western Peripheral Route).

The A944 then passes Westhill by way of Elrick, Dunecht, Sauchen, Millbank and then Alford, from where it joins the A980 road and thereafter loosely follows the course of the River Don into the Cairngorms.

At a junction at Mossat, the A97 takes over as the northbound route towards Rhynie and on to Huntly. Following a section of 10 miles (16 km) as the A97 moving south-west passing Kildrummy Castle and Glenbuchat Castle, the roads split and the A944 carries on for a further 8 miles (13 km) before it eventually meets the A939 road to Tomintoul near Corgarff.

== See also ==
- New Aberdeen Stadium, a major construction project for the local football club sited alongside the A944 at the A90
