= Muirhouses, Falkirk =

Coordinates: 56.007°N 03.576°W

Muirhouses
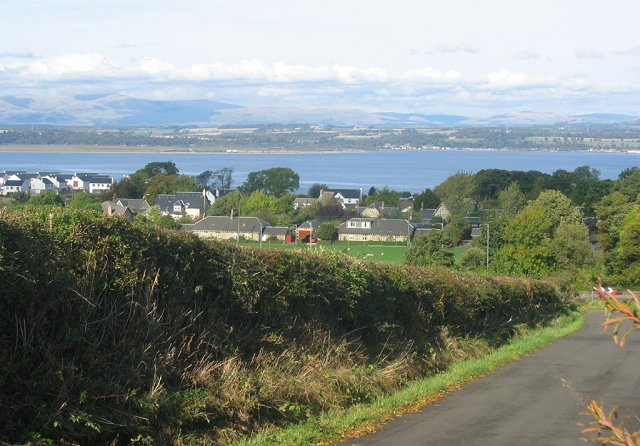
- The village of Muirhouses looking north to the River Forth and Ochil Hills.

- Location within the Falkirk council area
- Population: 235 (2001 census)
- OS grid reference: NT017804
  - Edinburgh: 15.4 mi (24.8 km) ESE
  - London: 342 mi (550 km) SSE
- Civil parish: Bo'ness and Carriden
- Council area: Falkirk
- Lieutenancy area: Stirling and Falkirk
- Country: Scotland
- Sovereign state: United Kingdom
- Post town: BO'NESS
- Postcode district: EH51
- Dialling code: 01506
- Police: Scotland
- Fire: Scottish
- Ambulance: Scottish
- UK Parliament: Bathgate and Linlithgow
- Scottish Parliament: Falkirk East
- Website: falkirk.gov.uk

Muirhouses is a small village which lies in the Falkirk council area of Scotland. The village is located 1.1 miles (1.8 km) south-east of Bo'ness, 2.1 miles (3.4 km) north-northeast of Linlithgow and 8.0 miles (12.9 km) east of Falkirk. Muirhouses sits near to the south bank of the Firth of Forth close to the council boundary line between Falkirk and West Lothian councils.

Access to the village can be gained from the south by the A993 road and from the north by the A904 road. At the time of the 2001 census the village had a population of 235 residents.

== See also ==
- Carriden House
