= Voy =

Coordinates: 59.017°N 3.296°W

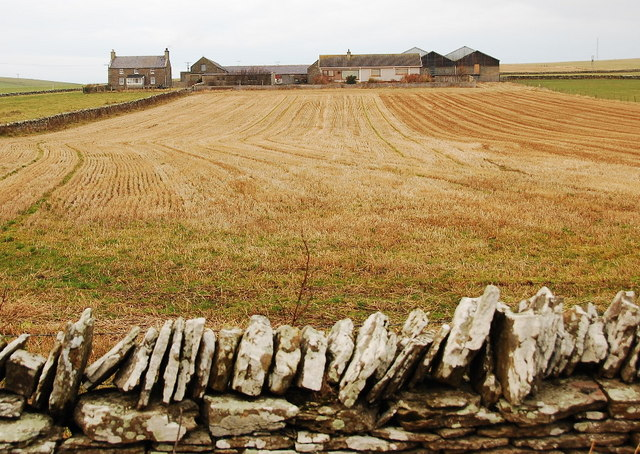
- Wester Voy, looking uphill over a field of stubble

- Location within Orkney
- OS grid reference: HY257152
- Civil parish: Sandwick
- Council area: Orkney
- Lieutenancy area: Orkney
- Country: Scotland
- Sovereign state: United Kingdom
- Post town: STROMNESS
- Postcode district: KW16
- Dialling code: 01856
- Police: Scotland
- Fire: Scottish
- Ambulance: Scottish
- UK Parliament: Orkney and Shetland
- Scottish Parliament: Orkney

Voy is a settlement in the Orkney Islands of the north of Scotland. Voy is within the parish of Sandwick. The settlement is 3 miles (5 kilometres) north of the town of Stromness, and at the junction of the B9056 with the A967.
