= Mossat =

Coordinates: 57.261°N 2.871°W

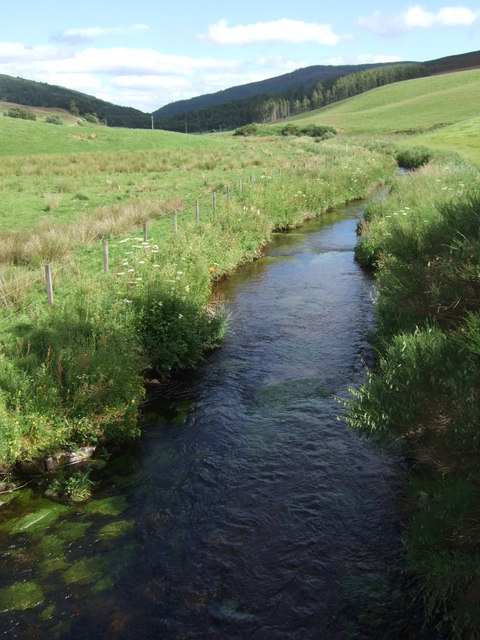
Mossat Burn from the A97 bridge

Mossat is a settlement in Aberdeenshire, Scotland on the A97 road near Glenkindie and Lumsden, between Bridge of Alford and Strathdon, and is situated on the Mossat Burn. Mossat has a garden centre, cafe and antique shop.
