= A961 road =

Road in Scotland

A961

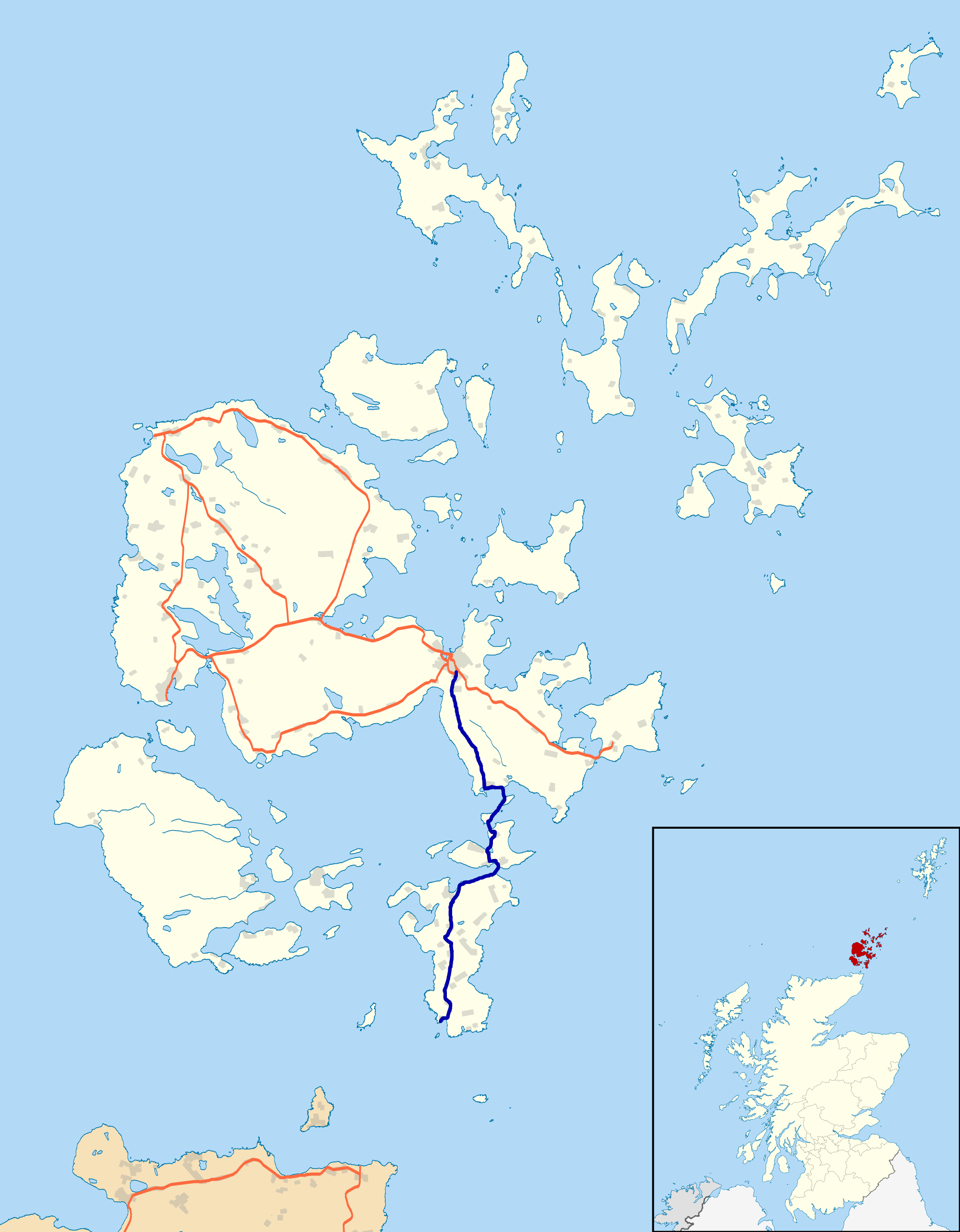

Route information
- Maintained by Orkney Islands Council
- Length: 16.72 mi (26.91 km)

Major junctions
- North end: Kirkwall; 58.9758°N 2.9537°W
- South end: Burwick; 58.7426°N 2.9700°W

Location
- Country: United Kingdom
- Constituent country: Scotland
- Major cities: Kirkwall
- Villages: St. Margaret's Hope, Burray, St. Mary's

Road network
- Roads in the United Kingdom; Motorways; A and B road zones

The A961 is a single-carriageway road on the eastern side of Scapa Flow in the Orkney Islands, connecting the town of Kirkwall on the Orkney Mainland to Burwick at the southern end of South Ronaldsay.

The road links four islands to the mainland, crossing four causeways known collectively as the Churchill Barriers, which were built during World War II as naval defences to protect the natural harbour of Scapa Flow after a successful attack by a German U-boat.

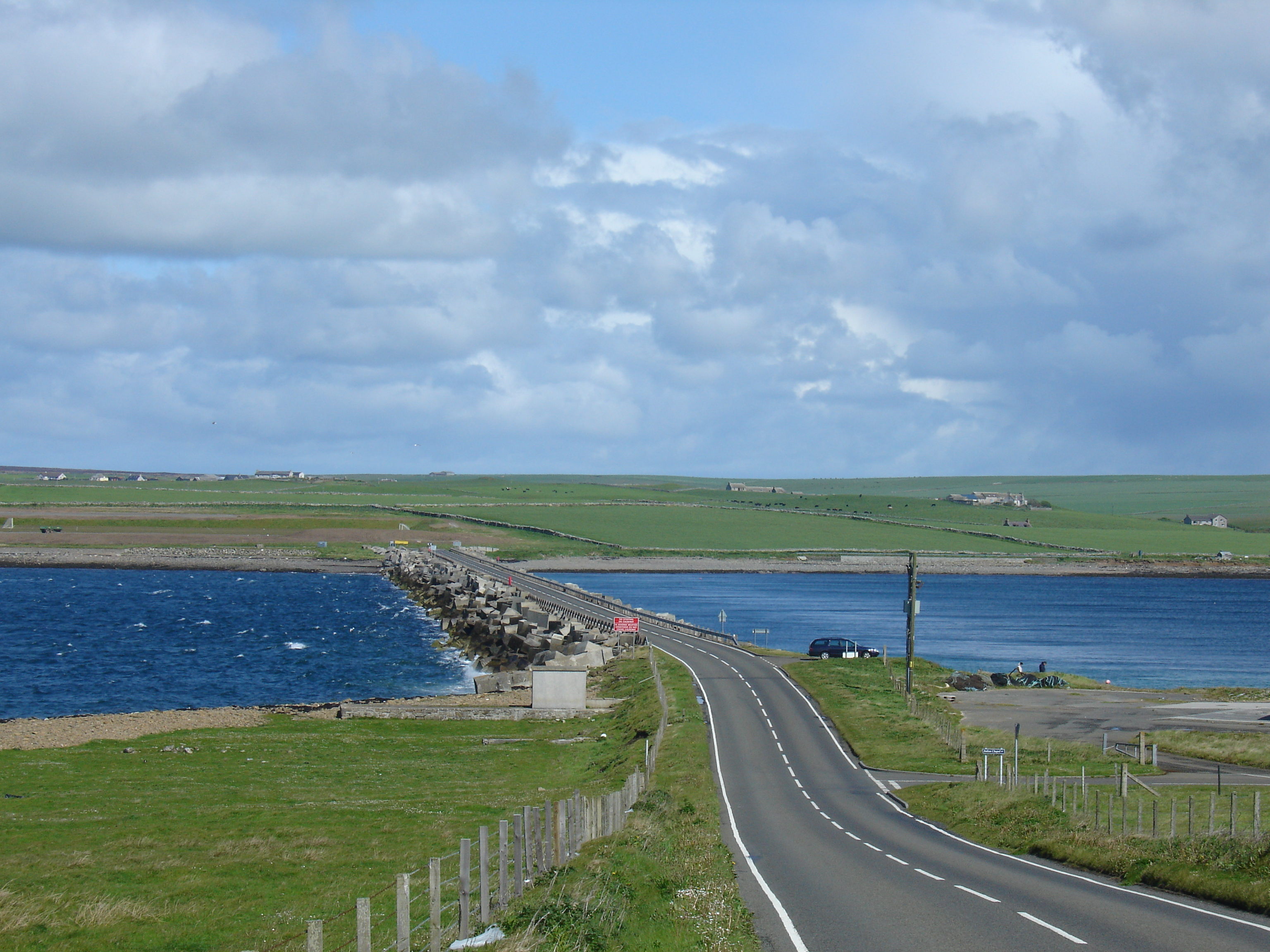
The A961 crossing the first Churchill Barrier, from Lamb Holm to Glimps Holm

Proceeding southwards from Kirkwall, the road travels south to St Mary's, from where it crosses Kirk Sound on the first Churchill Barrier to the island of Lamb Holm, site of the Italian Chapel built by the Italian prisoners of war who built the barriers.

The second barrier carries the road to the island of Glimps Holm, from where the third barrier connects to the larger island of Burray. From the southern shore of Burray, the fourth Churchill barrier (which has accumulated large sand dunes and no longer looks a barrier) passes onto the much larger South Ronaldsay, the southernmost island of Orkney. The road turns south-west to the village of St Margaret's Hope, from where it continues south to Burwick, near the southernmost point of Orkney.
