= A98 road =

Road in Scotland

Coordinates: 57.66666°N 2.47497°W

A98

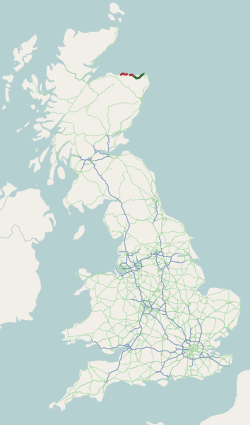

Route information
- Length: 50.7 mi (81.6 km)

Major junctions
- East end: A90 Fraserburgh A950 A947; A97 A942
- West end: A96 Fochabers

Location
- Country: United Kingdom
- Primary destinations: Elgin, Banff, Fraserburgh

Road network
- Roads in the United Kingdom; Motorways; A and B road zones
| ← A97 | → A99 |

The A98 road is a major coastal road of northeast Scotland passing through Moray and Aberdeenshire. The A98 is no longer a primary route, with this status being removed shortly after the A92 was renumbered A90.

== Route ==
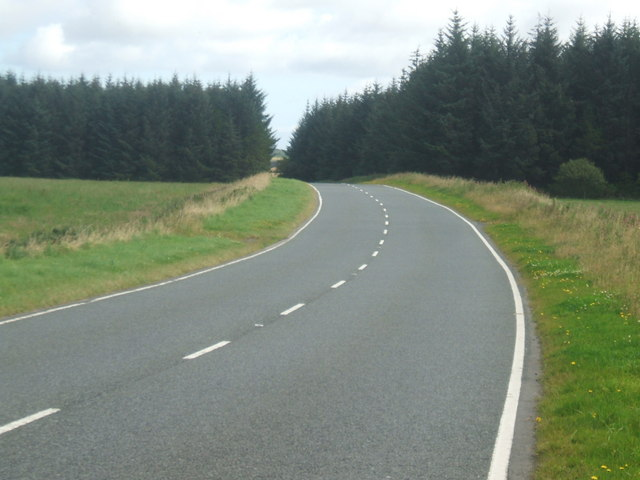
A98 near Craigmaud

It originates in the west at Fochabers at a junction with the A96, and proceeds northeast, passing close to Buckie, Findochty and Portknockie before passing through Cullen and Portsoy.

After a junction with the A95 it passes through Banff and Macduff. It then bears southeast and inland for some distance, passing near to the prehistoric monument of Longman Hill; thence it runs close to New Pitsligo before heading northeast to Fraserburgh where it terminates.
