= Bertha Park High School =

Secondary school in Perth, Perth and Kinross, Scotland

Location
- Adamson Avenue; Perth, Perth and Kinross, PH1 0AU; Scotland; 56°25′21″N 03°29′06″W

Information
- School type: State school, High school
- Founded: 2019
- Status: Currently active
- Local authority: Perth and Kinross Council
- Head teacher: Stuart Clyde
- Enrollment: 645 as of September 2024
- Education system: Secondary education
- Language: English
- Hours in school day: 6 hours 40 minutes
- Feeder schools: Auchtergaven Primary, Dunbarney Primary, Forgandenny Primary, Logiealmond Primary, Methven Primary, Pitcairn Primary, Ruthvenfield Primary
- Website: www.berthaparkhigh.org.uk

Bertha Park High School is a non-denominational state comprehensive secondary school in Perth, Scotland.

Planning for the school began in 2013 when Perth and Kinross Council voted to accept Scottish Government funding for a new school in Perth. The school opened in 2019, and was the first new high school in Scotland since 2002.

The school has a focus on digital learning and is the only school in the UK to be part of Microsoft's Flagship Schools program.

== History ==
Planning for a new school in Perth began in 2013 when Perth and Kinross Council voted to accept funding from the Scottish Government's Schools for the Future Programme. In total the project would cost £32.5 million, with the Scottish Government providing £19.6 million.

Construction work on Bertha Park High School started in December 2017. When opened it would be the first new high school in Scotland since Meldrum Academy in Aberdeenshire opened in 2002, and the first in Perth and Kinross since 1972, with other new school buildings having been replacements for pre-existing ones.

The School opened for classes in August 2019, and this was followed by an official opening on 16 January 2020 where Scottish Education Secretary and local MSP John Swinney unveiled an official plaque to commemorate the event. Its first and current Headmaster is Mr Stuart Clyde.

== Grounds and facilities ==
Located on the northern outskirts of Perth the school building is arranged on a north–south axis, with the northern end of the building designed to put learning on show with a taller, highly glazed frontage. In contrast, the rear of the building is lower and backs on to a south-facing playground, in turn, linked to the neighbouring residential area.

Upon opening the school facilities included a sports hall, multi-use games hall, gym, synthetic sports pitches, and an amphitheatre.

== Curriculum and teaching ==
As a state school in Scotland, Bertha Park teaches the Curriculum for Excellence, as set out by the Scottish Government.

The school is unusual in the local area as only teaching four subjects a day, and has an emphasis on digital learning. This was supported by the provision of iPads to all the students when the school opened, provided as part of a two-year research project by the University of the Highlands and Islands intended to study the effect of such devices being used within teaching and learning. The local council intends to use the results of this study to examine the benefits of this approach into the future. At the same time, students are required to lock their own phones in lockers during school hours, which the school says will improve their learning, with the content available via the iPads being restricted by the council and teachers being able to control their use in class.

== Awards and recognition ==
In September 2018 it was announced that the school would be one of the first 17 Microsoft Flagship Schools, where it is hoped schools will be able to innovate new ways of using technology in teaching. Bertha Park was the only school in the UK to be selected.

In 2019 the school won the Scottish Transforming Learning Award.

== General sources ==
- Anderson, Kathryn (17 January 2020). "Students show off brilliant Bertha Park High School in Perth". Daily Record.
- Clark, Rachel (5 July 2019a). "'A whole new way of learning' at Bertha Park". Daily Record.
- Clark, Rachel (23 August 2019b). "Very special start to term at Bertha Park High School in Perth". Daily Record.
- The Good Schools Guide (23 October 2018). "Scottish education system". The Good Schools Guide.
- Maher, Ryan (6 July 2018). "Perth's newest secondary Bertha Park High School ahead of schedule". The Courier.
- O'Sullivan, Kevin (17 July 2019). "Scotland's newest high school to lock down pupils' phones as part of social media 'detox' plan". FutureScot.
- Perth & Kinross Council (26 October 2017). "Proposals and statutory consultation for the establishment of a new Secondary School at Bertha Park, Perth". Perth & Kinross Council.
- Perth & Kinross Council (30 May 2024). "Bertha Park High School". Perth & Kinross Council.
- RIBA (5 June 2020). "Bertha Park High School, Perth". The RIBA Journal.
- Salcito, Anthony (18 September 2018). "These are the first Microsoft Flagship Schools". educationblog.microsoft.com.
- Scottish Construction Now (23 July 2019). "New £32.5m Perth secondary school handed over". Scottish Construction Now.
- Scottish Construction Now (9 January 2020). "Deanestor completes £1.5m furniture and fit out at Bertha Park High School". Scottish Construction Now.
- Seith, Emma (27 July 2019). "The school with breaks after every lesson and no phones". Tes.
- Urban Realm (2019). "Bertha Park High School". Urban Realm.

== External links section ==
- School Website
- Council page for school
