= A980 road =

Road in Scotland

Coordinates: 57.14632°N 2.72401°W

A980

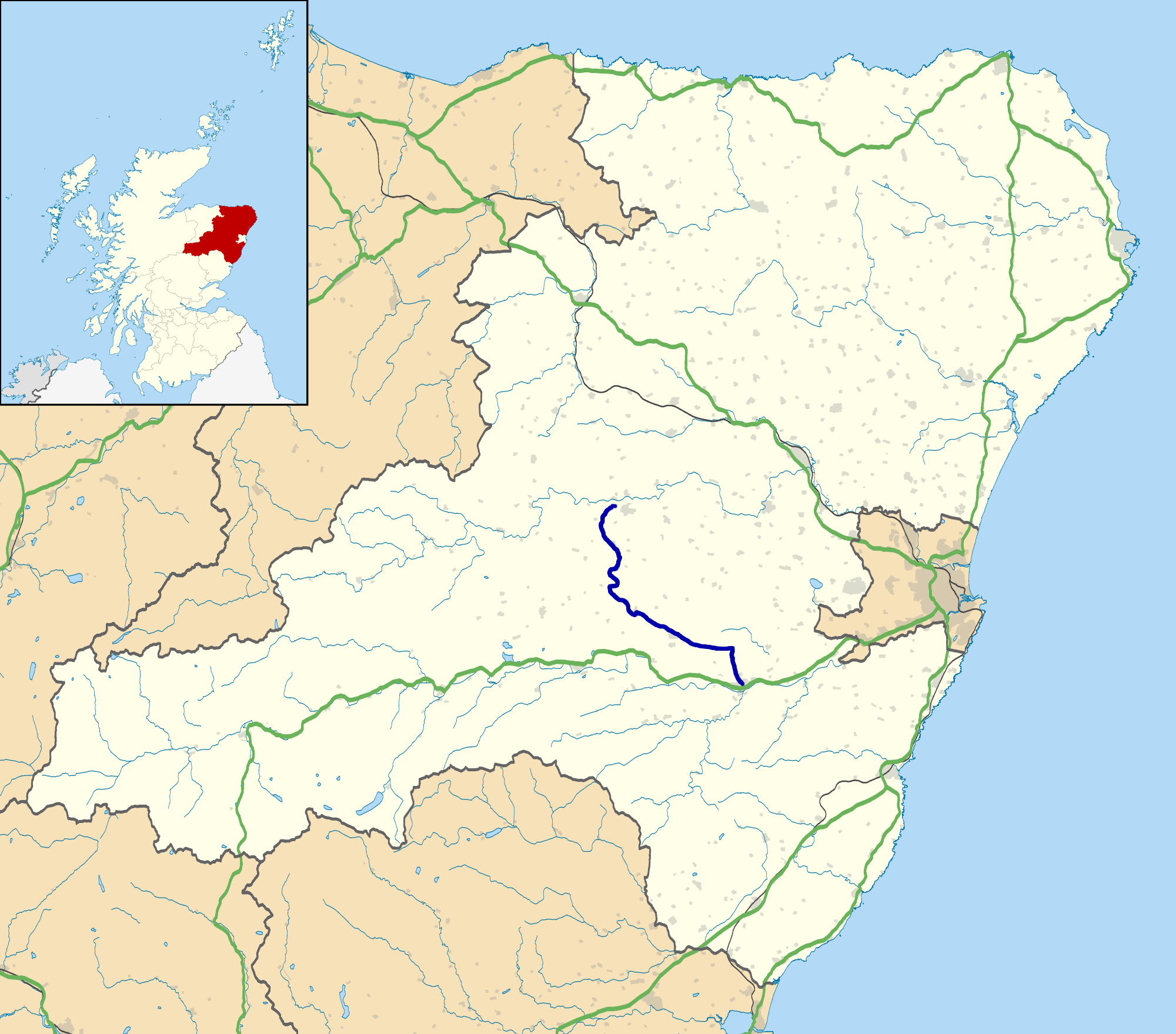

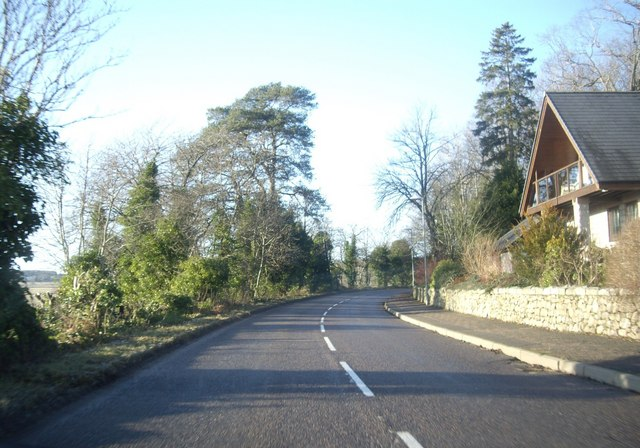
- The A980 heading west from Torphins

Route information
- Length: 20.6 mi (33.2 km)

Location
- Country: United Kingdom
- Constituent country: Scotland

Road network
- Roads in the United Kingdom; Motorways; A and B road zones

The A980 road is a relatively short 20.6-mile (33.2 km) main road in north-east Scotland.

The A980 connects the A944 road with the trunk A93 road.

== Route ==
North to South

- A944 between Alford, Aberdeenshire and Bridge of Alford
- Muir of Fowlis
- Craigievar Castle
- Crossroads
- Lumphanan
- Torphins
- Milltown of Campfield
- Banchory, junction with the A93
