= Torphins =

Coordinates: 57°6′18″N 2°37′22″W

Torphins: Scottish Gaelic: Tòrr Fionn
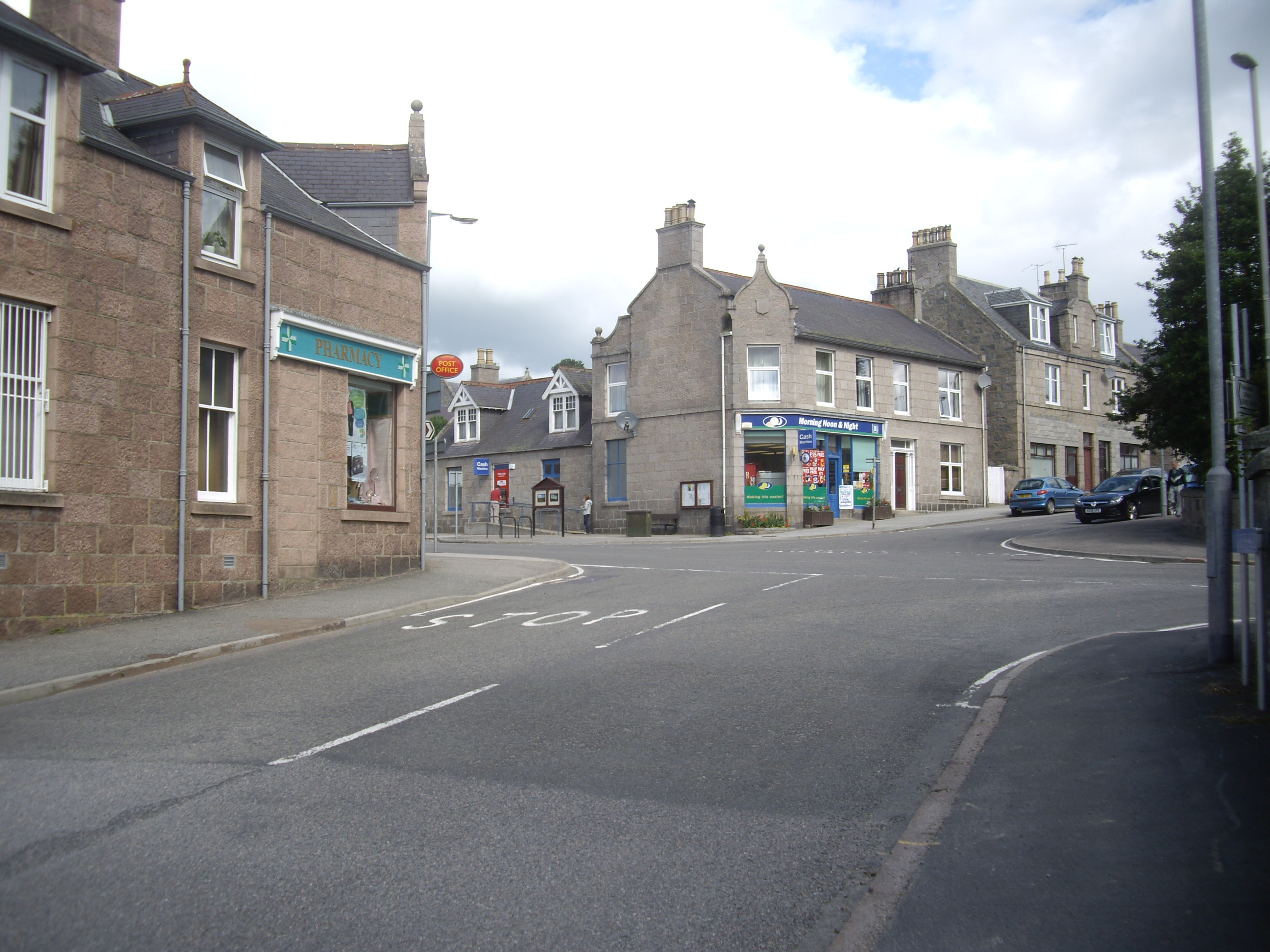
- Torphins Village Crossroads

- Location within Aberdeenshire
- Population: 1,370 (2020)
- OS grid reference: NJ6219
- Council area: Aberdeenshire
- Country: Scotland
- Sovereign state: United Kingdom
- Post town: BANCHORY
- Postcode district: AB31
- Dialling code: 01339
- Police: Scotland
- Fire: Scottish
- Ambulance: Scottish
- UK Parliament: West Aberdeenshire and Kincardine
- Scottish Parliament: Aberdeenshire West

Torphins (/tɔːrˈfɪnz/ tor-FINZ; Scottish Gaelic: Tòrr Fionn) is a village in Royal Deeside, Aberdeenshire, Scotland which lies about 22 miles (35 km) west of Aberdeen. It is situated on the A980, about 7 miles (11 km) north-west of Banchory, and was once served by the Great North of Scotland Railway.

With a population of around 1,400, it is one of the larger villages in Deeside.

== Toponymy ==
The name Torphins may come from the Gaelic Torr Fionn, meaning fair/white hill, or as a corruption of Tor Feithachan, meaning hill of the bogs. Another less likely namesake is Thorfinn Sigurdsson, Earl of Orkney, who might have passed through the area due to his partnership with Macbeth. It appeared on maps in 1750 under the name Turfins.

== Amenities ==
The village has many facilities including a primary school (with about 250 pupils attending each year), a large park with play area, a car dealer, a hairdressers, two tennis courts, a bowling green and a doctor's surgery. There are also a variety of shops in Torphins including a charity shop, a Scotmid store, a beauty salon, a Chinese and Thai takeaway and a chemist. There is a Church of Scotland church, which is part of the Mid Deeside United Churches alongside those in Kincardine O'Neil and Lumphanan. Torphins also has its own Town Hall - the Learney Hall. It also has a public house/Indian restaurant, the Learney Arms Indian, which was originally part of a hotel. The hotel and pub was closed in 2015 with plans to turn the building into a residential dwelling, despite local objection. The pub was later reopened in 2016 but the hotel remained closed. The pub closed again briefly before being converted into an Indian restaurant and bar. The hotel no longer exists being converted into a private dwelling house and renamed The Gatsby.

Torphins was home to a War Memorial Maternity Hospital. As a result, many notable people from Deeside have been born in Torphins. The building, however, has recently become a GP clinic, and no longer offers maternity facilities.

Walkers Shortbread was founded in the village by Joseph Walker in 1898.

There is a 9-hole golf course located about a mile outside of Torphins.

== Public transport ==
The Stagecoach Bluebird 201 and 202 buses provide service to Aberdeen. There are other infrequent connections on the 413, and the Royal Mail PB74 postbus. Torphins railway station on the Deeside Railway served the village from 1859 to 1966.

== Notable people ==
- Moray Low (born 1984), international rugby player
- Stewart Milne (born 1950), former chairman of Aberdeen F.C.

== Sport ==
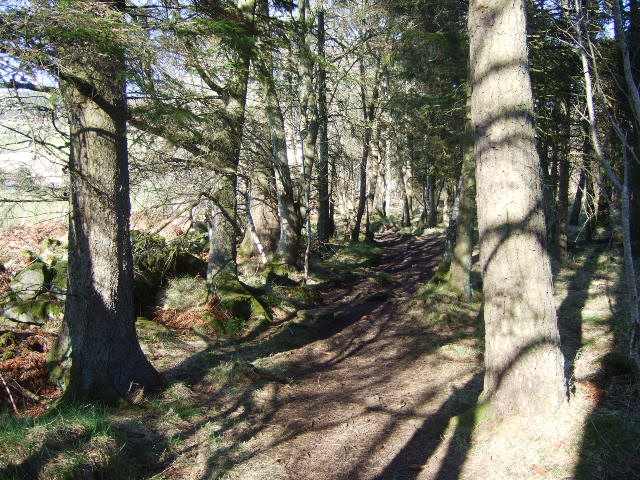
The Torphins Wood

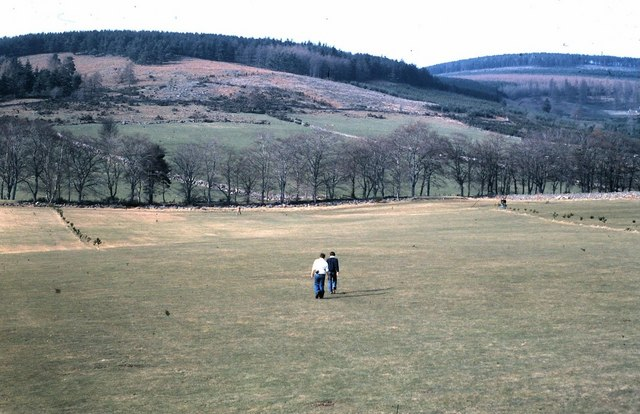
Torphins golf course

Torphins also has a tennis club, a lawn bowls club and a seasonal curling rink.
