= A921 road =

Road in Scotland

Coordinates: 56°07′07″N 3°11′24″W

A921

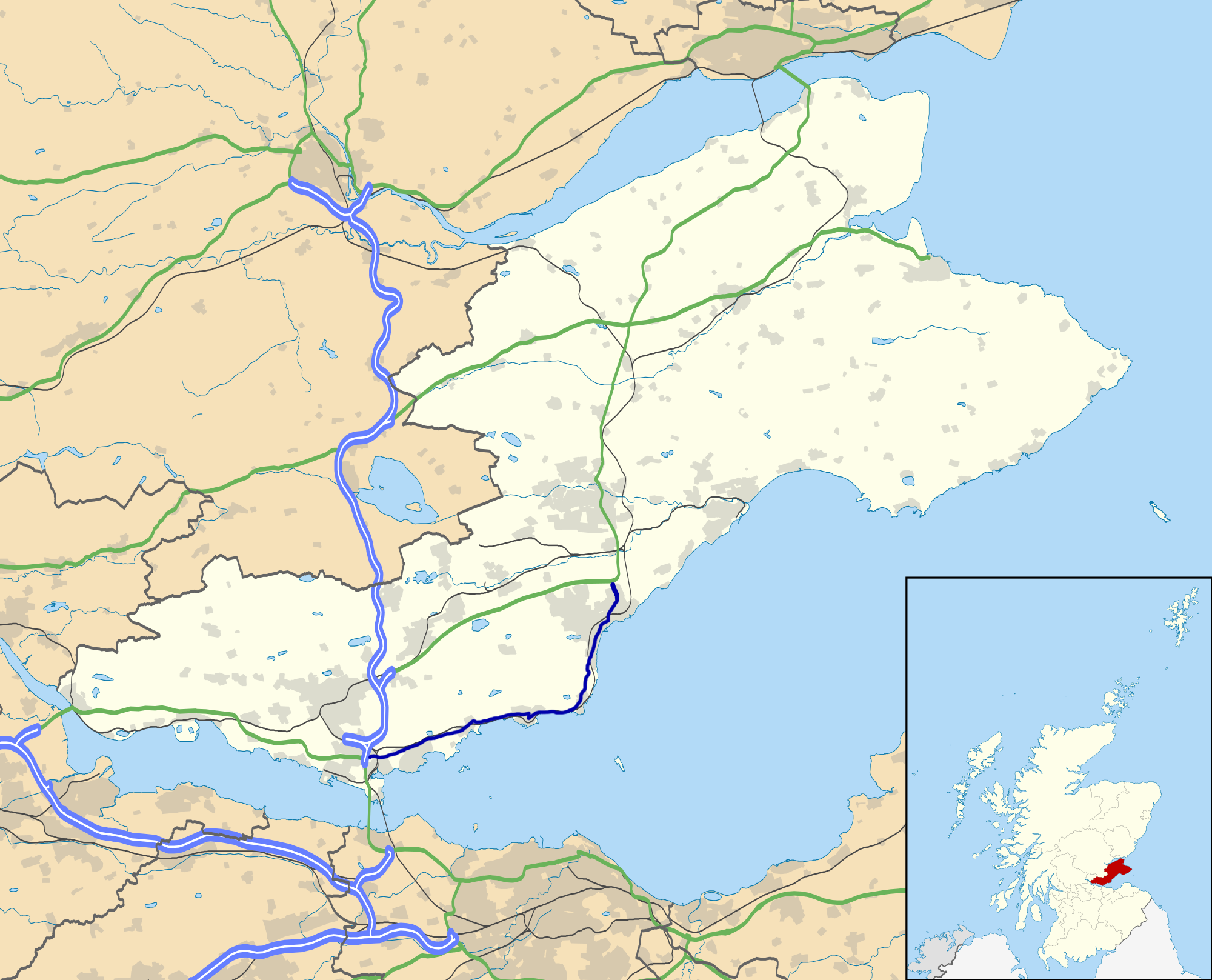

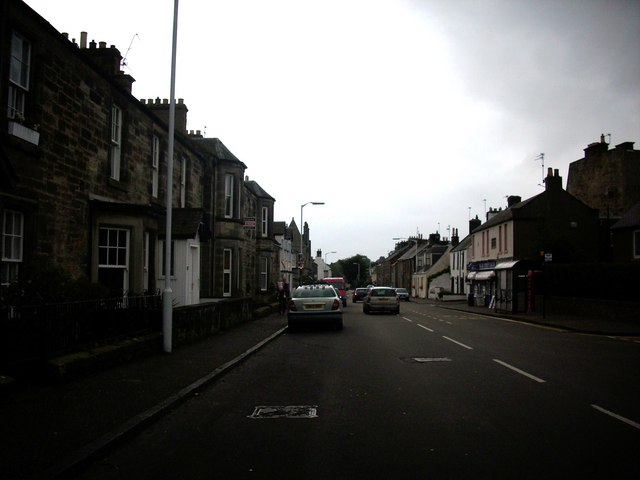
- The A921 in Aberdour

Route information
- Length: 16.0 mi (25.7 km)

Major junctions
- west end: Inverkeithing
- east end: Kirkcaldy

Location
- Country: United Kingdom
- Constituent country: Scotland

Road network
- Roads in the United Kingdom; Motorways; A and B road zones

The A921 road is a coastal road between the A92 in Kirkcaldy and Rosyth, the A985 and the M90 in Fife, Scotland. Before 1990, the road was classed as the A92.

It passes through the towns and villages of Inverkeithing, Dalgety Bay, Aberdour, Burntisland, Kinghorn and Kirkcaldy. It previously went through the village of Hillend but it was bypassed in 1993.
