= Bridge of Alford =

Village in Aberdeenshire, Scotland

Coordinates: 57°14′N 2°44′W

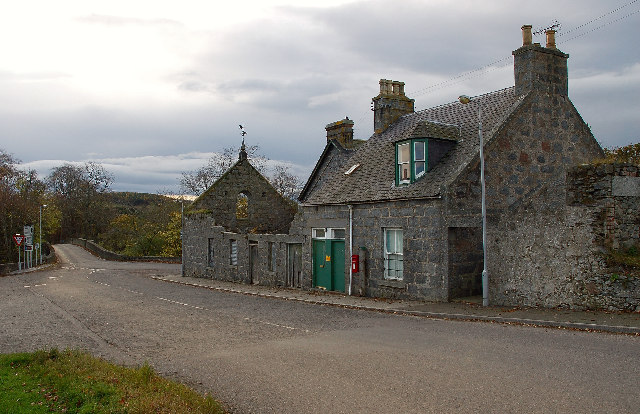
Bridge of Alford

Bridge of Alford is a village in Aberdeenshire, Scotland.

Bridge of Alford is situated near Alford beside the bridge over the River Don. It is on the road towards Strathdon.
