= A985 road (Scotland) =

Road in Scotland

A985

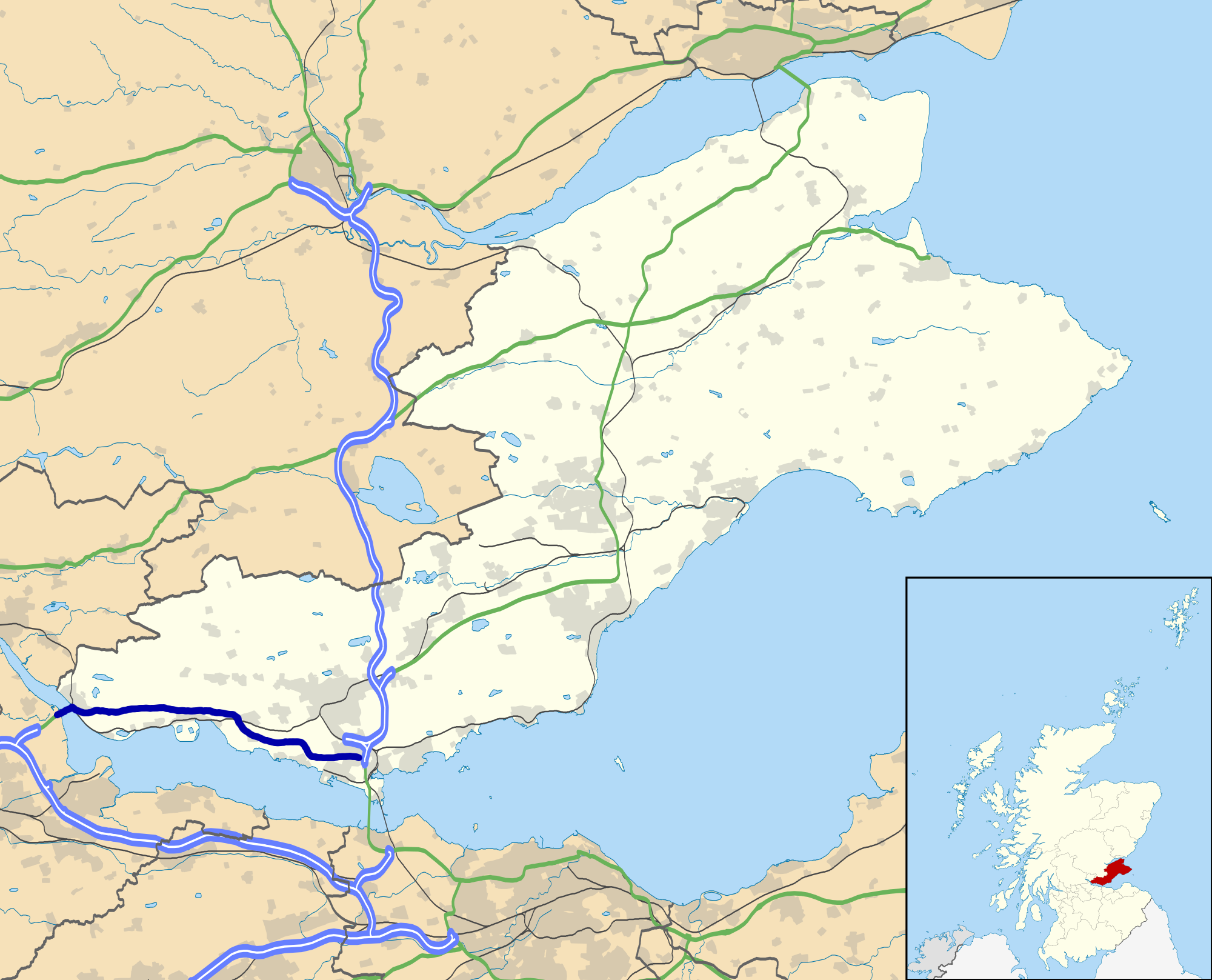

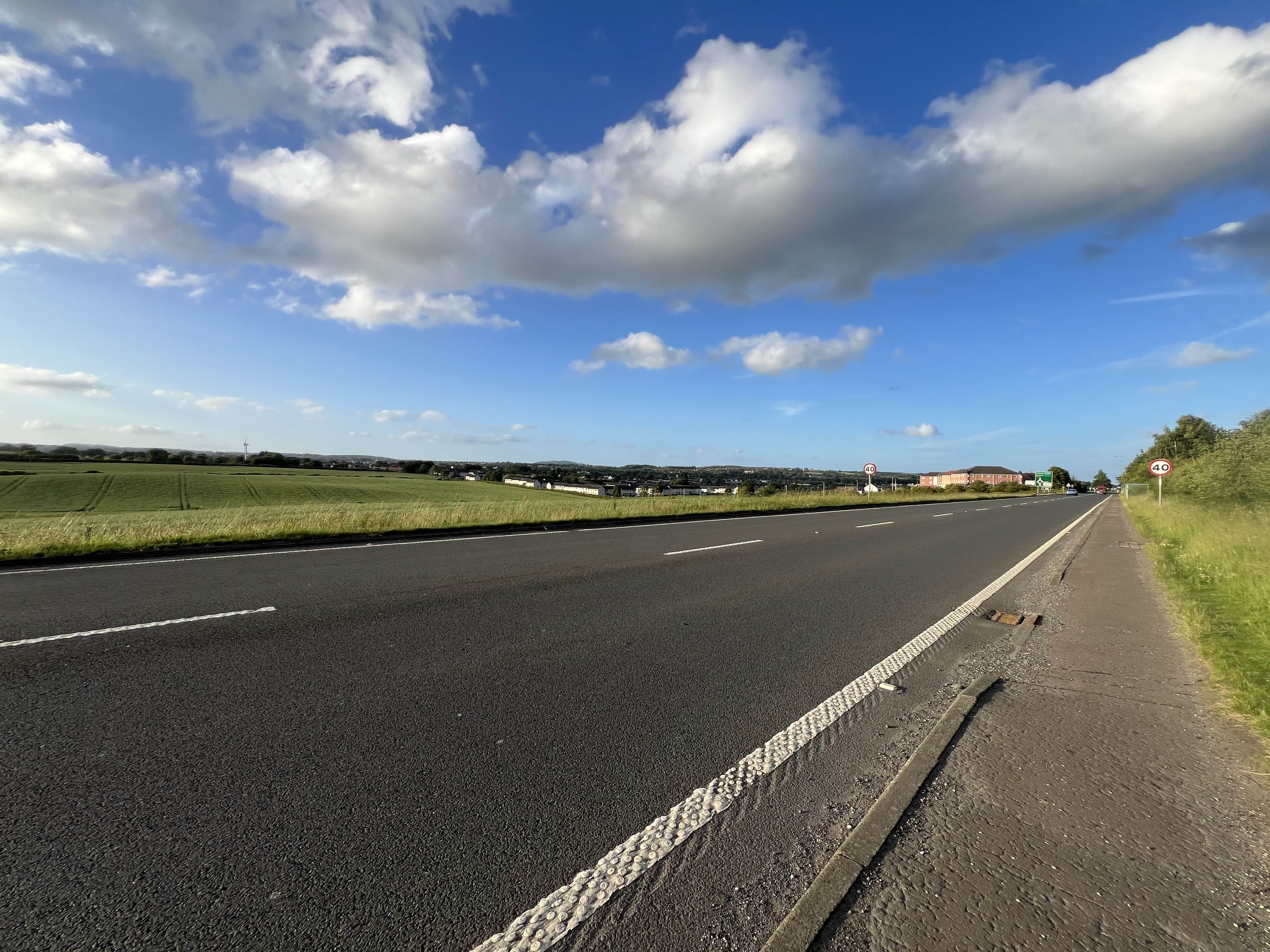
- A985 entering Rosyth

Route information
- Length: 14.8 mi (23.8 km)

Major junctions
- West end: Kincardine Bridge
- Cairneyhill Roundabout (to Dunfermline)
- East end: Rosyth

Location
- Country: United Kingdom
- Constituent country: Scotland
- Primary destinations: Rosyth, Kincardine, Valleyfield, Cairneyhill, Limekilns

Road network
- Roads in the United Kingdom; Motorways; A and B road zones

The A985 is a trunk road between Rosyth, the M90 and the A921 connecting with Kincardine and the Kincardine Bridge in Fife, Scotland. It is the main link between Dunfermline and the west of Scotland.

The Kincardine Bridge which is part of the A985 opened on 29 October 1936. The bridge received Category A listed status in 2005.

The western end of the A985 in Kincardine links up with the A876 and the M876 towards the M9 towards Stirling and Edinburgh and the M80 towards Glasgow.

The eastern end in Rosyth links up with the A921 towards Kirkcaldy and eastern Fife and the M90 towards Edinburgh, Dunfermline, Kinross and Perth as well as the A9,A92 and the A90.

The A985 goes past the towns and villages of Kincardine, Culross, Valleyfield, Cairneyhill, Crombie, Charlestown, Limekilns, and Rosyth.

The Rosyth section of the A985 was subject to a temporary 18-month speed restriction from 30 to 20 mph (48 to 32 km/h) on 4 November 2024, to enhance road safety and align with the national 20 mph strategy. The temporary restriction will end on 4 May 2026.
