= North Roe =

Coordinates: 60.589°N 1.334°W

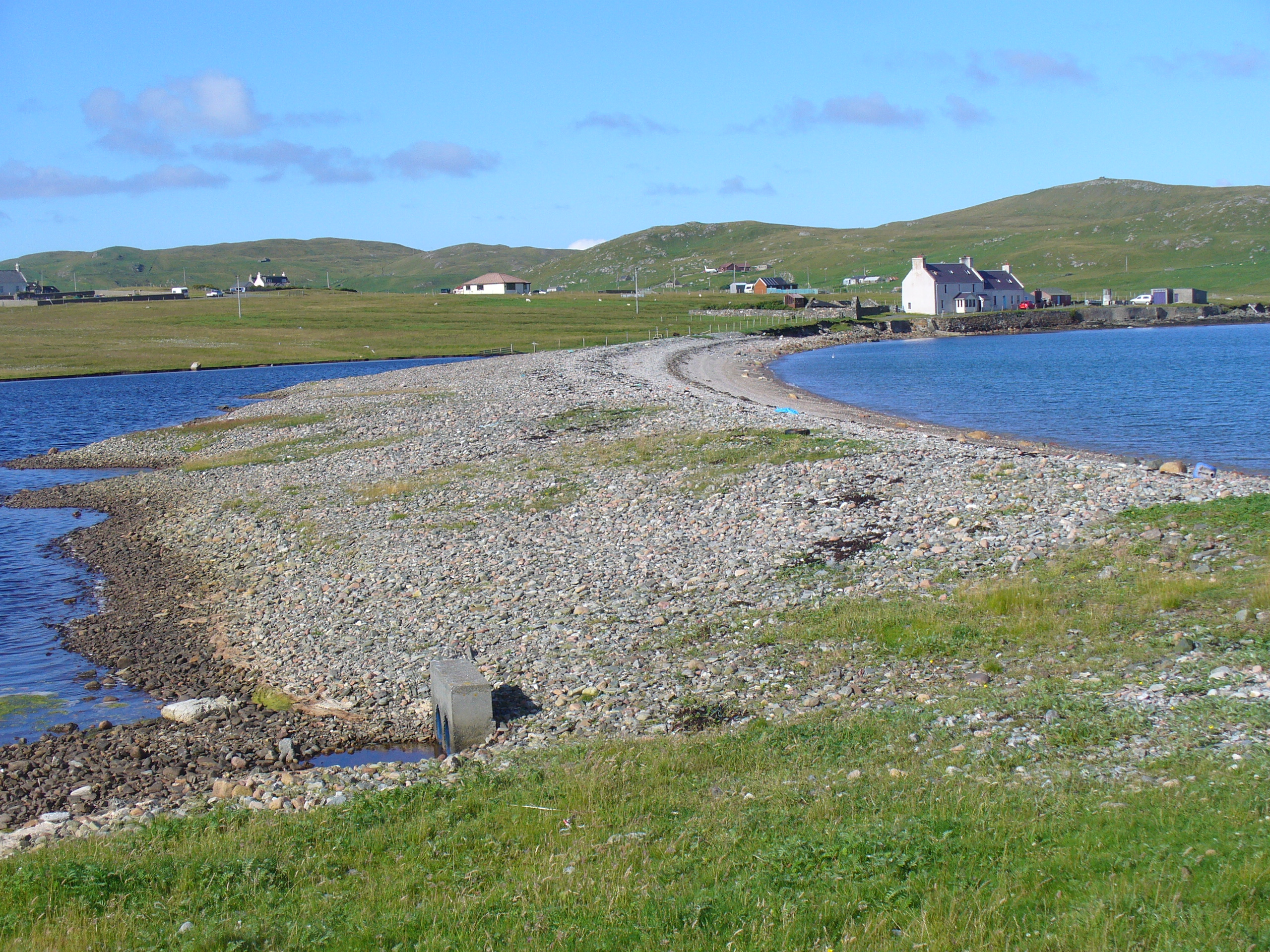
- Muckle Ayre at North Roe

- Location within Shetland
- OS grid reference: HU364896
- Civil parish: Northmaven
- Council area: Shetland
- Lieutenancy area: Shetland
- Country: Scotland
- Sovereign state: United Kingdom
- Post town: SHETLAND
- Postcode district: ZE2 9
- Dialling code: 01806
- Police: Scotland
- Fire: Scottish
- Ambulance: Scottish
- UK Parliament: Orkney and Shetland
- Scottish Parliament: Shetland

Ramsar Wetland
- Official name: Ronas Hill - North Roe & Tingon
- Designated: 11 August 1997
- Reference no.: 916

North Roe (Shaetlan pronunciation: [ˌnɑrt ˈrøː]) is a village, and protected area at the northern tip in the large Northmavine peninsula of the Mainland of Shetland, Scotland. It is a small village, with a school with fewer than a dozen pupils in 2011. The village is served by the A970 road which runs the length of the Shetland mainland from south to north and is a single-carriageway for the final nine miles.

== Environment ==
The moorland plateau to the south-west of the settlement is part of the Ronas Hill-North Roe and Tingon internationally recognised wetland site, protected under the terms of the Ramsar Convention on Wetlands, and also a Special Protection Area under the Birds Directive. It has been designated as an Important Bird Area (IBA) by BirdLife International because it supports a suite of moorland-breeding birds, including red-throated loons, great skuas and merlins.
