= A970 road =

Road in Scotland

A970

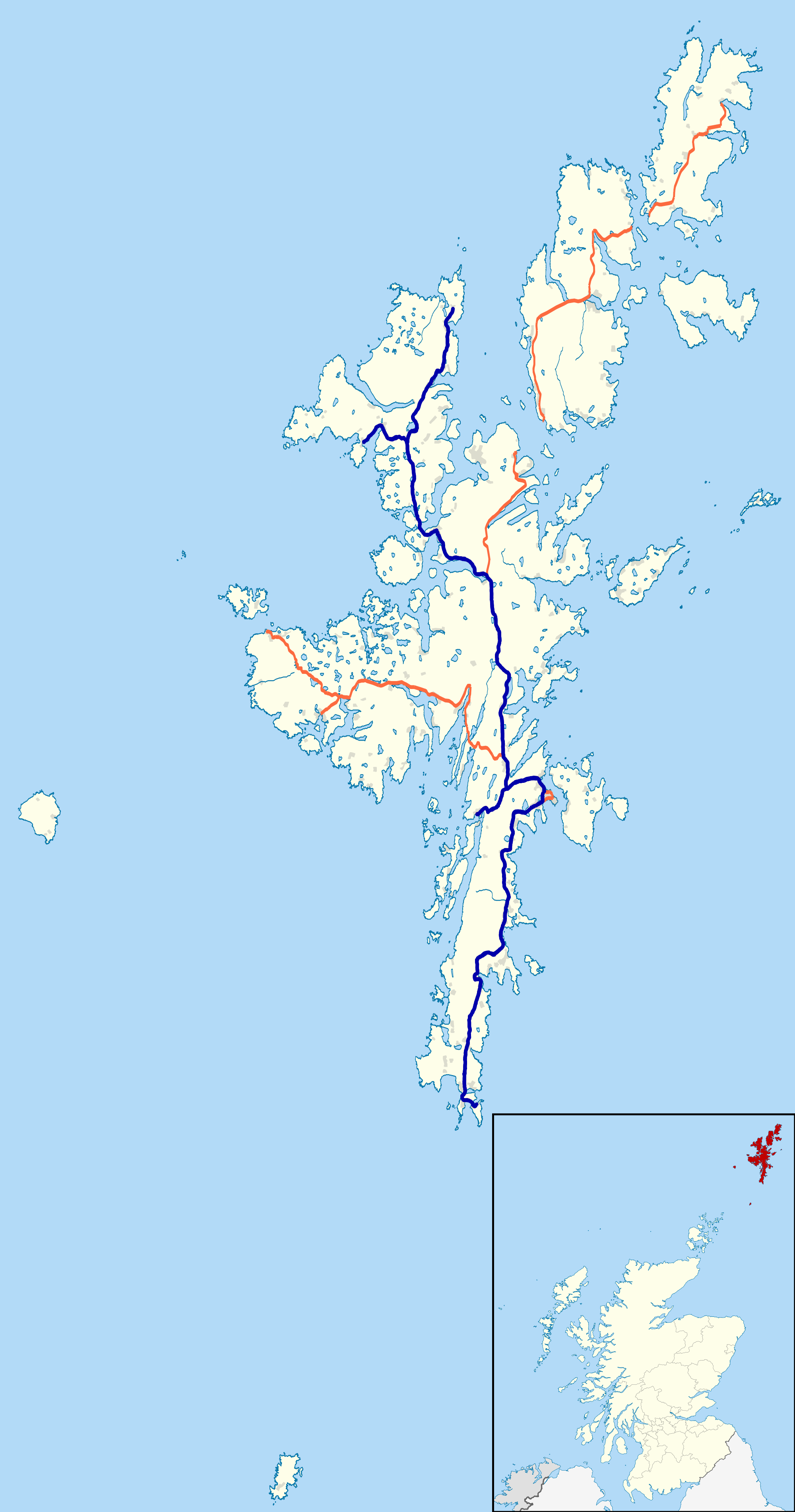

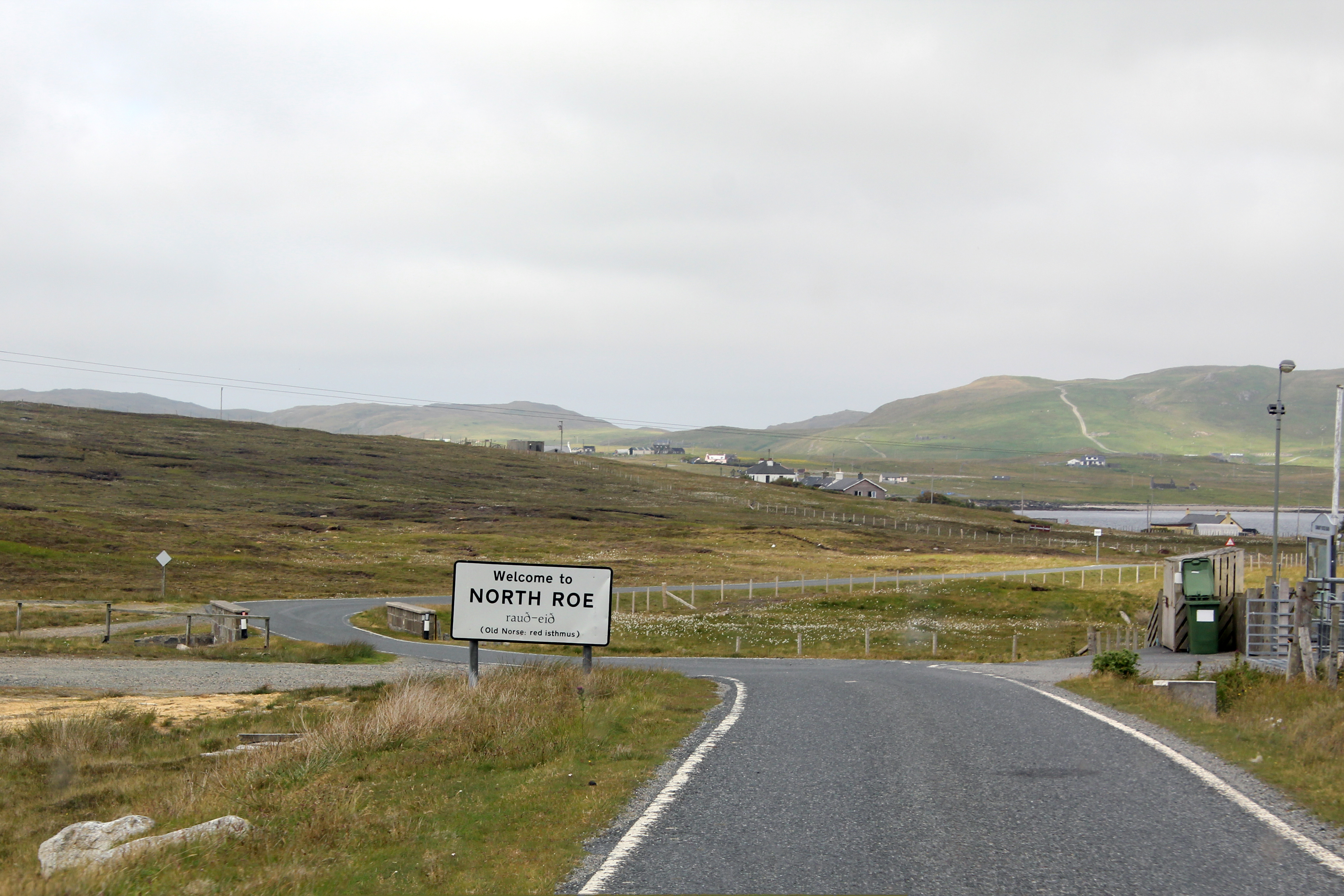

Major junctions
- North end: North Roe
- South end: Sumburgh

Location
- Country: United Kingdom
- Constituent country: Scotland
- Primary destinations: Lerwick, Scalloway, Hillswick

Road network
- Roads in the United Kingdom; Motorways; A and B road zones

The A970 is a single-carriageway road that runs from south to north of Mainland Shetland, Scotland. The road also spurs to Scalloway and North Roe.

Road crossing of A970 with Sumburgh airport's runway. The movable barrier is closed when aircraft land or take off.

The road crosses the end of a runway at Sumburgh Airport. The road is closed with barriers when flights are taking off or landing.
