= Burwick, Orkney =

Coordinates: 58.740°N 2.973°W

Burwick
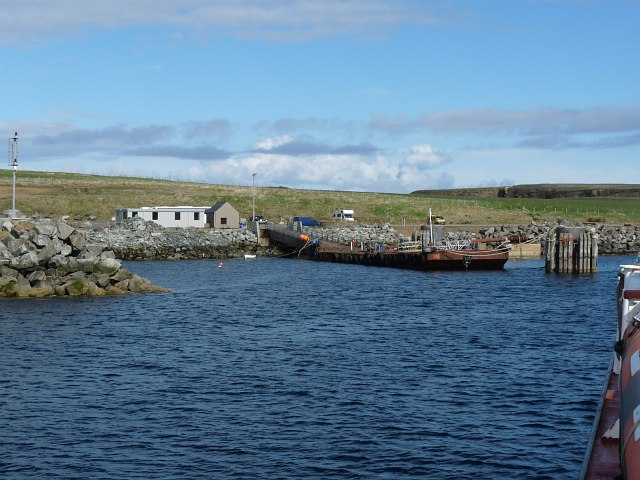
- Approaching Burwick Ferry Terminal on the Pentland Venture, May 2011

- Location within Orkney
- OS grid reference: ND436839
- Civil parish: South Ronaldsay and Burray
- Council area: Orkney
- Lieutenancy area: Orkney
- Country: Scotland
- Sovereign state: United Kingdom
- Post town: ORKNEY
- Postcode district: KW17
- Dialling code: 01856
- Police: Scotland
- Fire: Scottish
- Ambulance: Scottish
- UK Parliament: Orkney and Shetland
- Scottish Parliament: Orkney

Burwick (/ˈbʌrwɪk/) is a small harbour on the island of South Ronaldsay in the Orkney Islands, Scotland. It is the closest Orkney harbour to the Scottish mainland and was the terminus of a passenger ferry which operated in the summer to John o' Groats in Caithness.

The name was first recorded in about 1225 as "Bardvik", derived from the Old Norse bar vík, meaning "bay of the extremity", for its position near the southernmost point of the island.

The remains of the Castle of Burwick, a defended Iron Age fort and probable secondary monastic settlement, occupy the promontory west of the harbour.
