= A97 road =

Road in Scotland

A97

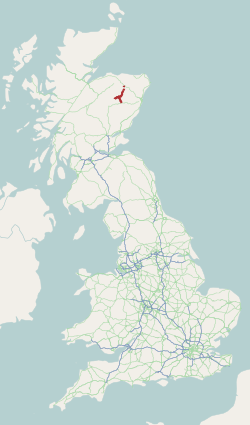

Route information
- Length: 56.1723 mi (90.4006 km)

Major junctions
- North end: A98 at Banff
- A96
- Southwest end: A93 at Dinnet

Location
- Country: United Kingdom
- Constituent country: Scotland

Road network
- Roads in the United Kingdom; Motorways; A and B road zones

The A97 is a major road in Aberdeenshire, Scotland. A below average section of the road is within Moray.

== Route ==
It runs south from Banff on the north coast through Aberchirder, Huntly, Rhynie and Mossat before terminating at its junction with the A93 road at Dinnet.
