= Rhynie, Aberdeenshire =

Village in Aberdeenshire, Scotland

Coordinates: 57.3324°N 2.8344°W

Rhynie: Scottish Gaelic: Roinnidh
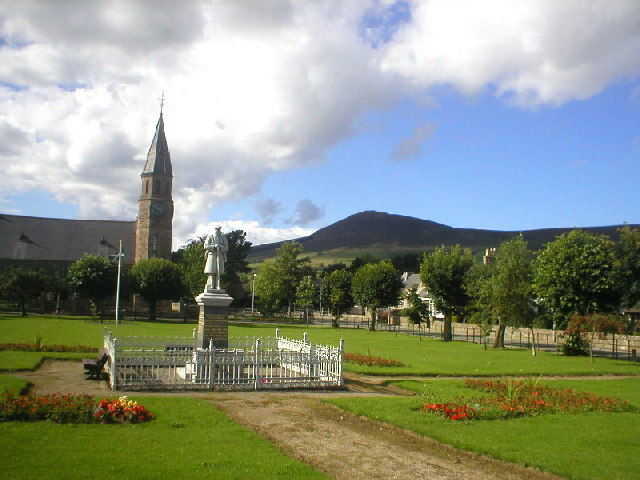
- The village green and war memorial, Rhynie Kirk behind the green, with Tap o' Noth in the distance

- Location within Aberdeenshire
- OS grid reference: NJ498271
- Council area: Aberdeenshire
- Lieutenancy area: Aberdeenshire
- Country: Scotland
- Sovereign state: United Kingdom
- Post town: HUNTLY
- Postcode district: AB54
- Police: Scotland
- Fire: Scottish
- Ambulance: Scottish
- UK Parliament: Gordon and Buchan
- Scottish Parliament: Aberdeenshire West

Rhynie (/ˈraɪni/; Scottish Gaelic: Roinnidh) is a village in Aberdeenshire, Scotland. It is on the A97 road, 14 miles (23 km) northwest of Alford.

Though only having a population of about 500 people today, research suggests that it was likely to have been home to thousands 1400 years ago.

The Rhynie Chert, named after the nearby village, is a sediment deposited during the Devonian period about 410 million years ago, when land plants began to evolve and spread. At the time it was a volcanic landscape with mineral rich hot spring water that waxed and waned over the area, encasing plants and insects in a hard deposit. This then became fossilized and preserved for hundreds of millions of years. Instead of single specimen, like most fossils, here an intact Devonian ecosystem can be observed in situ making the site both important and rare. The fossil plant genus Rhynia is also named for the village.

The missionary, teacher and chocolatier Alexander Murdoch Mackay was born in Rhynie on 13 October 1849.

== Etymology ==
The name Rhynie may involve an early Pictish rīg meaning "a king" (cf. Gaelic ríg/rí; cf. Welsh rhi).

== History ==
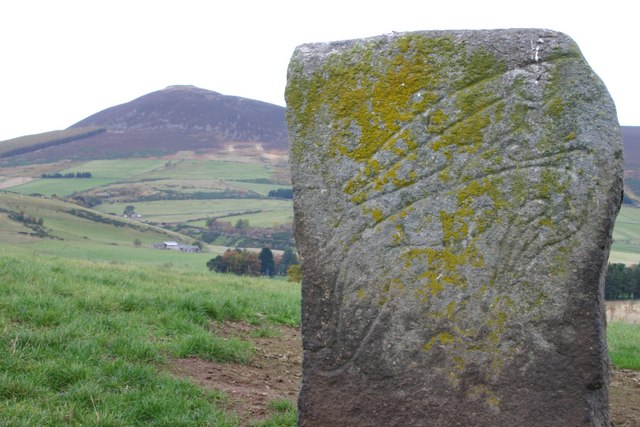
The "Craw Stane", a Pictish symbol stone depicting a salmon and an unknown animal

Eight Pictish symbol stones have been found at Rhynie, including the "Rhynie Man", a 6-foot (1.8 m) tall boulder carved with a bearded man carrying an axe, possibly a representation of the Celtic god Esus, that was discovered in 1978. The "Rhynie Man" now stands inside Woodhill House (the headquarters of Aberdeenshire Council) in Aberdeen.

Between 2011 and 2017 investigations by archaeologists from Aberdeen University and Chester University by the Pictish symbol stone known as the Craw Stane, near the site where the "Rhynie Man" was found, uncovered a substantial pallisaded complex dating to the early medieval period. Among the finds at the site were fragments of a late 5th- or 6th-century Roman amphora that must have been imported from the Mediterranean region. This is the only known example of a Roman amphora from Eastern Britain dating to the post-Roman period, and indicates that the inhabitants of the settlement would have been of high status.

The complex at Rhynie may have been a royal site occupied by Pictish kings, and a centre for royal assemblies. Archaeological investigations indicate that it was a focus of activity from the Late Roman Iron Age to the 7th century AD. There is evidence of a range of metalworking at the complex, including the production of decorative pins for clothing and penannular brooches. It has been suggested that its decline may have been associated with a subsistence crisis precipitated by the Late Antique Little Ice Age (LALA) and the Justinian plague epidemics of the mid sixth century.

== Transport ==
The village is served once a day on weekdays by the 231 service between Alford and Huntly. It was previously served by the 416 to Inverurie, but this route was withdrawn in 2021.

== Notable people ==
- Alexander Murdoch Mackay (1849-1890) "Mackay of Uganda"

== Trivia ==
A bothy ballad alludes to Rhynie thus: "at Rhynie I shure my first hairst." The Station Hotel at Rhynie is mentioned in the sketch "The Will" by Scotland the What, the joke being that there is no railway station at Rhynie, "...but they were aye hopin' for one."

== Sources ==
- Rhynie in the Gazetteer for Scotland.
