= A947 road =

Road in Scotland

Coordinates: 57.41353°N 2.36678°W

A947

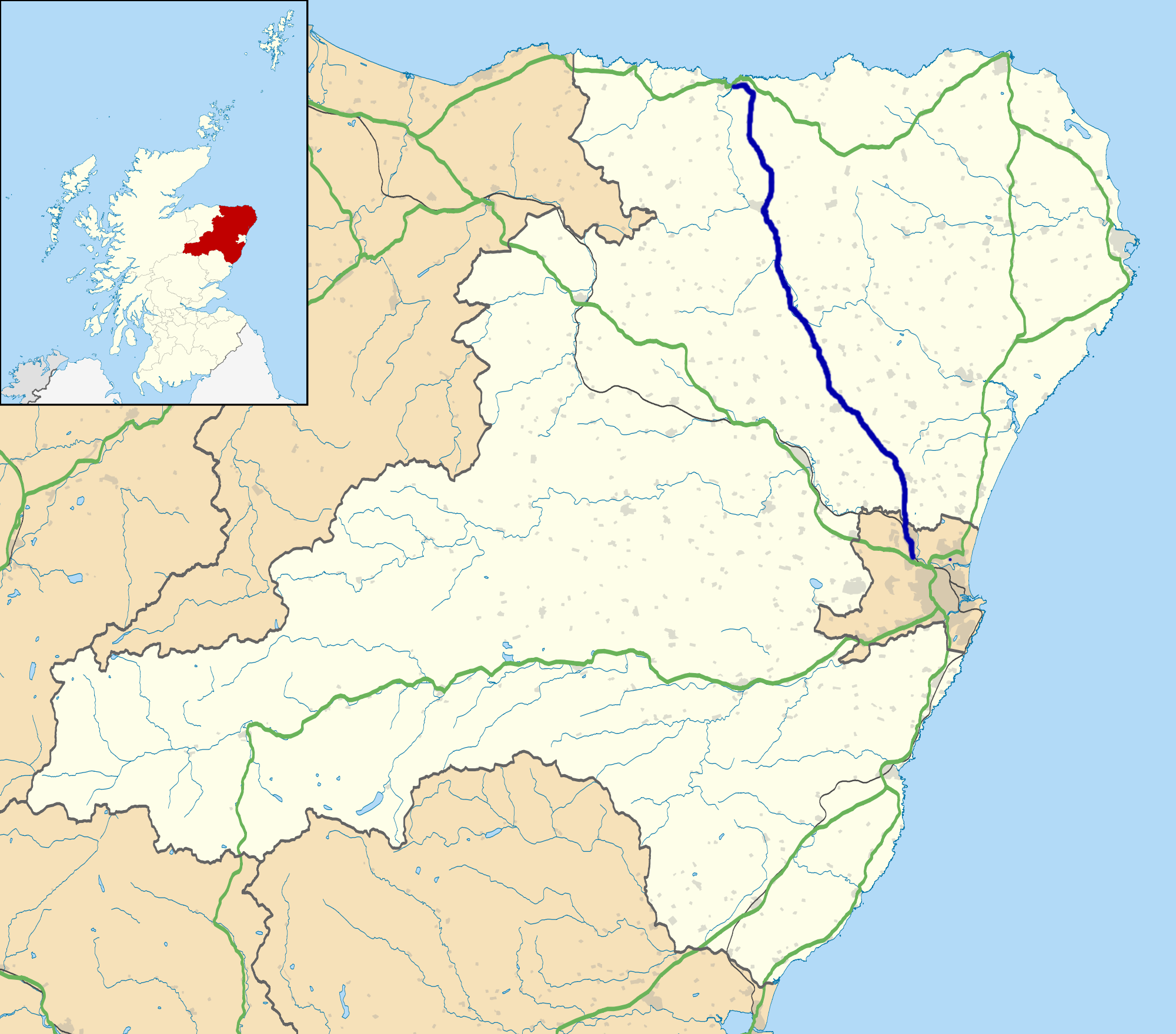

Route information
- Length: 40.7 mi (65.5 km)

Major junctions
- From: Aberdeen
- To: Banff

Location
- Country: United Kingdom
- Constituent country: Scotland

Road network
- Roads in the United Kingdom; Motorways; A and B road zones

The A947 is a single-carriageway road in Scotland that links Aberdeen to Banff via several towns in Aberdeenshire, including Newmachar, Oldmeldrum, Fyvie and Turriff.

Approximately half a mile before Oldmeldrum are views of Bennachie.

The A947 has a poor safety record, with over 20 fatal crashes occurring between 2005 and 2018.
