= Kemnay =

Kemnay may refer to:

- Kemnay, Manitoba, a community in Canada
- Kemnay, Aberdeenshire, a village in Scotland
  - Kemnay Academy
  - Kemnay House
  - Kemnay railway station
