= Alford Valley Railway =

Heritage railway line in Scotland

Coordinates: 57.232°N 2.699°W

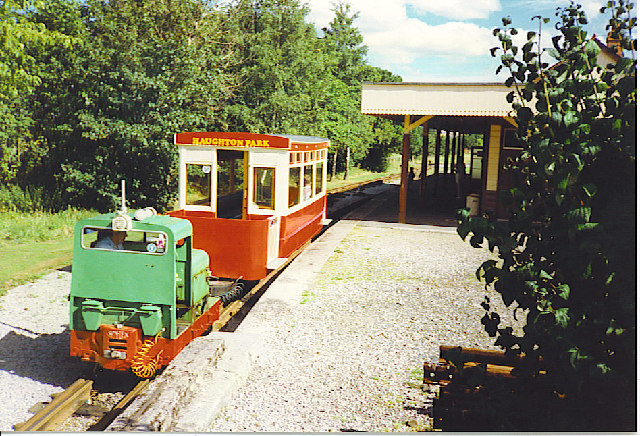
- Alford Railway Station
- Locale: Howe of Alford, Aberdeenshire, Scotland
- Terminus: Alford Railway Station

Commercial operations
- Built by: Duncan MacKenzie Haggis Railway Services
- Original gauge: 4 ft 8 1/2 in (1,435 mm) standard gauge

Preserved operations
- Preserved gauge: 2 ft (610 mm)

Commercial history
- 1859: opened
- Closed to passengers: 1950
- Closed: 1966

Preservation history
- 1980: Haughton Park to Murray Park opened
- 1984: Alford to Haughton Park opened
- 2017: railway closed
- 2023: Community Railway reopened

The Alford Valley Railway is a 2 ft (610 mm) narrow gauge railway in the Howe of Alford, Aberdeenshire, Scotland. It is located at what used to be the terminus of the passenger and goods Alford Valley Railway which connected with the Great North of Scotland Railway main line at Kintore.

== Original railway ==
The construction of the Alford Valley Railway started in 1856 and the line opened in 1859 as a Great North of Scotland Railway (GNSR) branch line from Kintore railway station, northwest of Aberdeen, with stations at Kemnay, Monymusk, Tillyfourie, Whitehouse and Alford. The line also served Kemnay Quarry and three other granite quarries in the area. The summit of the line is just west of Tillyfourie at 618 feet (188 m) where a mile-long cutting 30 feet (9.1 m) deep required cutting through particularly hard granite. The train took just over an hour for the 16-mile (26 km) journey. Until 1883, by law the third class fare on one train a day could not be more than a penny per mile.

In 1923 GNSR was incorporated into the London and North Eastern Railway and, in 1948, became part of the Scottish Region of British Railways. The line closed to passengers on 31 December 1949, when driver Mr James Tocher drove the last passenger train into Alford Station. The goods service closed exactly sixteen years later on 31 December 1965, when the last train was driven by Mr Robert Asher, and attended by Mr James Elder, guard, both Aberdeen, and Mr Walter Mearns, fireman, Inverurie.

== Narrow gauge railway ==
The narrow gauge railway, built from salvaged equipment from the New Pitsligo peat moss railway, was proposed in 1979 and opened in 1980. Originally it ran for 3 kilometres (1.9 mi) from Haughton Park station through Murray Park Woods. Then in 1984 another line was run from Alford station, alongside Alford Golf Course, to Haughton Park about 1.35 kilometres (0.84 mi) away where there is a platform. However, the original Murray Woods line was then closed.

The current station building is on the site of the original granite structure which was demolished after British Rail closed the line. The passenger platform is the original. A small railway museum is housed in the railway station building. The original locomotive shed was situated to the east of the station but this has also now been demolished. To the west of the station the granite carriage shed of the previous railway is now used by the Alford Valley Railway. The Grampian Transport Museum and Alford Heritage Museum are nearby.

The railway closed in 2017. A new group, the Alford Valley Community Railway, was subsequently formed with the intention of reopening the line. After six years of closure, the Alford Valley Community Railway was re-opened in August 2023 to passengers.
