= Whitehouse, Aberdeenshire =

Whitehouse is a hamlet in Aberdeenshire, Scotland. It is located on the A944 road 2 miles (3.2 kilometres) southeast of Alford.

The hamlet was formerly served by a railway station on the Alford Valley Railway.

Today, some 220 buses call here and continue to either Alford or Aberdeen via Kemnay, and some 421 buses call here and continue to either Alford or Inverurie via Kemnay.
