= List of listed buildings in Kemnay, Aberdeenshire =

This is a list of listed buildings in the parish of Kemnay in Aberdeenshire, Scotland.

== List ==
Name	Location	Date listed	Geo-coordinates	Notes	Category	LB number	Image
Kemnay Parish Church			57°14′05″N 2°26′13″W		C(S)	9207	Upload Photo
Kemnay School, Original School And Schoolhouse			57°13′58″N 2°26′35″W		B	9209	Upload Photo
Kemnay House Policies, Kemnay Home Farm, Linhay And The Stables			57°13′43″N 2°26′43″W		C(S)	9216	Upload Photo
Kemnay House, West Lodge Including Boundary Walls And Gates			57°13′37″N 2°27′18″W		C(S)	50511	Upload Photo
Kemnay House Policies, Home Farm, Apple House			57°13′44″N 2°26′41″W		C(S)	9214	Upload Photo
Kemnay Parish Church, Morthouse			57°14′05″N 2°26′15″W		B	9208	Upload Photo
Birchfield Kemnay			57°14′00″N 2°26′38″W		C(S)	9210	Upload Photo
Kemnay House			57°13′42″N 2°26′34″W		A	9212	Upload another image See more images
Kemnay House Policies, Old Laundry			57°13′44″N 2°26′35″W		B	9213	Upload Photo
Kemnay House Policies, The Ram			57°13′43″N 2°26′32″W		C(S)	49822	Upload Photo
James Mitchell Memorial, Kemnay			57°13′56″N 2°26′53″W		C(S)	9211	Upload Photo
Milton Farmhouse, Including Ancillary Structure			57°13′41″N 2°27′16″W		C(S)	45912	Upload Photo
Kemnay House Policies, Bellcote Of Old Parish Church Within Later (N) Walled Garden			57°13′48″N 2°26′37″W		B	9215	Upload Photo

== Key ==
The scheme for classifying buildings in Scotland is:

- Category A: "buildings of national or international importance, either architectural or historic; or fine, little-altered examples of some particular period, style or building type."
- Category B: "buildings of regional or more than local importance; or major examples of some particular period, style or building type, which may have been altered."
- Category C: "buildings of local importance; lesser examples of any period, style, or building type, as originally constructed or moderately altered; and simple traditional buildings which group well with other listed buildings."

In March 2016 there were 47,288 listed buildings in Scotland. Of these, 8% were Category A, and 50% were Category B, with the remaining 42% being Category C.

== See also ==
- List of listed buildings in Aberdeenshire
