= Tillyfourie railway station =

Former railway station in Scotland

Tillyfourie
- The station shown on a 1900 OS map

General information
- Location: Aberdeenshire; Scotland
- Coordinates: 57.2004°N 2.5879°W
- Platforms: 2

Other information
- Status: Disused

History
- Original company: Alford Valley Railway
- Pre-grouping: Great North of Scotland Railway
- Post-grouping: LNER

Key dates
- 2 June 1860: Opened
- 2 January 1950: Closed
- 3 January 1966: Line closed
Location

Tillyfourie railway station was a railway station serving Tillyfourie, Aberdeenshire, Scotland.

The station opened on 2 June 1860 on the Alford Valley Railway a year after the 16.5 miles (26.6 km) line between Kintore and Alford.

Originally the station had one platform on the south side of the single track railway, and one siding to the west of the station. By 1900 the line through the station had become a passing loop and there were two platforms connected with a footbridge, a signal box was located to the east. There were three sidings that were able to accommodate most types of goods including live stock.

The station closed on 2 January 1950, the sidings were removed by 1960 when even the daily freight train did not call. The line closed completely on 3 January 1966 when all services were withdrawn between Paradise Siding and Alford.

Preceding station	Historical railways	Following station
Whitehouse; Line and station closed	Great North of Scotland Railway; Alford Valley Railway	Monymusk; Line and station closed
