= Whitehouse railway station (Scotland) =

Former railway station in Scotland

Coordinates: 57.2253°N 2.6344°W

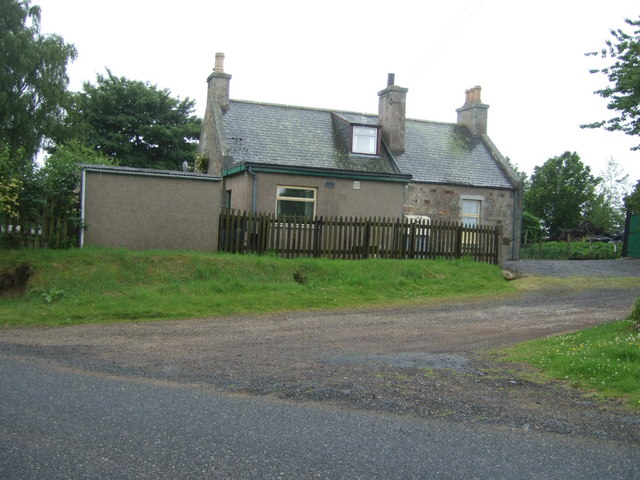
The station house in 2008

Whitehouse railway station was a station in Whitehouse, Aberdeenshire. It opened with the along with the rest of the Alford Valley Railway line from Kintore to Alford in 1859 and closed in 1950.

Historical railways
Alford; Line part open; station open	Great North of Scotland Railway; Alford Valley Railway	Tillyfourie; Line and station closed
Preceding station	Heritage railways	Following station
Proposed extension
Haughton Park towards Alford	Alford Valley Railway	Terminus
