= List of listed buildings in Alford, Aberdeenshire =

This is a list of listed buildings in the parish of Alford in Aberdeenshire, Scotland.

== List ==
Name	Location	Date listed	Grid ref. (Note: Sometimes known as OSGB36, the grid reference (where provided) is based on the British national grid reference system used by the Ordnance Survey. • "Guide to National Grid". Ordnance Survey. • "Get-a-map". Ordnance Survey.)	Geo-coordinates	Notes	LB number (Note: Historic Environment Scotland assign a unique alphanumeric identifier to each designated site in Scotland, for listed buildings this always begins with "LB", for example "LB12345".)	Image
Haughton House, Icehouse				57°14′30″N 2°41′38″W	Category B	3276	Upload Photo
Breda East Lodge Gatepiers				57°14′00″N 2°44′45″W	Category B	3280	Upload Photo
Mill Of Bandley				57°14′23″N 2°38′42″W	Category B	3285	Upload Photo
Mill Of Bandley House				57°14′23″N 2°38′41″W	Category C(S)	3286	Upload Photo
East Gallowhill, Steading				57°13′50″N 2°43′32″W	Category C(S)	3294	Upload Photo
Balfluig Castle Cottage				57°13′34″N 2°40′37″W	Category C(S)	3279	Upload Photo
Fairlea Farmhouse				57°14′12″N 2°45′57″W	Category C(S)	3283	Upload Photo
East Gallowhill, Farmhouse				57°13′50″N 2°43′31″W	Category B	3293	Upload Photo
Haughton House, Cottages Approx. 125 Yds. N. Of Haughton House				57°14′32″N 2°41′36″W	Category B	3277	Upload Photo
West (Old) Parish Church				57°14′01″N 2°44′26″W	Category B	3287	Upload Photo
Correen (Including Walls And Gates) Bank Brae, Alford Village				57°13′56″N 2°42′17″W	Category B	3274	Upload Photo
Breda				57°14′19″N 2°44′57″W	Category B	3281	Upload Photo
West (Old) Parish Churchyard				57°14′01″N 2°44′26″W	Category C(S)	3288	Upload Photo
Bridge Over Leochel At Above				57°13′58″N 2°44′33″W	Category C(S)	3290	Upload Photo
Breda Mausoleum				57°14′22″N 2°45′20″W	Category B	3282	Upload Photo
Annfield, Farmhouse				57°14′06″N 2°44′32″W	Category C(S)	3291	Upload Photo
Annfield Mill				57°14′07″N 2°44′30″W	Category C(S)	3292	Upload Photo
Alford, Main Street, St Andrew's Episcopal Church, Including Gates, Gatepiers, Boundary Walls And Railings				57°13′59″N 2°42′12″W	Category C(S)	47909	Upload Photo
Kingsford House				57°13′15″N 2°43′28″W	Category C(S)	3284	Upload Photo
Former Manse (Now Known As Mansefield)				57°14′00″N 2°44′29″W	Category B	3289	Upload Photo
Haughton House				57°14′27″N 2°41′33″W	Category B	3275	Upload Photo
Balfluig Castle				57°13′27″N 2°41′12″W	Category A	3278	Upload Photo
Castleton Of Asloun, Farmhouse				57°13′19″N 2°45′39″W	Category C(S)	48	Upload Photo

== Key ==
The scheme for classifying buildings in Scotland is:

- Category A: "buildings of national or international importance, either architectural or historic; or fine, little-altered examples of some particular period, style or building type."
- Category B: "buildings of regional or more than local importance; or major examples of some particular period, style or building type, which may have been altered."
- Category C: "buildings of local importance; lesser examples of any period, style, or building type, as originally constructed or moderately altered; and simple traditional buildings which group well with other listed buildings."

In March 2016 there were 47,288 listed buildings in Scotland. Of these, 8% were Category A, and 50% were Category B, with the remaining 42% being Category C.

== See also ==
- List of listed buildings in Aberdeenshire
