= Blackburn, Aberdeenshire =

Village in Aberdeenshire, Scotland

Coordinates: 57.205283°N 2.288903°W

Blackburn
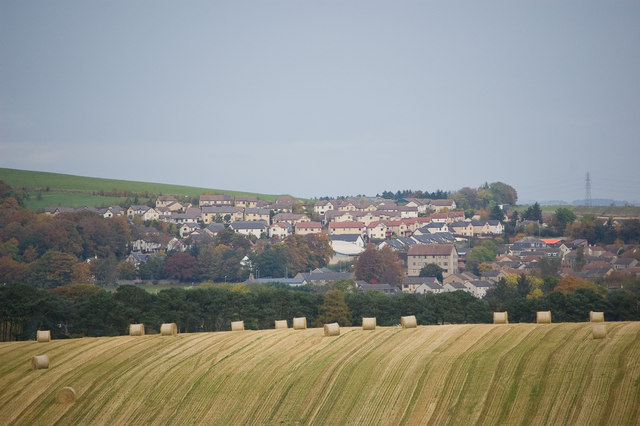
- View of Blackburn from the south of the village.

- Location within Aberdeenshire
- Population: 3,050 (2020)
- OS grid reference: NJ826127
- Council area: Aberdeenshire
- Lieutenancy area: Aberdeenshire
- Country: Scotland
- Sovereign state: United Kingdom
- Post town: Aberdeen
- Postcode district: AB21
- Dialling code: 01224 79
- Police: Scotland
- Fire: Scottish
- Ambulance: Scottish
- UK Parliament: West Aberdeenshire and Kincardine
- Scottish Parliament: Aberdeenshire West

Blackburn is a village northwest of Aberdeen, Scotland, and is situated in Aberdeenshire. Local amenities include an industrial estate, primary school, nursing home, local Co-op and a community hall (Kinellar Community Centre).

== Governance ==
Blackburn is part of the West Aberdeenshire and Kincardine county constituency for UK Parliament elections.

For Scottish elections Blackburn is part of the Aberdeenshire West constituency and part of the North East Scotland electoral region.

Blackburn is within the East Garioch ward which forms part of the Garioch administrative area of Aberdeenshire Council.

Fintray and Kinellar Community Council has previously represented the views of residents to Aberdeenshire Council and other public bodies. However, it currently is without a formal community council.

== Geography ==
Located 8.5 miles (14km) WNW of Aberdeen and 92 miles (150km) NNE of Edinburgh, Blackburn is a village just north of Backhill Wood where small streams form and join into Black burn from which the village takes its name. The burn runs north to join the River Don.

== Economy ==
Blackburn Industrial Estate is located at the south end of the village adjacent to the A96.

== Culture and community ==
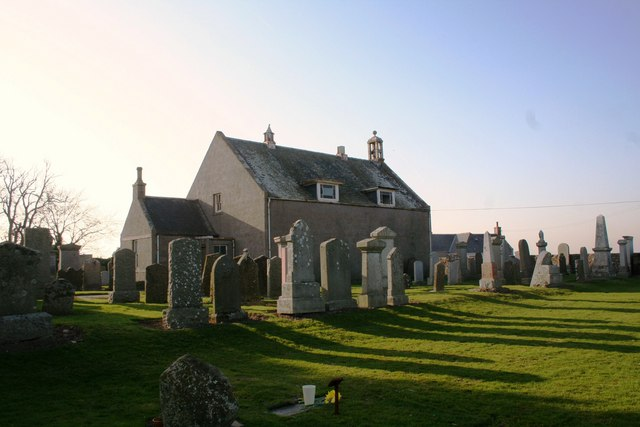
Kinellar Church - geograph.org.uk - 1222089

Kinellar Community Centre was opened by The Princess Royal on 2 March 2005. It is used for community groups, sports, birthday parties and social events.

Kinellar Parish Church, located just north of the village, is no longer in use.

== Sport ==
Blackburn AFC, formed in 1947, is an Aberdeenshire AFA Division Two (East) team.

== Education ==
Blackburn has one school, Kinellar Primary School, which provides primary education for local pupils. Pupils travel by bus to neighbouring Kemnay and attend Kemnay Academy for secondary education.

On New Year's Day 2016, there was a fire at Kinellar School, reported to police at around 2.15am. Significant damage was caused to nursery and P1 classes. A 16 year old was arrested and charged in relation to the fire. The old school was demolished, and a new £12 million school was built on its site. It includes a nursery, games area, community park and additional car parking.
