= Daniel Dow =

Scottish musician and composer

Daniel Dow (1732 – 1783) was a traditional Scottish fiddler, composer, teacher and concert organizer and one of the first musicians to publish music specifically for bagpipes. He is credited as both Daniel and Donald, both acceptable translations for the Gaelic name of 'Domhnull'.

== Life ==
Dow was born 1732 in Kirkmichael, Perthshire, Scotland and became a music teacher in Edinburgh where he taught, among other instruments, the guitar. In December 1774 at Kirmichael, Perthshire he married Susanna Small of Dirnanean. The couple had four children. Dow died of a fever on 20 January 1783 and is buried in Canongate Church, Edinburgh, Scotland.

A concert to benefit his widow and children was given shortly after his death in St. Mary's Hall, Niddry's Wynd, where Dow had often given his own concerts over the years. His son John also became a fiddler.

== Works ==
About 1775 he issued a collection of "Twenty Minuets and Sixteen Reels".

In 1776 in Edinburgh, Dow published "Daniel Dow, A Collection of Ancient Scots Music", a collection of 16 songs for the violin, harpsichord or German Flute. This collection included never before printed historical compositions consisting of ports, salutations, marches or piobrachs, making it one of the first publications to include music specifically for the bagpipes. It is one of the important sources of traditional Scottish music.

Also in 1776, Dow published Thirty Seven New Reels & Strathspeys for the Violin, Harpsichord, Piano Forte or German Flute. This is the first collection of music to include the word "Strathspey" in its title.

"Money Musk" being danced at Youth Dance Weekend 2019 in Weston, Vermont, with music by Calluna. The clip begins after the caller has dropped out.

Dow's most famous composition is Monymusk, a contra dance originally published in 1776 under the title of Sir Archibald Grant of Monymusk's Reel. The tune was likely named after Sir Grant's estate near Monymusk, Aberdeenshire, Scotland. The composition is considered one of the great Scottish strathspeys. The piece has become ubiquitous in Scotland, Ireland, and North America.

Many of Dow's compositions were renamed by Nathaniel Gow and others when including them in their own collections.
