= Monymusk Priory =

Priory in Aberdeenshire, Scotland

Monymusk Priory was a house of Augustinian canons based at Monymusk in Mar, Aberdeenshire. It began as a Culdee foundation but later became Augustinian.

== History ==
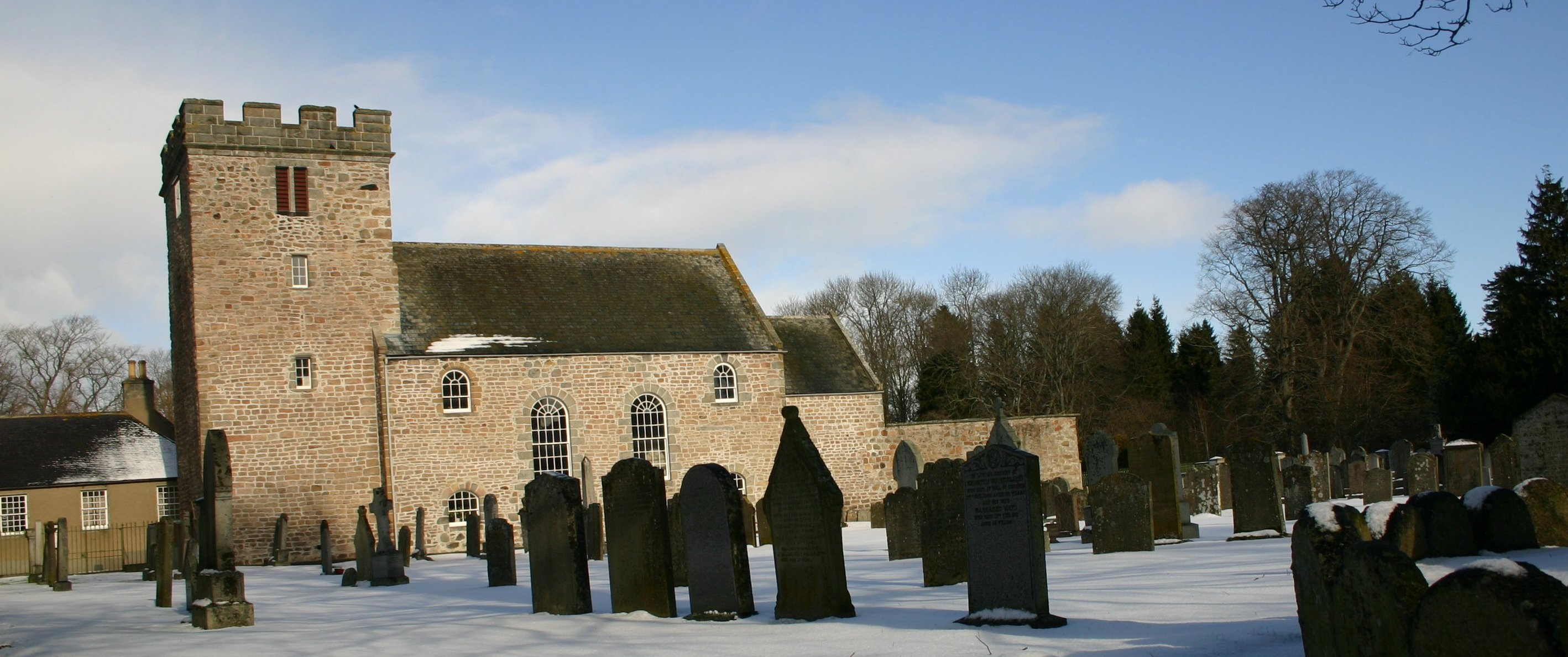
Church of the Blessed Mary, Monymusk

The first missionaries to arrive in Monymusk were Culdees, possibly from Whithorn. A 9th century Pictish stone was found in a nearby field and is displayed at the Church of the Blessed Mary in Monymusk. The Culdees received a land grant at Monymusk in 1130, probably to an already established religious community. They had the right to a dormitory, a refectory and an oratory with burial right in the parish cemetery,

A Romanesque church was completed early in the second half of the 12th Century. Gille Críst, Mormaer of Mar constructed a monastery there in the last decade of the 12th century. The church likely served as both a parish church for local inhabitants and the conventual church for the canons who utilized the unusually long chancel.

By 1245, the transformation of the community into an Augustinian priory was complete with a Prior and eleven canons. There was a school, three gardens, a croft, pastures, a number of monastic buildings, and a fish-pond. There were two oratories, each about two miles from the priory.

Some degree of control of the priory was held by St Andrews Cathedral Priory. The bishops of St Andrews and Aberdeen disputed jurisdiction. For some time the priory held custody of Monymusk Reliquary.

By the early 16th century the Priory had entered into a period of decline. The last religious Prior, David Farlie, was charged with murder and other crimes and was succeeded by lay commendator John Elphinstone in 1542, The priory was gutted by fire in 1554, and the canons could not afford to rebuild. About 1587, the Forbses used stone from the old Priory to build the present House of Monymusk. In 1617 the priory was incorporated into the lands of the bishopric of Dunblane. The church continued to serve the local community.

== Bibliography ==
- Cowan, Ian B. & Easson, David E., Medieval Religious Houses: Scotland With an Appendix on the Houses in the Isle of Man, Second Edition, (London, 1976), pp. 93–4
- Watt, D.E.R. & Shead, N.F. (eds.), The Heads of Religious Houses in Scotland from the 12th to the 16th Centuries, The Scottish Records Society, New Series, Volume 24, (Edinburgh, 2001), pp. 155–9

== See also ==
- Prior of Monymusk, for a list of priors and commendators
