= National Heritage Memorial Fund =

Fund to preserve British heritage

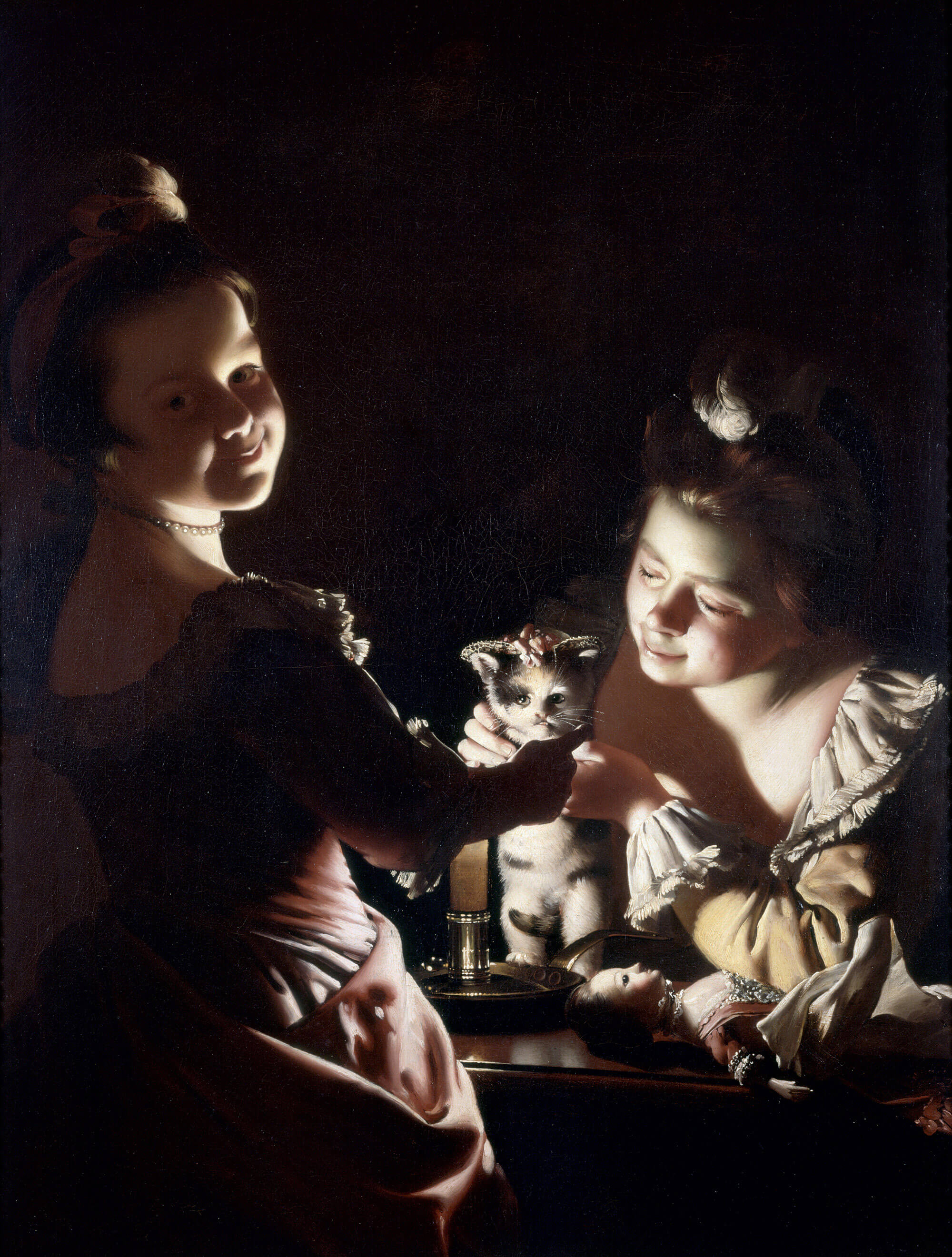
Joseph Wright of Derby. Two Girls Dressing a Kitten by Candlelight. c. 1768–1770. Oil on canvas, Kenwood House, London. Acquired by English Heritage with help from the National Heritage Memorial Fund.

The National Heritage Memorial Fund (NHMF) was set up in 1980 to save the most outstanding parts of the British national heritage, in memory of those who have given their lives for the UK. It replaced the National Land Fund, which had fulfilled the same function since 1946. It received £20 million Government grant in aid between 2011–2015, allowing for an annual budget of between £4 million and £5 million. Between 1980 and 2020, the NHMF spent £368 million. Nearly a third (over £106 million) was spent on buildings and monuments, and nearly £194 million was spent on paintings, furniture and other objects. A diverse list of over 1,200 heritage items have been safeguarded by the National Heritage Memorial Fund, including:

- The St Cuthbert Gospel (£4.5M to the British Library, 2012)
- The Hereford Mappa Mundi
- The Mary Rose
- Flying Scotsman
- The last surviving World War II destroyer, HMS Cavalier
- Orford Ness nature reserve in Suffolk
- Beamish Exhibition Colliery
- Sir Walter Scott manuscripts
- Antonio Canova's The Three Graces
- Pablo Picasso's The Weeping Woman
- The Nativity, a miniature by Jean Bourdichon
- Thrust2 world land speed record car
- The Amarna Princess, an ancient Egyptian statuette, later proved to be a forgery by Shaun Greenhalgh
- Canterbury Astrolabe Quadrant.
- The personal archive of Siegfried Sassoon, World War I soldier, author and poet
- Skokholm Island, site of Special Scientific Interest (SSSI) in Pembrokeshire
- The Craigievar Express

National Trust country house acquisitions funded through the NHMF include Calke Abbey, Belton House, Kedleston Hall and Chastleton House. In addition, NHMF intervention helped Burton Constable Hall, Paxton House, Thirlestane Castle, Hopetoun House, Weston Park and Wentworth Woodhouse to be established as independent charitable trusts. NHMF funds were also used to rescue parts of the collections at Powderham Castle, Althorp, Castle Howard, Highclere Castle, Belvoir Castle and Mount Stuart House.

The NHMF is funded by grant-in-aid from the UK Government through the Department for Culture, Media and Sport.

In 1993 NHMF was given the responsibility for distributing the share of heritage funding from the National Lottery for the heritage good cause. It does this through the National Lottery Heritage Fund.
