= Craigievar Express =

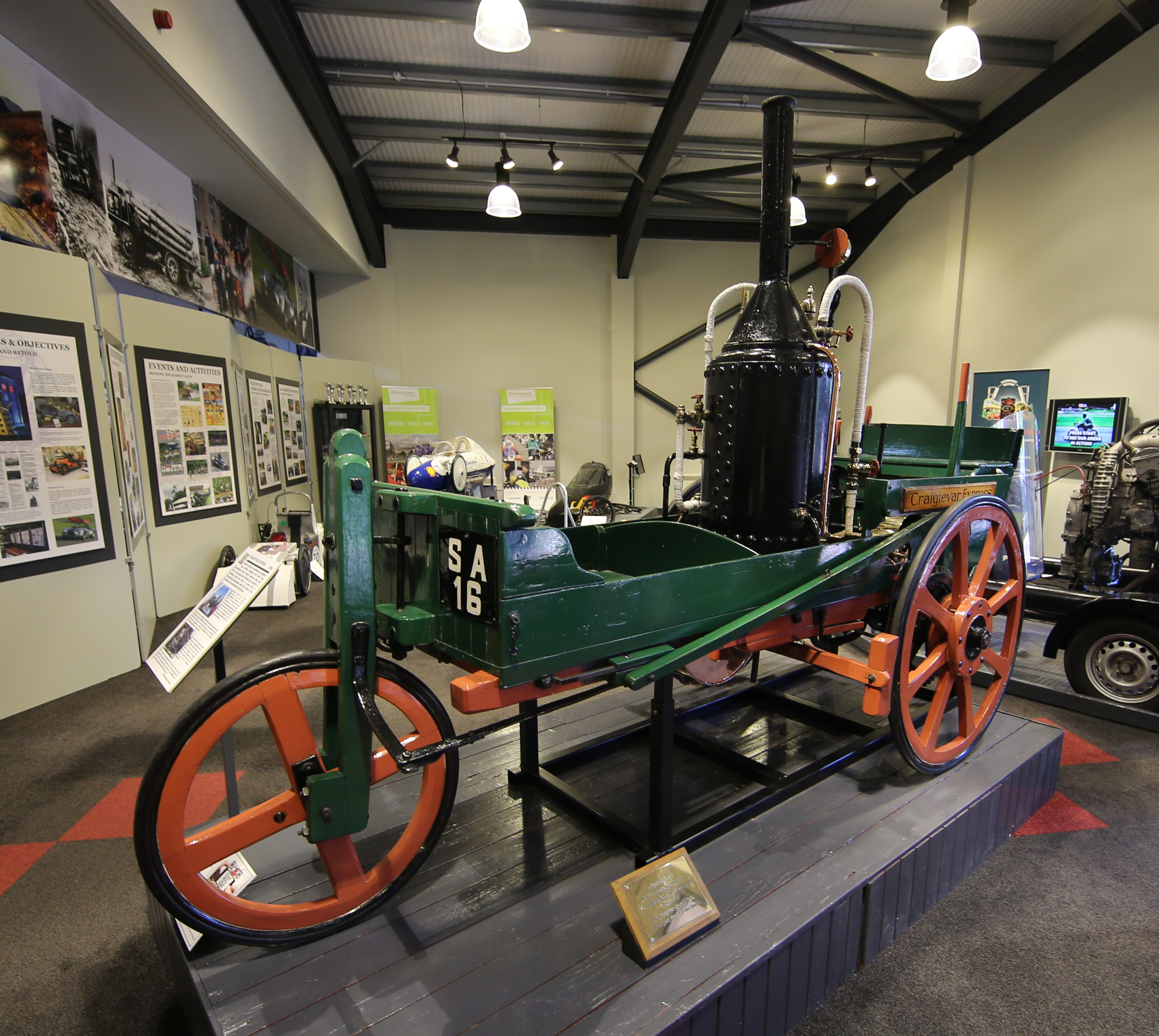
The Craigievar Express

The Craigievar Express is a steam-powered tricycle built by Andrew 'Postie' Lawson between 1895 and 1897 in Craigievar, Scotland. The vehicle's frame is made from wood, as are its wheels. The engine is a single-cylinder model and was purchased second hand from a sawmill. The Express's boiler was obtained through Exchange and Mart. The flywheel brake acted on the engine, and following the principles of the horse-carriage braking system (brake shoes attached to a lever) another was applied to the rims of the back wheels.

The Express steamed for the first time on 26 June 1897. After that Lawson would drive it at local festivals. He had ceased using the Express by 1934 and died in 1938.

The Craigievar Express was then sold to a man from Aberdeen before later being repurchased by Andrew Lawson's son James. James carried out some restoration on the Express before transferring it to William Forbes-Sempill, 19th Lord Sempill. The Express was then steamed at various events. With Lord Sempill's death in 1965, his widow sold the vehicle to Maurice Smith, a Surrey-based car historian. Smith carried out further restoration work and obtained a MOT certificate for the vehicle. In 1971 Maurice Smith completed the London to Brighton Veteran Car Run with the Craigievar Express.

In 1985 the Craigievar Express was purchased from Maurice Smith by the Grampian Transport Museum. The money for the purchase came partly from donations from the general public but also grants from the Scottish Postal Board, the National Heritage Memorial Fund, the Royal Scottish museum and the National Fund for Acquisitions.

The Craigievar Express is housed at the Grampian Transport Museum, where it is occasionally steamed.
