= Prior of Monymusk =

Head of Augustinian community in Scotland

Prior of Monymusk (later, Commendator of Monymusk) was the head of the property and community of Augustinian canons of Monymusk Priory, Aberdeenshire. The following is a list of priors and commendators:

== List of office holders ==
=== List of priors ===
- Máel Brigte (Bricius), 1210x1211-1222x
- Unknown abbots
- Alan, fl. 1268
- Unknown abbots
- Bernard, fl. 1345
- Andrew Cant, 1357-1365
- Unknown abbots
- David de Kynnard, x 1420
- Richard de Donery, 1420-1426
- Robert de Kilconkar, 1424-1429
- Robert de Paisley, 1427-1429 x 1430
- John de Tulach, 1429
- William de Cupar, 1430-1444 x 1450
- William Crannach, 1430
- William Couys (Cowes), 1430-1434
- Laurence de Cupar, 1430
- Robert de Keith, 1434
- John de Luoris (Luchris), 1444
- David Hay, 1450-1464 x 1469
- Thomas Straton, 1469
- Alexander Spens, 1469-1489 x 1491
- John Dugut, x1489
- William Kermichael (Carmichael), 1489
- Robert Fairweather, 1486-1490
- Laurence Valles, 1490
- Bartholomew de Putellis, 1491
- Richard Strathauchin, 1497-1499 x 1509
- John Aitkenheid, 1509-1523

=== List of commendators ===
- David Ferlie, 1522-1554 x 1558
- John Elphinstone, 1543-1554 x 1562
- Duncan Sviles, 1546
- John Stewart, 1558
- John Hay. 1558-1573
- Alexander Forbes, 1574-1577
- Robert Forbes, 1577-1614 x 1616

== See also ==
- Monymusk Priory
