= Alford railway station =

Disused railway station in Alford, Scotland

Coordinates: 57°13′54.2″N 2°41′56.1″W

Alford
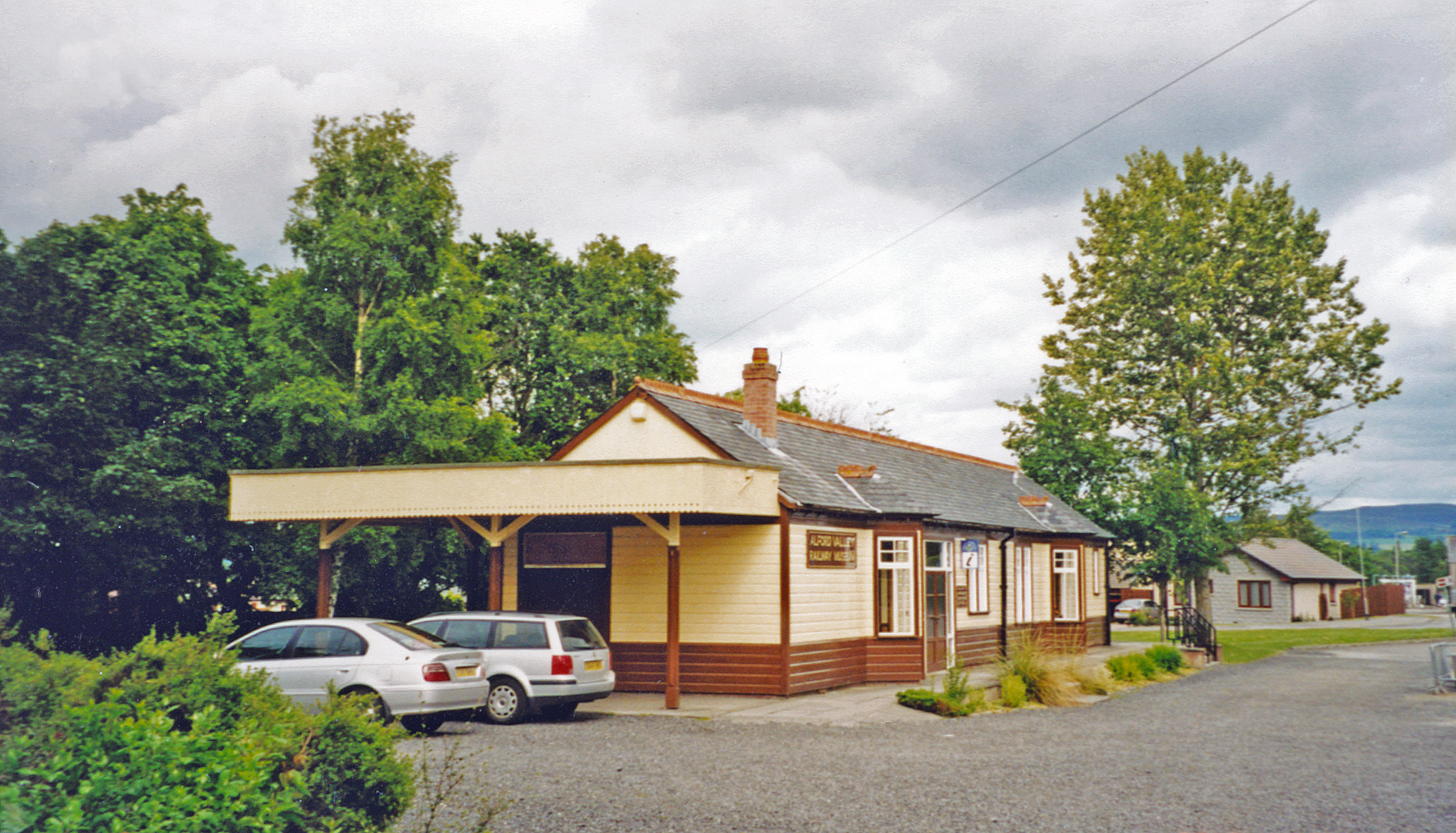

General information
- Location: Alford, Aberdeenshire; Scotland
- Platforms: 1

Other information
- Status: Disused

History
- Original company: Alford Valley Railway
- Pre-grouping: Great North of Scotland Railway
- Post-grouping: London and North Eastern Railway

Key dates
- 25 March 1859: Opened
- 2 January 1950: Closed
- May 1980: Reopened as narrow gauge terminus
Location

Alford railway station is a former railway station in Alford, Aberdeenshire which now serves as a terminus for tourist narrow gauge railway, the Alford Valley Railway. The station used to be the terminus of a line, also called the Alford Valley Railway, from Kintore where it joined the Great North of Scotland Railway main line.

== History ==
Opened by the Great North of Scotland Railway it became part of the London and North Eastern Railway during the Grouping of 1923, passing on to the Scottish Region of British Railways during the nationalisation of 1948. It was then closed by British Railways.

== The site today ==
The station is now the terminus of the Alford Valley Railway. The northern part of the site, which was the former goods yard, was later redeveloped as the home of the Grampian Transport Museum.

== Services ==
Preceding station	Heritage railways	Following station
Terminus	Alford Valley Railway	Haughton Park Terminus
Proposed extension
Terminus	Alford Valley Railway	Haughton Park towards Whitehouse
Disused railways
Terminus	Great North of Scotland Railway; Alford Valley Railway (GNoSR)	Whitehouse; Line and station closed
