= Tillyfourie =

Coordinates: 57°11′N 2°35′W

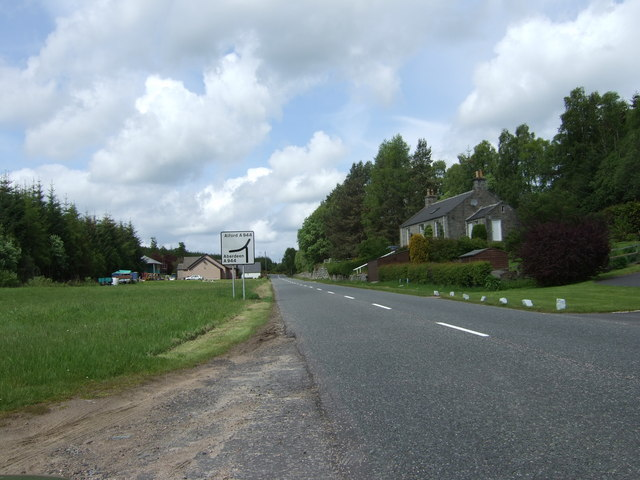

Tillyfourie is a hamlet in Aberdeenshire, Scotland. It is situated at the junction between the A944 road and the B993 road.

A disused quarry and a stone circle are situated in the woodland to the north of Tillyfourie. It was formerly served by Tillyfourie railway station.

Today, the 218 bus and some 220 buses call here and continue to either Alford or Aberdeen via Kemnay, and some 421 buses call here and continue to either Alford or Inverurie via Kemnay.
