= Grampian Transport Museum =

Coordinates: 57.2333182°N 2.701706°W

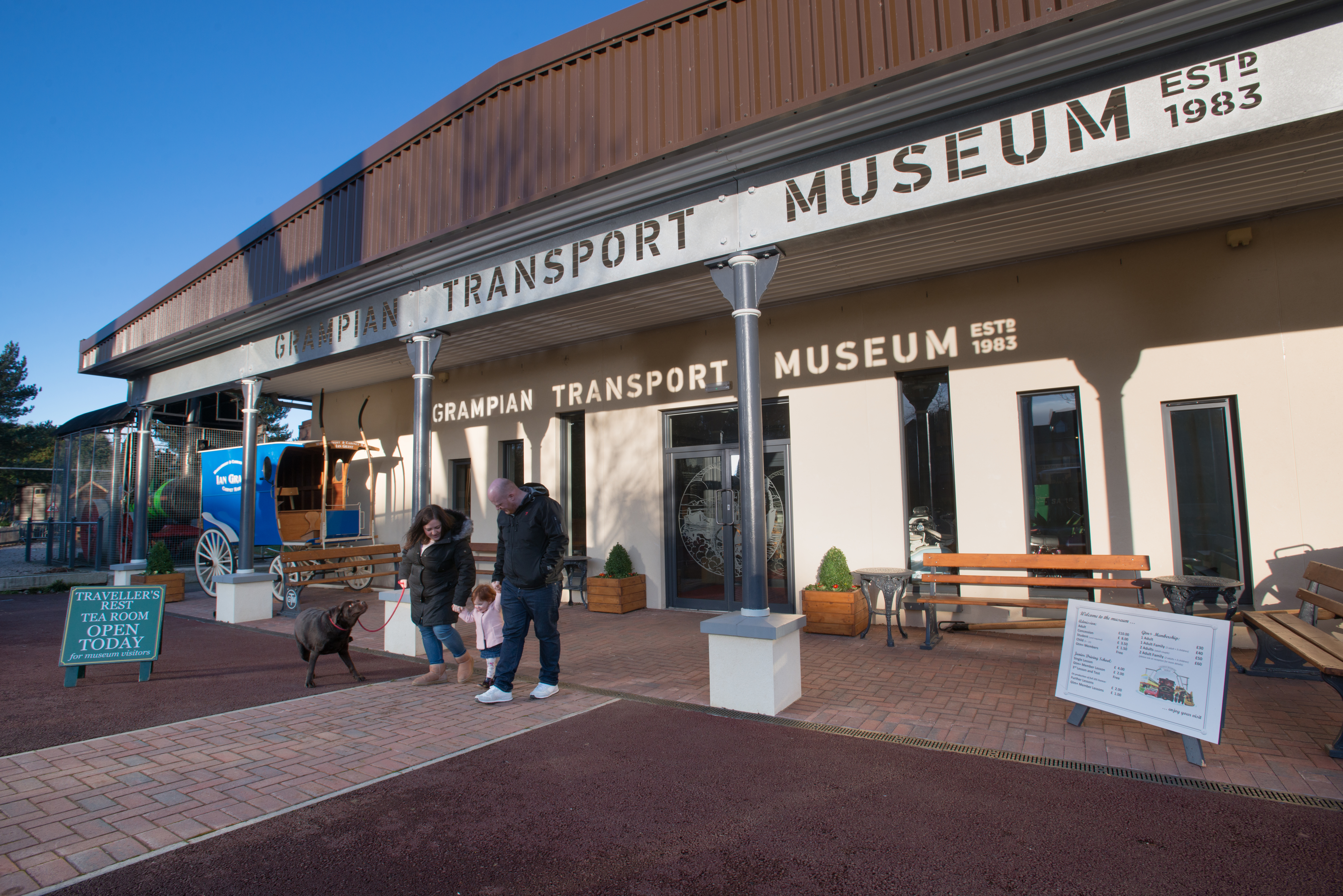
- Established: 1970
- Location: Alford, Aberdeenshire, Scotland
- Type: Transport museum
- Website: https://www.gtm.org.uk/

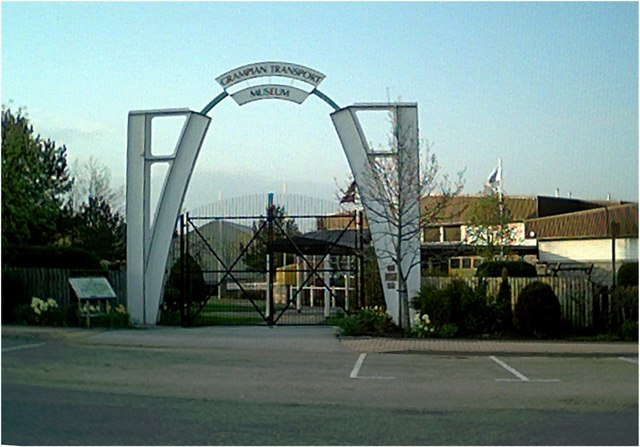
Entrance to the Grampian Transport Museum

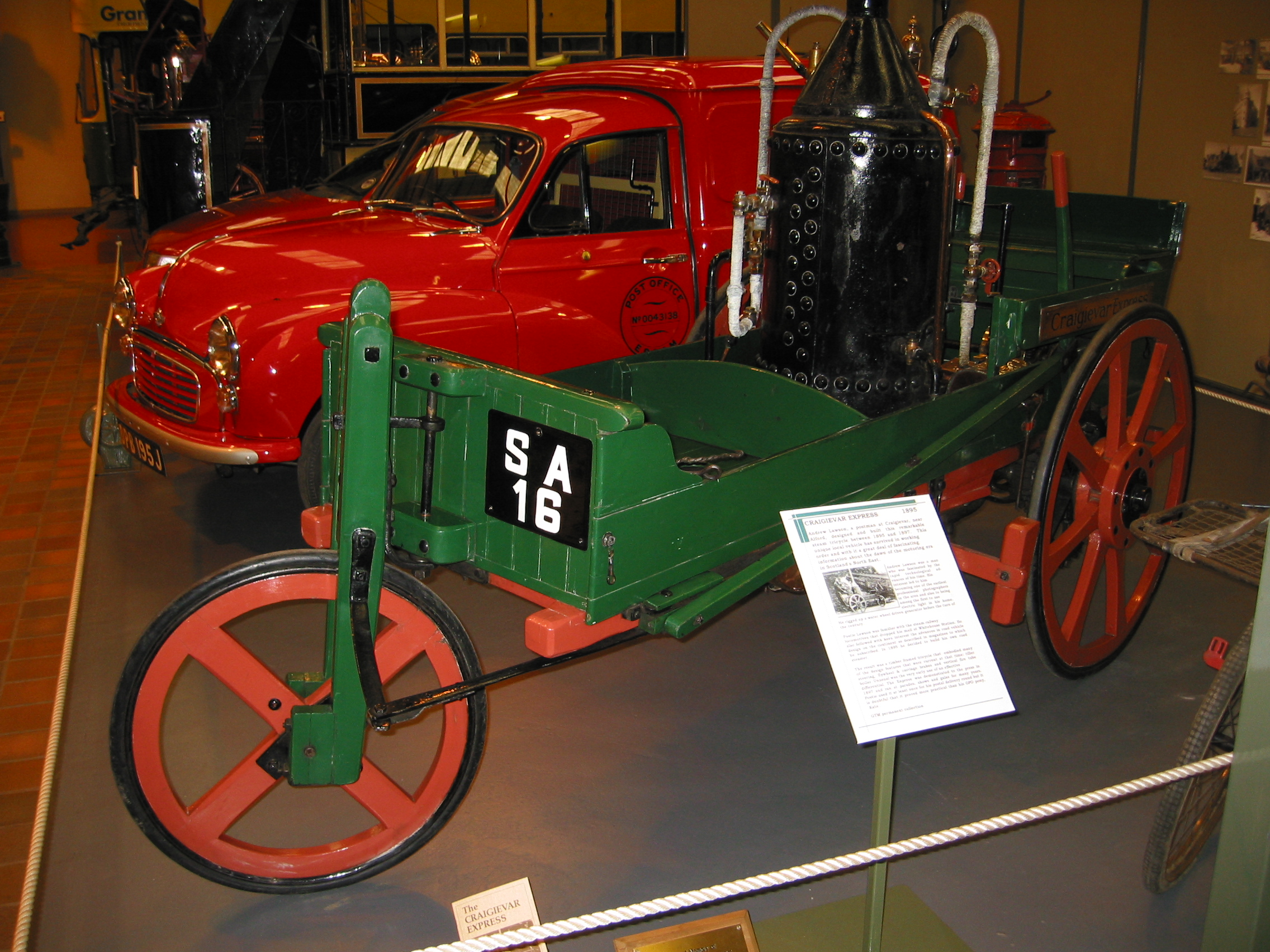
1895 Craigievar Express in the Grampian Transport Museum

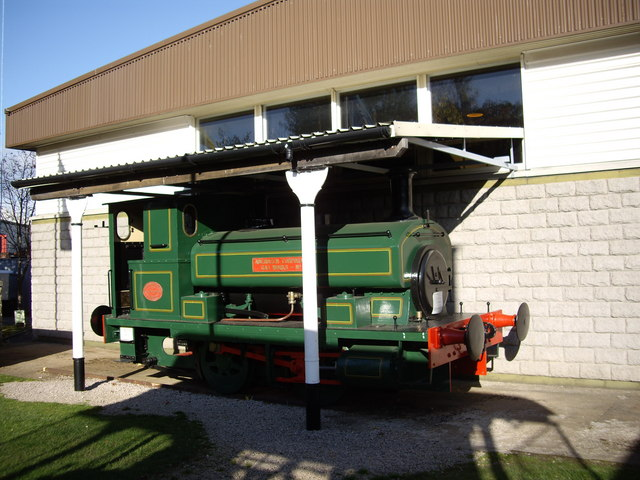
Andrew Barclay Aberdeen Corporation Gasworks No.3 locomotive on display at the museum

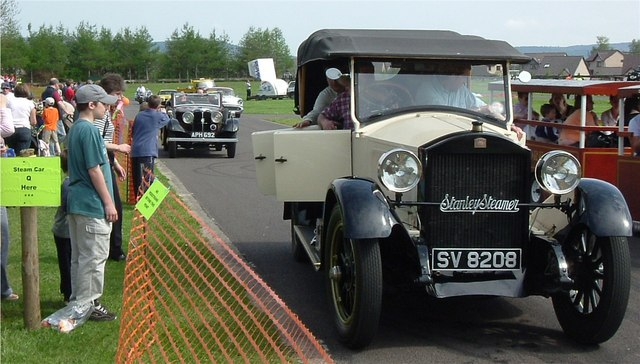
Stanley Steam car running in the Alford Cavalcade at the Grampian Transport Museum

Grampian Transport Museum is a transport museum and charitable trust located in Alford, Aberdeenshire, Scotland. Its exhibits focus on the history of transport in the north east of Scotland and include working and climb-aboard vehicles, static displays, and video presentations.

== History ==
The museum was formed after a group of local transport enthusiasts and collectors in the early 1970s sought to develop a local transport museum.

In 1978, the group held a public meeting at which, after an offer was made to lease the former goods yard to the north of the former Alford railway station, the Grampian Transport Museum Association was formed.

A pilot museum was established in a local factory in 1981, and after the first annual Alford Cavalcade vintage vehicle rally held during July, a combination of local councils offered grants and subsidies to establish a permanent exhibition base. Construction work on the current building was completed in September 1982, and the museum opened in April 1983.

An extension was completed in 1998, landscaping and a track added in the early 2000s, and a second building, the Collections Centre, to house larger exhibits in the 2010s.

In 2016, the museum completed a new reception extension to improve the frontage of the museum and provide a warm welcome to its visitors.

== Exhibition ==
Major exhibits include the world's oldest 1914 Sentinel steam waggon, a giant Mack snowplough, and a working model of Robert Davidson's motor for electric traction. The wider collection includes historic and classic automobiles, motorcycles, a double-decker bus, bicycles, steam vehicles, an electric tram, toy model vehicles, and transport memorabilia.

One of Aberdeen's hydrogen buses was gifted to the museum in 2020.

The exhibition And On That Bombshell, featuring vehicles that appeared on the Top Gear television programme, opened on 28 March 2025 and ran until the end of that year.

== Events ==
In addition to its exhibitions, Grampian Transport Museum hosts events and shows throughout the season. These allow members of the public to display privately owned vehicles and provide educational and interactive experiences, including rides in historic vehicles.

== See also ==
- Alford Valley Railway - located on an adjacent site
