= Monymusk railway station =

Former railway station in Scotland

Monymusk
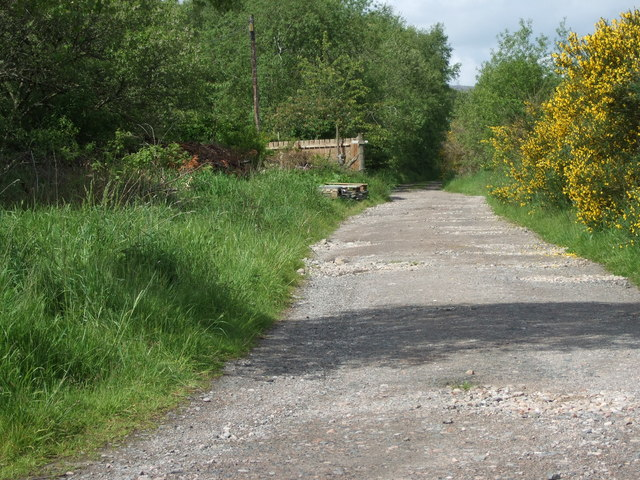
- Dismantled railway neer the site of the station in 2007

General information
- Location: Monymusk, Aberdeenshire; Scotland
- Coordinates: 57.2172°N 2.5223°W

Other information
- Status: Disused

History
- Original company: Alford Valley Railway
- Pre-grouping: Great North of Scotland Railway
- Post-grouping: LNER

Key dates
- 25 March 1859: Opened
- 2 January 1950: Closed
Location

Monymusk railway station was a station on the Alford Valley Railway in Monymusk, Aberdeenshire, Scotland. The station opened on 25 March 1859 and closed on 2 January 1950.

Monymusk was an intermediate station on the Alford branch of the Great North of Scotland Railway. It was a single platform station. In the course of its operations, it was grouped into the London and North-Eastern Railway. Subsequently, it was closed to regular passenger traffic on 2 January, 1950.

Preceding station	Historical railways	Following station
Tillyfourie; Line and station closed	Great North of Scotland Railway; Alford Valley Railway	Kemnay; Line and station closed
