= Monymusk Parish Church =

- Church of the Blessed Mary
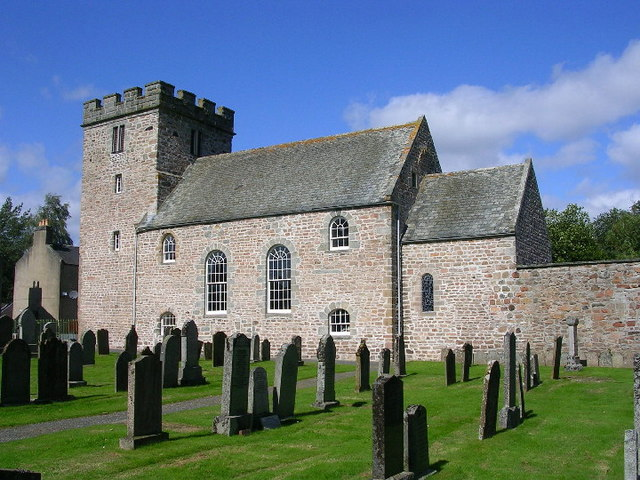
- The church in 2005
- Monymusk Parish Church
- 57°13′37″N 2°31′25″W
- Location: Monymusk, Aberdeenshire
- Country: Scotland
- Denomination: Church of Scotland
- Website: http://monymuskchurch.weebly.com/

Monymusk Parish Church (also known as the Church of the Blessed Mary) is located in Monymusk, Aberdeenshire, Scotland. It is of Church of Scotland denomination. Now Category A listed, a structure on the site has existed since at least the late 12th or early 13th century, but it was a site of worship even before that.

Originally Monymusk Priory, today's structure has been altered several times, including post-Reformation (around 1690), and in 1822, 1851 and 1921, when Alexander Marshall Mackenzie performed a partial restoration.

The clock face dates to 1865, and its Mowat bell 1748.

There are monuments to Forbes-Leslie of Abersnithick and Sir Archibald Grant and his relatives.
