= Monymusk =

Village in Aberdeenshire, Scotland

Coordinates: 57.2269°N 2.52385°W

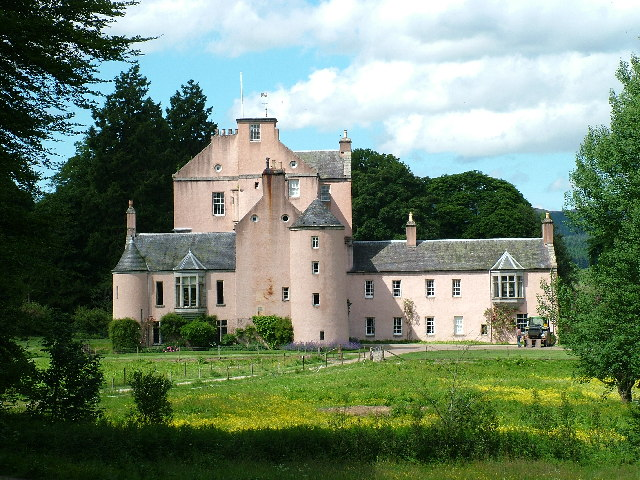
The House of Monymusk

Monymusk (Scottish Gaelic: Monadh Musga) is a planned village in the Marr area of Aberdeenshire, Scotland.

== History ==
Malcolm Canmore first established a Celtic foundation on the site in 1078. The Culdees of Munimusc are recorded as inhabiting the site in 1170. Monymusk Priory, an Augustinian priory, was built by Gilchrist, Earl of Mar, around 1200. The estate passed from the Forbes family to the Grant family in 1712, and Sir Archibald Grant established a planned village for estate workers. Monymusk Parish Church today occupies the location.

The village was largely rebuilt again in 1840.

In modern times, Monymusk serves as a site for fishing on the nearby River Don.

The village was served by Monymusk railway station on the Alford Valley Railway from 1859 to 1950. The station was sited approximately half a mile south of the village.

== People ==
The eminent geologist and palaeontologist Dame Maria Matilda Ogilvie Gordon was born in the village in 1864. The painters Archibald and Alexander Robertson were also natives of the village. Child actor and historian Jon Whiteley was born here in 1945.

== Legacy ==
A 1776 strathspey was named after the estate, and a 1786 contra dance was named after the strathspey. The dance is still widely danced today.

== Gallery ==
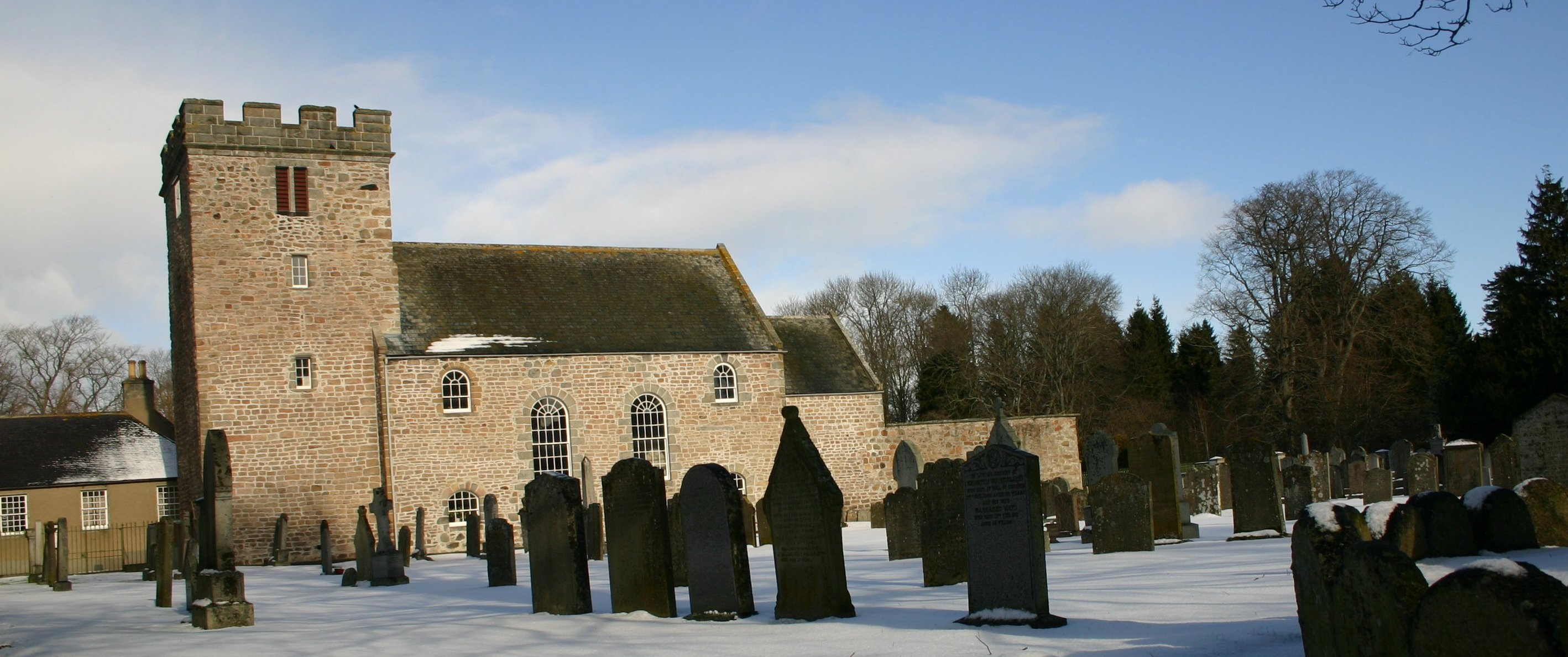
Monymusk Parish Church

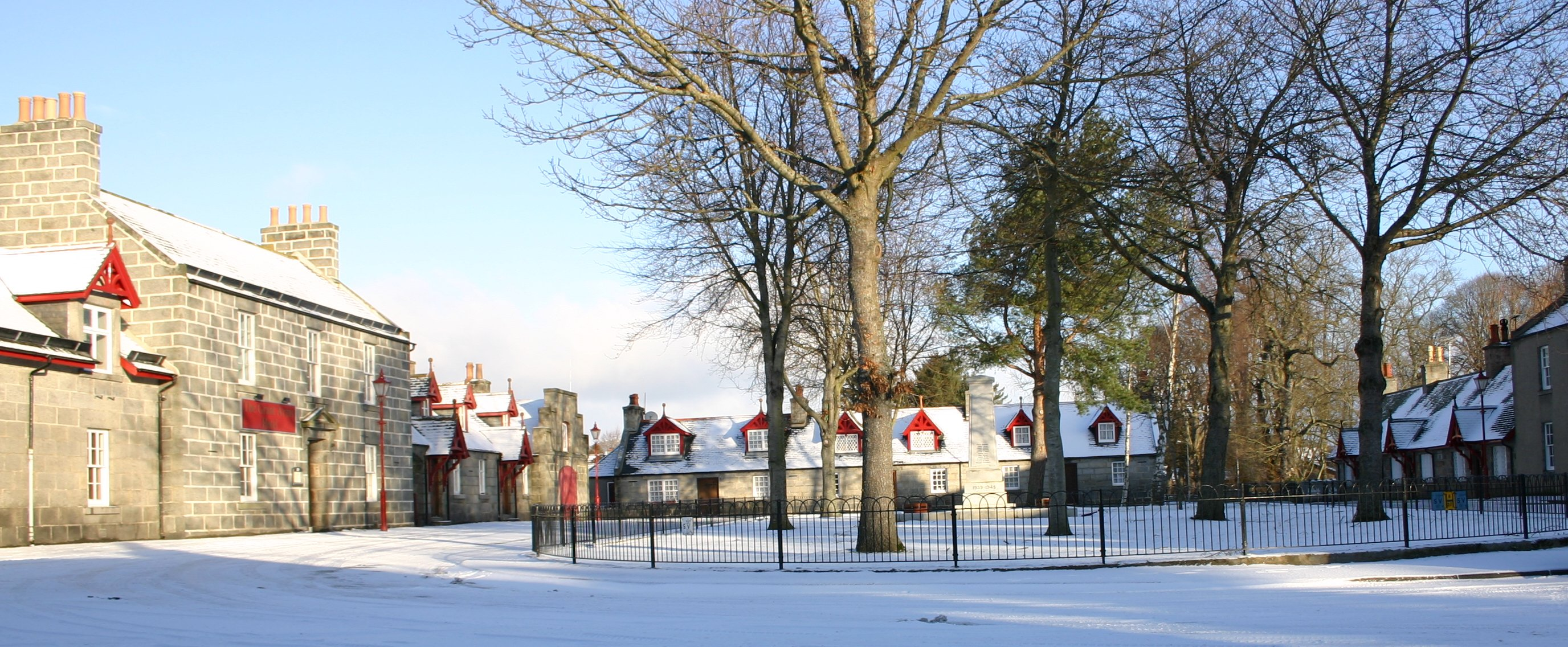
Monymusk Village Square

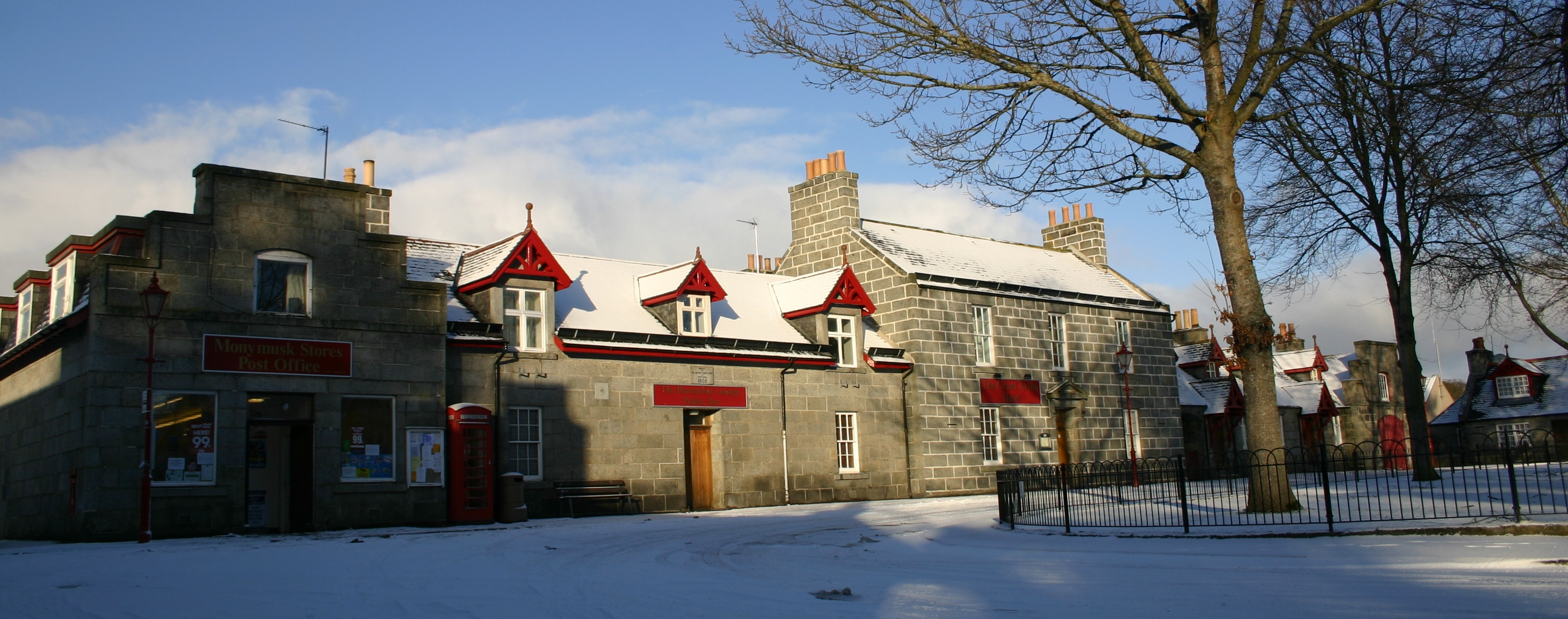
Monymusk Post Office

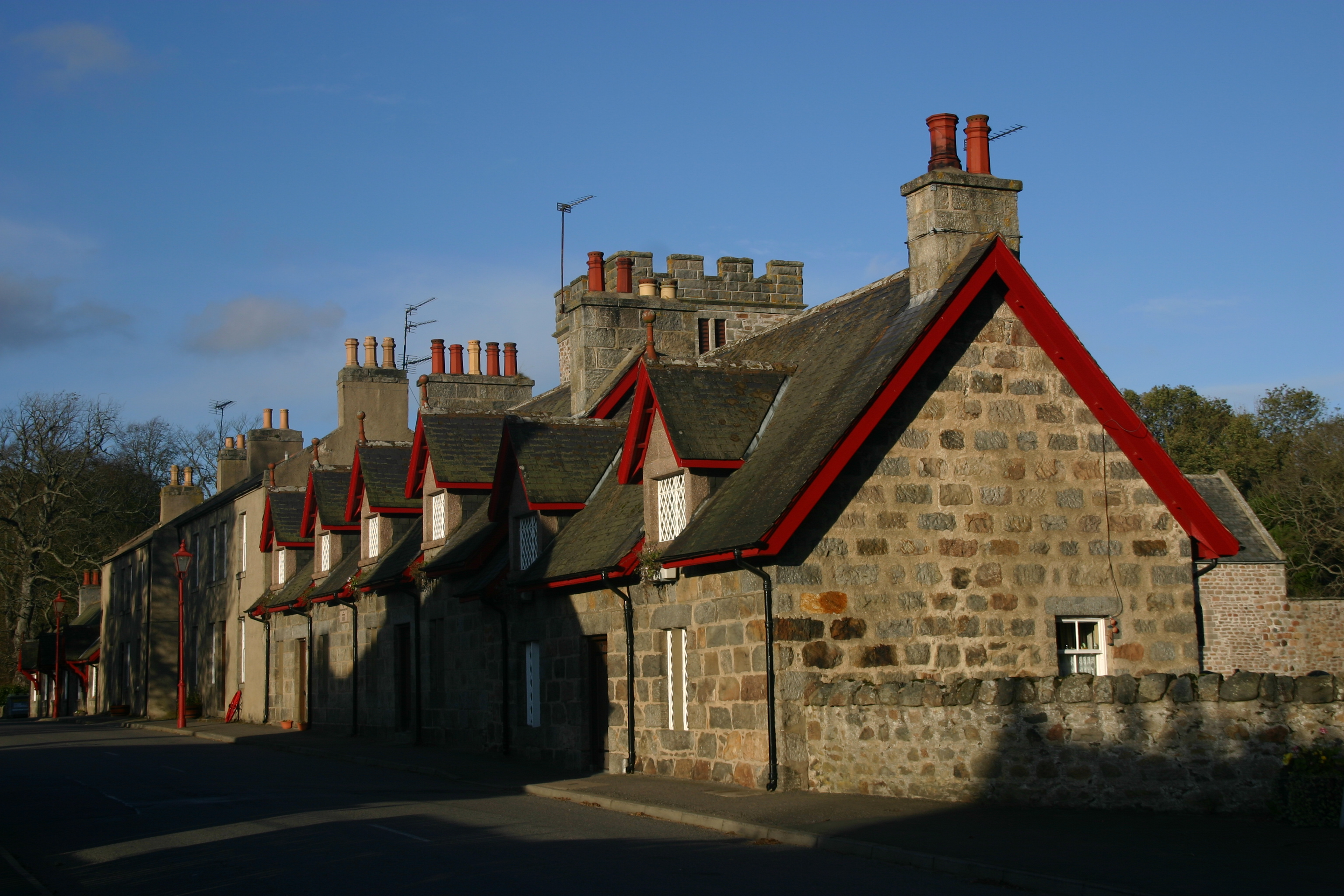
Houses in Monymusk Village Square

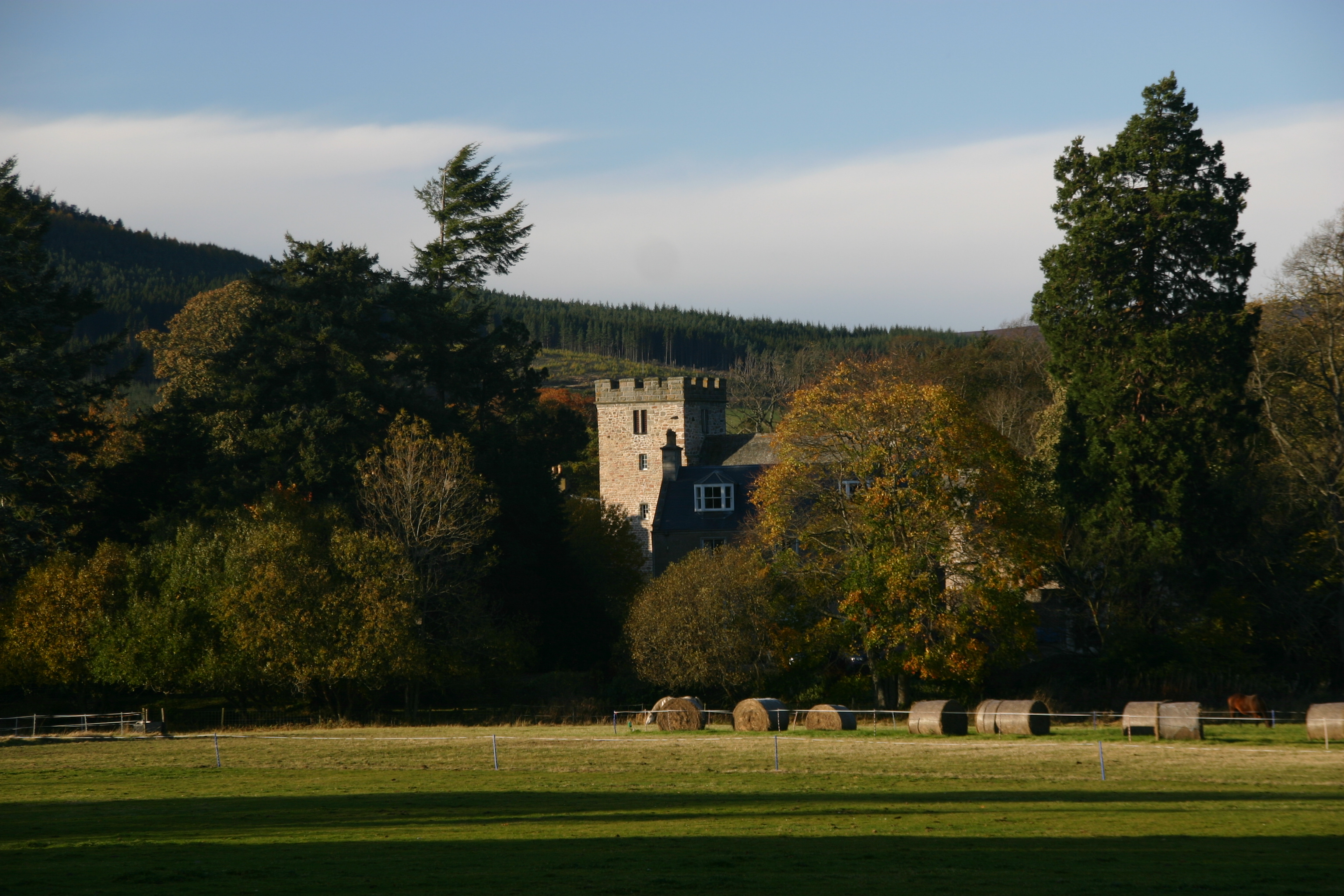
Monymusk Parish Church

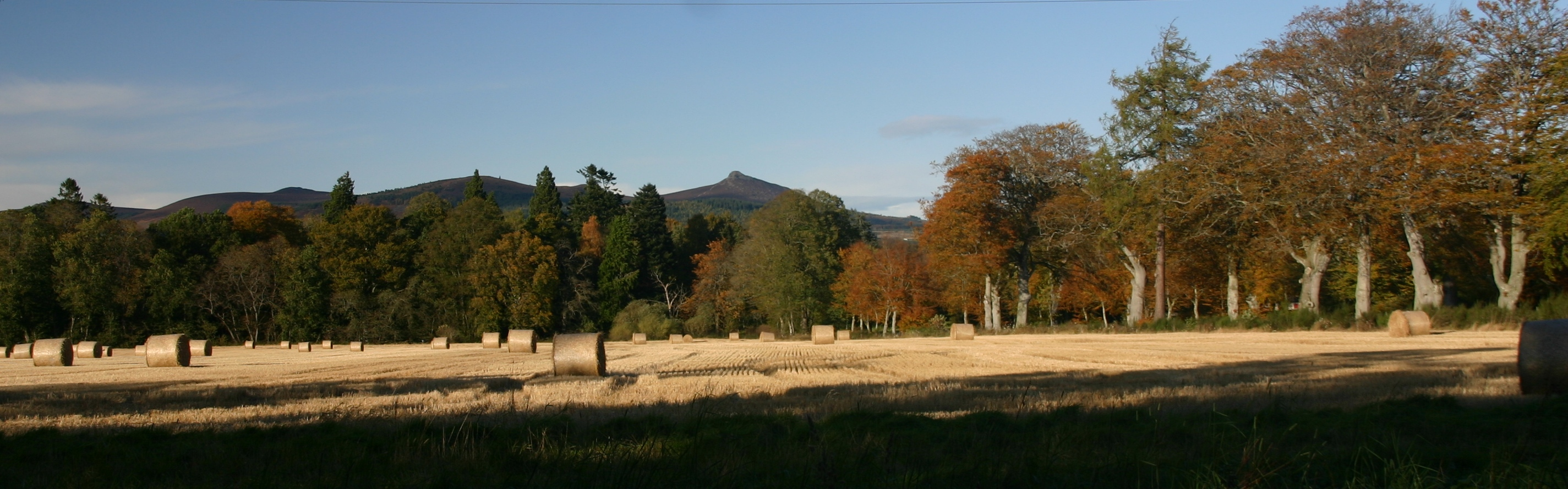
Bennachie from near Monymusk

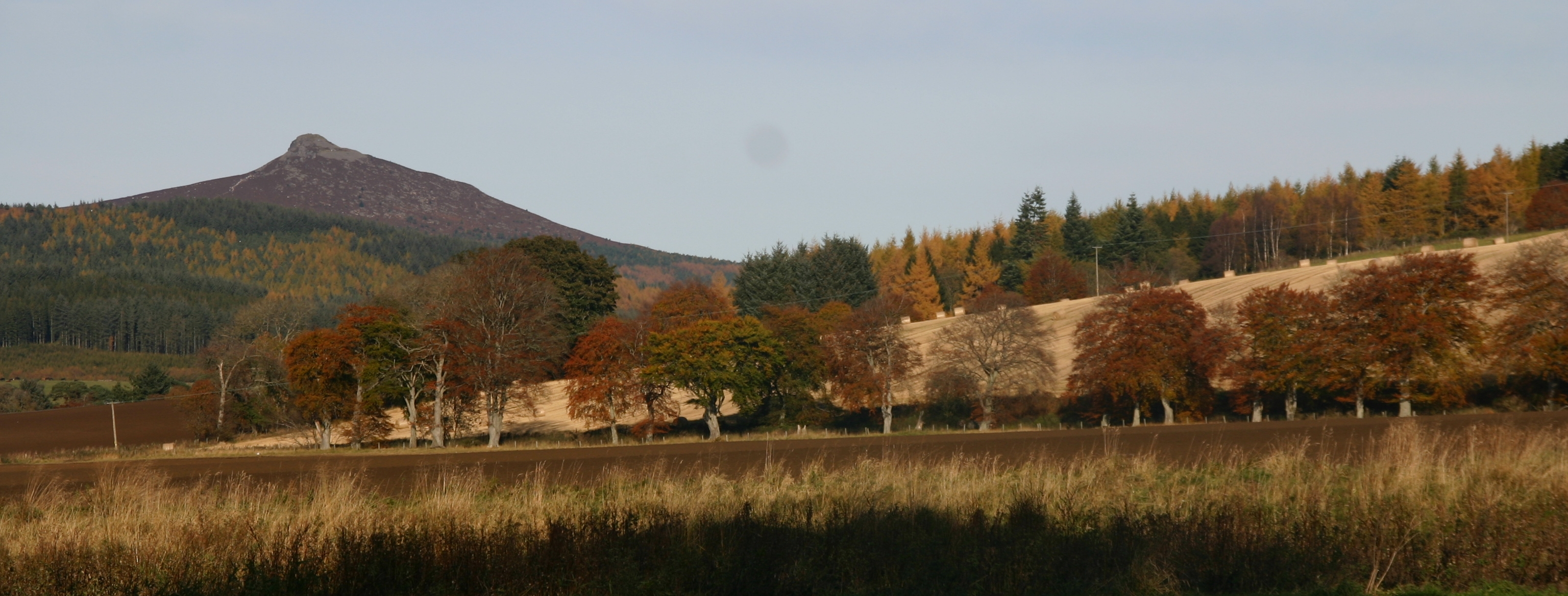
Bennachie from the grounds of the House of Monymusk

== See also ==
- House of Monymusk
- Monymusk Reliquary
