= Kemnay Academy =

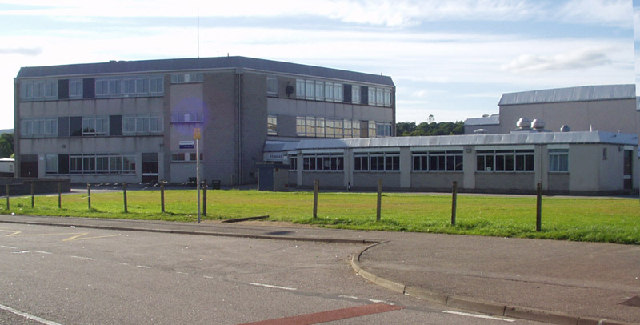
- The front of the school building in 2005, prior to its extension.

Location
- Bremner Way; Kemnay, Aberdeenshire, AB51 5FW; Scotland; 57.2414°N 2.4473°W

Information
- Type: Secondary school
- Established: January 6, 1982
- Local authority: Aberdeenshire Council
- Rector: Kyle Scott
- Gender: Co-educational
- Age: 11 to 18
- Enrolment: 1000 (approx)
- Houses: Bennachie, Caskieben, Don, Tuach, Fetternear
- Colours: Black, green and purple
- School years: S1–S6
- Website: Kemnay Academy

Kemnay Academy is a secondary school in Kemnay, Aberdeenshire, situated on the banks of the River Don. It is one of seventeen secondary schools run by Aberdeenshire Council and has roughly 1000 pupils. The current rector is Kyle Scott who took up the position after previous rector, Lizbeth Paul, left in January 2024.

== History ==
Built in 1980 and opened in 1982, Kemnay Academy was initially created in response to a growing need for a secondary school to accommodate the growing number of pupils in Kintore and Kemnay who previously went to Inverurie Academy. After its construction, Kemnay Academy originally served the surrounding Kemnay and Kintore communities and their three feeder primary schools (Kintore Primary, Kemnay Primary, Alehousewells Primary). At the turn of the century, Kemnay Academy began accepting pupils from the neighbouring Kinellar Primary School in Blackburn. A second primary school in Kintore, Midmill School, was opened in November 2016 and became the fifth feeder school to Kemnay Academy.

In June 2015, Former Provost of Aberdeenshire Jill Webster officially opened the school's new £14.3 million extension. It included a new gym, a music room, biomass heating plant, additional support for learning facilities and extra classroom space.

At the end of July 2024, a new bus park was built to ease road congestion in the area

== Notable former pupils ==
- Rachel Kelly – Award winning journalist and Radio Presenter
- Darren Mackie – Former Aberdeen F.C. and Turriff United F.C. professional footballer
- Paul Lawrie – Golfer
