= House of Monymusk =

House in Aberdeenshire, Scotland

Coordinates: 57.22888°N 2.51692°W

Designations

Inventory of Gardens and Designed Landscapes in Scotland
- Official name: Monymusk
- Designated: 1 July 1987
- Reference no.: GDL00289

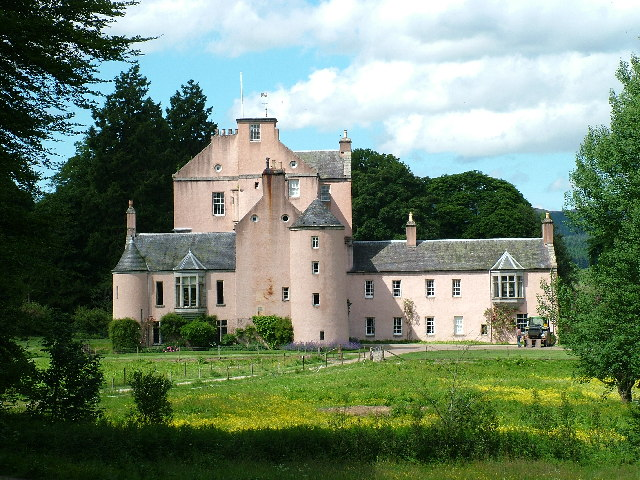

The House of Monymusk is a country house on the outskirts of the village of Monymusk, in the Marr area of Aberdeenshire, Scotland. It stands near the River Don. It is a Category A listed building. The village dates back to at least 1170 and was acquired by the Forbes family in the 1560s. The house originated as an L-plan tower house dating from about 1587, with additional storeys added in the 18th century and later wings constructed in the 19th century. It remained in Forbes ownership until 1712, when it was sold to the Grant family.
