= Alford, Aberdeenshire =

Village in Aberdeenshire, Scotland

Coordinates: 57.23°N 02.71°W

Alford: Scottish Gaelic: Athfort; Scots: Aaford, Awfort
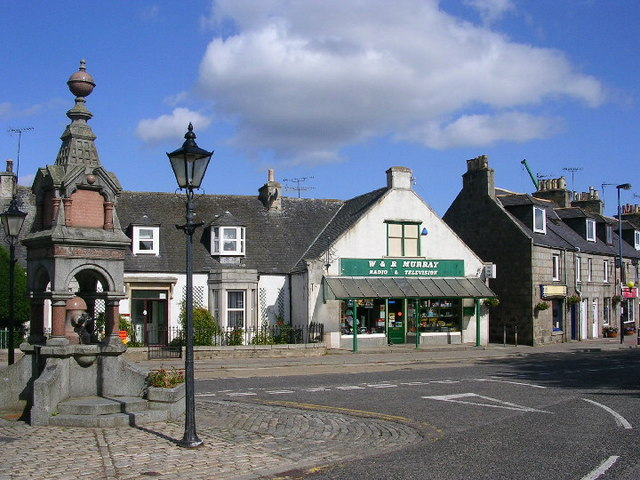

- Location within Aberdeenshire
- Population: 2,610 (2020)
- OS grid reference: NJ5716
  - Edinburgh: 90 mi (145 km)
  - London: 409 mi (658 km)
- Council area: Aberdeenshire
- Country: Scotland
- Sovereign state: United Kingdom
- Post town: Alford
- Postcode district: AB33
- Dialling code: 01507
- Police: Scotland
- Fire: Scottish
- Ambulance: Scottish
- UK Parliament: West Aberdeenshire and Kincardine
- Scottish Parliament: Aberdeenshire West

Alford (pronounced /ˈɑːfərd/ Scots: Aaford or Awfort, Scottish Gaelic: Athfort) is a large village in Aberdeenshire, north-east Scotland, lying just south of the River Don. It lies within the Howe of Alford (also called the Vale of Alford) which occupies the middle reaches of the River Don.

The "L" sound in the place-name has, over time, been dropped, and is silent. Alford gave its name to the Battle of Alford (1645). It is also the home of the Aberdeen Angus cattle breed, which is celebrated by a life-sized model of a bull on the edge of the village, which the Queen Mother inaugurated in 2001. It is believed that the original breeding ground of the cattle was Buffal, located between Tough (Tulloch) and Craigievar nearby Alford.

The Alford Valley Railway, Grampian Transport Museum, Alford Heritage Museum and Craigievar Castle are visitor attractions, with a range of other archaeological sites, stone circles, and castles (including Balfluig Castle, Castle Fraser and Drum Castle) also nearby. One stone circle, originally believed to be prehistoric, turned out to be a 20-year-old replica.

== Sport ==
Alford Golf Club opened on 15 May 1981. Initially a nine-hole course, it reopened as an eighteen-hole course in May 1992.

== Public transport ==
Alford railway station was the former terminus of the closed Alford Valley Railway branch line.

There is a bus service connecting with Aberdeen, approximately 26 miles (42 km) away. There is much new housebuilding going on in Alford as of 2006 to cater for a workforce who mainly commute in Aberdeen to work in the oil industry. Bus services are operated by Stagecoach, with dial-a-bus services being operated by Aberdeenshire Council. Bus services connecting Alford to Aberdeen go by two different routes:

- the 218 goes via Westhill
- the X20 goes via Kintore and Kemnay.

== Notable residents ==
- Charles Murray renowned poet born in Alford
- Stewart Milne, chairman of the Stewart Milne Group and Aberdeen Football Club. Born nearby and attended school in Alford
- John Forbes, minister exiled by James VI
- Lord Forbes, of Forbes Castle
- William McCombie, pioneer Aberdeen Angus breeder
- Laura Main, actress in Call the Midwife
- Emeli Sandé, award-winning singer/songwriter.
- Dougie Gray, Rangers F.C. fullback
- William Minto, critic and novelist
