= Kemnay railway station =

Former railway station in Scotland

Kemnay
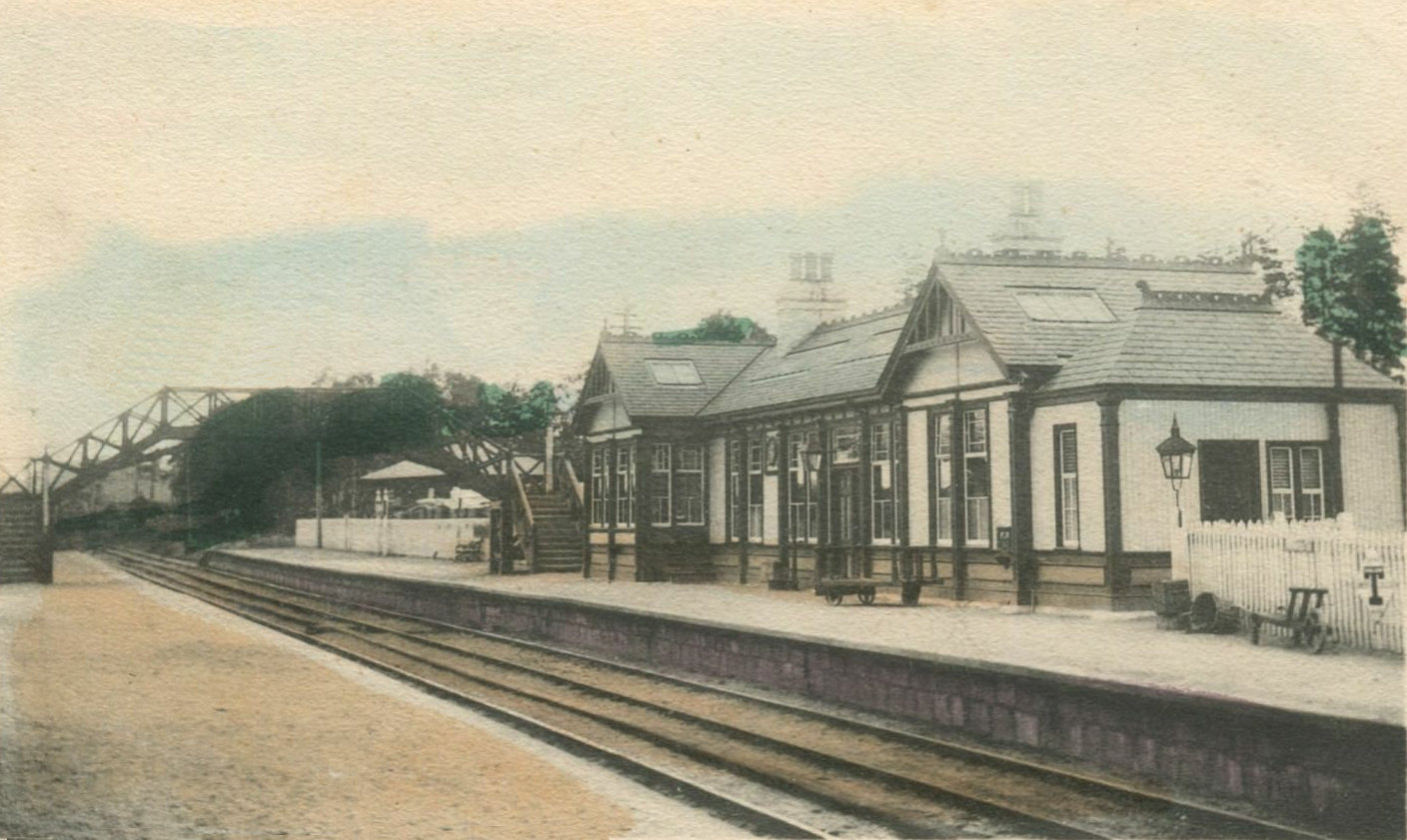

General information
- Location: Kemnay, Aberdeenshire; Scotland
- Coordinates: 57.2345°N 2.4469°W
- Platforms: 2

Other information
- Status: Disused

History
- Original company: Alford Valley Railway
- Pre-grouping: Great North of Scotland Railway
- Post-grouping: LNER

Key dates
- 25 March 1859: Opened
- 2 January 1950: Closed
Location

Kemnay railway station was a station on the Alford Valley Railway in Kemnay, Aberdeenshire, which opened in 1858 and closed in 1950.

Preceding station	Historical railways	Following station
Monymusk; Line and station closed	Great North of Scotland Railway; Alford Valley Railway	Kintore; Line and station closed
