= Kemnay House =

17th-century tower house in Aberdeenshire, Scotland

- Kemnay, Aberdeenshire, Scotland
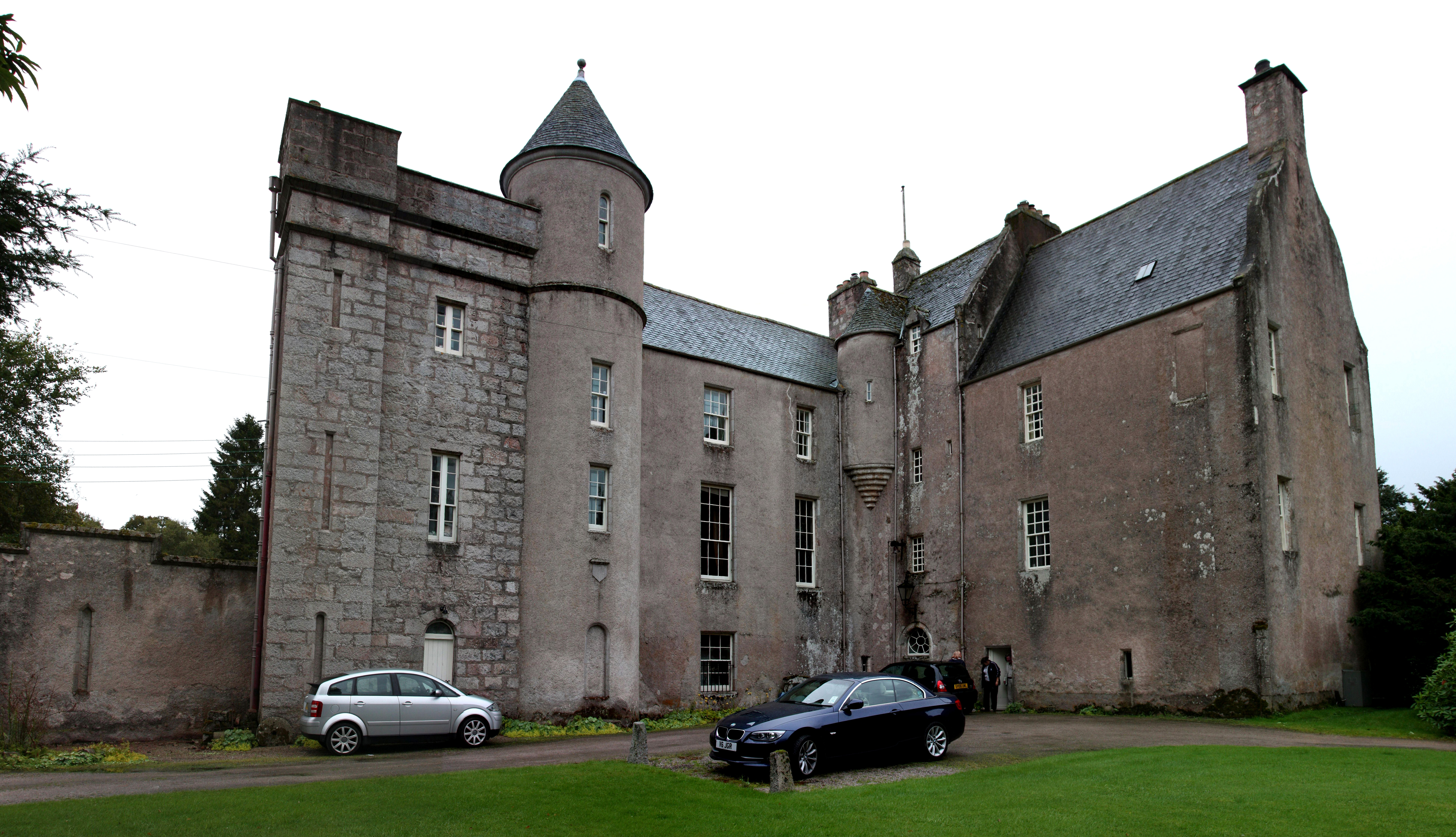
- Kemnay House in 2011

Location
- Coordinates: 57.22784865°N 2.442272462°W

Site history
- Built: 17th century

Kemnay House is a 17th-century tower house, later incorporated into a larger house, about 5.5 miles (8.9 km) south-west of Inverurie, and 0.5 miles (0.8 km) south of Kemnay, in Aberdeenshire, Scotland, to the south of the River Don.

== History ==
During the 16th century, Kemnay was a property of the Douglases of Glenbervie. It was later acquired by the Crombie family, who built the present tower house in the 17th century. In 1682, George Nicolson of Cluny purchased the Kemnay House and estate from Alexander Strachan of Glenkindie. On 5 July 1682, he was appointed a Senator of the College of Justice and subsequently adopted the title Lord Kemnay. Thomas Burnett of Leys purchased it from him in 1688; Thomas was subsequently imprisoned in the Bastille, Paris, at the instigation of Jacobite enemies.

Alterations, including the extension of the wings, took place in 1833. The house is still occupied.

== Structure ==
The original tower house was a tall L-plan building. The entrance, in the re-entrant angle, and originally surmounted by a stair turret rising from the second floor, has been replaced. There is a vaulted basement, with the kitchen in the wing. The cream-washed walls are pierced by small windows. The three-storey wing, which has a bell gable, was an addition in 1688. There are traces of a curtain wall. The porch on the west front, and a granite water tower, were additions in 1833.

== See also ==
- Castles in Great Britain and Ireland
- List of castles in Scotland
