= Alford Valley Railway (GNoSR) =

Historic railway in Scotland

Alford Valley Railway (GNSR)
Overview
- Locale: Scotland
- Dates of operation: 23 March 1859–30 July 1866
- Successor: Great North of Scotland Railway

Technical
- Track gauge: 1,435 mm (4 ft 8 1/2 in)

The Alford Valley Railway was a railway company that built a branch line in Scotland, connecting Alford and Kintore on the main line of the Great North of Scotland Railway (GNSR), giving access to Aberdeen. The line was opened in 1859. It struggled financially from the outset, and it was only support from the GNSR that enabled it to continue. The GNSR absorbed it in 1866.

Passenger carryings were never busy, but granite from quarries near the line was a dominant traffic; in the twentieth century timber was also an important business. In the 1930s passenger and general goods traffic was heavily abstracted by road competition, and the line was closed to passengers in 1950, and completely in 1966.

== History ==
=== Early proposals ===
Alford Valley Railway Act 1846
- Act of Parliament
- Parliament of the United Kingdom
- Long title: An Act for making a Railway from Kintore to Alford, to be called "The Alford Valley Railway."
- Citation: 9 & 10 Vict. c. cxxxiv

Dates
- Royal assent: 3 July 1846

Alford was a small market town and regional centre in the valley of the River Don, Aberdeenshire. As the railway network developed in the north of Scotland, there were a number of proposals to connect the town. On 26 June 1846 the Great North of Scotland Railway was authorised to build a line from Aberdeen to Inverness. A week later, on 3 July 1846 an act of Parliament, the Alford Valley Railway Act 1846 (9 & 10 Vict. c. cxxxiv), authorised the Alford Valley Railway to build a line from Kintore on the unbuilt GNoSR line to Alford along the Alford Valley. (Note: Vallance, Carter and Grant agree on the date of the authorising act of Parliament; Ross incorrectly has 14 July 1846.) The authorised share capital was £100,000. However in the aftermath of the Railway Mania there was widespread financial panic and it proved impossible to generate subscriptions, and the company was unable to proceed. In fact in December 1850 the company was wound up due to inability to raise money. Only £4,344 of its £100,000 capital had been subscribed, and investors got back only £2 16s of their £5 deposit on each £50 share.

In 1854 the idea of a railway to Alford was revived, and a plan was made to make a railway from a junction with the GNoSR main line at Buchanstone to Alford, with a 700-yard tunnel through the Bryndie Hill, and very severe gradients. However better gradients and a line without a tunnel could be made by going from Kintore through Tillyfourie, and this was the line for which sanction was sought from Parliament. There were two other schemes put forward in the same year for railways to Alford: one was to continue the Deeside Railway from its Banchory terminus, through Lumphanan and Cushnie to Alford. This line was surveyed but an alternative, also promoted by the Deeside Company was advanced. It was called the Deeside and Alford Valley Extension Railway. Yet another proposal was to build a line from Colford on the Deeside line, through Echt and Waterton to Tillyfourie, and from there to Alford. Both the proposed lines were to have their terminus at a point near the crossroads which are south of the Bridge of Alford and about a mile from the village itself.

At a public meeting the Deeside scheme was approved by a very large majority, but in Parliament, preference took another turn, chiefly because the Kintore junction with the GNoSR gave much more flexibility for connectional journeys for both passengers and goods, as compared to the Deeside connection.

=== Authorisation ===
Alford Valley Railway Act 1856
- Act of Parliament
- Parliament of the United Kingdom
- Long title: An Act to authorize the making of a Railway from the Great North of Scotland Railway to Afford in the County of Aberdeen, to be called "The Alford Valley Railway."
- Citation: 19 & 20 Vict. c. xl

Dates
- Royal assent: 23 June 1856

Text of statute as originally enacted

It was the Alford Valley Railway, backed by the GNoSR, that was authorised by Parliament in the Alford Valley Railway Act 1856 (19 & 20 Vict. c. xl), on 23 June 1856. The Great North of Scotland Railway would subscribe £15,000 of the necessary capital, and would work the line. At a shareholders' meeting, the GNoSR board was challenged as to the purpose of this expenditure (and similar subscriptions to other branch lines) and it was stated that "The aim of the company in making these investments as the smallest sums that could be advanced to enable the proprietors and tenants to develop the traffic of a district". Authorised capital was £85,000.

In fact the authorised extent of the line was to the south end of Alford Bridge, which spanned the River Don. There was a small community of the same name on the north side of the bridge.

== Opening ==
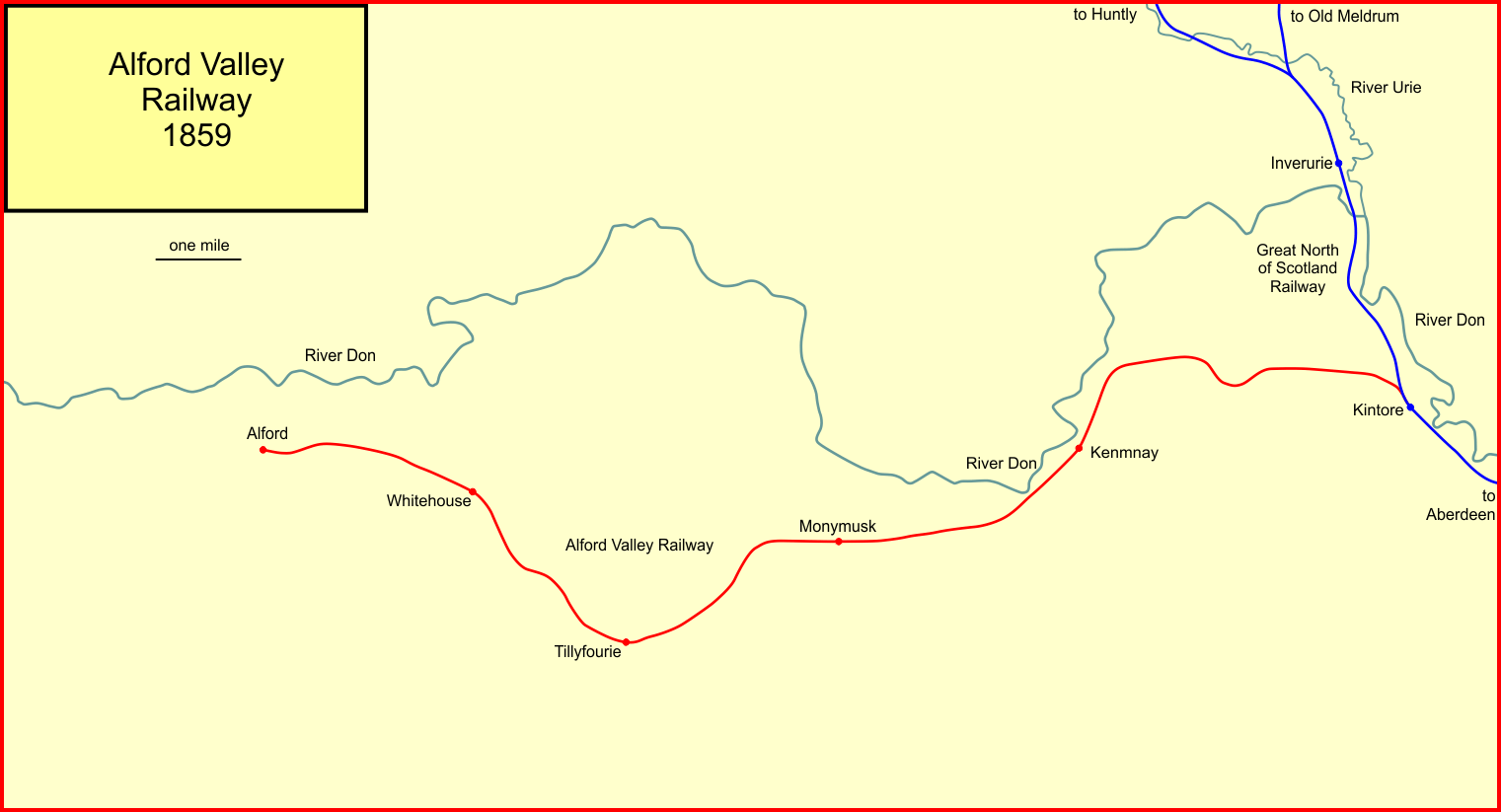
The Alford Valley Railway

The Alford Valley Railway had been expected to open in August 1858, but there were delays in completing the construction. There are differing accounts of the actual opening day: 21 March 1859, or "the official opening was 30 July" but 25 March 1859; Carter says "21 November 21 1859, or according to contemporary authorities, in March of that year".

Alford Valley Railway Amendment Act 1862
- Act of Parliament
- Parliament of the United Kingdom
- Long title: An Act for granting further Powers to the Alford Valley Railway Company.
- Citation: 25 & 26 Vict. c. lxxxvii

Dates
- Royal assent: 30 June 1862

Text of statute as originally enacted

The original authorised route had been as far as Alford Bridge, but the shortage of money brought home awareness that a further mile of railway to serve a hamlet was an unnecessary expense. In fact construction of this final section was abandoned by the Alford Valley Railway Amendment Act 1862 (25 & 26 Vict. c. lxxxvii).

The line was steeply graded, with climbs of 1 in 75 on either side of the summit at Tillyfourie, but the engineering works were light. A service of four passenger trains was provided in each direction, all of which called at the intermediate stations of Kemnay, Monymusk and Whitehouse. In 1860 an additional station was opened at Tillyfourie.

The line served Kemnay Quarry and three other granite quarries in the area, and mineral traffic on the branch was dominant. The Kemnay quarry was the most important:

The quarries at Kemnay leased by Mr John Fyfe are the largest in the north, more material being sent out from them than from all others in the county. Situated in close proximity to the Kemnay station on the Alford Valley Railway every facility is present to develop the work. On an average Mr Fyfe gives work to 250 men all the year round, and these with the aid of steam power, which he was the first to introduce in the quarrying of granite, turn out several thousand tons of stone monthly which goes partly to the home and partly to the foreign markets.

The summit of the line is just west of Tillyfourie at 618 feet (188 metres) above sea level, where a mile-long cutting 30 feet (9 metres) deep required cutting through particularly hard granite. The train took just over an hour for the 16-mile journey.

=== Financial difficulties ===
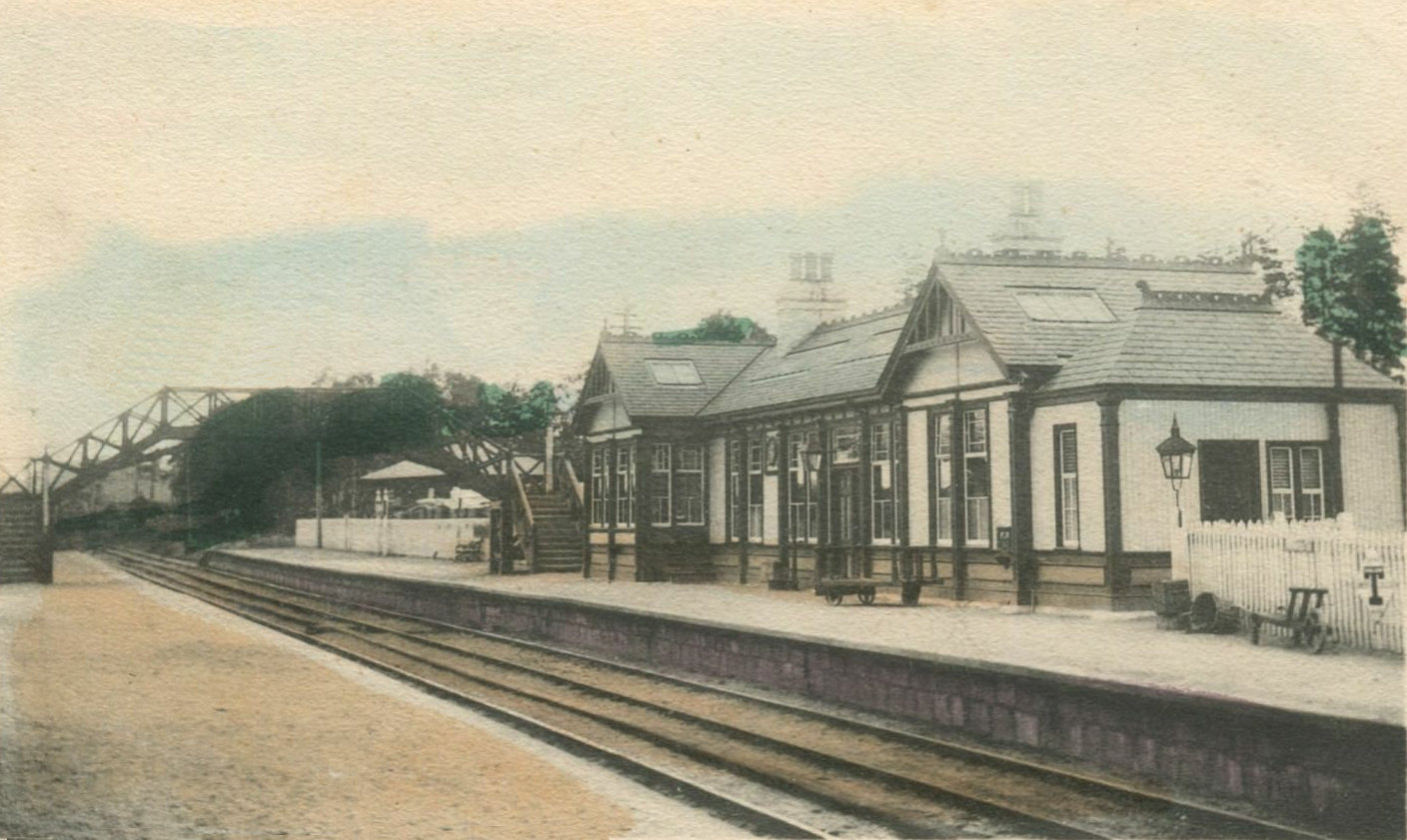
Kemnay station after provision of the passing loop

Running through purely agricultural terrain to a small town with about 1,200 inhabitants, the line did not thrive financially. The poor roads locally made Lumphanan on the Deeside line an easier railhead. Nevertheless the granite industry around Kemnay provided good business for the railway, in a form of symbiosis, where the moribund quarries were revived by the cheap transport now available to Aberdeen.

In December 1860 the Alford Valley Railway (AVR) held its fifth annual meeting; a poor harvest was blamed for a disappointing set of accounts. The net revenue was only £1,173 12s 3d, but 5% interest on the company's borrowings amounted to £3,312, leaving the company in the red. The GNoSR was working the line not on an agreed percentage of the gross revenue but at prime cost, including £75 a year for the use of Kintore Station. A shareholder, Dr Garden of Alford suggested that the AVR was being run by the GNoSR for its own benefit, to which the chairman reminded the meeting that the GNoSR had "given" the Alford company £15,000 in shares and a £30,000 loan, for which it had to borrow money at 4.5%. Of the authorised £76,500 capital, only £37,291 15s 0d had been paid up, and he asked why local proprietors had not bought more shares in the line.

The following year the AVR was unable to meet its financial obligations, and in the winter of 1861 the GNoSR asked Parliament for authority to subscribe further sums to the AVR, and to guarantee payment of interest and principal on its mortgage debt; this was approved in the Great North of Scotland Railway Amendment Act 1862 (25 & 26 Vict. c. lxii).

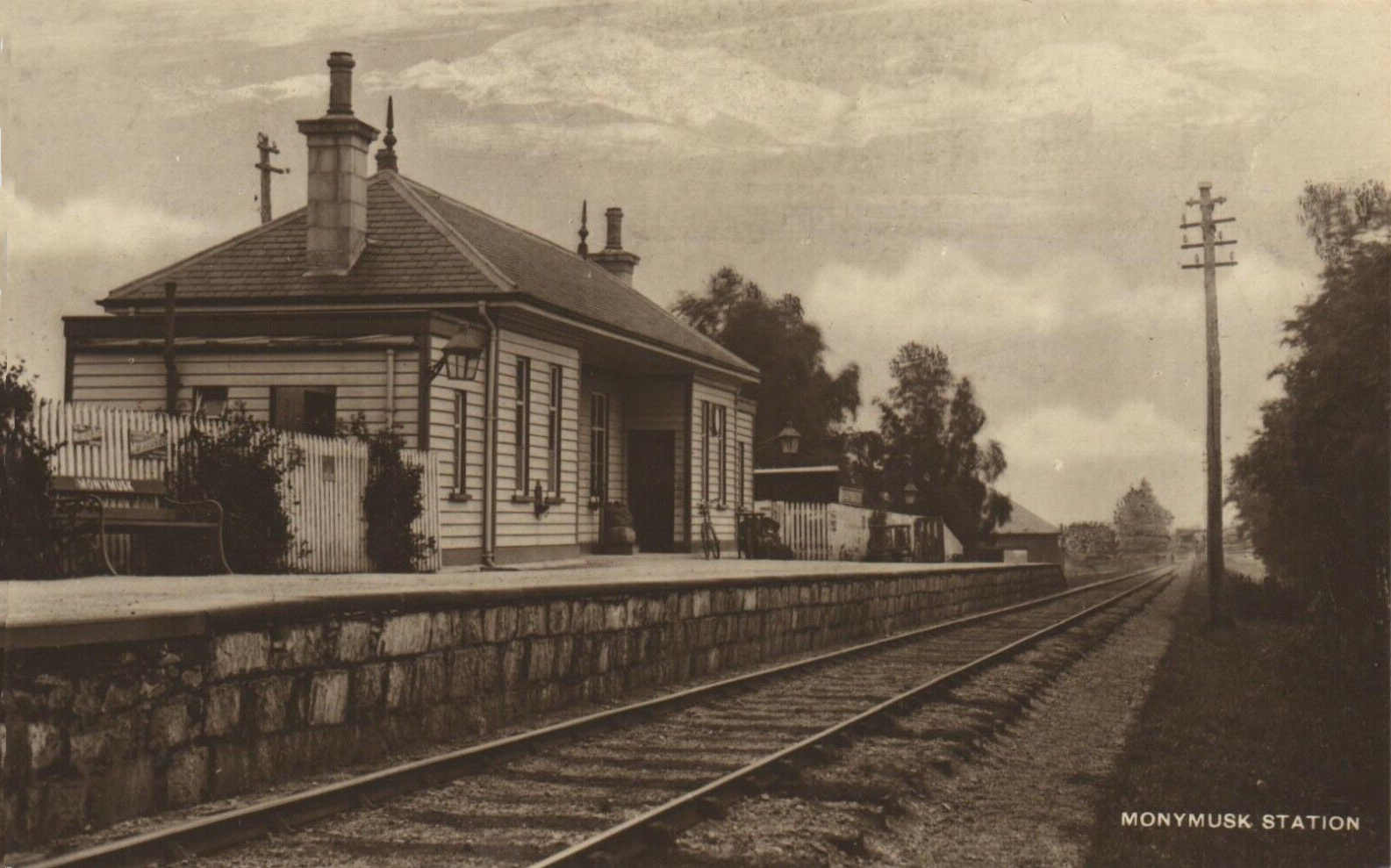
Monymusk station

The Alford Valley Railway was trying to raise capital through a bill for preference shares. Once again Dr Garden asked a question: what had become of the original capital of the line – £64,920? There had been 163 shareholders, of whom four had subscribed for £61,000 worth of shares but had never paid anything towards them. Adam explained that the unnamed four had transferred their shares before any call for payment was made, something the directors could not prevent. The persons in whose names the shares now stood were unable to pay, and the shares were now forfeited. So the Alford Valley Railway, with an authorised capital of £100,000, and built at a cost of well over £70,000, had an actual paid-up capital of £3,920.

=== Amalgamation ===
A bill was lodged for amalgamation of the Alford Valley with the GNoSR. The ordinary shares of the AVR would be cancelled and replaced with GNoSR ordinary stock. In fact the GNoSR was already the major shareholder, with a holding of £59,920; other shareholders in aggregate had £18,140. On 30 July 1866, the GNoSR obtained the Great North of Scotland Railway (Amalgamation) Act 1866 (29 & 30 Vict. c. cclxxxviii) authorising the absorption process.

=== Additions and improvements ===
Some infrastructure improvements were carried out on the line in 1898, with a new station and crossing loop at Kemnay: previously the only crossing station was Tillyfourie – and better facilities at Alford were promised.

In 1903 the GNoSR tried the operation of steam railcars in an attempt to reduce costs on branch lines. They were used on the Alford branch (among others) but were not successful because of noise problems and inadequate boilers. After a year of intermittent and unreliable service they were scrapped.

Two unadvertised halts were later opened for workmen: at Paradise Siding at national grid reference NJ735172, opened by 1884, and closed after 1938, and at Ratch-Hill Siding NJ767173 opened about 1903; it closed after 1938.

=== From 1923 ===
In 1923 GNoSR was incorporated into the London and North Eastern Railway in the process called the grouping of the railways, following the Railways Act 1921 (11 & 12 Geo. 5. c. 55). In 1948 it was nationalised, and became part of the Scottish Region of British Railways.

The GNoSR was effective in the transport of timber. This became particularly important during World War II, when the Canadian Forestry Corps set up a depot at Kemnay.

== Closure ==
The continued increase in operating costs, and the decline in local traffic after the end of the Second World War, resulted in the closure to passengers of the Alford branch on 2 January 1950. On 3 January the line above Paradise Sidings was closed, the mineral operation there continuing for the time being. On 7 November 1966 the line was completely closed.

== Officers ==
During the period of independent existence of the Alford Valley Railway Company, 1856 to 1866, the principal officers were

- Chairman: Sir James Elphinstone;
- Secretary: Robert Milne;
- Engineer: Alexander Gibb.

== Locations ==
- Alford; opened 21 March 1859; closed 2 January 1950;
- Whitehouse; opened 21 March 1859; closed 2 January 1950;
- Tillyfourie; opened 2 June 1860; closed 2 January 1950;
- Tillyfourie Quarry;
- Monymusk; opened 21 March 1859; closed 2 January 1950;
- Dalriach Farm; temporary station for Volunteer Camp at farm of Nether Mains, about 500 yards away; arrivals 19 June 1885; about 1 1/2 miles from Kemnay, towards Monymusk;
- Kemnay; opened 21 March 1859; closed 2 January 1950;
- Paradise Siding; non timetable halt for workmen; in use at least 1884 to 1938 "for Mr Fyfe's workmen";
- Ratch Hill; for Thomas Tait’s granite quarry; first use unknown date; sometimes called Ratch Hill Siding; for Mr. Fyfe's quarrymen; in 1938 timetable shows all trains stopping by request;
- Kintore; GNoSR station, opened 20 September 1854; closed 7 December 1964; a new Kintore station was opened 15 October 2020 some distance to the north.

== Current activity ==
Apart from a short section at Alford which has been reopened as the narrow gauge Alford Valley Community Railway, the line has been dismantled.
