= Kemnay, Aberdeenshire =

Coordinates: 57.23392°N 2.44890°W

Kemnay: Scottish Gaelic: Camnaidh
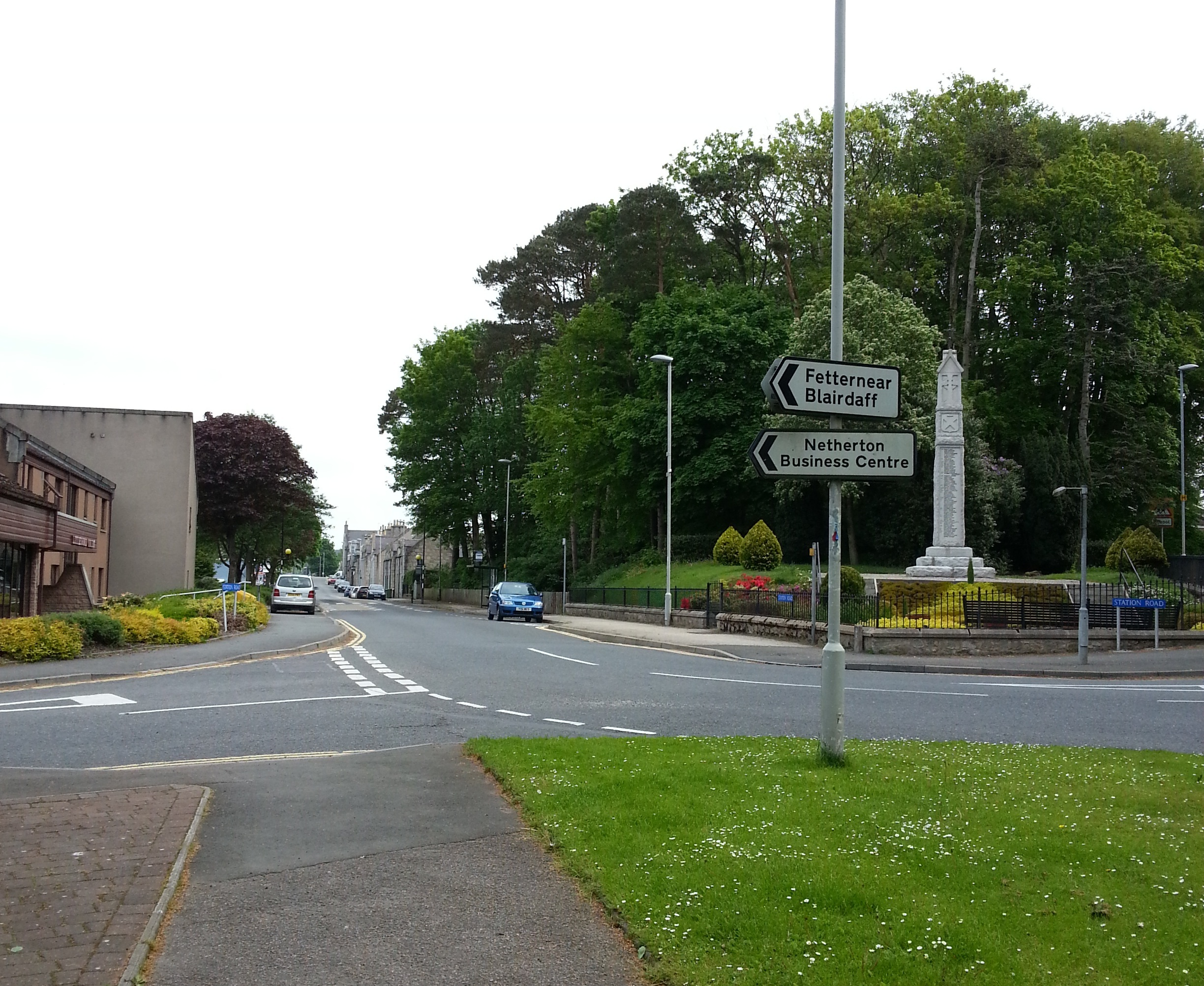
- Kemnay, war memorial and main street.

- Location within Aberdeenshire
- Population: 3,890 (2020)
- OS grid reference: NJ730158
- Council area: Aberdeenshire
- Lieutenancy area: Aberdeenshire
- Country: Scotland
- Sovereign state: United Kingdom
- Post town: INVERURIE
- Postcode district: AB51
- Dialling code: 01467
- Police: Scotland
- Fire: Scottish
- Ambulance: Scottish
- UK Parliament: West Aberdeenshire and Kincardine
- Scottish Parliament: Aberdeenshire East

Kemnay (Gaelic: Camnaidh) is a village 16 miles (26 km) west of Aberdeen in Garioch, Aberdeenshire, Scotland.

== History ==
The village name Kemnay is believed to originate from the Celtic words that mean "little crook in the river" due to the village location on the bend of the River Don. Kemnay House is classified by Historic Scotland as a category A listed building.

The village was served by Kemnay railway station on the Alford Valley Railway from 1859 to 1950. The alignment through the village has been lost to housing developments.

The pre-Reformation church was dedicated to St Anne. The parish was united with Craigern in 1500 and both came under the umbrella of nearby Kinkell. The old church was extensively rebuilt in 1632.

The current parish church dates from 1844. The pre-1844 church was of unusual cruciform style, with the earth floor 1m below the surrounding ground, and prone to icing in winter. The two upper galleries were accessed by earth ramps in the graveyard. The church was enlarged in 1871 by Rev George Peter of St Cyrus.

The village was substantially rebuilt after the creation of Kemnay railway station in 1858.

It shares its name with 'Kemnay' a small community in Manitoba, Canada. It is located in the Rural Municipality of Whitehead about 10 kilometres west of Brandon on PTH 1A.

== Notable people ==
- David Leitch (b.1608) minister of the parish and Chaplain to King Charles II

== Religion ==
Kemnay has church buildings available for the following religious groups:

- Church of Scotland
- Roman Catholic
- Scottish Episcopal Church
- Jehovah's Witnesses

== Tourism ==
Kemnay is popular with explorers of Aberdeenshire who can stay in numerous guest houses, hotels, and bed and breakfasts within the village. There is a pub for tourists and guests to stay in, the Bennachie Lodge Hotel. The Burnett Arms Hotel was another option, but is permanently closed as of June 2026.

== Granite ==
Kemnay Quarry was opened in 1830 by John Fyfe, and began commercial operation in 1858. Fyfe invented the Blondin aerial ropeway system at Kemnay in 1872.

Kemnay Granite has been used in many famous buildings and structures, including;

- Cenotaph, Glasgow
- Forth Railway Bridge, Edinburgh/Fife
- Marischal College, Aberdeen
- Kew Bridge and Putney Bridge, London
- Thames Embankment, London

Granite workers from Kemnay helped to quarry and shape the Australian granite used in the Sydney Harbour Bridge. They also travelled to quarries in California, the Mississippi Levees and Odessa.

== Places of interest ==
- James Mitchell Memorial
- Fetternear Estate
- Fetternear Palace, archaeological dig site (Bishop's Palace)
- Johnstone FM Monument
- Kemnay Academy
- View Point (Place of Origin)
- War Memorial
- Kemnay morthouse in the parish churchyard This is dated 1831 over its iron door.

== Sports ==
Kemnay has various sports clubs, including;

- Badminton
- Bowling Club
- Cricket
- Football
- Golf
- Tennis

There are playing fields available for use by the public at Bogbeth Park, which is also home to the Kemnay Skate Park.

Golfer Paul Lawrie, who won the 1999 Open Championship is a former pupil of Kemnay Academy, as is former Aberdeen F.C. footballer Darren Mackie.

In April 2017, a gym opened in the village, Station 83.

== Education ==
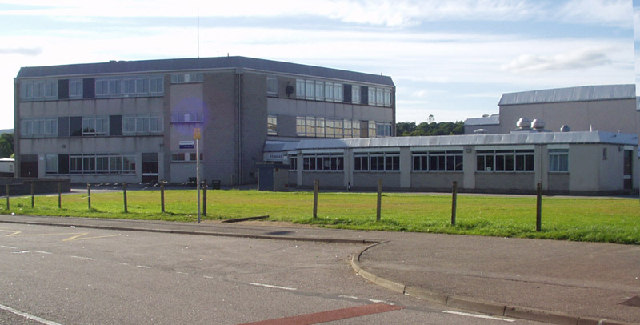
Kemnay Academy in 2005.

In Kemnay, there are two primary schools and one secondary school:

- Kemnay Primary School
- Alehousewells Primary School
- Kemnay Academy, which unveiled a £14.3 million extension in 2015.
