= Buckle (disambiguation) =

A buckle is a clasp used for fastening two things together.

Buckle or Buckles may also refer to:

== Places ==
- Buckle Island, Southern Ocean; an island
- Buckles, Virginia, USA; an unincorporated community
- Robert Buckles Barn, Mount Pulaski, Illinois, USA
- Buckles Mine, Ontario, Canada; a uranium mine

== People with the name ==
- Buckle (surname)
- Abram J. Buckles (1846–1915), American jurist and soldier
- Bradley A. Buckles (born 1949), American lawyer and ATF Director
- Emma Buckles (born 1999), Canadian ice hockey player
- Frank Buckles (1901–2011), last surviving American military veteran of World War I
- Hazel Ann Regis-Buckles (born 1981), Grenadian athlete
- Jess Buckles (1890–1975), American baseball player
- Kasey Buckles (born 1978), American academic in gender studies and economics
- Mariah Buckles (born 1997), American singer-songwriter
- Mary Ann Buckles, former American academic in literature
- Morty Buckles (born 1971), American racecar driver
- Nick Buckles (born 1961), British businessman
- Rakeem Buckles (born 1990), American professional basketball player in the Israeli Basketball Premier League

== Arts, entertainment, and media ==
- Buckle, a character from the American Dad episode, "An Apocalypse to Remember",
- "Buckle", a song by Florence + the Machine from their 2025 album Everybody Scream
- Buckles (comics), a comic strip by David Gilbert about the misadventures of the eponymous anthropomorphic dog

== Groups, organizations ==
- Buckle (clothing retailer)
- Buckle Motors, Australian car dealership chain and former automotive manufacturer

== Other uses ==
- Buckle (casting), a type of casting defect
- Buckle, a type of cobbler (food) used as a dessert
- Buckle, the bottom part of a blimp
- Buckle Sports Coupe, an automobile produced in Australia from 1956 to 1960

== See also ==
- Buckle's Tower, Hill of Heddle, Firth, Orkney, Scotland, UK
- Boucle (disambiguation)
- Buccal (disambiguation)
- Buckling (disambiguation)
