= Boucle =

Boucle may refer to:

- Bouclé, a loop of yarn, or fabric made from yarn loops
- Centre-Chapelle des Buis (also called "La Boucle"), Besançon, Doubs, Bourgogne-Franche-Comté, France; a district
- Montée de la Boucle, 4th arrondissement of Lyon, Lyon, Auvergne-Rhône-Alpes, France; a street
- Grande Boucle Féminine Internationale (la Boucle, la Boucle Féminine, la Grande Boucle, la Grande Boucle Féminine), a feminine equivalent to the Tour de France bicycle race
- Tour de France (la Boucle, la Grande Boucle), a men's professional multi-week bicycle race
- "En boucle", 2015 song by Casseurs Flowters off the album Comment c'est loin
- "En boucle", 2020 song by Naps (rapper) off the album Carré VIP
- La boucle, a ballet; see Ballet at the Edinburgh International Festival: history and repertoire, 1957–1966
- Peter van Boucle (1600–1673), Flemish painter

== See also ==
- La Grande Boucle, a sculpture composed with The Giant of Tourmalet at Col du Tourmalet, france
- Buckle (disambiguation)
