= Firth, Orkney =

Civil parish in Orkney, Scotland

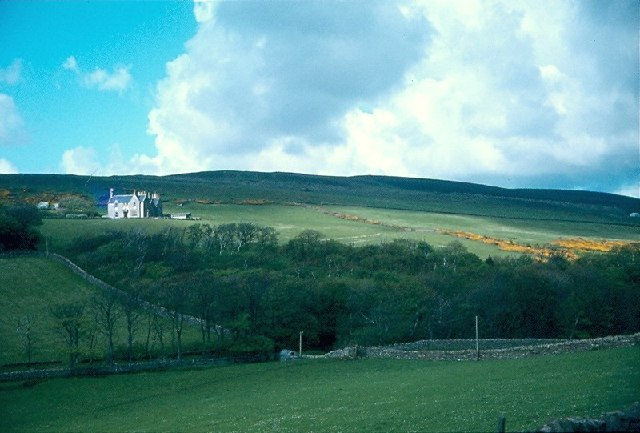
One of the few woods in Orkney at Finstown. The house in the background is Binscarth

Firth (Old Norse: Fjörðr meaning a firth or fjord) is a civil parish mainly on Mainland, Orkney. The islands of Damsay and Holm of Grimbister, which lie in the Bay of Firth, are also in the parish. It is in the west of the mainland island, lying south of the parish of Rendall, east of Harray and Stenness, north of Orphir and west of St Ola.

It is not to be confused with the numerous Firths that surround Orkney.

The main village is Finstown.

Buckle's Tower stands on the Hill of Heddle, just outside Finstown.
