= Buckle (surname) =

Buckle is an English surname, and may refer to:

- Andrew Buckle (born 1982), Australian golfer
- Baldrick Buckle (born 1972), British artist
- Bill Buckle (born 1943), Australian cricketer
- Bobby Buckle (1869–1959), English footballer
- Catherine Buckle, Zimbabwean writer
- Charles G. Palmer-Buckle (born 1950), Ghanaian Catholic archbishop
- Claude Buckle (1905–1973), English painter
- Claude Buckle (admiral) (1803–1894), English naval officer
- Desmond Buckle (1910–1964), Ghanaian political activist
- Francis Buckle (1766–1832), English jockey
- George Earle Buckle (1854–1935), English editor and biographer
- Harry Buckle (1882–?), Irish footballer
- Henry Thomas Buckle (1821–1862), English historian
- John Buckle (1867–1925), British trade unionist and politician
- John William Buckle (1775–1846), solicitor, director of the New Zealand Company in 1825
- Lynn Buckle (fl. 2022), Irish writer
- Paul Buckle (born 1970), English footballer
- Richard Buckle (1916–2001), British ballet critic
- Robert Buckle (1802–1893), English clergyman
- Ted Buckle (1924–1990), English footballer
- Terry Buckle (1940–2020), Canadian archbishop
- Walter Clutterbuck Buckle (1886–1955), Canadian politician
