= Crinkle =

Crinkle may refer to:

- Crinkle Crags, a fell in the English Lake District
- Crinkle-cutting, a cutting technique in cooking
- Chocolate crinkle, a kind of chocolate-flavored cookie covered in white powdered sugar.

== See also ==
- Buckling (disambiguation)
- Crinkill
