= Col du Tourmalet =

Mountain pass in the French Pyrenees

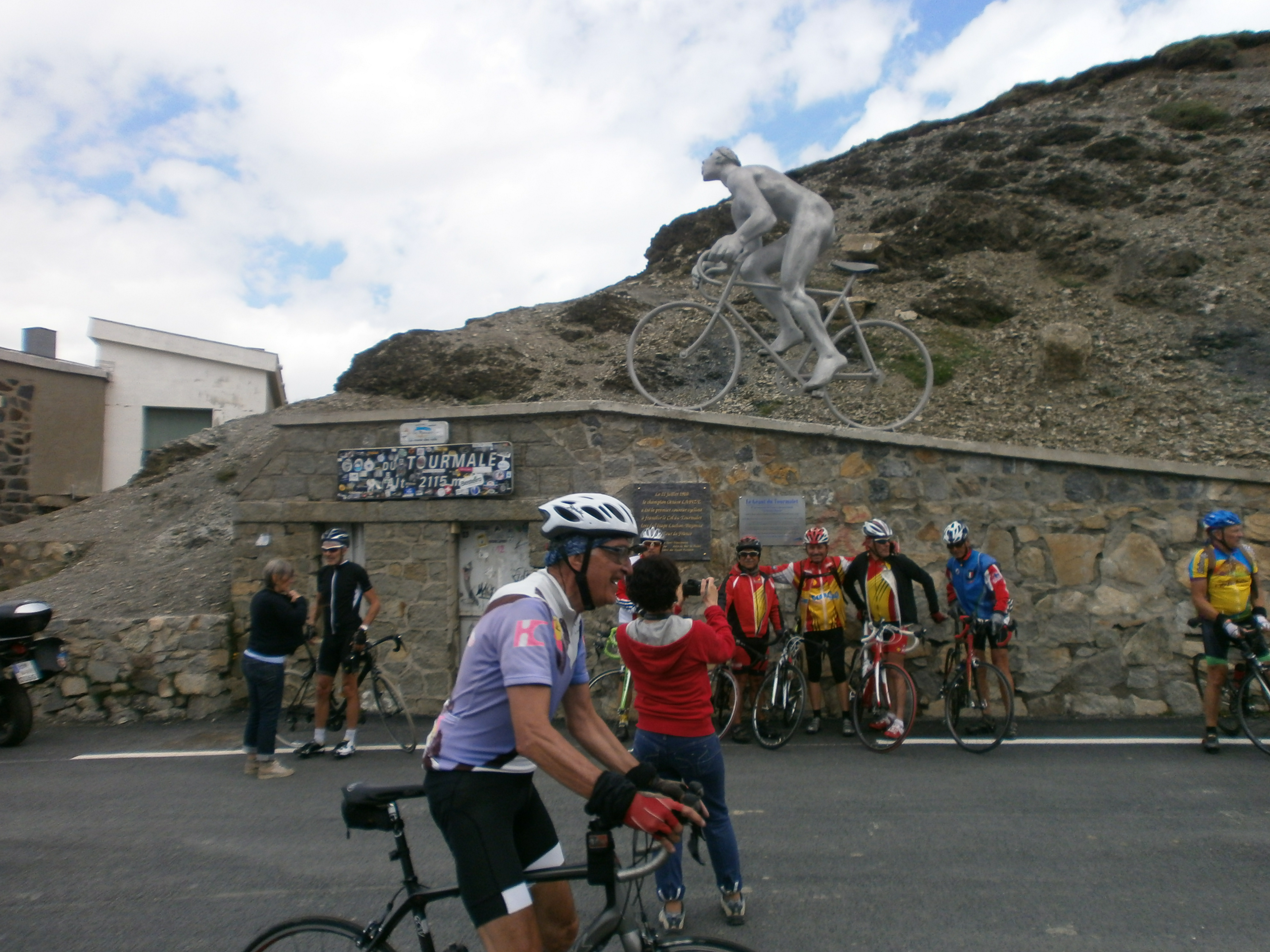
- Summit of the Col du Tourmalet

- Location within Pyrenees
- Elevation: 2,115 m (6,939 ft)
- Traversed by: D918

Third Approach
- Location: Hautes-Pyrénées, France
- Range: Pyrenees
- Coordinates: 42°54′29.5″N 0°8′42.4″E

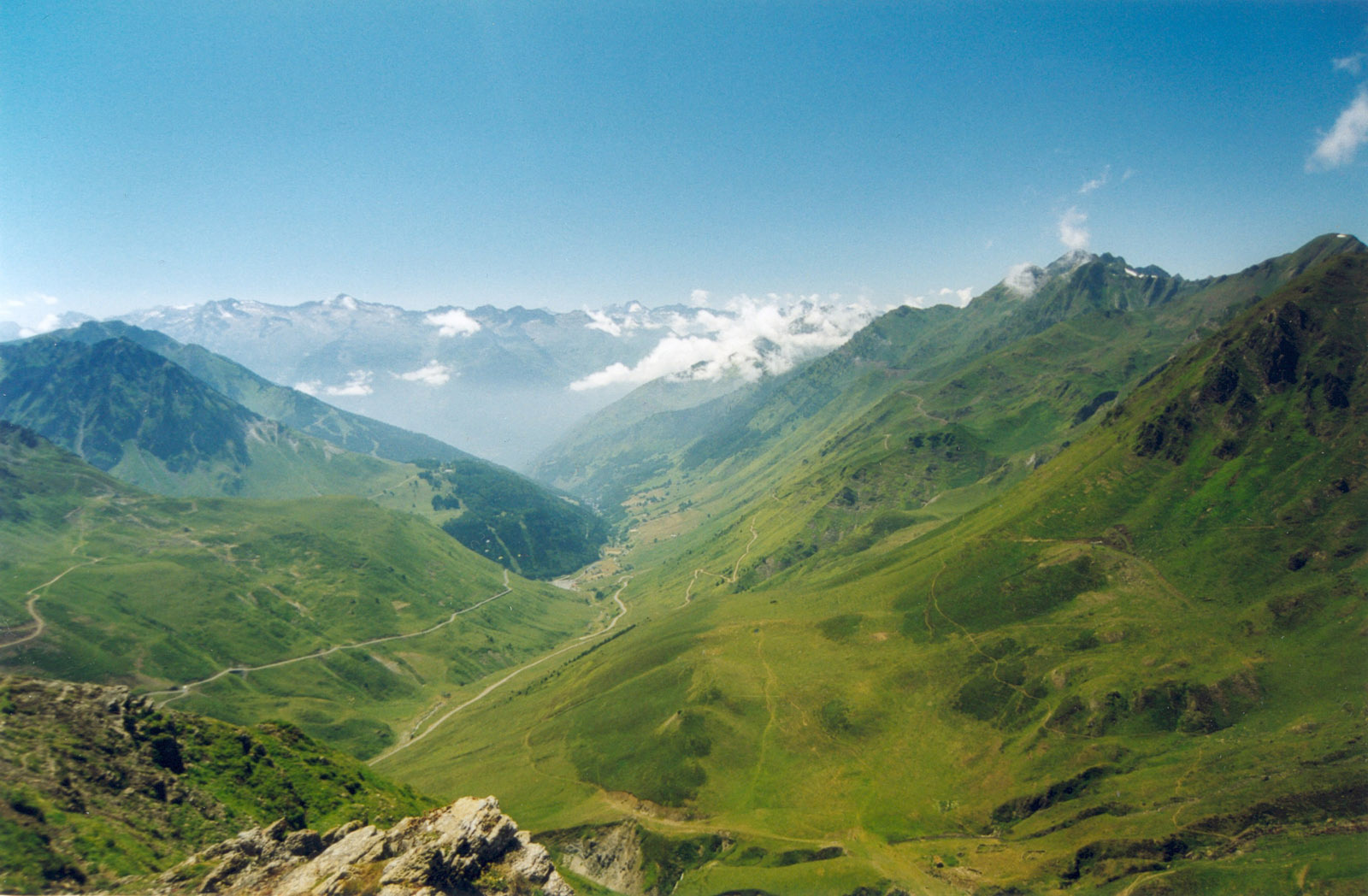
View from the Col du Tourmalet to its western side

Col du Tourmalet (pronounced [tuʁmalɛ]; elevation 2,115 m (6,939 ft)) is one of the highest paved mountain passes in the French Pyrenees, in the department of Hautes-Pyrénées. Sainte-Marie-de-Campan is at the foot on the eastern side and the ski station La Mongie two-thirds of the way up. The village of Barèges lies on the western side, above the town of Luz-Saint-Sauveur.

== Higher roads in the Pyrenees ==
The Col du Tourmalet is the highest paved mountain pass in the French Pyrenees second only to the Col de Portet. So in contrast to frequent claims (see for example), it is neither the highest paved road in the Pyrenees nor the highest paved mountain pass in the Pyrenees. Paved roads leading to the mountain lakes Lac de Cap-de-Long and Lac d'Aumar in the same French Department Hautes-Pyrénées are higher, as these lakes are at altitudes of 2,161 m (7,090 ft) and 2,192 m (7,192 ft), respectively. However, these roads are not mountain passes. Departing directly from the Col du Tourmalet, there is a road to the mountain pass Col de Laquets with an altitude of 2,637 m (8,652 ft) However, this road is not paved. Finally, the highest paved mountain pass in the Pyrenees is the Port d'Envalira in Andorra with its altitude of 2,407 m (7,897 ft).

== Meaning of "Tourmalet" ==
Some Frenchmen believe that Tourmalet translates into "bad trip" or "bad detour" because in French Tour translates into "trip" and mal translates into "bad"; however, the correct language to translate from is Gascon, not French, because of the mountain's location in the Gascony region. Then Tour becomes "distance", which is spelled "tur" but pronounced "tour" and mal is translated into "mountain". The translation from Gascon to English then becomes "Distance Mountain".

Tourmalet is also a cheese made from sheep milk produced in these mountains.

== Details of the climb ==
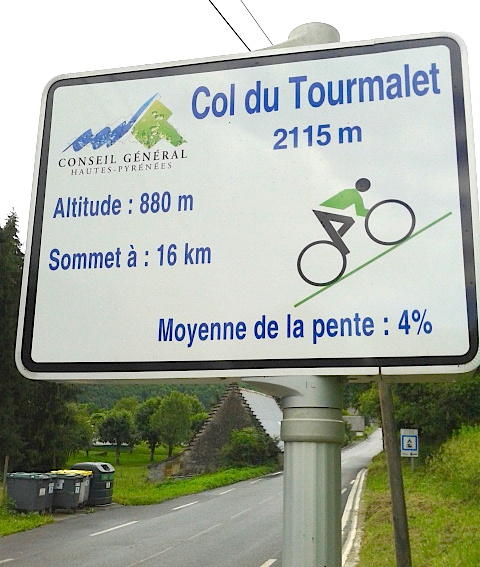
One of the mountain pass cycling milestones along the ascent from Sainte-Marie-de-Campan

The western side, from Luz-Saint-Sauveur, is 19.0 km (11.8 mi) long, climbing 1,404 m (4,606 ft) at an average of 7.4% with a maximum of 10.2% near the summit. Starting from Sainte-Marie-de-Campan, the eastern climb is 17.2 km (10.7 mi), gaining 1,268 m (4,160 ft), at an average of 7.4% with a maximum of 12%. As with most French climbs, each kilometre mountain pass cycling milestones indicate the height of the summit, the distance to the summit, and the average gradient of the next kilometre. According to PJAMM Cycling's ranking system, the east side is the 24th hardest bike climb in France, and the west is ranked 26th.

From the pass, a rough track leads to the Pic du Midi de Bigorre observatory. Up to the Col de Laquets (elevation 2,637 m (8,652 ft)) this track is a dirt and gravel road. The part between the Col de Laquets and the observatory is a steep and narrow hiking track. Some terraces of the observatory can be entered for free from the end of the track. Paying an entrance fee, one can enter the actual observatory and also take the cable car down to La Mongie.

== Tour de France ==
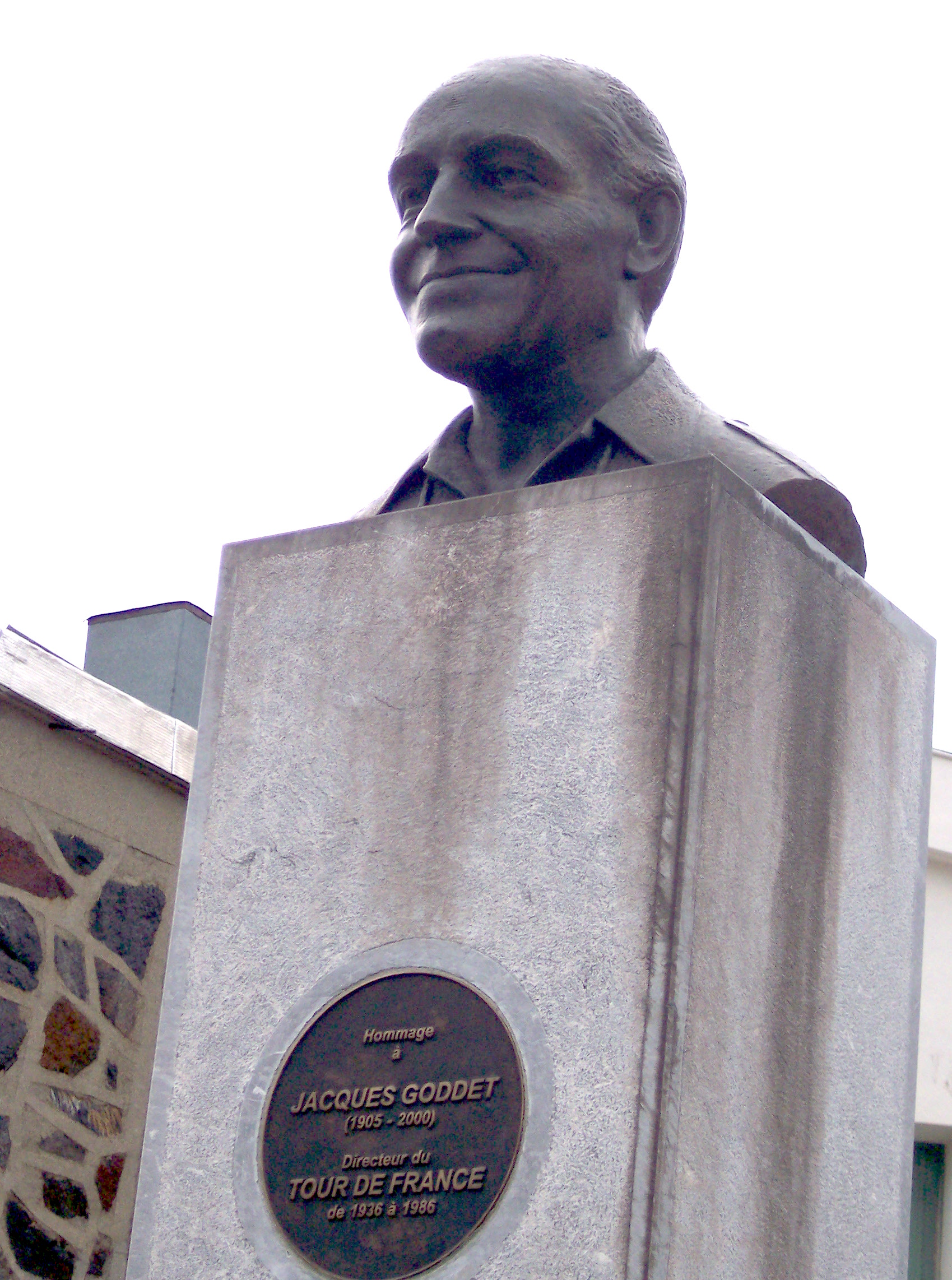
Jacques Goddet memorial at the top of the Tourmalet

The Col du Tourmalet is one of the most famous climbs on the Tour de France. It has been included more than any other pass, starting in 1910, when the Pyrenees were introduced. The first rider over was Octave Lapize, who went on to win the general classification in Paris. In 1913, Eugène Christophe broke his fork on the Tourmalet and repaired it himself at a forge in Sainte-Marie-de-Campan.

Up to 2020, the Tour has visited the Col du Tourmalet a total of 87 times. The total includes three stage finishes at the summit and three at La Mongie. Since 1980 it has been ranked hors catégorie, or exceptional. The Vuelta a España has also crossed the pass several times.

The 2010 edition of the Tour included the pass on two consecutive stages, crossing westward on the 16th stage to Pau and eastward on the 17th stage with a finish at the summit.

At the col is a memorial to Jacques Goddet, director of the Tour de France from 1936 to 1987, and a large statue of Octave Lapize gasping for air as he struggles to make the climb. The Souvenir Jacques Goddet prize is awarded for the first rider to cross the Col du Tourmalet summit.

In 2023, the climb was featured in the Tour de France Femmes for the first time, as the queen stage of the race.

=== Origins in the Tour ===
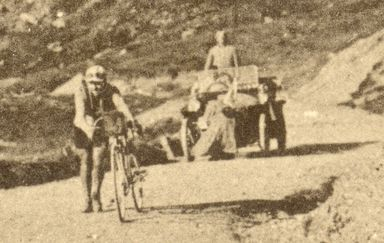
The Col du Tourmalet being climbed in the 1910 Tour de France

The Pyrenees were included in the Tour de France at the insistence of Alphonse Steinès, a colleague of the organiser, Henri Desgrange. He told the story in a book published soon after the event.

Steinès first agreed that the Tour would pay 2,000 francs to clear the Col d'Aubisque, then came back to investigate the Tourmalet. He started at Sainte-Marie-de-Campan with sausage, ham and cheese at the inn opposite the church and arranged to hire a driver called Dupont from Bagnères-de-Bigorre. Dupont and Steinès made it the first 16 km, after which their car came to a stop. Dupont and Steinès started to walk but Dupont turned back after 600m, shouting: "The bears come over from Spain when it snows". Steinès set off. He mistook voices in the darkness for thieves. They were youngsters guarding sheep with their dog. Steinès called to one.

"Son, do you know the Tourmalet well? Could you guide me? I'll give you a gold coin. When we get to the other top, I'll give you another one"

The boy joined him but then turned back.

Steinès rested on a rock. He considered sitting it out until dawn, then realised he'd freeze. He slipped on the icy road, then fell into a stream. He climbed back to the road and again fell in the snow. Exhausted and stumbling, he heard another voice.

"Tell me who goes there or I'll shoot".

"I'm a lost traveller. I've just come across the Tourmalet".

"Oh, it's you, Monsieur Steinès! We were expecting you! We got a phone call at Ste-Marie-de-Campan. Everybody's at Barèges. It's coming on for three o'clock. There are search teams of guides out looking for you".

The organising newspaper, L'Auto, had a correspondent at Barèges, a man called Lanne-Camy. He took him for a bath and provided new clothes.

Steines sent a telegram to Desgrange: "Crossed Tourmalet stop. Very good road stop. Perfectly feasible".

=== Tour de France stage finishes ===
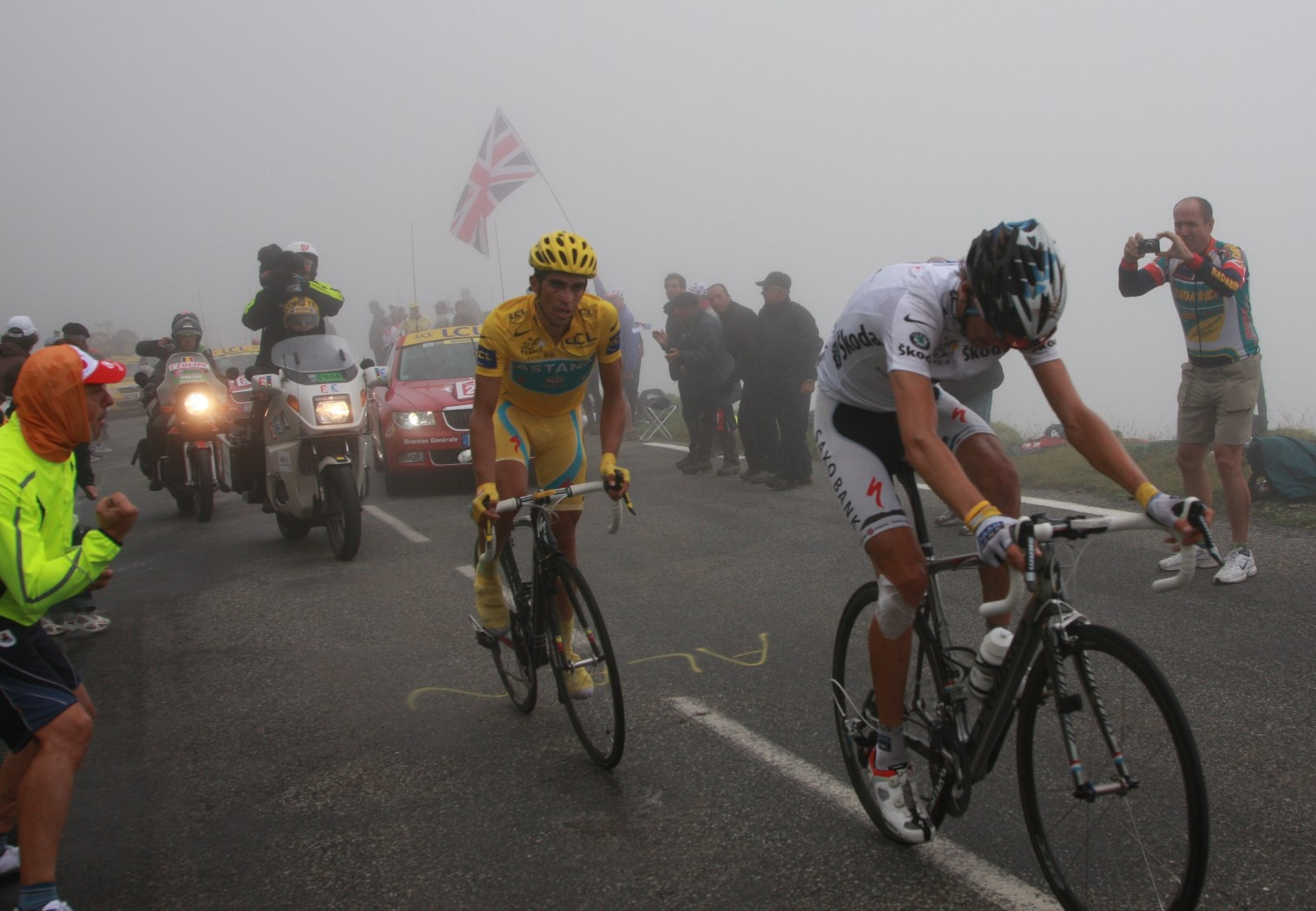
Alberto Contador (left) and Andy Schleck (right) on the Col du Tourmalet during the 2010 Tour de France

Year	Stage	Start of stage	Distance (km)	Category	Stage winner	Leader in general classification
1974	17	Saint-Lary-Soulan	119	1	Jean-Pierre Danguillaume (FRA)	Eddy Merckx (BEL)
2010	17	Pau	174	HC	Andy Schleck (LUX)	~~Alberto Contador (ESP)~~
2019	14	Tarbes	117.5	HC	Thibaut Pinot (FRA)	Julian Alaphilippe (FRA)

=== Other appearances in Tour de France ===
Year	Stage	Category	Start	Finish	Leader at the summit
1910	10		Bagnères-de-Luchon	Bayonne	Octave Lapize (FRA)
1911	10		Bagnères-de-Luchon	Bayonne	Paul Duboc (FRA)
1912	10		Bagnères-de-Luchon	Bayonne	Odile Defraye (BEL)
1913	6		Bayonne	Bagnères-de-Luchon	Philippe Thys (BEL)
1914	6		Bayonne	Bagnères-de-Luchon	Firmin Lambot (BEL)
1919	6		Bayonne	Bagnères-de-Luchon	Honore Barthelemy (FRA)
1920	6		Bayonne	Bagnères-de-Luchon	Firmin Lambot (BEL)
1921	6		Bayonne	Bagnères-de-Luchon	Hector Heusghem (BEL)
1923	6		Bayonne	Bagnères-de-Luchon	Robert Jacquinot (FRA)
1924	6		Bayonne	Bagnères-de-Luchon	Ottavio Bottecchia (ITA)
1925	8		Bayonne	Bagnères-de-Luchon	Omer Huyse (BEL)
1926	10		Bayonne	Bagnères-de-Luchon	Odiel Taillieu (BEL)
1927	11		Bayonne	Bagnères-de-Luchon	Nicolas Frantz (LUX)
1928	9		Hendaye	Bagnères-de-Luchon	Camille Van de Casteele (BEL)
1929	9		Bayonne	Bagnères-de-Luchon	Victor Fontan (FRA)
1930	9		Pau	Bagnères-de-Luchon	Benoît Fauré (FRA)
1931	9		Pau	Bagnères-de-Luchon	Jef Demuysere (BEL)
1932	5		Pau	Bagnères-de-Luchon	Benoît Fauré (FRA)
1933	18		Tarbes	Pau	Vicente Trueba (ESP)
1934	15		Tarbes	Pau	René Vietto (FRA)
1935	15		Perpignan	Bagnères-de-Luchon	Sylvère Maes (BEL)
1936	16		Bagnères-de-Luchon	Pau	Sylvère Maes (BEL)
1937	15		Bagnères-de-Luchon	Pau	Julián Berrendero (ESP)
1938	8		Pau	Bagnères-de-Luchon	Gino Bartali (ITA)
1939	9		Pau	Toulouse	Edward Vissers (BEL)
1947	15	1	Bagnères-de-Luchon	Pau	Jean Robic (FRA)
1948	8	1	Lourdes	Toulouse	Jean Robic (FRA)
1949	11	1	Pau	Bagnères-de-Luchon	Fausto Coppi (ITA)
1950	11	1	Pau	Saint-Gaudens	Kléber Piot (FRA)
1951	14	1	Tarbes	Bagnères-de-Luchon	Jean Diederich (LUX)
1952	18	1	Bagnères-de-Luchon	Pau	Fausto Coppi (ITA)
1953	11	1	Cauterets	Bagnères-de-Luchon	Jean Robic (FRA)
1954	12	1	Pau	Bagnères-de-Luchon	Federico Bahamontes (ESP)
1955	18	1	Saint-Gaudens	Pau	Miguel Poblet (ESP)
1957	18	1	Saint-Gaudens	Pau	José Manuel Ribeiro da Silva (POR)
1959	10	1	Bayonne	Bagnères-de-Bigorre	Armand Desmet (BEL)
1960	11	1	Pau	Bagnères-de-Luchon	Kurt Gimmi (SUI)
1961	17	1	Bagnères-de-Luchon	Pau	Marcel Queheille (FRA)
1962	17	1	Pau	Saint-Gaudens	Federico Bahamontes (ESP)
1963	10	1	Pau	Bagnères-de-Bigorre	Raymond Poulidor (FRA); Bahamontes (ESP)
1964	16	1	Bagnères-de-Luchon	Pau	Julio Jiménez (ESP); Bahamontes (ESP)
1965	9	1	Dax	Bagnères-de-Bigorre	Julio Jiménez (ESP)
1967	17	1	Bagnères-de-Luchon	Pau	Julio Jiménez (ESP)
1968	8	1	Pau	Saint-Gaudens	Jean-Pierre Ducasse (FRA)
1969	17	1	La Mongie	Mourenx	Eddy Merckx (BEL)
1970	19	1	Bagnères-de-Bigorre	Mourenx	Andrés Gandarias (ESP)
1971	16	1	Bagnères-de-Luchon	Gourette–les-Eaux-Bonnes	Lucien Van Impe (BEL)
1972	8	1	Pau	Bagnères-de-Luchon	Roger Swerts (BEL)
1973	14	1	Bagnères-de-Luchon	Pau	Bernard Thévenet (FRA)
1974	18	1	Bagnères-de-Bigorre	Pau	Gonzalo Aja (ESP)
1975	11	1	Pau	Saint-Lary-Soulan Pla d'Adet	Lucien Van Impe (BEL)
1976	15	1	Saint-Lary-Soulan	Pau	Francisco Galdós (ESP)
1977	2	1	Auch	Pau	Lucien Van Impe (BEL)
1978	11	1	Pau	Saint-Lary-Soulan Pla d'Adet	Michel Pollentier (BEL)
1980	13	HC	Pau	Bagnères-de-Luchon	Raymond Martin (FRA)
1983	10	HC	Pau	Bagnères-de-Luchon	Patrocinio Jimenez (COL)
1985	17	HC	Toulouse	Luz-Ardiden	Pello Ruiz-Cabestany (ESP)
1986	13	HC	Pau	Superbagnères	Dominique Arnaud (FRA)
1988	15	HC	Saint-Girons	Luz-Ardiden	Laudelino Cubino (ESP)
1989	10	HC	Cauterets	Superbagnères	Robert Millar (GBR)
1990	16	HC	Blagnac	Luz-Ardiden	Miguel Martinez-Torres (ESP)
1991	13	HC	Jaca	Val-Louron	Claudio Chiappucci (ITA)
1993	17	HC	Tarbes	Pau	Tony Rominger (SUI)
1994	12	HC	Lourdes	Luz-Ardiden	Richard Virenque (FRA)
1995	15	HC	Saint-Girons	Cauterets–Crêtes du Lys	Richard Virenque (FRA)
1997	9	HC	Pau	Loudenvielle	Javier Pascual-Rodriguez (ESP)
1998	10	HC	Pau	Bagnères-de-Luchon	Alberto Elli (ITA)
1999	16	HC	Lannemezan	Pau	Alberto Elli (ITA)
2001	14	HC	Tarbes	Luz-Ardiden	Sven Montgomery (SUI)
2003	15	HC	Bagnères-de-Bigorre	Luz-Ardiden	Sylvain Chavanel (FRA)
2006	11	HC	Tarbes	Val d'Aran–Pla-de-Beret	David de la Fuente (ESP)
2008	10	HC	Pau	Hautacam	Rémy Di Gregorio (FRA)
2009	9	HC	Saint-Gaudens	Tarbes	~~Franco Pellizotti (ITA)~~
2010	16	HC	Bagnères-de-Luchon	Pau	Christophe Moreau (FRA)
2011	12	HC	Cugnaux	Luz-Ardiden	Jérémy Roy (FRA)
2012	16	HC	Pau	Bagnères-de-Luchon	Thomas Voeckler (FRA)
2014	18	HC	Pau	Hautacam	Blel Kadri (FRA)
2015	11	HC	Pau	Cauterets	Rafał Majka (POL)
2016	8	HC	Pau	Bagnères-de-Luchon	Thibaut Pinot (FRA)
2018	19	HC	Lourdes	Laruns	Julian Alaphilippe (FRA)
2021	18	HC	Pau	Luz Ardiden	Pierre Latour (FRA)
2023	6	HC	Tarbes	Cauterets (Cambasque)	Tobias Halland Johannessen (NOR)
2024	14	HC	Pau	Saint-Lary-Soulan Pla d'Adet	Oier Lazkano (ESP)
2025	14	HC	Pau	Superbagnères	Lenny Martinez (FRA)
2026	6	HC	Pau	Gavarnie-Gèdre	Tadej Pogačar (SLO)

=== Tour de France Femmes ===
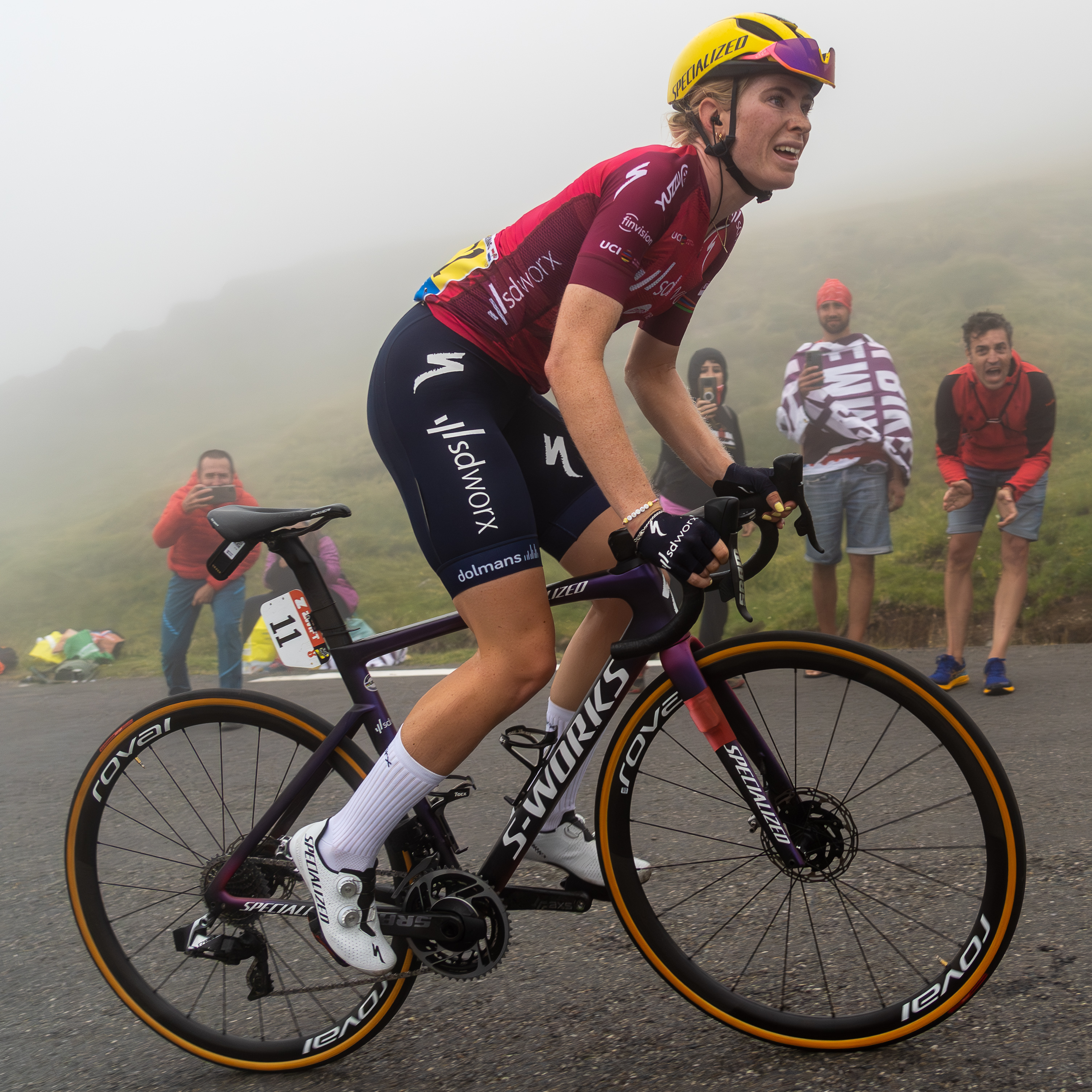
Demi Vollering on the Col du Tourmalet during the 2023 Tour de France Femmes

The Col du Tourmalet featured in the premiere event of Tour de France Femmes in 2023 as the finish of stage 7 on July 29.

Year	Stage	Start of stage	Distance (km)	Category	Stage winner	Yellow jersey
2023	7	Lannemezan	89.9	HC	Demi Vollering (NED)	Demi Vollering (NED)

== Other events ==
The Col du Tourmalet features in other bicycle races, including the Vuelta a España when it has made excursions into France. It is also on the route of cyclosportive competitions. Thousands of amateur riders make the climb every year and many take documents to have rubber-stamped in the shop at the summit to show they have made it.

== See also ==
- Souvenir Henri Desgrange
