= Holm of Grimbister =

Islet in Scotland

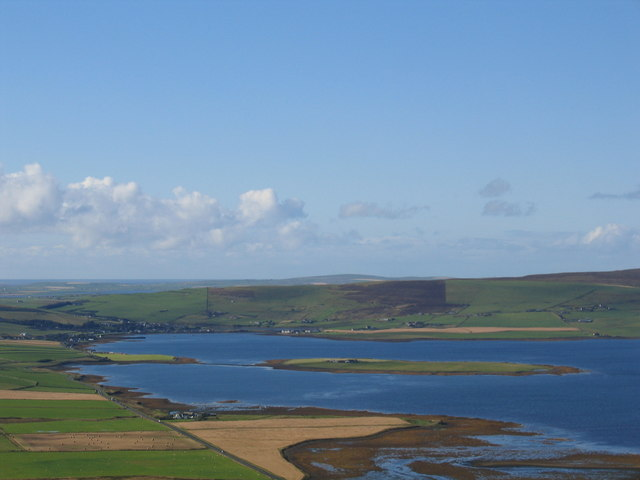
- Holm of Grimbister from the east, with Finstown beyond

Location
- Holm of Grimbister shown within Orkney
- OS grid reference: HY378134
- Coordinates: 59.0036°N 3.0836°W

Name
- Name meaning: Small and rounded islet of Grim's farm

Physical geography
- Island group: Orkney
- Area: 16 hectares (40 acres)
- Highest elevation: 8 m (26 ft)

Administration
- Council area: Orkney Islands Council
- Country: Scotland
- Sovereign state: United Kingdom

Demographics
- Population: 2
- Population rank: 88=
- Largest settlement: Holm of Grimbister farm

Holm of Grimbister is an inhabited tidal islet in the Orkney archipelago of Scotland. Located in the Bay of Firth near Finstown it is connected to Mainland Orkney by a causeway.

== Geography ==
Bay of Firth is an inlet of the Wide Firth that lies to the North. Within the bay and to the north east of the Holm is the companion islet of Damsay. The causeway from Holm of Grimbister connects to the mainland at Holm Point, just north of the mainland settlement of Grimbister. Haswell-Smith (2004) notes that the islet is farmed.

== Habitation ==
Although it is clear that in 2007 the island was inhabited, as it was the residence of a candidate for the Scottish Parliamentary Elections in 2007, it was not listed as such by the Census in 2001. Press reports in March 2010 confirmed that at that time the population of the island was at least two. The 2011 census recorded the population as three, which had decreased to two in 2022. In 2016 the island was reported as being on sale for £300,000.
