= Riva Lehrer =

American painter (born 1958)

- Born: 1958 (age 67–68); Cincinnati, Ohio
- Occupations: Artist and Writer
- Known for: Painting and writing

Riva Lehrer (born in 1958 in Cincinnati, Ohio) is an American painter, writer, teacher, and speaker. Lehrer was born with spina bifida and has undergone numerous surgeries throughout her life. Her work focuses on issues of physical identity and how bodies are viewed by society, especially in explorations of cultural depictions of disability. Lehrer is well known as both an artist and an activist in the field of Disability Culture.

== Early life ==
Lehrer's early education took place at Condon School for Handicapped Children, which was one of the first schools in the United States to offer a standardized education to disabled children. She had many surgeries in her early life. The time she spent in the hospital as a child and her experiences with medicine influenced her career as an educator and an artist.

In 1980, she moved to Chicago, where she lives and continues to exhibit her work.

== Career ==
Lehrer's work focuses on physical identity and disability. After moving to Chicago, she joined a group for artists with disabilities and began a series titled The Circle Stories. Lehrer is the curator for the Access Living Collection of Art and an adjunct professor at the School of the Art Institute of Chicago. Lehrer decided on an art career in order to "prove her interests in biology and medicine," areas of study with few accommodations.

Lehrer's creative work has been supported through a variety of grants and awards. Awards include the 2017 3Arts MacDowell Fellowship for writing, 2015 3Arts Residency Fellowship at the University of Illinois; the 2014 Carnegie Mellon Fellowship at Haverford and Bryn Mawr Colleges; and the 2009 Prairie Fellowship at the Ragdale Foundation. Grants include the 2009 Critical Fierceness Grant, the 2008 3Arts Foundation Grant, and the 2006 Wynn Newhouse Award for Excellence, (NYC), as well as grants from the Illinois Arts Council, the University of Illinois, and the National Endowment for the Arts.

=== Teaching experience ===
Lehrer has worked at both the School of the Art Institute of Chicago and Northwestern University.

=== Circle Stories ===
Lehrer began The Circle Stories series in 1997 and continued expanding it through 2004. The Circle Stories is a series of portraits of Lehrer's fellow disabled artists. The title of the series refers to the "circular" method that Lehrer employed in the creative process, "involving extensive interviews with each participant." In her work, she honors the "community of disabled innovators who provide support and context for the work of redefinition of disability in the 21st century".

=== Other series ===
Lehrer's If Body series stems from the fact that people tend to visualize what they are going to look like at an older age and how that image can change over time. The pieces themselves represent her personal ideals about her body and how those ideals have changed over time. "The self-portraits of her If Body series chart this schism between the imaginary "normal" body I imagine I "should" have had, and my relationship to my subjective "actual" body".

The Family series breaks the stereotype and myth that disabled people are loners. It goes on to show that people, disabled or not, form links, connections, and relationships with others. Lehrer explains "The Family drawings are an ongoing document of my own community of belonging. Some are blood relations, others are people who I consider part of my survival. They are a testament to the power that human beings have to transform each others lives".

The Totems and Familiars series are portraits that focus on people's objects of power (totems) and alter egos (familiars,) and how this iconography "helped (her subjects) through troubled times."

=== Golem Girl ===
Lehrer's 2020 book Golem Girl: a memoir, published by Virago, was the first winner of the Barbellion Prize, a literary award for writers who live with illness or disability. It was also a finalist for the 2020 National Book Critics Circle Award for Memoir and Autobiography. In Kirkus Reviews it was described as "An extraordinary memoir suffused with generosity, consistent insight, and striking artwork."

== Exhibits ==
- A.I.R. Gallery
- Aldrich Contemporary Art Museum (Ridgefield, CT)
- Arnot Museum
- Chicago Cultural Center
- DeCordova Museum (Lincoln, MA)
- Elmhurst Museum
- Frye Art Museum (Seattle, WA)
- Herron Gallery at Indiana University
- Lafayette Museum of Art
- Mary and Leigh Block Museum of Art
- Mobile Museum of Art (Mobile, AL)
- Muskegon Museum of Art (MI)
- National Museum of Women in the Arts (Washington, DC)
- Printworks Gallery (Chicago)
- Riverside Arts Center
- Susan Cummis Gallery
- United Nations (NY)
- University of Notre Dame

== Selected publications ==
- Lehrer, Riva (2020). Golem Girl: a memoir. Virago. ISBN 9780349014814.

== Awards, achievements, and recognitions ==
- 2020: Barbellion Prize for Golem Girl
- 2017: Society for Disability Studies Presidential Award
- 2015: 3Arts Residency Fellowship at the University of Illinois
- 2014: Mellon Residency Fellowship at Haverford and Bryn Mawr Colleges
- 2010: The Critical Fierceness Grant
- 2009: Prairie Fellowship at the Ragdale Foundation
- 2008: Three Arts Foundation of Chicago grant for artistic achievement
- 2007: Wynn Newhouse Award, Samuel I. Newhouse Foundation
- 2006: Wynn Newhouse Award for Excellence (an unrestricted grant for $50,000)
- 2001: Carol J. Gill Award for Disability Culture, The Progress Center, Chicago
- 1999: Chicago Artist's Assistance Program Grant, Chicago Department of Cultural Affair
- 1999: Special Assistance Grant, Illinois Arts Council
- 1998: Honorable Mention, Portrait Show, Elmhurst Art Museum
- 1996–97: Arts Midwest/NEA Regional Visual Arts Fellowship Award
- 1993–95: Presidential Merit Scholarship, The School of the Art Institute of Chicago
- 1994: Scholarship, Anderson Ranch, Snowmass CO
- 1993: First Prize, Schoharie National Small Works Show
- 1992: Honorable Mention, Schoharie National Small Works Show
