= Kevin Lang =

American economist

- Born: February 16, 1955 (age 71)
- Education: Oxford University; University of Montreal; Massachusetts Institute of Technology
- Spouse: Shulamit Kahn
- Children: 2
- Scientific career
- Fields: Economics
- Workplaces: University of California, Irvine; Boston University
- Doctoral students: Kasey Buckles
- Website: http://people.bu.edu/lang/

Kevin Lang (born February 16, 1955) is a professor of economics at Boston University. He is also an elected Fellow of the Society of Labor Economists and a research associate of the National Bureau of Economic Research (NBER). He is the author of Poverty and Discrimination and over 100 papers and articles on topics in Labor Economics.

Lang received his BA in philosophy, politics and economics (PPE) from Oxford University, his MSc in economics from the University of Montreal, and his PhD in economics from the Massachusetts Institute of Technology in 1982. He went on to become an assistant professor at the University of California, Irvine, and he spent a year serving as an Olin Foundation Fellow at the NBER. In 1987, he joined the faculty at Boston University, where he served as chair of the economics department from 2005 to 2009. His recent research has focused on the economics of labor markets and education, including topics such as discrimination, unemployment, the relation between education and earnings, and the relation between housing prices, taxes and local services.

Lang lives with his wife, Shulamit Kahn, in Brookline, Massachusetts, where he is also active in local politics. He served as an elected member of the Brookline School Committee from 1999 to 2009.

== Bibliography ==
- Kevin Lang (February 11, 2011). Poverty and Discrimination. Princeton University Press. ISBN 9780691119540.
