= Buckle's Tower =

Stone-built tower in Firth, Orkney

- Buckle's Too'er
- Location within Orkney Islands
- 59°00′09″N 3°08′15″W
- Type: Folly
- Location: Firth, Mainland, Orkney, Scotland

History
- Built: 1870s
- Built by: William Buckle

Site notes
- Public access: Yes

Buckle's Tower (locally Buckle's Too'er) is a historic stone-built tower upon the Hill of Heddle in Firth, Orkney. The tower was originally built sometime during the 1870s by a local shepherd boy named William Buckle who watched the sheep on the Hill of Heddle.

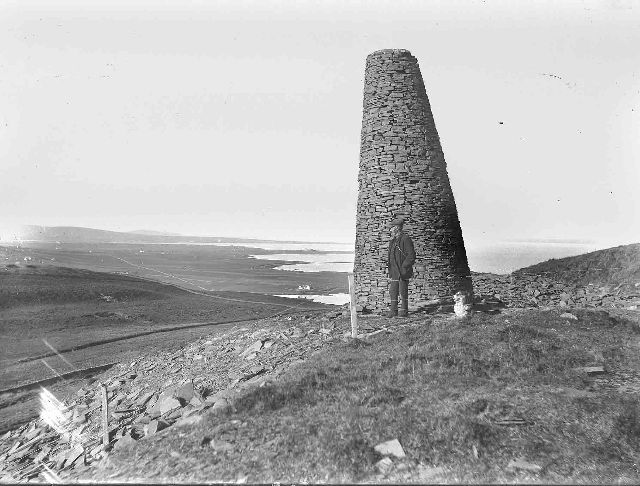
Buckle's Tower in the early 20th century.

== History ==
William Buckle was a boy who lived in the village of Finstown, Orkney during the late 19th century, and around the age of 13 he was employed by the local farmer at Binscarth to watch over livestock on the Hill of Heddle. Watching livestock graze proved to be a tedious occupation for Buckle, and in his spare time he began constructing a stone tower, using drystone from the nearby quarry. Buckle left some stones jutting out of the tower to act as steps he used to climb the tower as it got taller, eventually breaking them off after nearly falling from them. Buckle's Tower in later years was used as a sightline by sailors coming into the Bay of Firth.

Nearby stands Wilson's Tower, a smaller, more recent stone tower closely resembling Buckle's Tower, built by James Wilson of Lavendale to celebrate the new millennium. Wilson began construction of his folly in 1999 and placed the final stone on the tower on 1 January 2000.
