= Barbellion Prize =

Award for ill or disabled writers

- Country: United Kingdom
- Presented by: The Barbellion Prize
- Rewards: £1,000; glass trophy; copy of The Journal of a Disappointed Man
- First award: 2020
- Final award: 2022

Drawing of Barbellion used by the prize

The Barbellion Prize is a British literary award "dedicated to the furtherance of ill and disabled voices in writing". It is awarded annually to a writer, in any genre, who has a chronic illness or is living with a disability. The prize was founded in 2020 by Jake Goldsmith, who has cystic fibrosis and whose memoir Neither Weak nor Obtuse (2022: ISBN 978-1952386398) and collection In Hospital Environments: Essays on Illness and Philosophy (2024: ISBN 978-1952386930) were published by Sagging Meniscus Press. It is named after the pseudonymous W. N. P. Barbellion (1889–1919; real name Bruce Frederick Cummings), the author of The Journal of a Disappointed Man, who had multiple sclerosis and died at the age of 30. In 2023, Goldsmith announced that the prize "will be put on an indefinite hiatus" and the 2023 prize would not be awarded, but that "We may be able to continue in 2024 under better circumstances". As of May 2026 the prize website stated "After our hiatus, The Barbellion Prize will return later this year. More will be announced in September 2025."

The prize is international and is open to new translations into English, and to self-published works, but not to unpublished work. Eligibility is "predicated on the author's presentation of life with a long-term chronic illness or disability ... that may substantially define one's life", and "Authors - such as those in a carer's capacity - who themselves are not disabled may be considered for the prize if their work is truly exceptional as an articulation of life with illness" but they will be given lower priority. The winner receives £1,000, a glass trophy, and a copy of Barbellion's The Journal of a Disappointed Man.

== Winners ==
=== 2020 ===
- Golem Girl: a memoir by the artist Riva Lehrer, who has spina bifida (Virago, ISBN 9780349014814)

=== 2021 ===
- What Willow Says by Lynn Buckle, who is Deaf: a novel about a deaf child and her grandmother and their use of sign language (Époque Press, ISBN 978-1838059286)

=== 2022 ===
- Book of Hours: An Almanac for The Seasons of The Soul by Letty McHugh, who has multiple sclerosis. The book is self-published and available online.
