= La Mongie =

Ski resort in the French Pyrenees

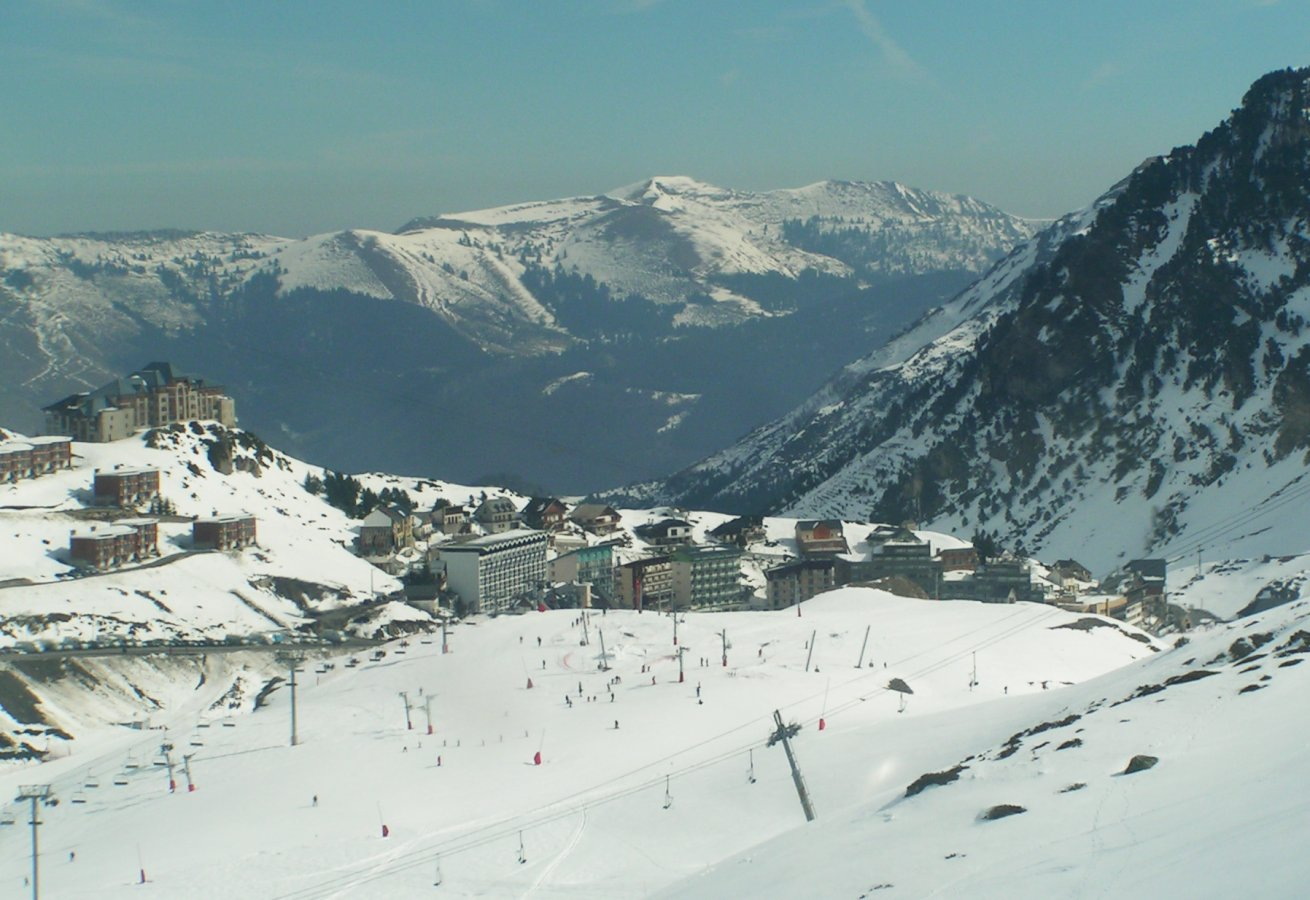
- La Mongie ski resort

- Location within France Location within Occitanie Location within Pyrenees
- Nearest city: Tarbes
- Coordinates: 42°54′36″N 0°10′45″E
- Top elevation: 2,872 m (9,423 ft)
- Base elevation: 1,400 m (4,600 ft)
- Trails: 69
- Lift system: 43 lifts
- Snowmaking: 173 snow cannons
- Night skiing: 1 piste

The village of La Mongie (French pronunciation: [la mɔ̃ʒi]) is at 1,800 m (5,900 ft) altitude. There are also residences at 1850 and the Tourmalet building at 1900. It lies below the Col du Tourmalet 2,115 m (6,939 ft). It is in the canton of Campan in the Midi-Pyrénées region (department 65) of France and around 20 kilometres (12 mi) from the Spanish border. La Mongie is a winter ski resort offering alpine skiing, snowboarding, snowpark, cross-country skiing, snowmobiles and hiking in snowshoes. In the summer cycling (on and off road) and the use of trials motorcycles is popular. The village has two small supermarkets, a tourist information centre, gift shops and many restaurants and ski rental shops. The nearby spa town of Bagnères-de-Bigorre offers large supermarkets and shops, restaurants, a casino, an 18-hole golf course and the natural spa baths themselves.

== Access ==
- Airports: Tarbes/Lourdes airport, 35 kilometres (22 mi). Toulouse Blagnac, 180 kilometres (110 mi).
- Road: A64 exit 14 Tournay, dir Bagneres de Bigorre. Then La Mongie/Col du Tourmalet.
- Rail: SNCF station Tarbes. Bus connection Bagneres/La Mongie.
- The postcode is 65200.

== Skiing ==
La Mongie is the largest skiable domain in the Pyrenees including the Superbarèges station. Over 100 kilometres (62 mi) there are 69 pistes and 43 lifts including poma tows and several four and six-man chair-lifts. A gondola lift gives access to some of the southern pistes while the Pic du Midi Funitel gives access to off-piste areas to the north. Of the 69 pistes, 23 are green, 19 blue, 21 red and 6 black. The domain has 173 snow cannons and there is one night piste.

== Pic du Midi de Bigorre ==
It is also popular for cable car access to the Pic du Midi de Bigorre (2,872 m), on the summit of which is a 19th-century observatory. Work on the observatory started in 1878 and was completed in 1908. Observatory equipment has been in place since 1905 and in 1963 NASA funded the installation of a telescope for photographs of the Moon in preparation for the Apollo missions.

== Tour de France ==
The Tour de France has regularly passed through La Mongie on its passage over the Col du Tourmalet since the inclusion of the Pyrenees in 1910. Three tour stages have terminated in La Mongie village, most recently in 2004.

=== Tour de France stage finishes ===
Year	Stage	Start of stage	Distance (km)	Category	Stage winner	Yellow jersey
2004	12	Castelsarrasin	197.5	1	Ivan Basso (ITA)	Thomas Voeckler (FRA)
2002	11	Pau	158	1	~~Lance Armstrong~~ (USA)	~~Lance Armstrong~~ (USA)
1970	18	Saint-Gaudens	135.5	1	Bernard Thévenet (FRA)	Eddy Merckx (BEL)

== Image gallery ==
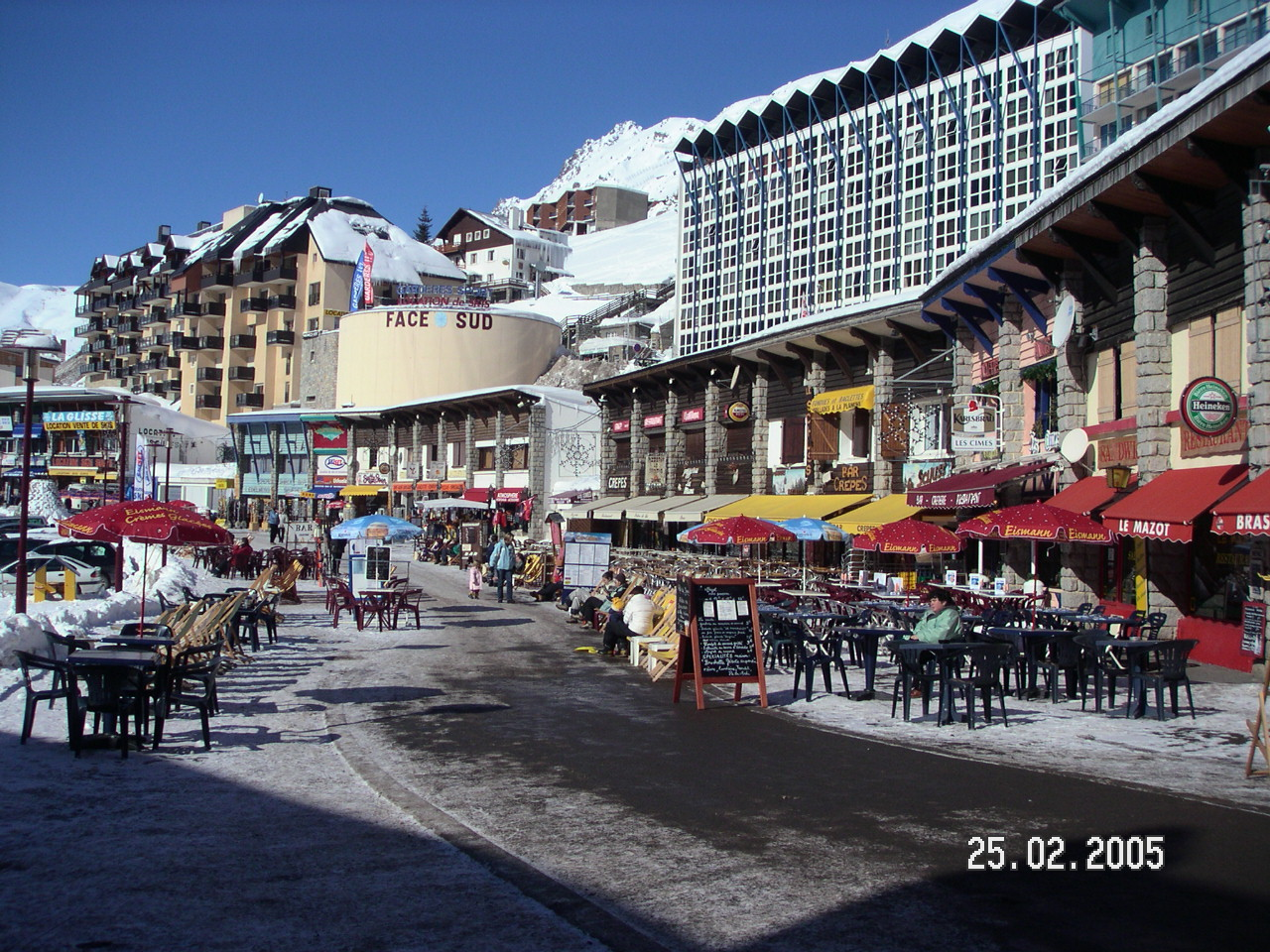
La Mongie village. February 2005.

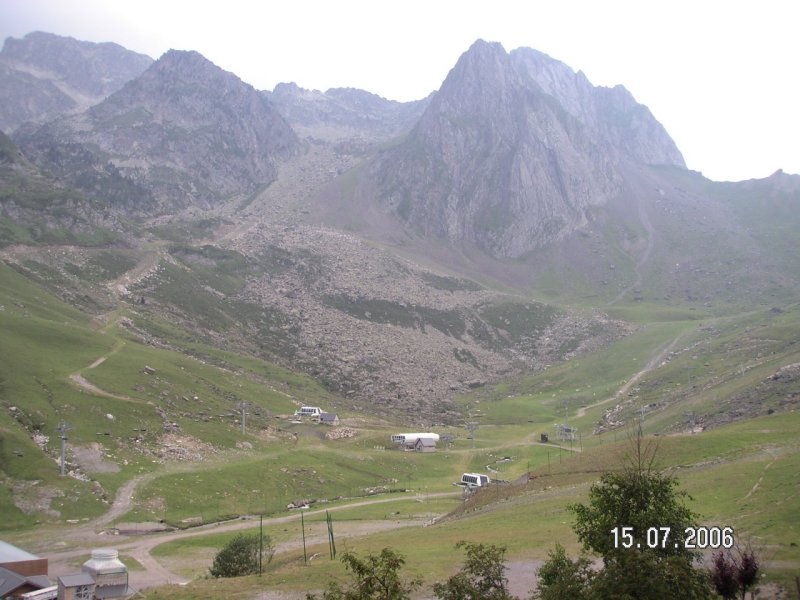
La Mongie ski area in the summer.

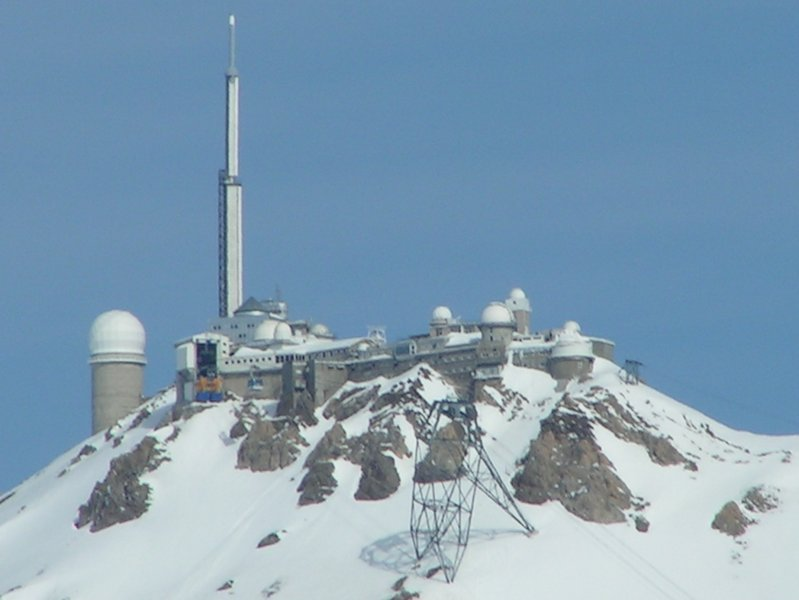
The Pic du Midi.

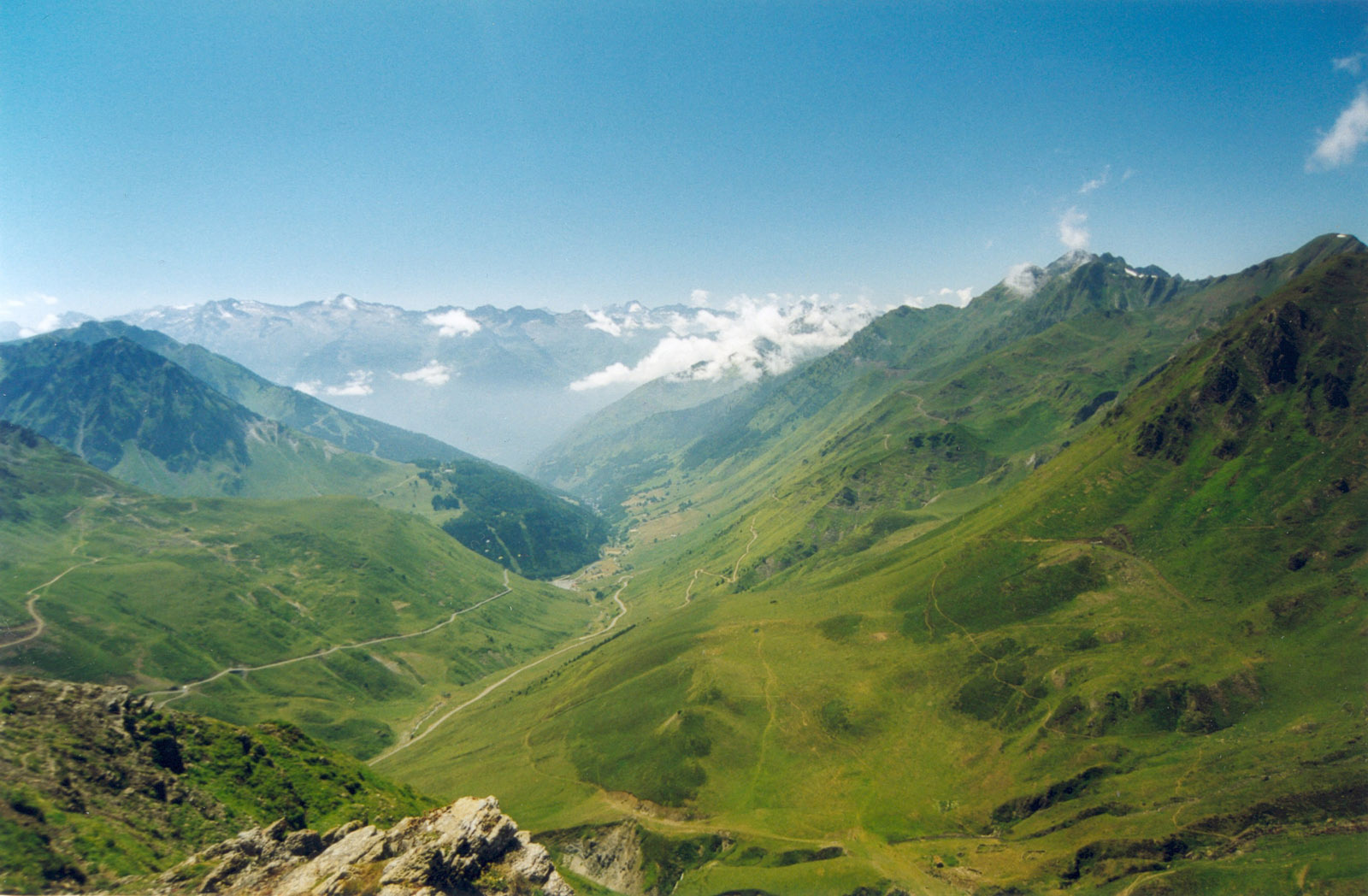
View west from the Col du Tourmalet, towards Bareges.

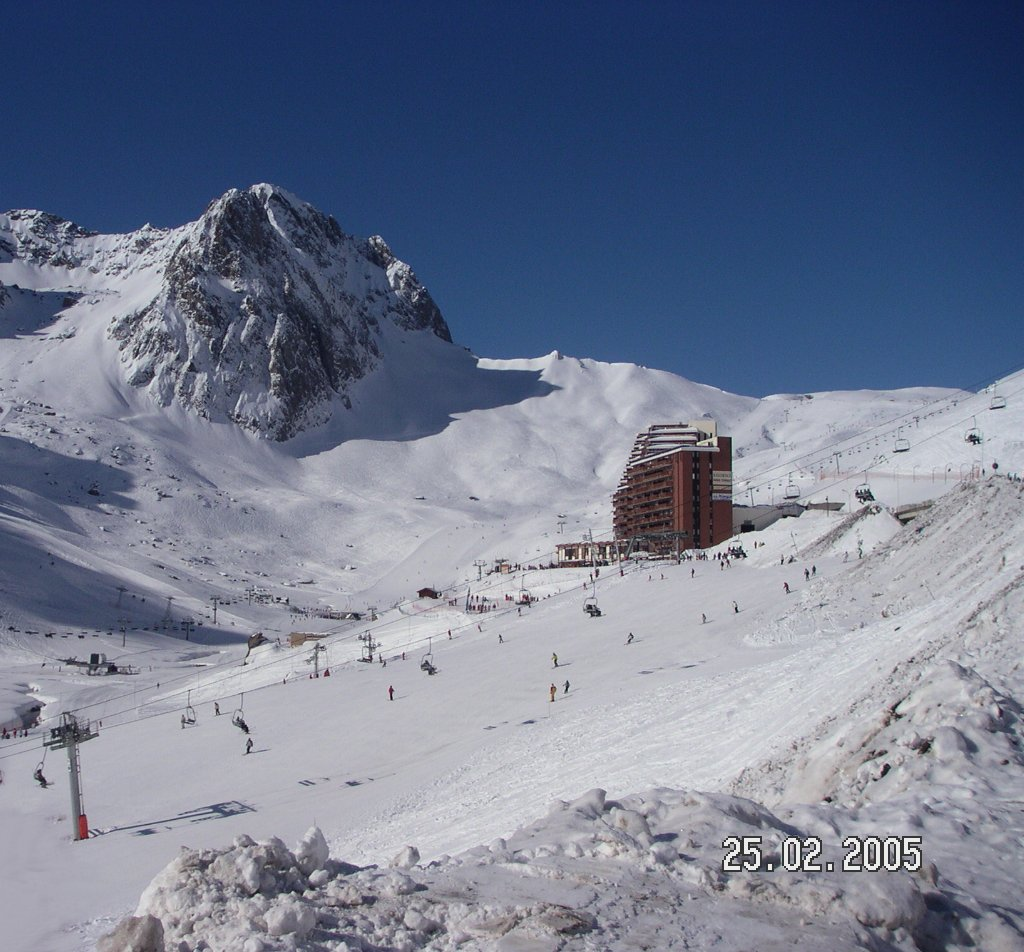
View from La Mongie village towards the Tourmalet building.

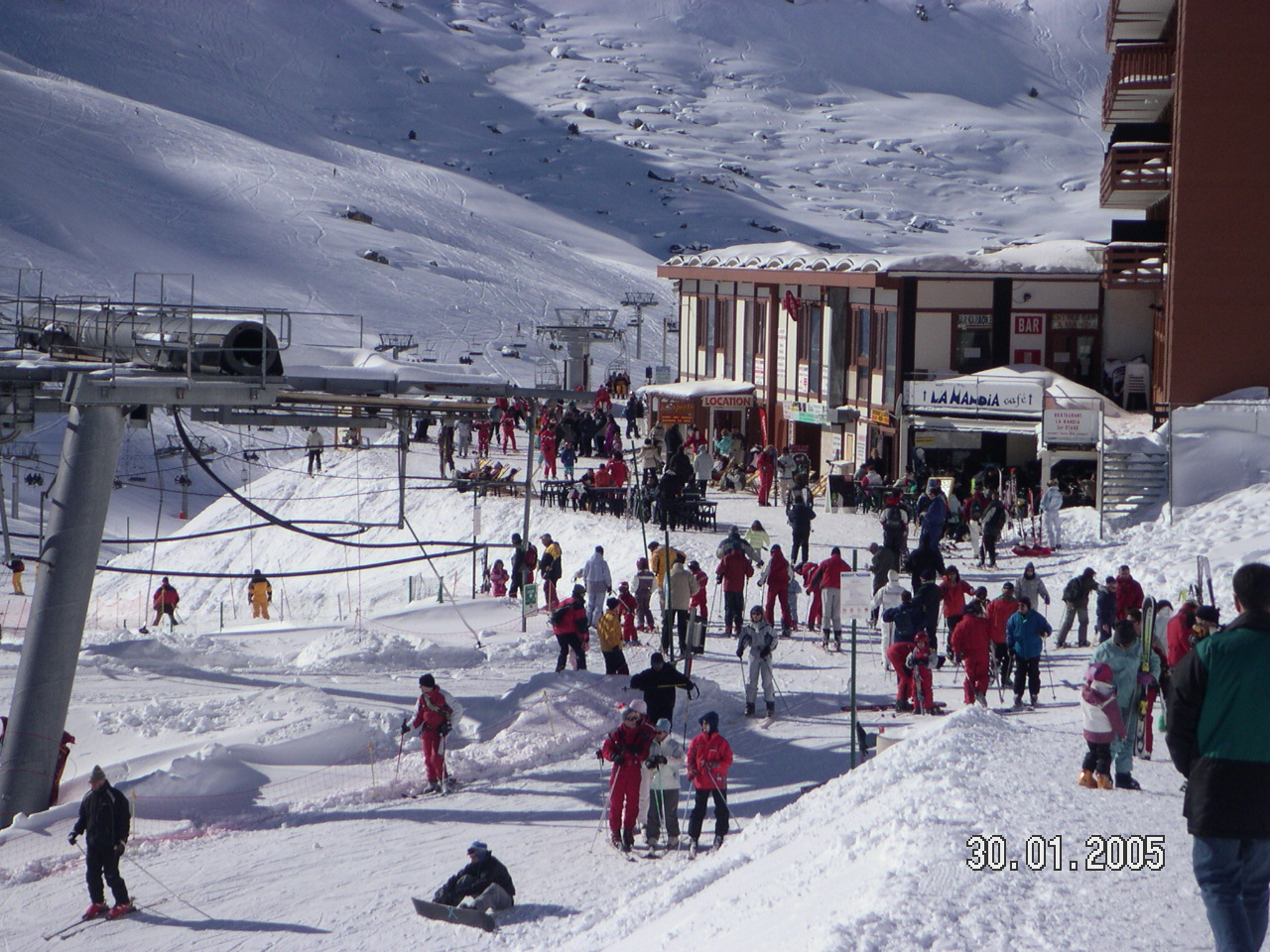
Tourmalet building, Pistes.
