= Kasey Buckles =

American economist

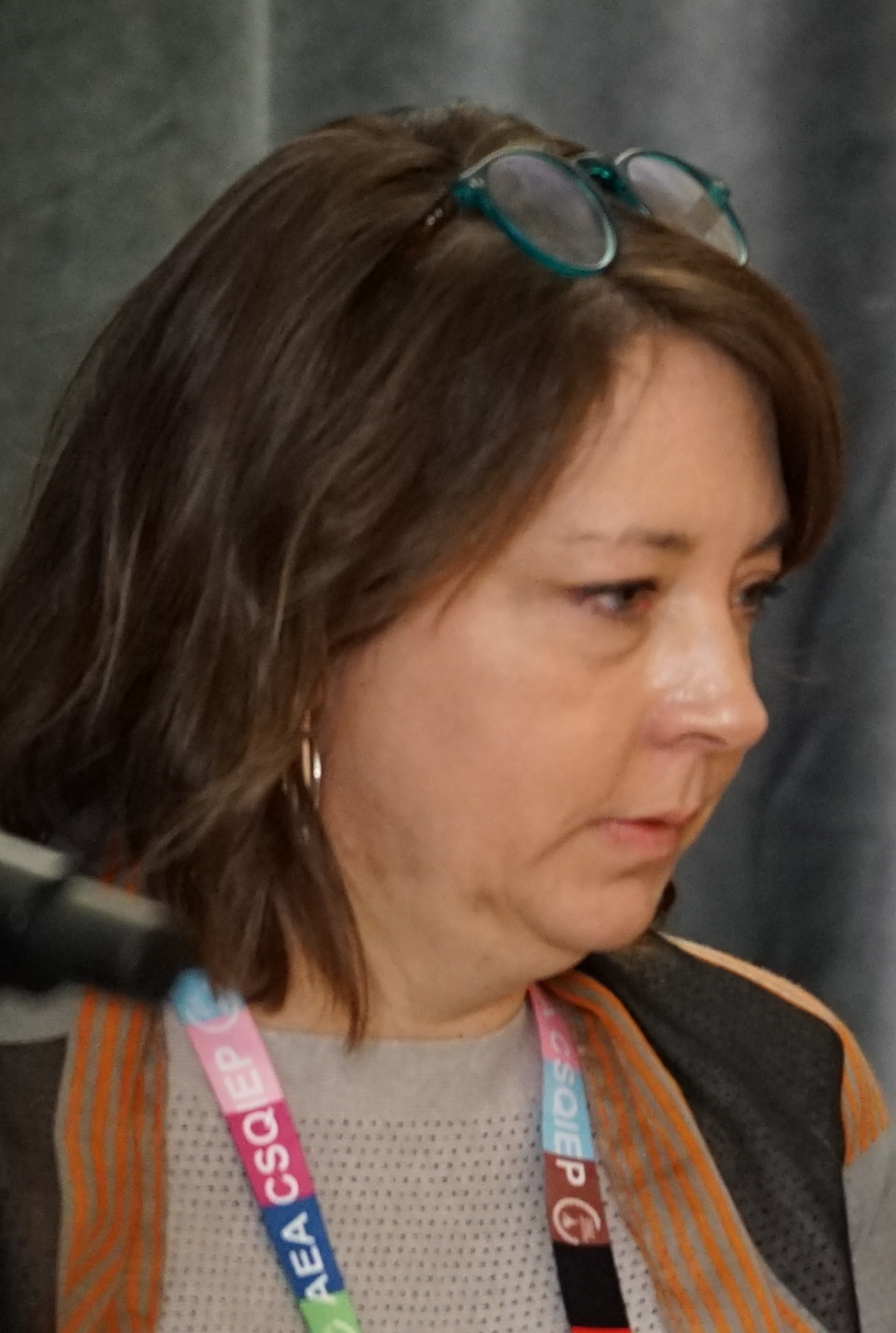
- Buckles at ASSA 2026
- Born: 1978 (age 47–48)
- Education: University of Kentucky; Boston University
- Spouse: Matthew Blazejewski
- Children: 2
- Scientific career
- Fields: Economics
- Workplaces: University of Notre Dame
- Doctoral advisor: Kevin Lang
- Website: Official website

Kasey Buckles (born 1978) is a professor of economics and concurrent professor of gender studies at the University of Notre Dame, Research Associate of the National Bureau of Economic Research, Research Fellow of the Institute for the Study of Labor (IZA), and co-editor of the Journal of Policy Analysis and Management. She is known for her studies of the declining fertility of American women in recent years.

Buckles earned her PhD in economics from Boston University in 2005.

== Research ==
Buckles' research examines the economics of the family, economic demography, and the well-being of children. In work receiving media attention, she has found that children spaced at least two years apart do better on standardized tests, that pregnancies are a leading indicator of economic downturns, that fertility did not recover from the Great Recession as quickly as in previous economic downturns, and that much of the recent decline in fertility in the U.S. can be attributed to a reduction in unintended pregnancies.

=== Selected works ===
- Buckles, Kasey S., and Daniel M. Hungerman. "Season of birth and later outcomes: Old questions, new answers." Review of Economics and Statistics 95, no. 3 (2013): 711–724.
- Baicker, Katherine, Kasey S. Buckles, and Amitabh Chandra. "Geographic variation in the appropriate use of cesarean delivery: do higher usage rates reflect medically inappropriate use of this procedure?." Health Affairs 25, no. Suppl1 (2006): W355-W367.
- Buckles, Kasey S., and Elizabeth L. Munnich. "Birth spacing and sibling outcomes." Journal of Human Resources 47, no. 3 (2012): 613–642.
- Buckles, Kasey. "Understanding the returns to delayed childbearing for working women." American Economic Review 98, no. 2 (2008): 403–07.
- Buckles, Kasey, Daniel Hungerman, and Steven Lugauer. Is Fertility a Leading Economic Indicator?. No. w24355. National Bureau of Economic Research, 2018.
- Buckles, Kasey, Melanie E. Guldi, and Lucie Schmidt. Fertility Trends in the United States, 1980-2017: The Role of Unintended Births. No. w25521. National Bureau of Economic Research, 2019.
