= Buckles, Virginia =

Unincorporated community in Virginia, United States

- Unincorporated community
- Location within Virginia Location within the United States
- Coordinates: 36°48′57″N 82°57′27″W
- Country: United States
- State: Virginia
- County: Lee
- Elevation: 1,877 ft (572 m)
- Time zone: UTC-5 (Eastern (EST))
  - Summer (DST): UTC-4 (EDT)
- GNIS feature ID: 1496498

Buckles was an unincorporated community in Lee County, Virginia, United States.

A post office was established at Buckles in 1922, and closed in 1934.
