= Robert Buckles Barn =

- U.S. National Register of Historic Places
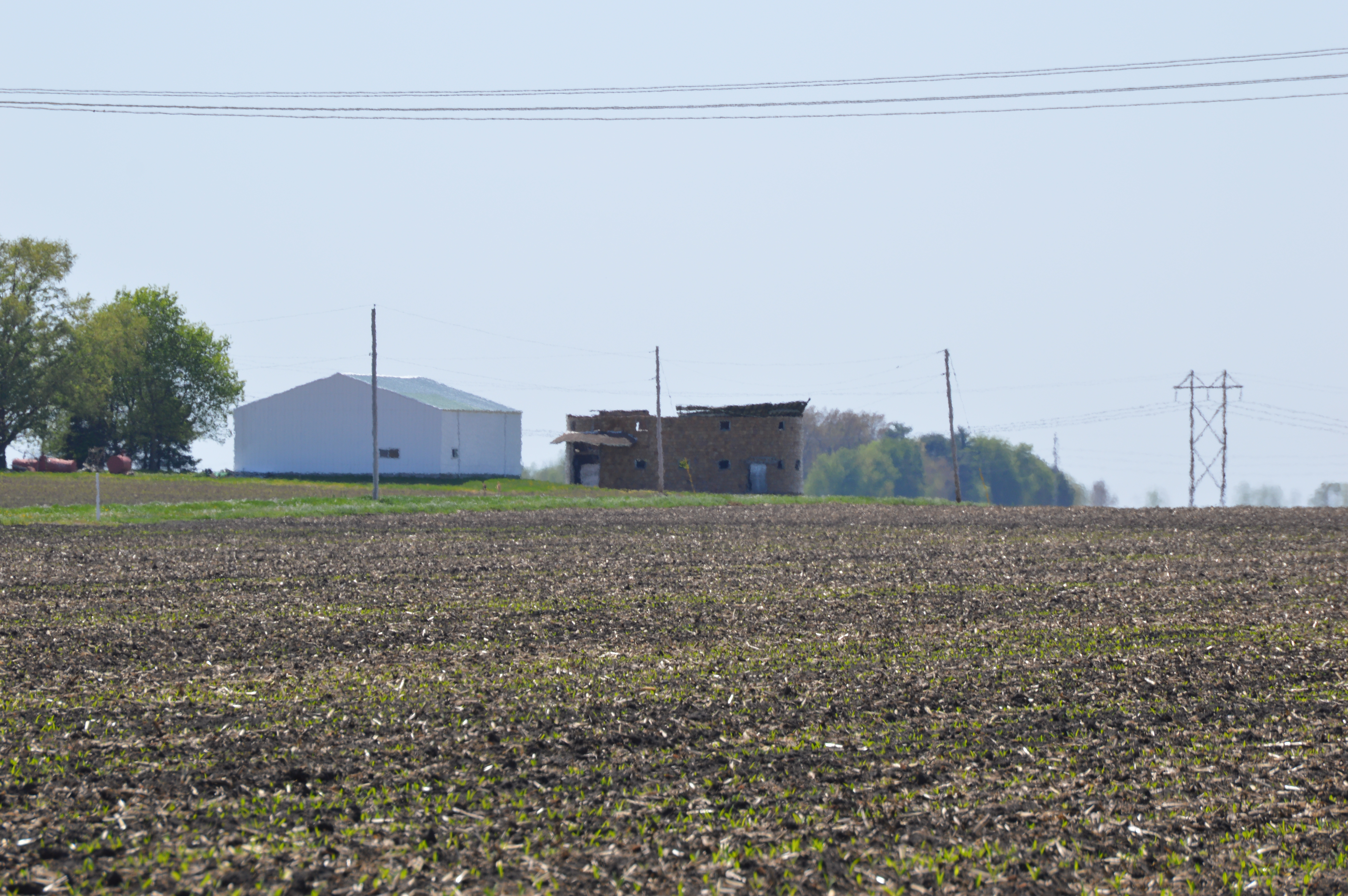
- Distant view from the east

- Location within Illinois Location within the United States
- Nearest city: Mount Pulaski, Illinois
- Coordinates: 39°59′8″N 89°16′25″W
- Area: 0.2 acres (0.081 ha)
- Built: 1917
- MPS: Round Barns in Illinois TR
- NRHP reference No.: 83000326
- Added to NRHP: February 10, 1983

The Robert Buckles Barn is a round barn located 1 mile (1.6 km) southeast of Mount Pulaski, Illinois, United States. The barn was built in 1917 on the Buckles family farm. It is one of the only surviving round barns in central Illinois and one of only two known in the state built with vitrified tile. The tile is specially curved to fit the barn's exterior based on its 30-foot (9.1 m) radius. The barn's design, like that of most Illinois round barns, was inspired by a promotional effort by the University of Illinois' Agricultural Experiment Station which spurred the round barn movement in the state.

The barn was added to the National Register of Historic Places on February 10, 1983.
