= Lynn Buckle =

Irish Deaf writer

- Education: University of Warwick; Camberwell College of Art; Maynooth University
- Occupation: Novelist

Lynn Buckle is an Irish writer. She is deaf, and her second novel, What Willow Says, won the Barbellion Prize for writers living with chronic illness or disability. She is the founder of the Irish Climate Writing Group.

In February 2022 she was interviewed on BBC Radio 4's Front Row.

== Early life ==
Buckle was born in Bristol, England, and studied at the University of Warwick, Camberwell School of Art and NUI Maynooth. She moved to Ireland in around 1990.

== Career ==
Buckle's first published novel was The Groundsmen in 2018. After writing it she offered it to several publishers before it was accepted by époque press, which she describes as "a fairly new UK indie company based in Cheltenham".

Her second novel, What Willow Says, also published by époque, won the 2022 Barbellion Prize for writers who live with chronic illness or a disability. It has been described as "a meditation on nature and deafness."

She lost her hearing gradually and now hears "my versions of sounds, delivered through my technology".

In 2021 she was one of five writers to be virtual writers-in-residence in Norwich, England, during the COVID-19 pandemic, under the banner "Imagining the City". During the project she wrote a short story "Ailbhe's Tale" which "draws inspiration from Norwich and Dublin's shared histories of hidden waterways through the lens of gender, power, and place." and was later published as part of Arachne Press's anthology What Meets the Eye? The Deaf Perspective.

Buckle is increasingly addressing the topic of climate and is the founder of the Climate Writers' Group at the Irish Writers Centre.

== Selected publications ==
- Buckle, Lynn (2018). The Groundsmen. époque Press. ISBN 978-1999896027.
- Buckle, Lynn (2022). What Willow Says. époque Press. ISBN 978-1838059286.
- Buckle, Lynn (2021). "Ailbhe's Tale". In Kelly, Lisa; Stone, Sophie (eds.). What Meets the Eye: a Deaf Perspective. Arachne Press. ISBN 9781913665487.
