= Buckling (disambiguation) =

Buckling is a failure mode characterized by a sudden failure of a structural member subjected to high compressive stresses.

Buckling can also refer to:

- Buckling (fish), a form of smoked herring
- Geometric and material buckling in nuclear reactors
- Yoshimura buckling, mathematical analysis

== See also ==
- Buckle (disambiguation)
- Sun kink of railway rails
