= Baldrick Buckle =

British artist and sculptor

Baldrick Buckle (born 1972) is a British-born artist and sculptor. Officially a resident of the Netherlands, Buckle owns an apartment and studio complex in the Bijlmer district of Amsterdam but has spent almost all of the last decade in America, Australia, Japan and Singapore.

== Work ==
Often socially or politically motivated, Buckle's sculptures and installations capture an ironic view and disillusionment with hegemonic culture systems and globalisation. By using common objects and images with which to illustrate his point, Buckle's work is deliberately accessible. This has on occasion led to criticisms of one-dimensionality and populism.

Buckle's shows include Bread & Work! (Oude Kerk, Amsterdam, January 2007) and Pieces (Europlaza, Pakhuis De Zwijger, Amsterdam, May 2007) both of which were covered by the Dutch national newspapers NRC Handelsblad and De Telegraaf. A version of Pieces that included a car, a caravan, a gin & tonic bar and a market stall was also commissioned and exhibited by the organisers of the Art Car Boot Fair 2007, held in London's Brick Lane. The installation was extensively captured on BBC Collective and was also used as the backdrop to a Richard & Judy television feature on the event.

Buckle was awarded first prize at the Berlage Fund in July 2007. and is one of the only non-RCA graduates to ever exhibit at the RCA Secret exhibition, held in London at the end of each year.

In July 2011 Buckle set off from the northern tip of Scotland to walk the length of mainland Great Britain. The journey was documented via a solar powered smart phone.

After winning the 2016 European sand sculpture championship in Zandvoort aan Zee, Buckle was subsequently crowned world champion in 2018 in the Hague, Netherlands.

== Life ==
Born in Leeds, Yorkshire, Buckle completed a foundation year in art and design at the Jacob Kramer College of Art before spending 9 years travelling across Europe in 'Bertha', a 7.5 ton ex British Army truck. Entirely financed through pavement art (large pastel replicas), the manufacture of handicrafts, impromptu and wild performances (often of music) and 'general ingenuity'.

Bertha came to rest in Amsterdam in 1997 where Buckle co-founded the Dutch sand sculpture collective 'Sandaholics Anonymous'. During this period Buckle organized several other collaborations including a successful attempt to 'sell sand to the Arabs', by negotiating a commission from the government of Abu Dhabi to construct the largest sand sculpture ever built in the Middle East (2001) and a year later he worked with the Football Association of Iraq to bust pre-war trade sanctions by remanufacturing and selling the official replica strip of the Iraqi national team as a fund raising and publicity campaign against the planned invasion (2002).

In 2002 Buckle used the proceeds from the sale of his 50% share of Sandaholics Anonymous to fund a return to academia. He graduated from the Gerrit Rietveld Art Academy in July 2007 with a degree in fine art.
