= The Giant of Tourmalet =

Sculpture by Jean-Bernard Métais

Coordinates: 42°54′30″N 0°08′43″E

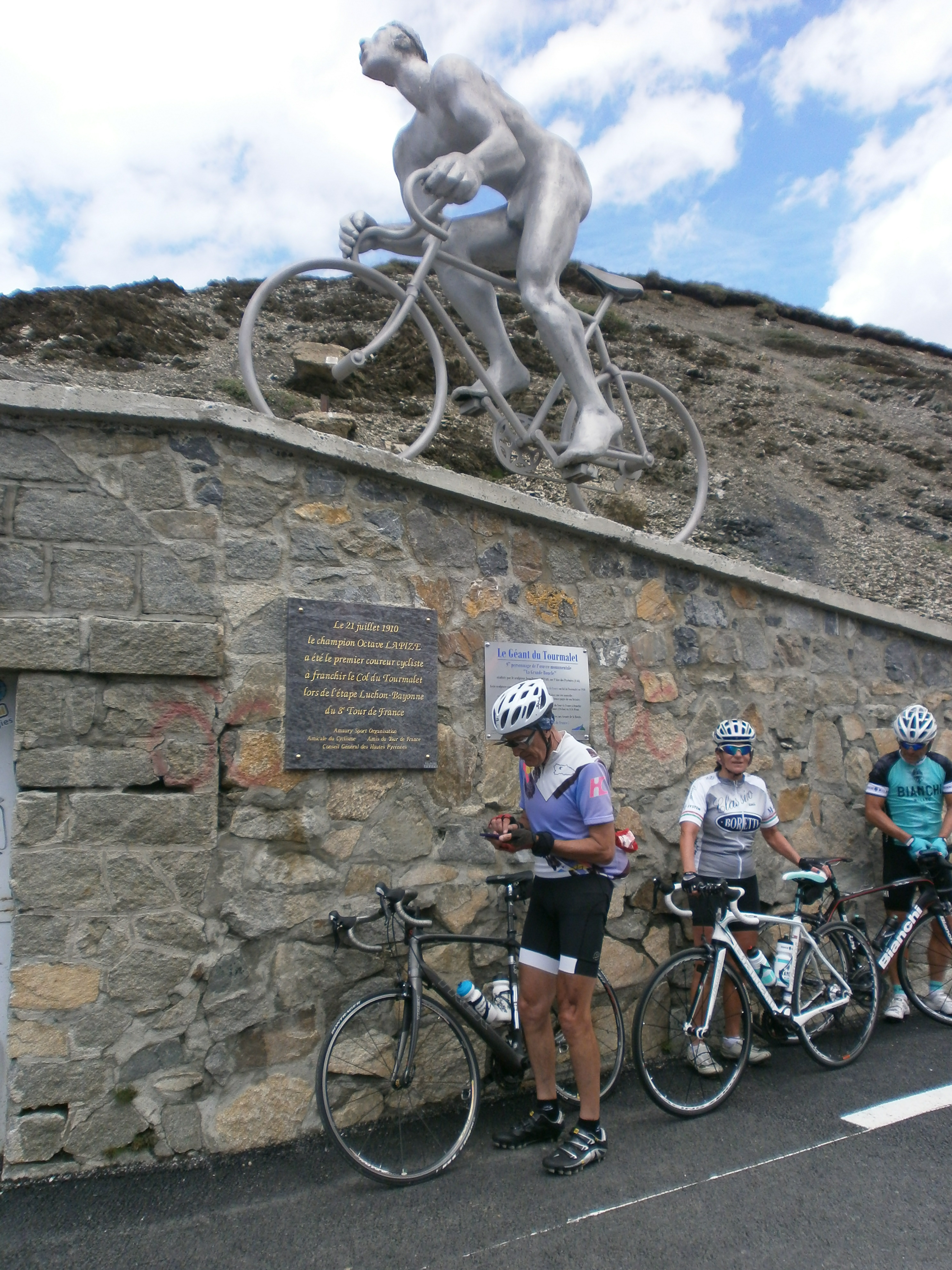
The Giant of Tourmalet, on top of Col du Tourmalet-France

The Giant of Tourmalet (Le Géant du Tourmalet), frequently nicknamed Octave in honor of Octave Lapize, the first rider to cross the Col du Tourmalet in the Tour in 1910, is a monumental sculpture created by Jean-Bernard Métais and installed for part of the year at the Col du Tourmalet in France. It represents a rider "in a dance".

== Description ==
The sculpture was created by French artist Jean-Bernard Métais. It initially formed part of the much larger sculpture La Grande Boucle (the Great Loop). La Grande Boucle was created by Métais in 1995–1996 and is displayed at a rest stop on the French A64 freeway. It depicts the Tour de France in the French Pyrenees. In June 1999, The Giant of Tourmalet was spun off and installed for the first time on the Col du Tourmalet.

The Géant du Tourmalet is made of iron, is 3 m tall, 2.40 m long, and weighs 350 kg.

The sculpture is displayed only in the summer season at the top of the Col du Tourmalet. This mountain pass is located at 2115 meters above sea level and is in the middle of a ski resort in the winter season. Therefore, in winter, to protect it from the weather and to avoid accidents, the sculpture is moved to the village of Gerde, located in the valley near Bagnères-de-Bigorre, where it is displayed. Every first Saturday in June, the Montée du Géant (Ascent of the Giant) folk festival is held, during which the sculpture is driven back up to the top of the pass on an open truck. This truck is accompanied in a sort of procession by over a thousand[6] cyclists. Once at the top of the pass, The Giant of Tourmalet is then ceremoniously mounted in its summer location.
