= Finstown =

Coordinates: 59.007°N 3.116°W

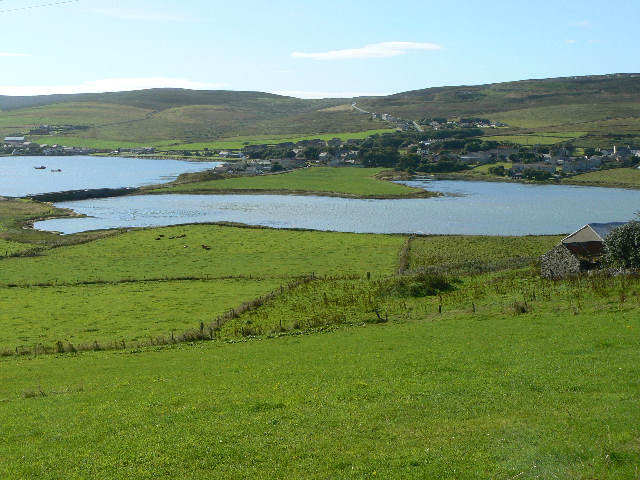
- A view of Finstown from across The Ouse, a tidal inlet

- Location within Orkney
- Population: 500 (2020)
- OS grid reference: HY359138
- Civil parish: Firth
- Council area: Orkney Islands
- Lieutenancy area: Orkney Islands
- Country: Scotland
- Sovereign state: United Kingdom
- Post town: ORKNEY
- Postcode district: KW17
- Dialling code: 01856
- Police: Scotland
- Fire: Scottish
- Ambulance: Scottish
- UK Parliament: Orkney and Shetland
- Scottish Parliament: Orkney

Finstown (locally /ˈfɪnstʊn/) is a village in the parish of Firth on Mainland, Orkney, Scotland. It is the fourth-largest settlement in the Orkney Islands.

According to travel author Eric Linklater, the homes in Finstown are tidy and well cared for. This settlement is situated along the Bay of Firth, whose fringe is a shallow intertidal mudflat. The village is situated at the junction of the A965 and the A966. In 2011 it has a population of 440.

== History ==
Prehistoric finds have been made in the form of ancient cists, somewhat west of the primary school. Further east towards Kirkwall is the Rennibister Earth House, estimated to be 3000 years old.

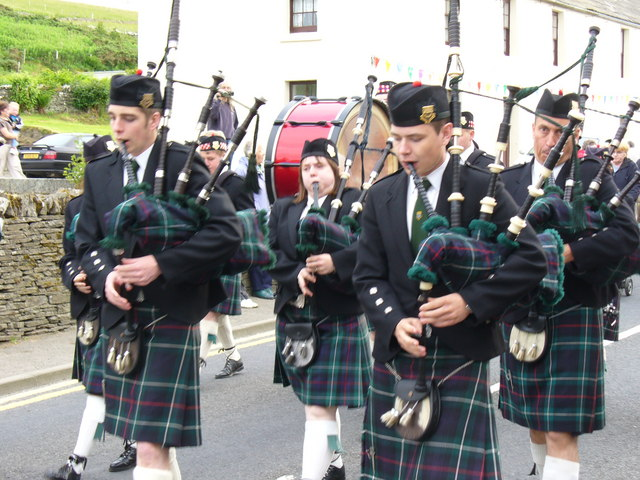
Finstown Gala with pipe band

Formerly called "Toon o' Firth", the origin of the Finstown name is thought to come from an Irishman named David Phin who came to the area in 1811. A soldier with the 9th Royal Veteran Battalion, he married a Kirkwall woman in 1813. In 1820, he opened an ale-house which was called the Toddy Hole by arrangement with John Miller of Millquoy. Four years later they quarrelled and Phin left for Aberdeen, but his name remained. The ale-house building is now the site of the Pomona Inn hostelry, after an old name for Mainland Orkney.

The former Liberal Party leader Jo Grimond is buried in Finstown.

== Community ==
Finstown has a post office, Firth Primary School, a pub called the Pomona Inn, a shop and a garage. Most of these buildings are situated on the main Stromness to Kirkwall road.
