= List of listed buildings in Huntly, Aberdeenshire =

This is a list of listed buildings in the parish of Huntly in Aberdeenshire, Scotland.

== List ==
Name	Location	Date Listed	Grid Ref. (Note: Sometimes known as OSGB36, the grid reference (where provided) is based on the British national grid reference system used by the Ordnance Survey. • "Guide to National Grid". Ordnance Survey. • "Get-a-map". Ordnance Survey.)	Geo-coordinates	Notes	LB Number (Note: Historic Environment Scotland assign a unique alphanumeric identifier to each designated site in Scotland, for listed buildings this always begins with "LB", for example "LB12345".)	Image
7 The Square, Aberdeen Savings Bank				57°26′50″N 2°47′10″W	Category C(S)	34925	Upload Photo
Post Office 15, 16 Square				57°26′52″N 2°47′08″W	Category B	34927	Upload Photo
22, 23 The Square				57°26′53″N 2°47′11″W	Category C(S)	34930	Upload Photo
24 And 30 The Square				57°26′52″N 2°47′11″W	Category B	34931	Upload Photo
20, 22 Castle Street				57°26′55″N 2°47′08″W	Category B	34940	Upload Photo
Balvenie House 3 West Park Street				57°26′57″N 2°47′10″W	Category B	34944	Upload Photo
Scott's Hospital, Gladstone Road				57°26′42″N 2°46′52″W	Category A	34962	Upload Photo
Huntly Castle Hotel, Icehouse				57°27′38″N 2°46′45″W	Category B	9049	Upload Photo
Corse Croft, Loanend, Kinnoir				57°28′39″N 2°44′25″W	Category B	43681	Upload Photo
3 Church Street And 35 Duke Street				57°26′49″N 2°47′05″W	Category B	34900	Upload Photo
25 Church Street				57°26′45″N 2°47′09″W	Category B	34907	Upload Photo
14 Gordon Street				57°26′48″N 2°47′13″W	Category C(S)	34920	Upload Photo
Stathbogie Parish Church Bogie Street				57°26′49″N 2°46′58″W	Category B	34955	Upload Photo
54 Bogie Street				57°26′46″N 2°46′39″W	Category C(S)	34956	Upload Photo
56 Bogie Street				57°26′46″N 2°46′38″W	Category C(S)	34957	Upload Photo
58 Bogie Street				57°26′46″N 2°46′38″W	Category B	34958	Upload Photo
Meadow Burn Bridge Near Huntly Castle				57°27′10″N 2°48′14″W	Category C(S)	9082	Upload Photo
Huntly Castle Hotel. (Huntly Lodge)				57°27′36″N 2°46′49″W	Category B	9083	Upload Photo
7-11 Gordon Street				57°26′50″N 2°47′13″W	Category C(S)	34913	Upload Photo
Stewart's Hall 15, 17 Gordon Street				57°26′49″N 2°47′14″W	Category C(S)	34914	Upload another image
23-25 Gordon Street				57°26′48″N 2°47′15″W	Category B	34916	Upload Photo
59, 61 Gordon Street				57°26′45″N 2°47′19″W	Category B	34917	Upload Photo
19 Castle Street				57°26′56″N 2°47′06″W	Category B	34936	Upload Photo
Huntly War Memorial				57°26′57″N 2°47′05″W	Category B	34942	Upload Photo
St. Margaret's R.C. Church, Westpark Street And Chapel Street				57°26′58″N 2°47′15″W	Category A	34945	Upload Photo
29 Deveron Street				57°26′53″N 2°47′16″W	Category B	34947	Upload Photo
District Sanitary Inspector's Office, 3, 5 Deveron Road				57°26′56″N 2°47′24″W	Category B	34949	Upload Photo
Kirktown Of Kinnoir Graveyard				57°28′36″N 2°45′42″W	Category C(S)	13712	Upload Photo
Graveyard, Dunbennan. (Original S.E. Half Only)				57°27′17″N 2°49′40″W	Category C(S)	9051	Upload Photo
Binn Toll House Huntly				57°26′59″N 2°47′56″W	Category C(S)	9079	Upload Photo
9 Church Street				57°26′47″N 2°47′07″W	Category B	34902	Upload Photo
28 The Square				57°26′52″N 2°47′11″W	Category B	34932	Upload Photo
8-12 Castle Street				57°26′54″N 2°47′09″W	Category B	34937	Upload Photo
1-5 Duke Street				57°26′50″N 2°47′09″W	Category C(S)	34952	Upload Photo
1 And 1A Bogie Street				57°26′48″N 2°46′59″W	Category B	34959	Upload Photo
Christ Church Episcopal Church Provost Street				57°26′46″N 2°47′00″W	Category B	34961	Upload Photo
Granary Building, Richmond Lane And Granary Street				57°26′48″N 2°47′09″W	Category C(S)	34965	Upload Photo
Huntly Lodge Farm, Dovecot				57°27′42″N 2°46′49″W	Category B	9050	Upload Photo
Parish Church Of Huntly Church Street				57°26′46″N 2°47′06″W	Category B	34899	Upload Photo
15, 17 Church Street				57°26′46″N 2°47′08″W	Category B	34904	Upload Photo
19 Church Street				57°26′45″N 2°47′08″W	Category C(S)	34905	Upload Photo
6 Church Street				57°26′48″N 2°47′04″W	Category B	34908	Upload Photo
Duke Of Richmond Statue And Standing Stones Square				57°26′52″N 2°47′10″W	Category B	34922	Upload Photo
The Square Fountain				57°26′51″N 2°47′11″W	Category C(S)	34924	Upload Photo
18, The Square, Huntly Hotel				57°26′53″N 2°47′09″W	Category C(S)	34929	Upload Photo
32 The Square				57°26′51″N 2°47′13″W	Category C(S)	34934	Upload Photo
The Square, Gordon Arms Hotel				57°26′51″N 2°47′13″W	Category C(S)	34935	Upload Photo
32 Old Road				57°26′51″N 2°46′51″W	Category C(S)	34951	Upload Photo
43-45 Duke Street				57°26′49″N 2°47′02″W	Category C(S)	34954	Upload Photo
Huntly Castle				57°27′17″N 2°46′54″W	Category A	9080	Upload Photo
5 Church Street				57°26′49″N 2°47′05″W	Category C(S)	34901	Upload Photo
10 Gordon Street				57°26′48″N 2°47′13″W	Category C(S)	34919	Upload Photo
78-80 Gordon Street				57°26′42″N 2°47′21″W	Category C(S)	34921	Upload Photo
26 The Square				57°26′52″N 2°47′12″W	Category C(S)	34933	Upload Photo
16, 18 Castle Street				57°26′54″N 2°47′08″W	Category C(S)	34939	Upload Photo
30 Castle Street				57°26′56″N 2°47′07″W	Category B	34941	Upload Photo
27 Deveron Street With Pend To 25				57°26′53″N 2°47′16″W	Category C(S)	34946	Upload Photo
7-11 Duke Street				57°26′50″N 2°47′08″W	Category C(S)	34953	Upload Photo
Howglen Gladstone Road				57°26′35″N 2°47′02″W	Category B	34964	Upload Photo
23 Church Street				57°26′44″N 2°47′09″W	Category C(S)	34906	Upload Photo
10 Church Street				57°26′44″N 2°47′08″W	Category C(S)	34910	Upload Photo
Clydesdale Bank 2 Square And Gordon Street				57°26′50″N 2°47′11″W	Category B	34923	Upload Photo
8, 9 Square				57°26′51″N 2°47′09″W	Category C(S)	34926	Upload Photo
Brander Library, 17 Square				57°26′52″N 2°47′08″W	Category B	34928	Upload Photo
Gordon's Schools Original Building Only				57°27′02″N 2°47′00″W	Category A	34943	Upload Photo
31 Deveron Street				57°26′53″N 2°47′17″W	Category C(S)	34948	Upload Photo
Strathbogie Manse Deveron Road				57°26′56″N 2°47′26″W	Category B	34950	Upload Photo
Burnfield Farmhouse				57°31′01″N 2°45′39″W	Category C(S)	9053	Upload Photo
11, 13 Church Street				57°26′46″N 2°47′08″W	Category C(S)	34903	Upload Photo
8 Church Street And Johnston And Carmichael's Office				57°26′47″N 2°47′05″W	Category B	34909	Upload Photo
12 Church Street				57°26′44″N 2°47′09″W	Category C(S)	34911	Upload Photo
1 Gordon Street Corner Of Square				57°26′50″N 2°47′12″W	Category B	34912	Upload Photo
Reid And Gordon's 21 Gordon Street And Nelson Street				57°26′49″N 2°47′14″W	Category C(S)	34915	Upload Photo
Bank Of Scotland, 2 Gordon Street				57°26′49″N 2°47′12″W	Category B	34918	Upload Photo
14 Castle Street				57°26′54″N 2°47′08″W	Category C(S)	34938	Upload Photo
The Cottage, Queen Street				57°26′43″N 2°46′41″W	Category B	34960	Upload Photo
The Manse, Princes Street				57°26′45″N 2°47′14″W	Category C(S)	34963	Upload Photo
Avochie Castle				57°30′27″N 2°46′50″W	Category B	9052	Upload Photo
Linnorie (Former Manse Of Huntly) Near Huntly				57°26′20″N 2°47′52″W	Category C(S)	9078	Upload Photo
Castle Bridge Over River Deveron				57°27′20″N 2°46′50″W	Category B	9081	Upload Photo

== Key ==
The scheme for classifying buildings in Scotland is:

- Category A: "buildings of national or international importance, either architectural or historic; or fine, little-altered examples of some particular period, style or building type."
- Category B: "buildings of regional or more than local importance; or major examples of some particular period, style or building type, which may have been altered."
- Category C: "buildings of local importance; lesser examples of any period, style, or building type, as originally constructed or moderately altered; and simple traditional buildings which group well with other listed buildings."

In March 2016 there were 47,288 listed buildings in Scotland. Of these, 8% were Category A, and 50% were Category B, with the remaining 42% being Category C.

== See also ==
- List of listed buildings in Aberdeenshire
