= Clean Pool =

Place in Scotland

Coordinates: 57.4703°N 2.8080°W

Clean Pool was an important boundary marker between the parishes of Huntly and Cairnie, Aberdeenshire, Scotland. It has now been dried up to plant conifer trees.

Archaeological surveys at the site and surrounding area have discovered traces of cairns and other features suggesting a non-domestic use for this part of the landscape.

It is described in the 1865–1871 Ordnance Survey name book as "A large Marshy Pool situated in the Bin wood about 60 chains north of the Farm of Gibston, where (Local Tradition says) a party of Soldiers who had passed it from Some battle, washed themselves in it; hence it has been called the Clean pool, and is well known by that name."
