= List of listed buildings in Glass, Aberdeenshire =

This is a list of listed buildings in the parish of Glass in Aberdeenshire, Scotland.

== List ==
Name	Location	Date Listed	Grid Ref. (Note: Sometimes known as OSGB36, the grid reference (where provided) is based on the British national grid reference system used by the Ordnance Survey. • "Guide to National Grid". Ordnance Survey. • "Get-a-map". Ordnance Survey.)	Geo-coordinates	Notes	LB Number (Note: Historic Environment Scotland assign a unique alphanumeric identifier to each designated site in Scotland, for listed buildings this always begins with "LB", for example "LB12345".)	Image
Old Manse Inn Farm, Farmhouse				57°27′04″N 2°56′39″W	Category B	9142	Upload Photo
Manse Cottages				57°26′48″N 2°56′45″W	Category B	9158	Upload Photo
Aswanley House, Gateway On S. Of House				57°26′38″N 2°55′37″W	Category B	9161	Upload Photo
Bridge Of Parkhaugh Over River Deveron				57°26′05″N 2°57′35″W	Category C(S)	9162	Upload Photo
Glebe House (Former Manse Of Glass)				57°26′46″N 2°56′39″W	Category C(S)	9157	Upload Photo
Aswanley House, Mains Of Aswanley				57°26′39″N 2°55′38″W	Category B	9160	Upload Photo
Blairmore House (Now Blairmore School)				57°26′44″N 2°56′24″W	Category C(S)	9159	Upload Photo
Mill Of Invermarkie				57°26′26″N 2°57′43″W	Category C(S)	13716	Upload Photo
Walla Kirk Graveyard				57°25′19″N 2°57′23″W	Category C(S)	9163	Upload Photo
Parish Church Of Glass				57°26′47″N 2°56′41″W	Category B	13715	Upload Photo
Parish Church Of Glass, Churchyard				57°26′47″N 2°56′40″W	Category C(S)	9156	Upload Photo
Beldorney Castle				57°25′10″N 2°57′47″W	Category A	9164	Upload another image See more images

== Key ==
The scheme for classifying buildings in Scotland is:

- Category A: "buildings of national or international importance, either architectural or historic; or fine, little-altered examples of some particular period, style or building type."
- Category B: "buildings of regional or more than local importance; or major examples of some particular period, style or building type, which may have been altered."
- Category C: "buildings of local importance; lesser examples of any period, style, or building type, as originally constructed or moderately altered; and simple traditional buildings which group well with other listed buildings."

In March 2016 there were 47,288 listed buildings in Scotland. Of these, 8% were Category A, and 50% were Category B, with the remaining 42% being Category C.

== See also ==
- List of listed buildings in Aberdeenshire
