= Essie =

Essie is a given name and nickname/hypocorism usually used as a feminine name.

As a standalone name, Essie can be found in several languages, including Romance, Germanic, and Persian ones. In each case, the name means "star."

As a nickname, it is used as a short form of several names, including Esther, Estelle, Estella, Estrella, Chreistos Chrestus, Celeste, Jessica, Leslie, Lesley, Estefania, Elizabeth, Estabella and Esmeralda.

In the United States, the name reached its greatest popularity in the 1890s, peaking as the 139th most popular name for girls born during that decade.

== People ==
=== Women ===
- Essie Ackland (1896–1975), Australian singer
- Essie Coffey (1940–1998), Australian Muruwari woman, co-founder of the Western Aboriginal Legal Service
- Essie Davis (born 1970), Australian actress
- Essie Garrett (1947–2014), American ultramarathon runner and instructor
- Essie Jain, English indie singer-songwriter
- Essie Jenyns (1864–1920), Australian stage actress
- Essie Kelley (born 1957), American former middle-distance runner
- Essie Pinola Parrish (1902–1979), Native American spiritual leader and basket weaver
- Essie Wick Rowland (1871–1957), American socialite
- Essie Shevill (1908–1989), Australian cricketer
- Essie Summers (1912–1998), New Zealand author
- Essie Mae Washington-Williams (1925–2013), the oldest child of the late United States Senator Strom Thurmond
- Essie Weingarten (born 1949), founder of Essie Cosmetics, Ltd
- Essie Whitman (c. 1887 – 1963), one of the Whitman Sisters black vaudeville stars

=== Men ===
- Essie Hollis (born 1955), American retired basketball player
- Essie Sakhai, Iranian-born British expert on Persian carpets and oriental rugs

== Fictional characters ==
- Essie Harrison, on the British medical drama series Holby City
