= Strathbogie, Scotland =

District and valley of northwest Aberdeenshire in Scotland

Coordinates: 57°23′N 2°49′W

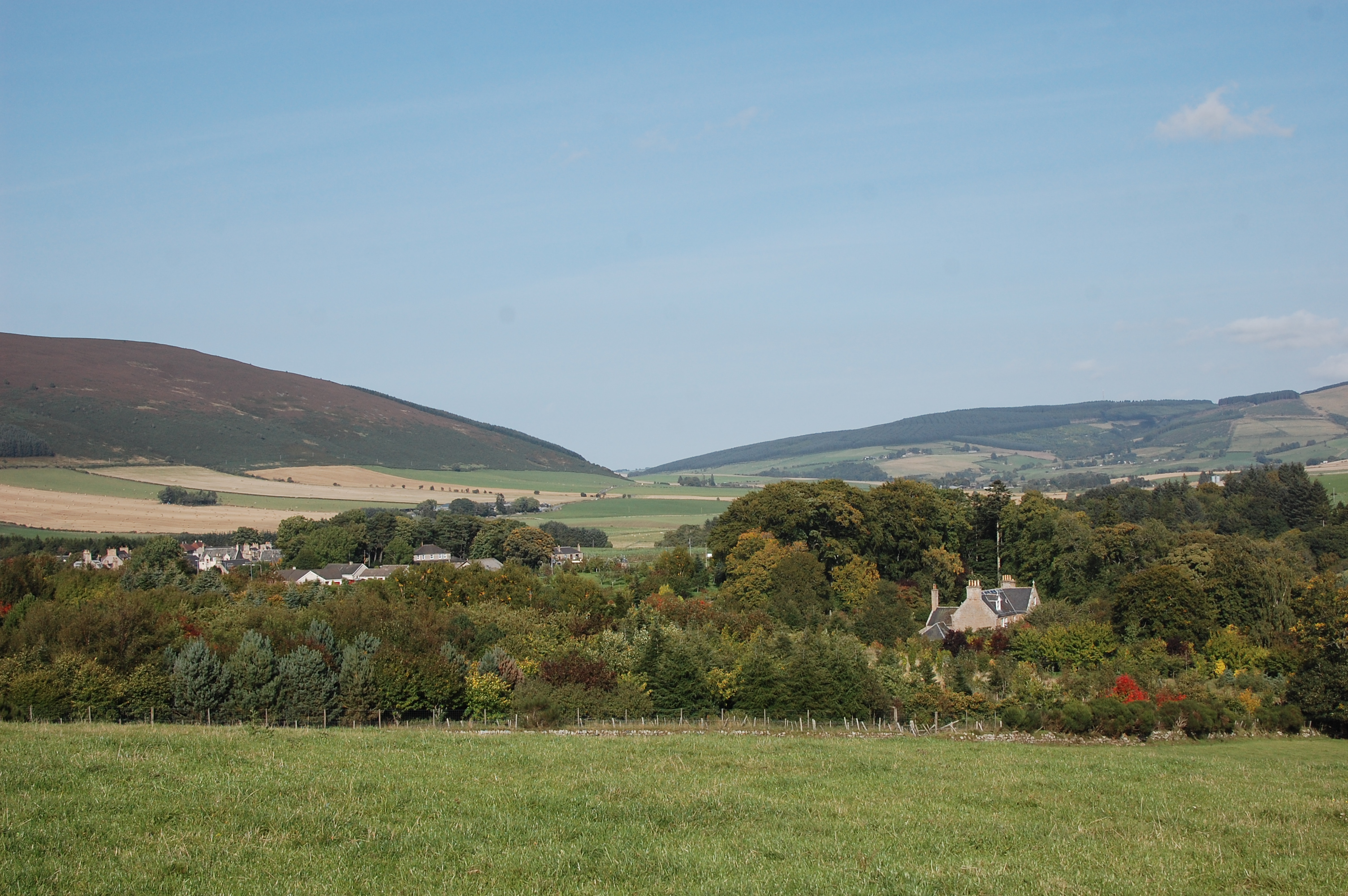
View down the valley from Rhynie

Strathbogie (Scottish Gaelic: Srath Bhalgaidh) is the valley of the River Bogie in Aberdeenshire, Scotland. It was formerly a lordship belonging to the Gordon family, who received it from Robert the Bruce. The Gordons' seat was at Huntly.

== History ==
The name "Strathbogie" is first attested in a version of the Pictish King Lists dated to c. 1124, describing the death of Lulach, son of Macbeth and King of Alba, at Essie in Strathbogie in 1058. Strathbogie was probably granted in the 12th century as a provincial lordship by David I to David of Strathbogie, a younger son of the Earl of Fife, but it is first documented as a defined territory in 1226. The lands listed in this document exactly match those listed as belonging to the lordship in 1600, showing that the lordship had always consisted of the nine parishes of Kinnoir, Essie, Rhynie, Dunbennan, Ruthven, Glass, Drumdelgie, Botary, and Gartly.

In 1839, the General Assembly suspended seven ministers from Strathbogie for proceeding with an induction in Marnoch in defiance of its orders. In 1841, the seven Strathbogie ministers were deposed for acknowledging the superiority of the secular court in spiritual matters. These events culminated in the Disruption of 1843.

== Bibliography ==
- Noble, Gordon; Gondek, Meggen; Campbell, Ewan; Evans, Nicholas; Hamilton, Derek; Taylor, Simon (2019). "A Powerful Place of Pictland: Interdisciplinary Perspectives on a Power Centre of the 4th to 6th Centuries AD". Medieval Archaeology. 63 (1): 56–94. doi:10.1080/00766097.2019.1588529. hdl:2164/14518. S2CID 166643861.
- Ross, Alasdair (2015). Land Assessment and Lordship in Medieval Northern Scotland. Turnhout: Brepols. ISBN 978-2503541334.
