= Slow marathon =

Former annual event

Slow Marathon was an annual event hosted by Deveron Projects that took place in the North East of Scotland with all routes ending in the Aberdeenshire town of Huntly. Originally conceived by Ethiopian artist Mihret Kebede during her art residency program between January and March in 2012 at the Deveron arts (Deveron projects) institute in Huntly, Scotland. The first successful event happened in March 2012 between Addis Ababa and Huntly. The idea of the Slow Marathon was to connect people in different worlds through art regardless of any paperwork and political discrimination that refrain people's mobility and integrity. The slow marathon participants walk at a pace that means they can take time to look at the landscape and consider a topic that is the focus of an associated discussion on the following day. The last person to finish the walk is deemed to be the winner.

== History ==
Ethiopian artist Mihret Kebede created the project as part of a residency with Deveron Arts (now Deveron Projects). The artist had wanted to walk the 5850 miles from Ethiopia to Scotland, but this was not possible because of physical difficulties such as crossing deserts as well as closed borders and visa restrictions. Kebede calculated that if 225 people each walked 26 miles together they would have traveled the distance between Ethiopia and Scotland; in response, Mihret and Scottish artist Norma D. Hunter developed an accumulative marathon, which involved a 26-mile walk in and around the town of Huntly, and a parallel walk-in Addis Ababa, Ethiopia. The inaugural Slow Marathon took place on Saturday 17 March 2012. Kebede led the walk in Huntly, while in Addis Ababa it was led by artist Helen Zeru. Multiple Marathon World Record holder Haile Gebrselassie, participated in the walk in Ethiopia, as well as a shoelace exchange between participants in Scotland and Ethiopia. A discussion, Walk Sans Frontiers, was held on the day after the walk.

== 2013–2020 ==
=== Slow Marathon 2013: Cabrach to Huntly ===
Slow Marathon 2013 took place on Saturday 20 April as part of John Muir Day weekend; it served as the official launch of the Walking Institute. Walkers followed part of an original Hielan' Way crossing unexplored and remote countryside. Starting at the Upper Cabrach area the route went alongside the River Deveron and over the Clashmach hill to Huntly. Winning time for Slow Marathon 2013 was 12 hours and 45 minutes. A symposium entitled "Nature as Home", which commemorated John Muir, was held on the day after the walk. Speakers included Mike Daniels from the John Muir Trust, artists Penny Weir and Gill Russell and ornithologist, Roy Dennis.

=== Slow Marathon 2014: Glenkindie to Huntly ===
Slow Marathon 2014 took place on Saturday 10 May. The route went from Glenkindie past Kildrummy, Lumsden and Rhynie, through the Clashindarroch forest and over the Clashmach hill back to Huntly. It was inspired by the work of Scottish novelist and poet Nan Shepherd. Winning time for Slow Marathon 2013 was again 12 hours and 45 minutes. The walk was followed on 11 May by a Slow Day with the musician Jake Williams.

=== Slow Maraton 2015: Portsoy to Huntly ===
Slow Marathon 2015 took place on Saturday 25 April. It was led by artist Stuart McAdam as part of a project looking at the railway lines cut in north east Scotland following the Beeching Report. The walk took participants along the route of the former railway line from the coastal town of Portsoy to Cairnie junction before following the River Deveron back into Huntly. The winning team took just over 12 hours to complete the walk. The next day a Pathmakers Gathering discussed long-distance walks and other pilgrimages with speakers including John Sparshatt, Christos Galanis, Marylin Lennon and Maureen Ross.

=== Slow Marathon 2016: Along the River Deveron ===
Slow Marathon 2016 took place on Saturday 16 April. The route followed the course of the River Deveron and was inspired by a project led by artist Anne Murray and musician Jake Williams called With and Against the Flow. In 2013 craft artist Anne Murray had walked along the side of the river Deveron from the sea via Turriff and Rothiemay to Huntly. Musician, Jake Williams, had walked in the other direction from the river's source at the watershed between Glenbuchat and the Cabrach to Huntly. The winner of Slow Marathon 2016 took just over 12 hours to complete the walk. On 17 April a Pathmakers Gathering led by broadcaster and film maker, Jasper Winn, discussed the significance of rivers. Other speakers included Richie Miller, George Rutton and Frank Henderson.

=== Slow Marathon 2017: Correen Hills to Huntly ===
Slow Marathon 2017 took place on Saturday 15 April, as part of a project by artist Andrea Geile looking at Energised Landscape. The route, which started in the Coreen Hills, took in places of energy from ancient stone circles to modern electricity pylons and wind turbines. An open discussion on sustainable energy was held on the following day.

=== Slow Marathon 2018: Duffton to Huntly ===
Slow Marathon 2018 took place on 22 April. The route started near Duffton along the river Isla, back to Huntly. As part of a project Walking Without Walls, Slow Marathon 2018 saw a collaboration between artists May Murad from Gaza and Rachel Ashton from Huntly. Inspired by the botanical collections of pacifist Rosa Luxemburg, the artists mapped out their routes by drawing inspiration from the wild plants they find in their respective places. Through the Walking Without Walls partnership Rachel and May found ways to collaborate artistically and socially despite restrictive political situations.

=== Slow Marathon 2019: Route surrounding Huntly ===
The Slow Marathon 2019 took place on 21 April 2019, and walked the local poem 'The Ba'Hill, the Battlehill, the Clashmach and the Bin, they all form a circle and Hunty lies within'. It was a circle of varied terrain – including woodland, farmland, hills, and along the river Deveron – started and finished in Huntly. During 20 April an open discussion took place about walking, poetry and the commons.

=== Slow Marathon 2020: Under One Sky ===
In May 2020 Deveron Projects announced that Slow Marathon could not take place as planned and instead called on people across the globe to come together and walk the world in an act of solidarity with communities suffering from the Covid-19 pandemic. The project is part of Under One Sky with artist Iman Tajik.
