= Coetzer =

Coetzer is a surname. Notable people with the surname include:

- Amanda Coetzer (born 1971), South African tennis player
- Cameron Coetzer (born 1995), South African badminton player
- Gert Coetzer, South African rugby league player
- Jacques Coetzer (born 1968), South African artist
- Kyle Coetzer (born 1984), Scottish cricketer
- Marius Coetzer (born 1984), South African rugby union player
- Pierre Coetzer (born 1961), South African heavyweight boxer
