= Henry Neale =

Henry Neale may refer to:

- John Henry Neale II (1896–1961), American shipping executive
- J. Henry Neale (1905–1989), United States lawyer and banker

== See also ==
- Henry S. Neal (1828–1906), American lawyer and politician
- Henry Neele (1798–1828), English poet and literary scholar
- Harry Neal (disambiguation)
