= List of listed buildings in Cairnie =

This is a list of listed buildings in the parish of Cairnie in Aberdeenshire, Scotland.

== List ==
Name	Location	Date listed	Grid ref. (Note: Sometimes known as OSGB36, the grid reference (where provided) is based on the British national grid reference system used by the Ordnance Survey. • "Guide to National Grid". Ordnance Survey. • "Get-a-map". Ordnance Survey.)	Geo-coordinates	Notes	LB number (Note: Historic Environment Scotland assign a unique alphanumeric identifier to each designated site in Scotland, for listed buildings this always begins with "LB", for example "LB12345".)	Image
Auchanachie Castle, Dovecote				57°30′33″N 2°50′19″W	Category B	47	Upload Photo
Botarg And Pitlurg Aisle, Cairnie Churchyard, Cairnie				57°29′17″N 2°51′09″W	Category C(S)	3013	Upload Photo
Auchanachie Castle				57°30′35″N 2°50′19″W	Category A	3016	Upload Photo
Cairnie Parish Church, Cairnie				57°29′18″N 2°51′09″W	Category C(S)	3012	Upload Photo
Cairnie, Kirkton House And Walled Garden				57°29′18″N 2°51′05″W	Category B	3014	Upload Photo
St. Carol's Church, Ruthven Burial Ground				57°30′35″N 2°49′34″W	Category B	3015	Upload Photo
Mains Of Davidston				57°29′34″N 2°58′12″W	Category B	3017	Upload Photo
Deveron Viaduct				57°30′01″N 2°46′42″W	Category B	3018	Upload Photo

== Key ==
The scheme for classifying buildings in Scotland is:

- Category A: "buildings of national or international importance, either architectural or historic; or fine, little-altered examples of some particular period, style or building type."
- Category B: "buildings of regional or more than local importance; or major examples of some particular period, style or building type, which may have been altered."
- Category C: "buildings of local importance; lesser examples of any period, style, or building type, as originally constructed or moderately altered; and simple traditional buildings which group well with other listed buildings."

In March 2016 there were 47,288 listed buildings in Scotland. Of these, 8% were Category A, and 50% were Category B, with the remaining 42% being Category C.

== See also ==
- List of listed buildings in Aberdeenshire
