= Schrag =

Schrag is a surname. Notable people with the surname include:

- Anthony Schrag (born 1975), Scottish artist and academic
- Ariel Schrag (born 1979), American cartoonist and television writer
- Daniel P. Schrag (born 1966), American geologist and professor
- Karl Schrag (1912–2000), American printmaker and educator
