= George Trapp (disambiguation) =

George Trapp (1948–2002) was an American basketball player

George Trapp may also refer to:

- George Trapp (educator) (1906–1996), Scottish scientist and educator
- George Joseph Trapp (1909–2002), Canadian educator and politician
- George Leonard Trapp (1894–1917), Canadian flying ace during World War I
- Georg von Trapp (1880–1947), Austro-Hungarian Navy officer

== See also ==
- George Rapp, founder of a religious sect
