= Deveron Projects =

Coordinates: 57°26′50″N 2°47′09″W

Deveron Projects, formerly Deveron Arts, is a United Kingdom arts organisation based in Huntly, Aberdeenshire, Scotland that hosts international artists from a variety of disciplines to collaborate with the town community. Deveron Projects follows a '50/50' approach, which gives equal attention to impact on the local community and impact on the international art scene. Residencies have been provided to artists from China, the Americas, India, Africa and mainland Europe as well as North East Scotland.

== History ==
Deveron Projects was established by Claudia Zeiske, Annette Gisselbaek and Jean Longley in 1995. Zeiske remained Deveron Projects long-term director, and in August 2020 announced that she would be stepping down after 25 years. As well as organizing artist residencies, Deveron Projects has created a major collection of contemporary art in the town through their town is the venue methodology, and also carries out annual events, such as the Slow Marathon.

In 2008 Deveron Projects joined forces with the Huntly Development Trust and artist Jacques Coetzer to create a new motto, "Room to Roam", and created a regional initiative 2014, "Aberdeenshire Ways". In 2013 a Creative Place Award from Creative Scotland funded an initiative spearheaded by Deveron Projects: The Walking Institute.

As part of its 20th anniversary year Deveron Projects commissioned a work of public art inspired by Joseph Beuys ' seminal 7000 Oaks. The project, marking the centenary of the beginning of WWI, resulted in the White Wood, a living monument to peace, which will develop over three hundred years. As a site of reflection, it was created by the community of Huntly and artist Caroline Wendling, with oaks from Germany, stones from France and Scottish soil.

== The Town is the Venue artist residencies ==
Deveron Projects arranges residencies which result in the creation of public art based on research into topical issues – economic, social, political – that affect both the local community and the wider world. Drawing inspiration from Sir Patrick Geddes, the Aberdeenshire born father of town planning who viewed society as a bio-diverse, interconnected system, Deveron Projects adopt the Geddes' model PLACE / WORK / FOLK to inform how we look at our home. This model informs DP's future project themes. Deveron Residences have explored the history, context and identity of Huntly with the town acting as studio, gallery and stage for the artists. Most residencies last three months; others have been over a more extended period. About 80 artists from 23 countries have undertaken a Town is the Venue Residency since 1995. They include David Blyth, Clare Qualmann, Baudouin Mouanda, Böller und Brot, Celia - Yunior, Dalziel + Scullion, Emily White, Gayle Chong Kwan, Gemuce - Pompílio Hilário, Hamish Fulton, Jacqueline Donachie, Kenny Hunter, Mihret Kebede, Nancy Mteki, Paul Shepheard, Paul Anderson, Peter Liversidge Priya Ravish Mehra, Roderick Buchanan, Ross Sinclair, Stéfanie Bourne and Utopia Group. Each artist leaves at least one work at the end of their residency, so over time Huntly has amassed a large collection of contemporary art: The Town Collection, which is dispersed about the town.

Funded by the first of two Creative Scotland Creative Place Awards, Deveron Projects invited food consultant Simon Preston to undertake a Town is the Venue residency in 2012. The Town is the Menu residency led to the creation of a signature menu devised to show off the best of the Aberdeenshire larder. In Spring 2017 the Syrian artist Manaf Halbouni, who lives and works in Dresden, worked with recently resettled Syrian refugees from Aberdeenshire during his residency to look at the concept What If?; an alternative history timeline of colonialism in the Middle East focussed on the 1916 Sykes-Picot Agreement which divided the Middle East.

== Room to Roam ==
In 2007 Deveron Projects invited Cape Town-based artist Jacques Coetzer to create a branding for the town. Coetzer discovered the poem “Room to Roam” by Victorian author and Huntly resident, George MacDonald through the Scottish folk-rock band The Waterboys, who released an album of the same name in 1990. Coetzer contacted lead singer Mike Scott of the Waterboys, who agreed to visit Huntly and teach the town the song as its new town anthem. Coetzer's branding was unveiled in 2008, and included a contemporary logo design with a traditional Scottish antler and a road map. The branding was officially accepted as part of the town crest by the Court of the Lord Lyon in 2010.

== The Walking Institute ==
In 2010, Deveron Projects commissioned Hamish Fulton to create a new walking work for Huntly. The resulting piece 21 Days in the Cairngorms (2010) featured two group slow-walks, as well as a group of walkers to see Fulton off on the first day of his twenty-day journey, and new and unusual experience for Fulton. This project inspired the development of the Walking Institute and a further focus on walking as an artistic medium. In 2012 Ethiopian artist Mihret Kebede developed Slow Marathon, an artistic project in response to her inability to walk from her hometown of Addis Ababa to Huntly. The project consisted of an accumulative marathon that included miles donated remotely by international participants, as well as two twenty-six mile walks in Huntly and Addis Ababa. Ultimately, over five-hundred individuals participated in the project and donated 14172.4 miles, a total of 540 marathons. The project has since become an annual event, created in conjunction with artists working with Devon Projects The 2013 Slow Marathon, Cabrach to Huntly, was held on John Muir Day and served as the official launch of the institute. The 2014 event started at the Glenkindie on the edge of the Cairngorms National Park. Other Walking Institute projects have included: In the Footsteps of Nan Shepherd: a long-distance walk by Simone Kenyon looking at issues, plights and pleasures of women walking in wilderness; Huntly Perambulator, a series of walks by Clare Qualmann looking at walking with prams; Hielan’ Ways, a programme that included poetry (Alec Finlay), music (Paul Anderson) and art (Simone Kenyon, Gillian Russel). Hielan’ Ways explored the old drover routes that cross north-east Scotland and culminated in a symposium with contributions from mountaineer Doug Scott, Turner Prize-winning artist Richard Long and the Cloud Appreciation Society. In 2015 Anthony Schrag completed The Lure of the Lost: A Contemporary Pilgrimage, a 2500 km walk from Huntly to the Venice Biennale in Italy.
