= The Gordon Schools =

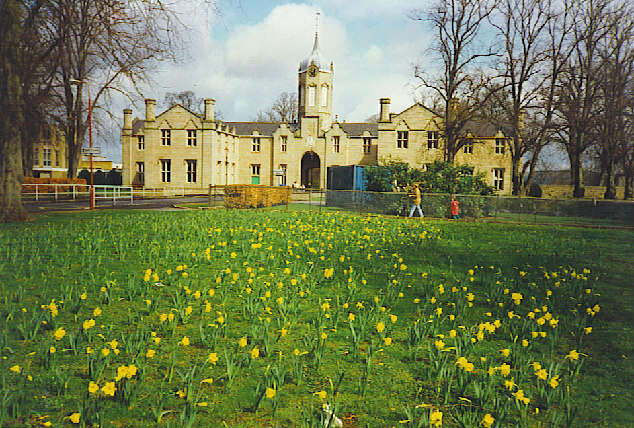

Location
- Huntly, Aberdeenshire, AB54 4SE; Scotland; 57°27′02″N 2°47′00″W

Information
- Type: Secondary School
- Motto: In Fas Constans
- Established: 1839; 187 years ago
- Founder: Duchess of Gordon
- Rector: Dr Matt Skellern
- Gender: Co-educational
- Age: 12 to 18
- Enrollment: 720 (approx)
- Houses: Badenoch, Fraser, Gordon, Seton
- Website: IThe Gordon Schools

The Gordon Schools is a six-year, non denominational comprehensive co-educational secondary school located in Huntly, Aberdeenshire, Scotland. It takes pupils from Gordon Primary School, Insch Primary School, and smaller primary schools located around that area of Aberdeenshire such as Drumblade, Glass, Forgue, Lumsden, Cairney, Rhynie and Kennethmont.

The School was founded in 1839 by the Duchess of Gordon as a memorial to her late husband. The original buildings were designed by Archibald Simpson.

== Notable former pupils ==
- John Andrew Crichton FRSE (1899-1985), nutritionist and agriculturalist
- William Dallas Allardice (1919 - 2003), Scottish Rugby player and WW2 commando
- Willie Donald (born 1953), cricketer and former president of Cricket Scotland
- Iona Fyfe (born 1998), award-winning Scots singer and musician.

== Notable staff ==
- Ronald Center (1917-1973), music teacher from 1943 to 1949.
- Dr George Trapp FRSE FRGS (1906-1996), headmaster from 1948 to 1960.
