= Cademuir International School =

Location
- Thornhill, Dumfriesshire; Scotland; 55.195°N 3.892°W

Information
- Type: Boarding school
- Established: 1990
- Locale: English; international student
- Head master: Robert Mulvey
- Grades: P7-S6
- Website: "Archived website". web.archive.org. Archived from the original on 20 January 2008.

Cademuir International School was a specialist school at Moniaive in Dumfries and Galloway, Scotland.

The school, founded by Robert Mulvey in 1990, was created to serve high ability learners and underachievers with high potential.

Latterly based at Crawfordton House, Moniaive, a listed building, it previously operated from near Peebles.

In 2002, the school was ranked second of 418 schools in Scotland for Higher Grade results.

Following controversial stories in the tabloid press, in 2004, an HMI report criticised the school, "particularly in the care and welfare areas of child protection, vetting of staff and restraint". A follow-up inspection criticised a "lack of stable and effective strategic leadership" on 13 September 2005.

In September 2006 the school went out of business due to financial difficulties. Its roll had dropped from 100 pupils to 34 at the time of its closure.

The school buildings were then placed on the market with an asking price of £1.3 million.

== See also ==
- Blairmore School
- Oxenfoord Castle School
- Rannoch School
- St Margaret's School, Edinburgh
