= Oxenfoord Castle School =

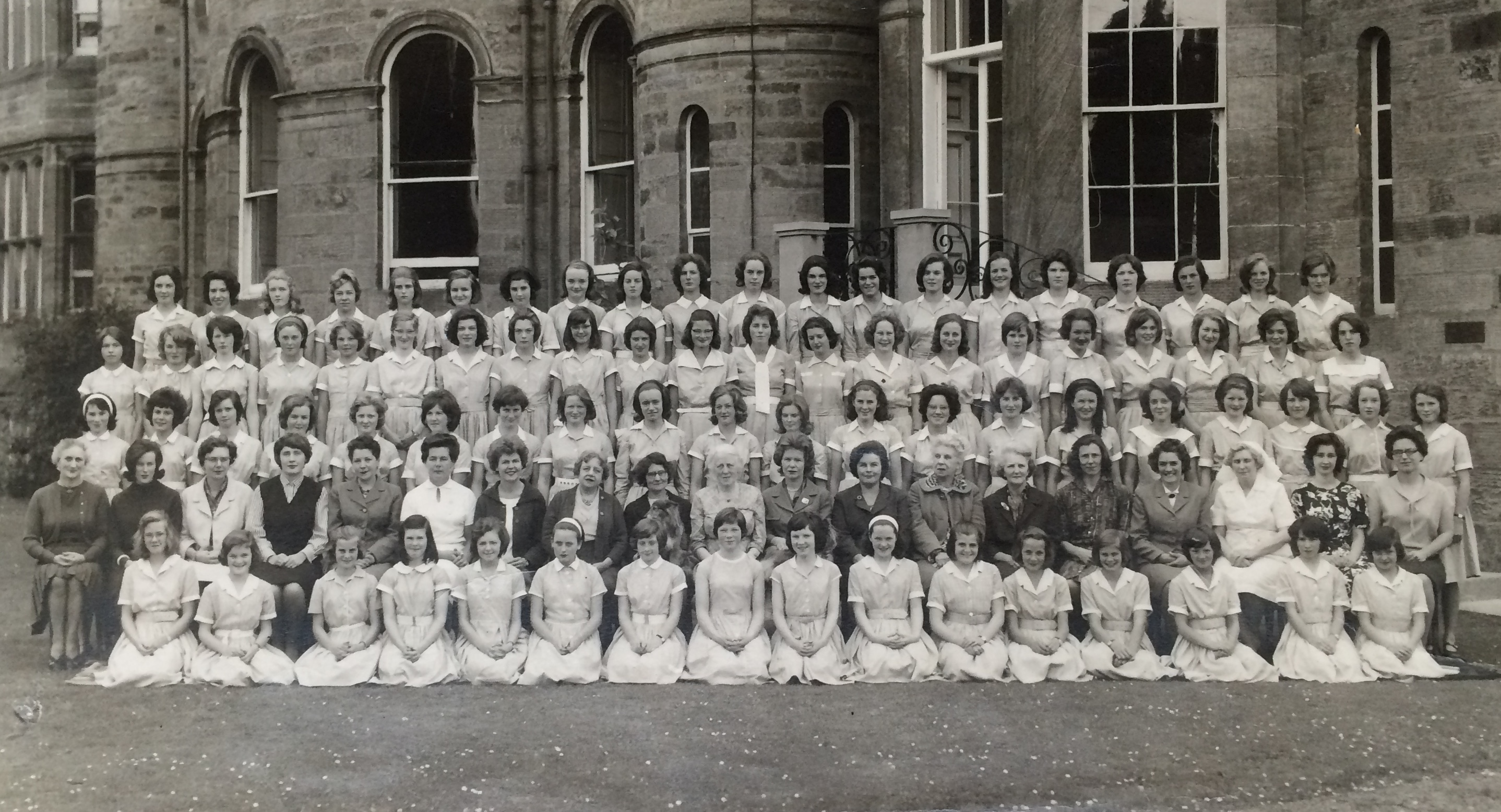
Pupils and teachers of Oxenfoord Castle School outside the school building in 1963

Oxenfoord Castle School was a girls' private boarding school, based at Oxenfoord Castle, Pathhead, Midlothian, near Edinburgh in Scotland.

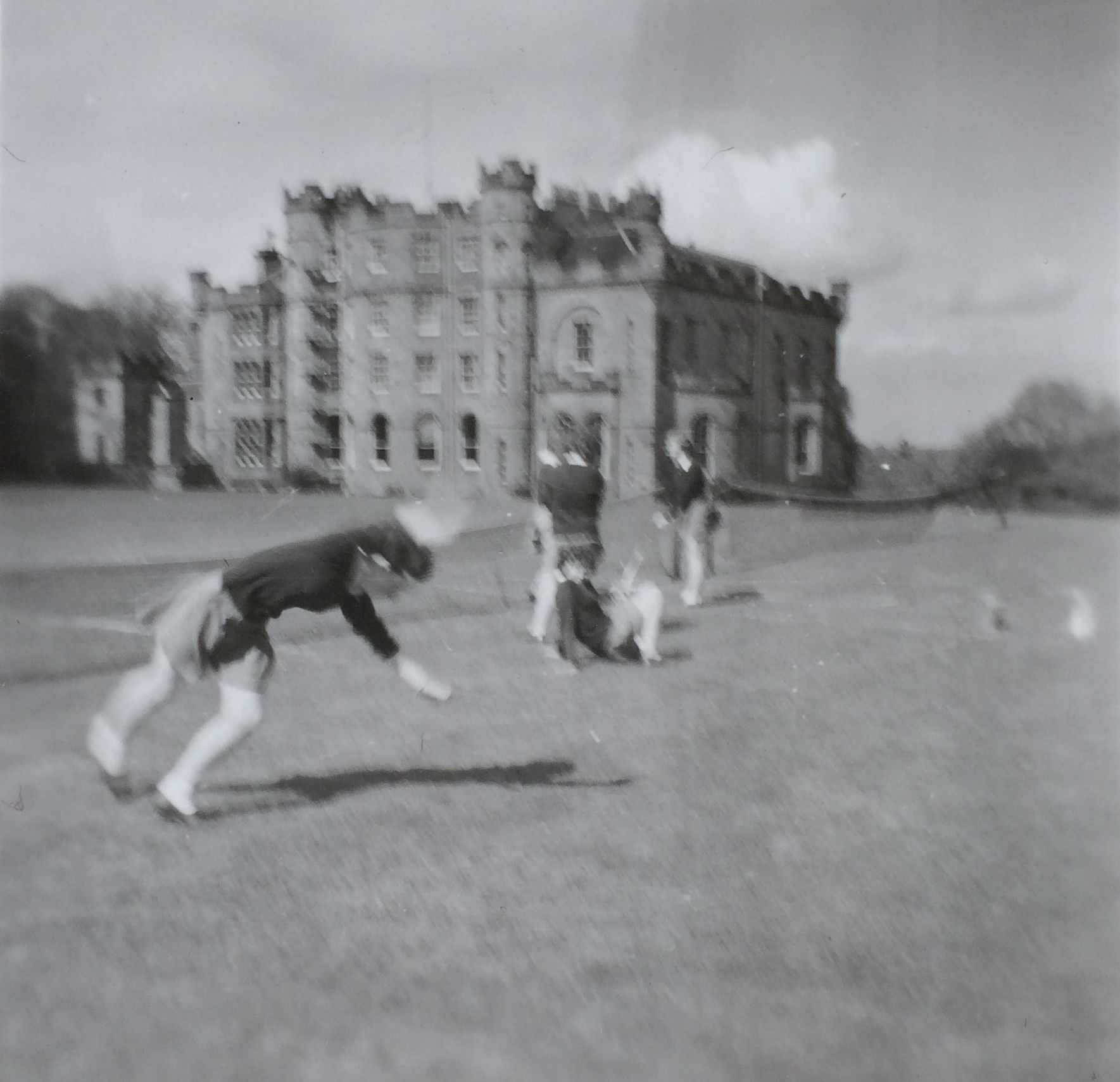
Oxenfoord Castle School building and some students in 1964

The school was founded in 1931 and closed in 1993. It was founded by Lady Marjorie Dalrymple, sister of John Dalrymple, 11th Earl of Stair.

== Alumni ==
- Celia, Viscountess Whitelaw of Penrith
- Cherry Drummond, 16th Baroness Strange

== See also ==
- Blairmore School, closed in same year as Oxenfoord.
- Cademuir International School
- Rannoch School
- St Margaret's School, Edinburgh
