= James Buchanan (teacher) =

James Buchanan (1849–1897) was a Scottish teacher and founder of St. Margaret's School, Edinburgh.

== Life and career ==
He was born in 1849 to John Buchanan (a house proprietor) and Janet Paton. He later attended St. Andrews University. There he received prizes in both Latin and English. He also played Kate Kennedy in the annual procession.

After graduating, he worked in Buckie school and then George Watson's Ladies' College. He then set up his own school, St. Margaret's.

He married Annie Custance Carr in 1884.

He died on 21 September 1897, of "cerebral apoplexy".
