= Dallas Allardice =

Scotland international rugby union player

- Full name: William Dallas Allardice
- Born: 4 November 1919 Glasgow, Scotland
- Died: 4 June 2003 (aged 83) Dundee, Scotland
- School: Gordon School; Aberdeen Grammar School
- Occupation: Teacher

Rugby union career
- Position: Scrum-half
International career
Years	Team	Apps	(Points)
1947–49	Scotland	8	(5)

William Dallas Allardice (4 November 1919 — 4 June 2003) was a Scottish international rugby union player. He also played association football for Huntly FC as a centre-forward.

Born in Glasgow, Allardice attended Gordon School in Huntly, having moved there with his family at age five. He completed his schooling as a boarder at Aberdeen Grammar School.

Allardice served with the London Scottish 1st Battalion in Norway during the early stage of World War II, before training as a commando and being posted to Libya as part of the Long Range Desert Group. His unit suffered heavily casualties in Tobruk, with Allardice one of only three to survive. He was captured by German troops and made a prisoner of war in Italy, from which he escaped with a fellow Scottish soldier. They took refuge under the care of pentecostals in a mountainous area near Rome and remained there until the liberation of Italy.

A diminutive scrum-half, Allardice played his rugby with Aberdeen Grammar School Former Pupils and was capped eight times for Scotland between 1947 and 1949. He made his debut against the touring Wallabies at Murrayfield in 1947, then played in all of Scotland's 1948 and 1949 Five Nations fixtures.

Allardice had a trophy named after him for an annual fixture between Aberdeen Grammar and Dundee High School.

== See also ==
- List of Scotland national rugby union players
