= Simone Kenyon =

Simone Kenyon is a performer, artist and producer born in Bradford, West Yorkshire, England. She works extensively with walking, and in collaboration with other artists and dancers. In 2006, with the dancer Tamara Ashley, she made 'The Pennine Way: The Legs that Make Us', a durational art project in the form of a walk, creating a performance lecture about the project for ROAM a weekend of walking at Loughborough University in 2008, and a book published by Brief Magnetics in 2007. With Andrew Brown and Katie Doubleday she instigated the 'Open City' project in 2006, exploring the organisation and control of behaviour in the public realm. Kenyon worked with Deveron Arts in Huntly, Aberdeenshire on the founding of their "Walking Institute" and completed a commission 'Hielan' Ways' - a long distance walk in the Cairngorms in 2013-14. She has also completed walking-based work Step by Step, 2013 for Dance4 in collaboration with Neil Callaghan. Kenyon is connected with the Walking Artists Network.

== Works ==
Into the Mountain (2019) took place in the Cairgorm mountains in Scotland. Produced by the Scottish Sculpture Workshop, audiences undertook walks through the landscape encountering dancers on the route. The project was inspired by the writings of Nan Shepherd and celebrates women's relationships with high and wild places.
