= St Margaret's School, Edinburgh =

Former school in Newington, Edinburgh

Coordinates: 55°55′47″N 3°10′07″W

St Margaret's School

Location
- 4 East Suffolk Rd; Edinburgh, EH16 5PJ; Scotland

Information
- Type: Independent
- Motto: Fortiter Vivamus (Latin: "Let us Live Bravely")
- Established: 1890
- Closed: 2010
- Gender: Female
- Age: Nursery to 18
- Founder: James Buchanan

St. Margaret's School was a private school in the Newington area of Edinburgh, Scotland. The curriculum was based on the Scottish education system. The school was one of three all-girls, private, fee-paying schools based in the Edinburgh district. The school was a primarily a day-school, but did offer boarding to cater for students staying away from home.

== History ==
=== Foundation and early years: 1890–1897 ===
St. Margaret's was founded in 1890 by James Buchanan. Buchanan housed his fledgling school in two identical specifically designed buildings, one on East Suffolk Road in Newington, the other on Egypt Terrace (now part of Cluny Drive) in Morningside. The total cost of both buildings was £6,000. This equates to about £54,000 in today's money. The school was named after Saint Margaret of Scotland.

Buchanan initially named his new school The Queen Margaret College for Young Ladies. The inclusion of the word College in the name was to emphasise that secondary education was available. Prior to the school's opening on 1 October 1890, Buchanan had placed daily adverts in The Scotsman'; giving out handbills to local businesses and creating a prospectus for parents. The result of this work was an opening roll of over 200.

Though the two schools were separate in some respects (each had its own headmistress), girls and staff knew each other well and often commuted between the two campuses. Buchanan was Principal of both schools and taught English.

=== The reign of Annie Buchanan and the sale of the schools 1897–1929 ===
As James Buchanan had died shortly before the new term was to begin, swift action was required. He had left a trust for the school, and that combined with his life insurance payout provided for the support of his wife and children (who would have otherwise had no income) and paid off much of the loan on the school's two buildings. His wife, Annie Custance Buchanan (née Carr) was appointed as Principal and, despite having a young family to look after, threw herself into the role. She remained in the post for over 30 years.

During Annie Buchanan's principalship, St. Margaret's went from strength to strength. In 1903, the school was the first independent school in Edinburgh to offer a "Leaving Certificate" (the equivalent of today's Standard Grade and Higher qualifications). In 1904, the school began Fröbel training for staff, another first for the city.

In December 1903, a fire broke out at the East Suffolk Road building. There was a considerable amount of damage and girls had to be taught temporarily at the Livingstone Halls on Clerk Street (now a video rental shop). In 1914, the Territorial Army requisitioned Mrs Buchanan's office for a period.

In 1926, Annie Buchanan sold the Morningside school to Miss Muirhead, who renamed it St. Hilary's. In 1929, she sold the Newington school to Miss Matthew, who decided to keep the name St. Margaret's (a decision that much pleased Mrs Buchanan).

=== Miss Matthew, World War Two and Independence 1929–1960 ===
Prior to buying the school and taking on the role as Principal, Miss Matthew was already established at St. Margaret's, being a Housemistress and a teacher of Latin. It was she who came up with the school's motto, Fortiter Vivamus, which translates from Latin as Let us Live Bravely.

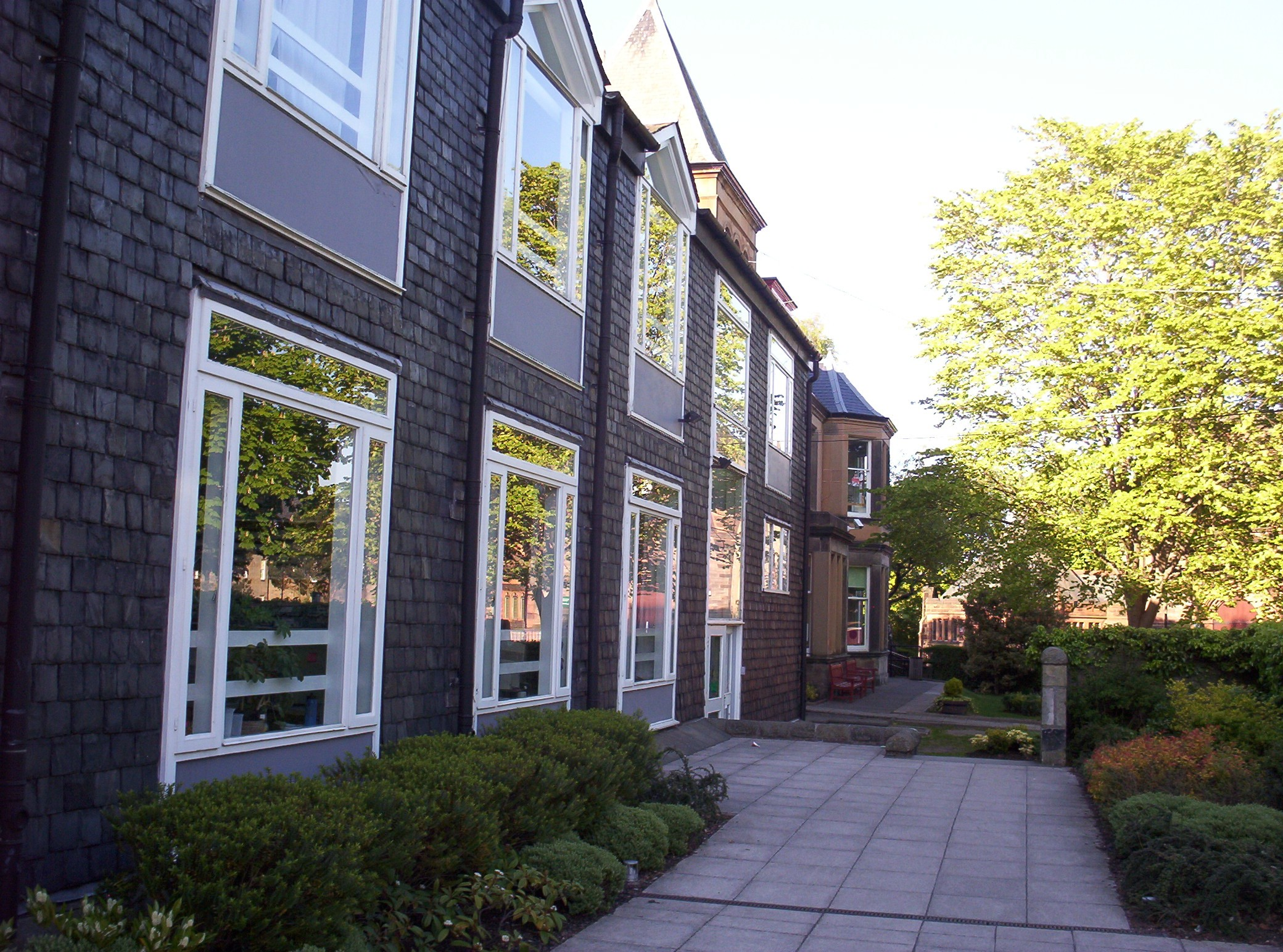
Matthew House, finished in 1972 and named after Miss Matthew

The Second World War meant that most of St. Margaret's, like many other schools, had to leave Edinburgh. From the academic year 1939/40 all the boarders and many of the day girls decamped to Strathtay. The school moved to Dunkeld seven months later then to Auchterarder in July 1944. When the war finished in 1945, there was no longer enough space to house all the pupils at East Suffolk road. As such, the division of the school continued until 1956.

The school celebrated its Diamond Jubilee in 1950.

In 1960, Miss Matthew decided to transfer the school from private ownership to a Company Limited by Guarantee, to be administered by a Board of Governors. This came into effect on 1 January 1961, and the school became an independent fee-paying school for upper-class families based in Scotland.

=== New buildings, a new badge and the centenary 1961–1990 ===
This period brought many changes to the school buildings, with the acquisition of Craigmillar House in 1962, Craigmillar Park Church in 1965 (now Buchanan House), Senior College in 1983 and Muirhead House in 1984. The building of Matthew House was completed in 1972, and extensive refurbishment work was carried out on the Pavilion and the science laboratories.

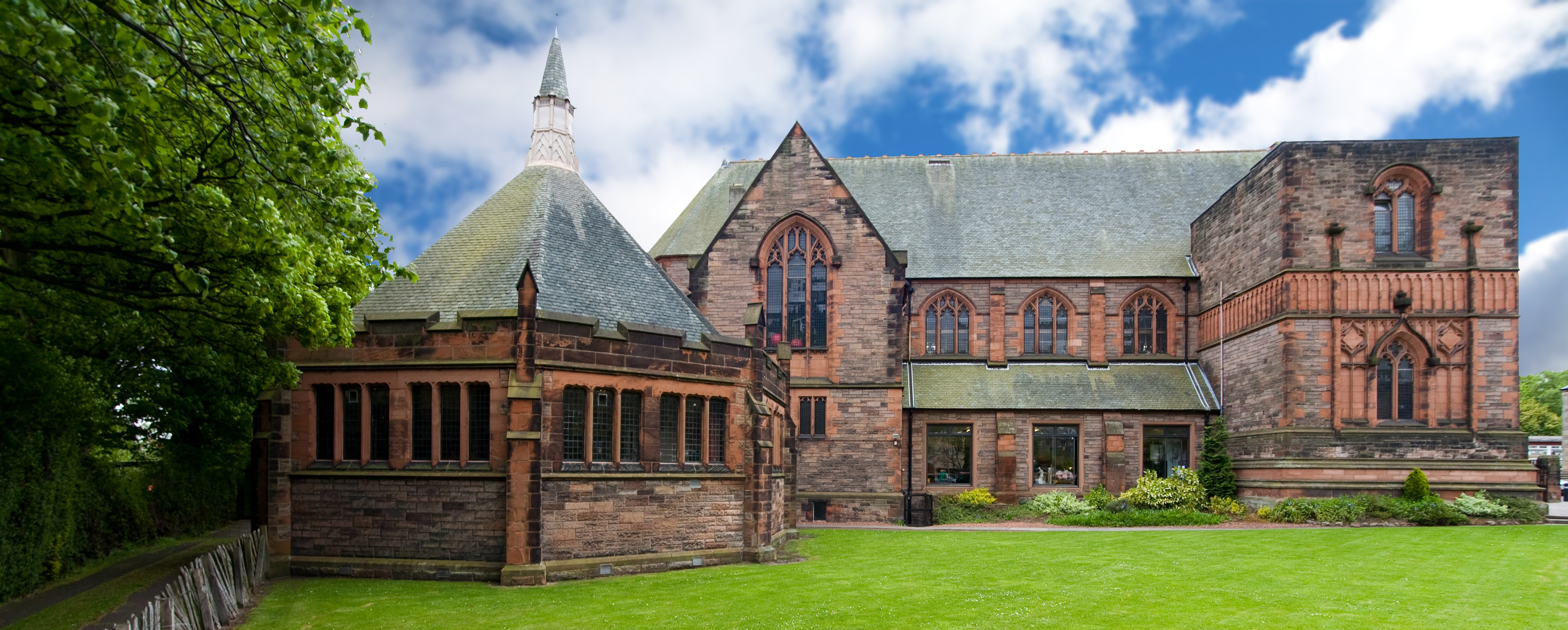
Buchanan House, showing Buchanan Hall and the Round Hall

In 1965 the school celebrated its 75th anniversary, and to commemorate this the daughters of Mr and Mrs Buchanan donated a plaque.

In 1967 a Clothing Exchange which enabled the purchase of second-hand uniform was established, and continued until the closure of the school.

In 1983, St. Hilary's merged with St. Margaret's, reuniting the two schools. The merger necessitated a new school badge. The badge is lozenge-shaped, and has the cross of St. Margaret surrounded by four martlets on the upper half, and the cedar tree of St. Hilary's on the lower half.

In 1990, the school celebrated its centenary. Several events took place throughout the year to commemorate this anniversary. One such event was a special trip in conjunction with the Forth Bridge (also celebrating its centenary) – girls (escorted by a piper) boarded a steam train bound for Dunfermline, where they visited St. Margaret's grave at Dunfermline Abbey.

=== St. Margaret's 1991–2010 ===
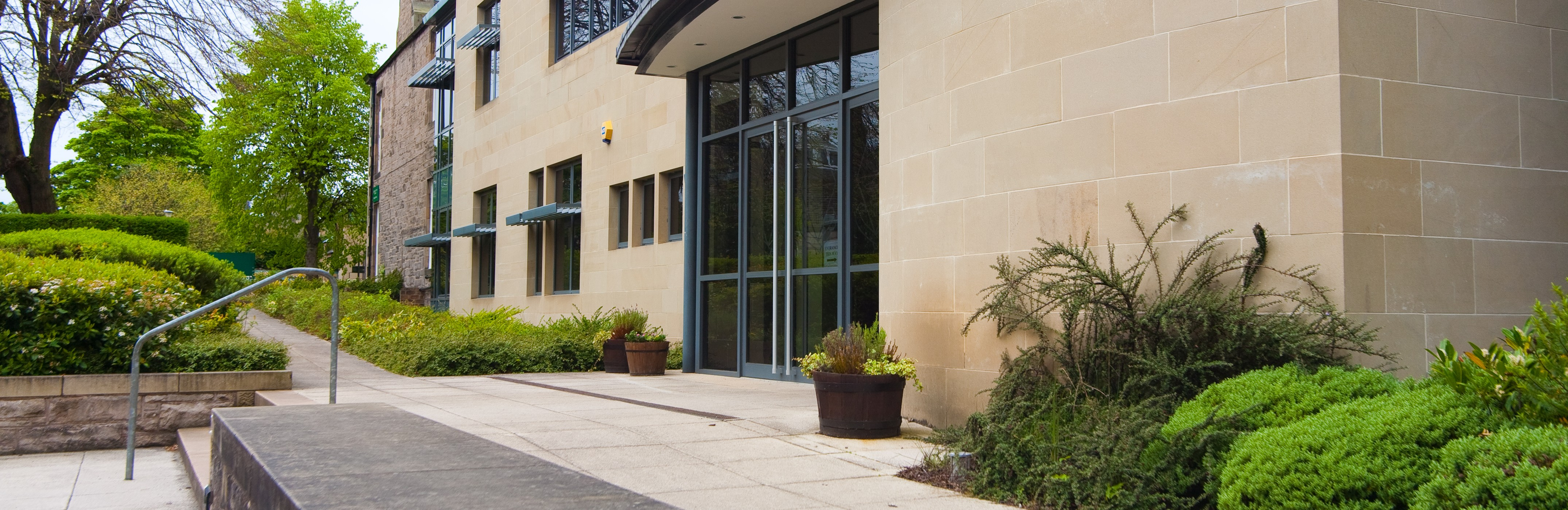
One of St. Margaret's newest buildings

In 1998, the school merged with another independent girls' school, St. Denis and Cranley. St. Denis and Cranley school was located on Ettrick Road in the Merchiston area of Edinburgh.

There were subsequently several changes in the buildings that housed St. Margarets, with Senior College, Maclean House and Muirhead House all being sold, and new buildings built and acquired closer to East Suffolk Road.

=== Closure ===
It was announced on 10 June 2010 that the school would close due to low pupil numbers owing to an increase in coeducational private schools.

== Music ==
St. Margaret's had a strong musical tradition, and in 1984 the school choir won in the Youth Choir section. Llangollen International Eisteddfod.

== Notable former pupils ==
This list includes people who went to schools merged into St Margaret's.

- Dr. Margaret Blackwood (1924-1994), MBE, Disabilities campaigner and founder of Blackwood Homes and Care
- Joanna Cherry, SNP politician
- Leeona Dorrian, Lady Dorrian
- Katie Hagmann, SNP politician
- Elspeth Candlish Henderson, Battle of Britain WAAF who won the Military Medal
- Alex Mahon (born 1973), CEO-designate of Channel 4
- Alice Morrison, Scottish adventurer, author and television presenter
- Della Purves, botanical artist
- Fiona Woolf, Lord Mayor of London
- Lesley Yellowlees, inorganic chemist and was the first female president of the Royal Society of Chemistry

As a result of mergers with St. Hilary's and St. Denis and Cranley, there are currently three associations supporting former pupils: The St. Margaret's Association, The St. Denis and Cranley Association and The Cranley Club.

== See also ==
- Blairmore School
- Cademuir International School
- Oxenfoord Castle School, a now closed (1993) girls' school outside Edinburgh.
- Rannoch School
