= Stewart's Hall =

Municipal building in Huntly, Scotland

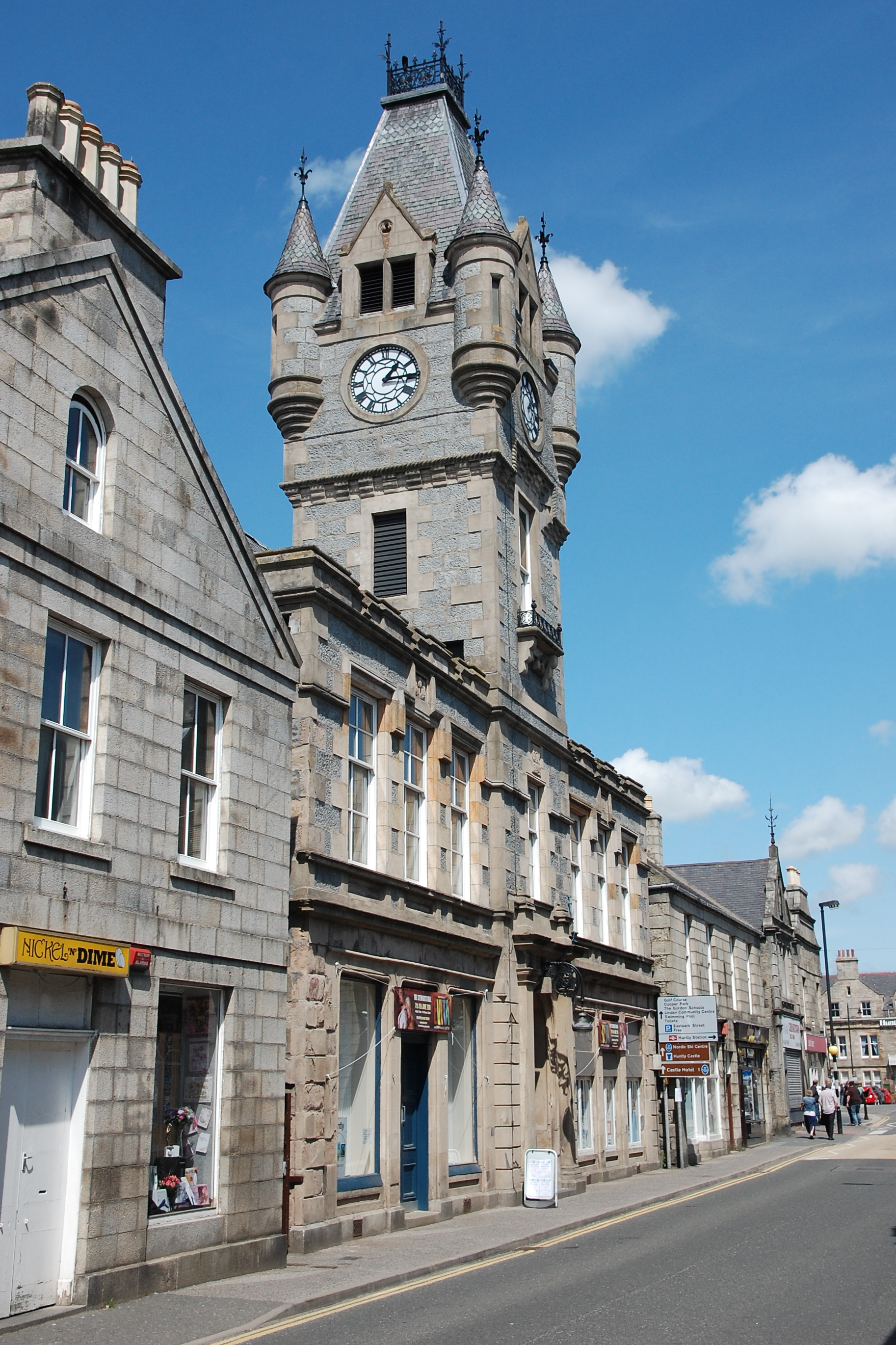
- The building in 2016

- Shown in Aberdeenshire
- 57.4470°N 2.7872°W
- Location: Gordon Street, Huntly

History
- Built: 1875 (151 years ago)

Site notes
- Architect: James Anderson
- Architectural style: Scottish baronial style

Listed Building – Category C(S)
- Official name: Stewart's Hall, 15, 17 Gordon Street
- Designated: 16 April 1971
- Reference no.: LB34914

Stewart's Hall, formerly Huntly Town Hall, is a municipal structure in Gordon Street, Huntly, Aberdeenshire, Scotland. The structure, which is used as a community events venue, is a Category C listed building.

== History ==
The building was commissioned from the proceeds of a legacy from the former chief magistrate Alexander Stewart. It was designed by James Anderson of Huntly in the Scottish baronial style, built in granite from the Syllavethy Quarry at a cost of £3,000 and was officially opened by Sheriff of Forfarshire, John Comrie Thomson, in 1875.

The design involved a symmetrical main frontage with seven bays facing onto Gordon Street; the central bay, which slightly projected forward, featured a four-stage tower with a doorway flanked by Doric order pilasters supporting an entablature in the first stage, a sash window with quoins in the second stage, a sash window with quoins and a window cill in the third stage, and four clock faces in the fourth stage. The fourth stage was augmented by bartizans at the corners and surmounted by a truncated pyramid-shaped roof. The other bays on the ground floor contained large rectangular openings while the other bays on the first floor were fenestrated by sash windows with quoins and hood moulds. The bell for the clock tower was designed and manufactured by John C. Wilson of the Gorbals Brass and Bell Foundry in Glasgow. Internally, the principal room was a large assembly hall intended for concerts and theatrical performances.

The building was completed gutted in a fire in 1886 and was rebuilt, in a similar style, to a design by the firm of Matthews & Mackenzie in 1887. Following the death of Charles Gordon-Lennox, 8th Duke of Richmond, all the property and feus in the town, along with much surrounding farmland, was sold at auction in the building in August 1936 in order to pay death duties on the ducal estates. The building continued to serve as the meeting place of the burgh council for much of the 20th century, but ceased to be the local seat of government when the enlarged Gordon District Council was formed in 1975. Since then the main role of the building has been that of a community events venue.

== See also ==
- List of listed buildings in Huntly, Aberdeenshire
