= Elspeth Green =

British air force officer (1913–2006)

- Born: Elspeth Candlish Henderson; 16 June 1913
- Died: 24 August 2006 (aged 93)
- Education: St. Denis School, Edinburgh; Harrogate Ladies' College
- Occupation: Secretary
- Organization: British Council
- Works: Edinburgh International Festival
- Spouse: Alastair McWatt Green (m. 1949 d. 1991)
- Military career
- Branch: Women's Auxiliary Air Force
- Service years: 1940–1946
- Rank: Squadron Officer
- Conflicts: Battle of Britain
- Awards: Military Medal

Elspeth Candlish Green (née Henderson; 16 June 1913 – 24 August 2006) was an NCO and officer in the Women's Auxiliary Air Force (WAAF). She was a plotter during the Battle of Britain, serving at Biggin Hill where she won the Military Medal for her bravery during repeated air raids.

After the war, she worked for the British Council and the first Edinburgh International Festival.

== Early life ==
She was born on 16 June 1913. Her father was Robert Candlish Henderson (1874–1964), the professor of Scots law at Edinburgh University. She was educated at the private school of St. Denis in Edinburgh and then the Harrogate Ladies' College. She then travelled in Ceylon and Europe where she became fluent in French and German.

== Second World War ==
During the Second World War, she initially worked for the Voluntary Aid Detachment (VAD) as a driver and first aider. In January 1940, she joined the Women's Auxiliary Air Force, was given two weeks of training as a plotter, and then posted to RAF Biggin Hill – a front-line base in the Battle of Britain. During August of that year, at the height of the battle, she was responsible for maintaining contact with RAF Uxbridge – the headquarters of No. 11 Group, defending London and the South East of England. Biggin Hill was bombed repeatedly – six raids in three days – and she was in the thick of the action: digging out fellow WAAFs from bombed trenches, avoiding unexploded bombs and surviving the blast from the bombs that did explode. Throughout, she continued to perform her duty and maintain effective communications. When her operations room received a direct hit, she was knocked down by the bomb blast but continued to stay on the line until she was ordered to leave the burning building and had to exit through a broken window.

In November 1940, she and two other WAAFs at Biggin Hill – Helen Turner and Elizabeth Mortimer – were awarded the Military Medal for "courage and example of a high order". Only six WAAFs received this award during the Second World War. She was reticent about the award and her wartime service and so, thereafter, her friends and relations were surprised to learn of it. Henderson and Turner were the subjects of a 1941 portrait – Assistant Section Leader E. Henderson, MM, and Sergeant H. Turner, MM, Women's Auxiliary Air Service – which was commissioned by the War Artists' Advisory Committee and painted by Laura Knight.

She was trained for cipher work and then commissioned as an officer. She worked on bomber bases for the rest of the war, finally doing duty as a welfare officer in Egypt in 1945. She was demobbed in 1946 as a Squadron Officer.

== Personal life ==
She married Alastair McWatt Green in 1949 and then focussed on raising her family – a son and a daughter. She continued to do charitable and voluntary work in Edinburgh, especially for the Aged Christian Friends Society. She died on 24 August 2006.
