= George Trapp (educator) =

Scottish academic scientist and educator

Dr George Trapp FRSE FRGS FLS FEIS LLB (1906–1996) was a 20th century Scottish academic scientist and educator.

He was Convenor of the Science Committee for the Educational Institute of Scotland.

== Life ==
He was born in Falkirk on 30 December 1906 the son of Peter Trapp, chief engineer at Camelon Iron Works, and his wife, Jane. He was educated at Falkirk High School. In 1924 he went to the Foundry Technical Institute in Falkirk for practical experience as a metallurgical chemist.

In 1925 he went to Glasgow University to study Sciences, specialising in Chemistry and Botany. He graduated MA (1929) BSc (1930). After a period of practical experience, in 1932 he entered Moray House College of Education in Edinburgh and gained his Diploma in Education in 1933. He then returned to Glasgow University as a postgraduate, receiving his doctorate (PhD) in summer of 1934. He then found immediate employment as Assistant Science Master at his alma mater, Falkirk High School, teaching Botany, Geography and Chemistry.

In 1937 he moved to George Watson's College in Edinburgh as Biology Master.

In 1941 he was elected a Fellow of the Royal Society of Edinburgh. His proposers were Sir William Wright Smith, Alfred Cameron, Ernest Shearer, and Edward Wyllie Fenton. In 1943 he was made a Fellow of the Linnean Society.

In August 1943 he was appointed Assistant Director of Education for Aberdeenshire.

From 1948 to 1960 he was Rector of Gordon Schools in Huntly, Aberdeenshire. He moved back to Edinburgh with his family in 1960 and took a course on Scots Law.

He died in Edinburgh on 15 May 1996 aged 89.

== Family ==
He married Alice in 1948. They had one son and two daughters.

== Publications ==
- Discipline (1959)
- Private Prosecution in Scotland (1975)
- The Application of Absolute Privilege (1980)
