= Cabrach =

Estate and community in Moray, Scotland

Coordinates: 57.328°N 03.016°W

Cabrach: Scottish Gaelic: A' Chabrach, A' Chabraich
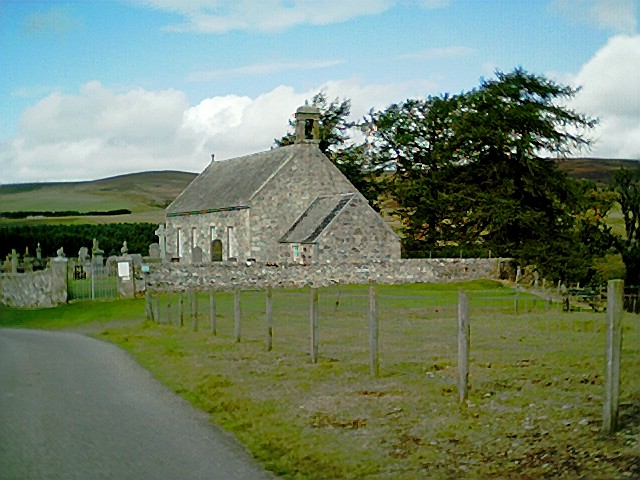
- Cabrach Church

- Location within Moray
- Population: 69 (2011)
- OS grid reference: NJ3827
- Civil parish: Cabrach
- Council area: Moray
- Lieutenancy area: Banffshire
- Country: Scotland
- Sovereign state: United Kingdom
- Post town: HUNTLY
- Postcode district: AB54
- Dialling code: 01466
- Police: Scotland
- Fire: Scottish
- Ambulance: Scottish
- UK Parliament: Moray
- Scottish Parliament: Moray; Highlands and Islands

The Cabrach (Scottish Gaelic: A' Chabrach, A' Chabraich) is an estate and largely depopulated rural community in Moray, Scotland. The meaning of the name has been much disputed.

== Etymology ==
Traditionally it is held to mean "timber moss", though this has no recognisable counterpart in Scottish Gaelic, and Alexander Smith (1875) suggests no Gaelic meaning can be assigned. Iain Mac an Tàilleir (2003) gives a meaning "antler place" referring to shed antlers, (cf: Caberfeidh) whilst Ainmean-Àite na h-Alba, the national advisory partnership for Gaelic place-names in Scotland, suggests "the place of the trees".

== History ==
A June 2019 news item indicates that "illicit whisky production and smuggling" was rampant at one time, during the 18th century and early 19th century "making it one of the most important birthplaces of malt whisky", according to another source. According to another source, "at its peak, there were well over 100 pot stills scattered throughout The Cabrach" but "the last of these had closed by 1851". After distilling became legal, three distilleries began to operate here after 1823: "the Cabrach Distillery at Mains of Lesmurdie and Tomnaven, in the Lower Cabrach; and Blackmiddens (later renamed Buck) in the Upper Cabrach". All had closed by the 1840s.

A report published in 1846 defined the Cabrach as: "a parish, partly in the district of Alford, county of Aberdeen, but chiefly in the county of Banff, 12 miles (W.) from Clatt; containing 827 inhabitants". The primary pursuits were agriculture, peat cutting, and hunting. Some farms raised cattle, "the black native breed" and sheep which were sent to market. Limestone was readily available. By then, the last two distilleries of "malt spirits" had closed. A church built in 1876, a parochial school and a manse were noted in the report. The church, defined as the "Cabrach Parish Church", still stood in 2017, "in open countryside" but was only in occasional use and only during summer. The Category B church, confirmed as having been built in 1786, was listed as being of interest by Historic Scotland in 1972, (Listing number LB2255). Other Listed properties in the general area include the church burial ground, a bridge at Cabrach, Deveron House (built in 1801-1802) and its garden wall, and another bridge at Milltown Burn, Milltown. Deveron House was added to the Buildings at Risk register in 2018. Aberdeenshire Council lists the House as "Former Church of Scotland Manse and steading".

Photographs of the Cabrach from 2019 confirm that many abandoned farm houses still stand. Much of the population had been lost in the first decades of the 20th century when industrialization drew people to cities, and because of deaths during WWI. A 2018 news report explains that "an extraordinarily large proportion of men and boys ... died, not just in battle, but from the wider effects of war, such as illnesses from which they had no immunity".

At the end of the 19th century, the population was approximately 1,000. As of November 2018, the estimated population was 70.

The Cabrach Trust was planning to create a Heritage Centre, to present the history of the estate, "memories of the past", of an area which is now "sparsely populated". Fund raising was underway in 2019. The Heritage Manager of The Trust made this comment to a reporter in March 2019: "The Cabrach has played a central role in Scottish history; it was the home of Jacobite rebels, its illegal whisky trade led to the Scotch whisky industry we know today, and its people fought in the country’s great wars but all this was in danger of being forgotten". The plans for the centre indicate the location as Inverharroch Farm, eight miles from Dufftown.

The area contains a nuclear bunker that was used during the Cold War as a "monitoring post". Built in the 1960s, the facility closed in 1992, and remains in "remarkably good condition", though stripped of its contents, such as beds, canned food and water, instruments and identification charts. Some of those items can be seen at the Alford Heritage Museum. Except for a special event in August 2018, the bunker, (known as Post 32), has not been open to the public. It is located on a property that is owned by the Cabrach Trust.

== Geography ==
The Cabrach, located in rural Moray, is a sparsely populated area ten miles (16 km) wide by eight miles (13 km) long consisting of mountainous terrain. It lies on the northernmost fringe of the Cairngorms National Park at the intersection of the countryside roads that connect Speyside to the north, Aberdeen to the east and, Donside to the south. The town of Huntly is 16 miles (26 km) away. Elgin, the main town in the region, is 30 miles (48 km) to the north.

The Cabrach has been designated an Area of Outstanding Natural Beauty.

== Highland Games ==
The Cabrach Picnic and Games in Moray were fixtures on the Highland Games calendar from 1877–1935. After an 87-year pause, the Calbrach Trust resumed the games. The winner receives the Rose Bowl trophy, which was recovered from the family of the games' last winner Charles Taylor.
