= Rannoch School =

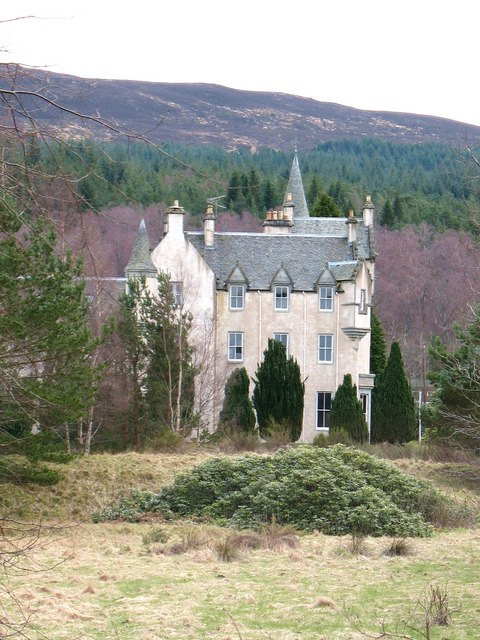

Location
- Near Kinloch Rannoch and Pitlochry; Scotland; 56°40′45″N 4°17′37″W

Information
- Type: Private boarding secondary
- Motto: In pursuit of all round excellence
- Established: 1959
- Founders: A.J.S. Greig, P. Whitworth and J. Fleming
- Closed: 2002
- Grades: P7-S6 (Years 1-Upper 6)
- Gender: Co-educational
- Age: 10 to 18
- Enrolment: c. 300 at max
- Campus size: c. 90 acres (36 ha)
- Campus type: Rural
- Alumni: Old Rannochians

Rannoch School was a private boarding school, located on the south shore of Loch Rannoch in Perth and Kinross, Scotland on the Dall Estate, 6 miles (9.7 km) from Kinloch Rannoch. Dall House served as the main school building and a boarding house.

It was established by three masters from Gordonstoun School and opened on 24 September 1959 with 82 boys. The school's ethos was enshrined in its principle of "in pursuit of all round excellence" based on the philosophies of Kurt Hahn.

Rannoch's location in the Highland Perthshire glens lent itself well to Outward Bound pursuits, which became a large part of the school's activities.

== Dall House ==
Dall House was the main school building. It housed two of the boys’ boarding houses, the dining hall, kitchens, masters common room and headmasters office, and in later years the girls boarding house.

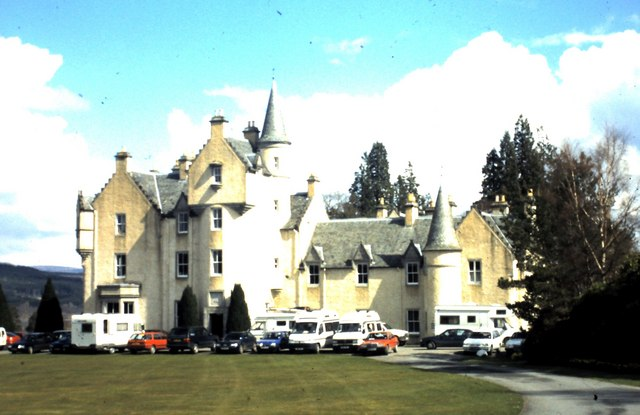
Dall House

The estate dates back to 1347. Dall House was built in 1855 as a principal seat of the Clan Robertson, which it remained until the early last century. In 1860 it was sold to Thomas Frederick Charles Vernon Wentworth of Yorkshire. It passed to his son Captain Bruce Vernon-Wentworth, who used to visit during the autumn shooting season. He took his staff from his main residence at Wentworth Castle in Yorkshire during the season and after the end of World War II lived there full-time until his death in 1951.

He is buried at a private grave site by the burn adjacent to the house. The building is a romantically styled Scots Baronial mansion house designed by architects Thomas Mackenzie and James Matthews. Prior to being purchased by the school, it was used as offices by the Forestry Commission.

== Closure in 2002 ==
In 2002, Rannoch School closed permanently, having been threatened with closure the previous year but lasting another 12 months through financial donations and publicity. The number of parents willing to send their children to boarding school had decreased, and the remoteness of Rannoch and lack of public transport meant that opportunities for day pupils were very limited, being 6 miles (9.7 km) from the nearest village and an hour's drive from the nearest city, Perth.

== Old Rannochians ==
Rannoch produced a number of distinguished alumni known as "Old Rannochians", including:

- David Brudenell-Bruce, 9th Marquess of Ailesbury
- Graeme Lamb, British General
- Patrick Singleton, Bermudian luger
- Tom Smith, 1971-2022 International Rugby Player: Scotland (61 caps) and British & Irish Lions (6 caps over 2 tours)

== See also ==
- Blairmore School
- Cademuir International School
- Oxenfoord Castle School
- St Margaret's School, Edinburgh
