= Ken Ballantyne =

Scottish athlete (1940–2016)

- Born: 15 October 1940; India
- Died: 10 November 2016 (aged 76)
- Education: Strathallan School

Ken Ballantyne (15 October 1940 – 10 November 2016) was a Scottish athlete who specialised in the mile. He represented Scotland in international competition between 1961 and 1966.

== Athletics ==
Ballantyne was born in India and educated at Blairmore School and Strathallan School in Scotland. Whilst at Strathallan he won the Scottish Schools Championship mile in 1958. In 1959 he won the Scottish junior mile beating the previous record by 5 seconds.

He became a trainee manager with the Commercial Union insurance company in Edinburgh and joined Edinburgh Southern Harriers athletics club. Initially, he trained at Old Meadowbank and Inverleith Park. Like many athletes of the time, he was self coached and was a disciple of Arthur Lydiard.

In 1964 he became Scottish champion at the mile, placing in the medals on a further three occasions. On 21 July 1965 at Motspur Park he became famous for running the fastest time in the mile race by a home-based Scot, in 4m. 1.1, narrowly missing out on the four-minute mile. Between 1959 and 1971 he featured in the national rankings every year at a range of distances from the mile to six miles.

Ballantyne was also a talented cross country and road runner. With the Edinburgh Southern Harriers team he won three gold medals, as well as silvers and bronze at the National Cross Country Championships. He also won gold at the Edinburgh to Glasgow road relay in 1969, and had several top three placings.

After his competitive retirement he joined the Edinburgh Southern Harriers committee. He became their British League assistant manager to Jimmy Smart, taking over in 1982. Under his stewardship the club had some success competing in the first division of the British League and winning the 1975 British Gold Cup.
