= Avochie Castle =

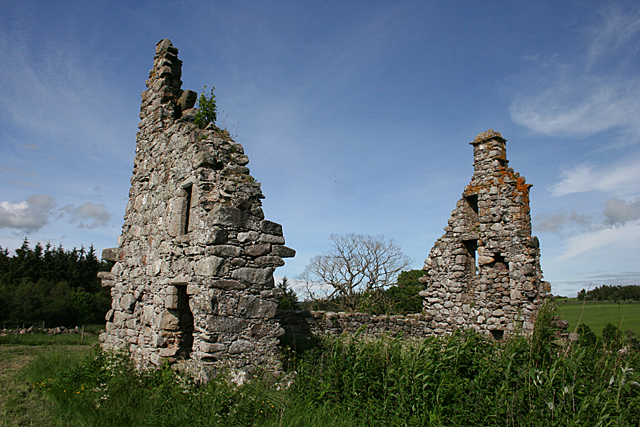
- Avochie Castle

Location
- Coordinates: 57.5075°N 2.7806°W

Site history
- Built: 16th century

Avochie Castle is a ruined tower house, dating from the 16th century, or early 17th century, around 4.5 miles (7.2 km) north of Huntly, east of the river Deveron, in Aberdeenshire, Scotland.

The modern Avochie House is just to the west.

== History ==
This was originally a property of the Gordons of Avochie, who were active in the conflicts of the reign of Mary Queen of Scots and her son James VI.

It was the property of Adam Hay Gordon in 1871, and remains part of Avochie Estate.

== Structure ==
The gable ends, with a corbelled-out bartizan at the south-east, are all that remains of the castle.

It has been said, “It has scarcely a claim to be the title of "Castle" as it was only a small quadrangular building of scarcely two stories”. Its dimensions are 45 by 21 feet (13.7 by 6.4 m).

It is a category B listed building.
