= Ronald Center =

Scottish composer

- Born: 2 April 1913; Aberdeen, Scotland
- Died: 18 April 1973 (aged 60)
- Occupation: composer
- Known for: conductor of the Huntly Choral Society
- Notable work: The Coming of Cuchulain
- Spouse: Evelyn Center (nee Morrison)

Ronald Center (2 April 1913 – 18 April 1973) was a Scottish composer.

== Biography ==
Center was born in Aberdeen where he studied piano under Julian Rosetti and organ under Willan Swainson. In 1943 he moved to Huntly, Aberdeenshire as music master of Huntly Gordon School for a period of six years, before turning to private teaching and composition. He remained in Huntly for the rest of his life, and was conductor of the Huntly Choral Society.

He first became known as a recitalist, and also as an accompanist for his wife, the soprano Evelyn Center (Morrison). In 1944 his symphonic poem The Coming of Cuchulain was given by the Scottish Orchestra under Warwick Braithwaite. From then onwards his works began to be regularly broadcast by the BBC, particularly in their Modern Scottish Composers series. He performed many of his song settings with his wife Evelyn.

== Works ==
Center composed a symphony, the symphonic poem The Coming of Cuchulain, works for string orchestra, three string quartets, the cantata Dona Nobis Pacem (along with other choral pieces), and piano works including sets of Preludes, a Sonata and a Suite. His music draws on Scottish folk idioms, particularly the coronach and the reel. He has also been sometimes styled "the Scottish Bartok".

A revival of interest in Center's works in the late 1970s led to a piano recital in the Mitchell Hall of Marischal College, Aberdeen, on 14 October 1977 and an orchestral concert in King's College Chapel, Old Aberdeen on 10 March 1978. In May 1979, Thurso Choral Society performed the Contata and the Scottish Baroque Ensemble played Lacrimae in Aberdeen. In Bogotá, Colombia, Center's Requiem Mass was sung nine times between August and December and, in November, a Scottish Festival celebrated Center in ten concerts and recitals. In 1980, Ronald Stevenson played the Piano Sonata in Leeds. In 2013 Toccata Classics initiated a survey of his instrumental and chamber music: the third disc was released in 2024.

=== Orchestral and strings ===
- Symphony No. 1
- The Coming of Cuchulain
- Divertimento
- Sinfonietta
- Nocturne
- Lacrimae
- Elegy

=== Chamber ===
- String Quartet No. 1
- String Quartet No. 2
- String Quartet No. 3
- Violin Sonata
- Suite for solo violoncello
- Dance Rustique for violoncello and piano
- Duo for violin and violoncello (also violin and bassoon, oboe and violoncello, oboe and bassoon)
- Little Canon for violin and violoncello

=== Piano ===
- Sonata
- Sonatine
- Suite
- Three Movements
- Larghetto
- Pantomime in 3 movements
- Prelude, Aria and Finale
- Six Bagatelles
- Seven Preludes
- Three Preludes and Fugues
- Three Studies
- From Childhood
- Rumba
- Prelude
- Toccata
- Giglot
- Burlesca
- Homage
- Impromptu
- Air
- Sarabande
- Melodie
- Molto Allegro
- 2 Andantes
- Phantasy

== Recordings ==
- Instrumental and Chamber Music, Vol. I: Music for Solo Piano. Piano Sonata, 6 Bagatelles, and world premiere recordings of Pantomime, Andante, Sarabande, Air, Larghetto, Sonatine, Hommage, Three Etudes, Impromptu, Three Movements for Piano. Christopher Guild, piano. TOCC0179 (2013)
- Chamber and Instrumental Music, Vol. 2: Complete String Quartets. String Quartets Nos. 1, 2 and 3. The Fejes Quartet. TOCC0533 (2021)
- Instrumental and Chamber Music, Vol. 3. Violin Sonata, Suite for Piano, Seven Preludes, Three Preludes and Fugues. Tamás Fejes (violin), Balázs Renczés (cello), Christopher Guild (piano). TOCC0723 (2024)
- Center of Huntly String Quartet No. 2, Violin Sonata, Piano Sonata. Emily White and the Isla Quartet. Deveron Arts CD 8 80992 14514 5 (2008)
