= Harry Neal (disambiguation) =

Harry Neal was a British building company.

Harry Neal or similar may refer to:

- Harry Lee Neal (1929–1968), half of the duo-piano married couple Nelson and Neal
- Harry Neale (born 1937), Canadian NCAA, NHL and WHA coach and general manager, and ice hockey broadcaster
- Harry Burrard Neale (1765–1840), British Royal Navy officer and MP
- Harry Neil (1882–1952), Australian rules footballer
- Harry Neill (1907–1966), Australian rules footballer

== See also ==
- Harold Neal (1897–1972), British Labour Party politician
- Henry Neale (disambiguation)
