= Glass, Aberdeenshire =

Parish in Aberdeenshire, Scotland

Coordinates: 57°26′N 2°58′W

Glass is a parish about 8 miles west of Huntly, Aberdeenshire, Scotland. It is now wholly located in Aberdeenshire but before the reorganisation of Scottish county boundaries in 1891 it was partly in Banffshire. The name Glass may have come from the Gaelic word for "grey," "meadow" or "stream."

Glass had a population of 412 in 1951 and in 793 in 1801.

It has its own school, Glass Primary School and its pupils attend The Gordon Schools, Huntly for their secondary education.

== Notable buildings ==
- List of listed buildings in Glass, Aberdeenshire
- Blairmore House, formerly a school and house belonging to the Family of David Cameron, British Prime Minister. Now a place of retreat and prayer.
- Aswanley house, a mansion, probably built in the 17th century is a Category B listed building. It was being used as a wedding and corporate events and self-catering cottages venue in 2020.
- St. Andrews, the Parish Church of Glass (built or remodelled in 1782) is a Category B listed building. This church was closed in 2007 and was sold to private property owners after April 2011.
- Beldorney Castle (built mid-16th century) is two miles south of Glass and is a Category A listed building.

== Notable residents ==
- The Family of David Cameron. His father Ian Cameron was born at Blairmore House.

== Bibliography ==
- Godsman, James (1970). Glass, Aberdeenshire: the story of a parish. Aberdeen, UK: Alex. P. Reid and Son. ISBN 978-0900961069.
