= Essie Wick Rowland =

- Born: Ester "Essie" Louise Osborn; September 2, 1871; Brooklyn, New York, U.S.
- Died: August 20, 1957 (age 85); Sag Harbor, New York, U.S.
- Resting place: Green-Wood Cemetery
- Other names: Essie Osborn; Essie Wick; Mrs. William Foster Rowland
- Occupations: Socialite; President of the New York City Federation of Women's Clubs, President of Clio
- Spouses: John Wick (m. 1928; div. 1940) William Foster Rowland (m. 1942; died 1976)
- Children: Lillian Wick Neale
- Relatives: Thomas DeWitt Osborn (brother); Henry Osborn (father); Mary Jane Osborn (mother)

Essie Wick Rowland (née Osborn; September 2, 1871 – August 20, 1957) was an American socialite. She was deeply engaged in New York Society as a member and president of numerous society organizations. She supported women's suffrage, poverty alleviation, social causes, and civic engagement. Known socially as "Mrs. William Foster Rowland," her name demanded respect and was prominently featured in New York papers. Her legacy was survived through her daughter and socialite, Lillian Wick Neale (died 1992), and her son-in-law, John Henry Neale II.

== Early life ==
Ester Louise Osborn was born in Brooklyn, New York State to Henry Osborn, a prominent hotelier and political organizer, and Mary Jane Whiteford Osborn in 1870. Her father owned and operated the famous Osborn Hotel, which entertained many athletes and renowned jockeys. The hotel was located in Sheepshead Bay on the water next to a horse racetrack. Henry was an accomplished rower in his youth and the hotel therefore hosted rowers for local regattas as well.

Essie was the oldest of 8 children (3 survived to adulthood). She was raised under privileged circumstances by always being in the company of prominent Brooklyn families, hotel guests, jockeys, and yachtsmen. She grew up during the last few decades that Brooklyn was still an independent city.

Essie attended private school in Brooklyn where she continually received praise for her skills in entertainment. She was known for her elocution, that is performance and speech-giving. In fact, she was noted for her outstanding performance of elocution with the Prima Donna of the Stockholm Grand Opera, Ms. Bertha Wichman.

== Marriage ==
Essie's first husband was John Wick, a prominent New York businessman who ran one of the largest and most successful stove manufacturing businesses in the country—a technology that was at the time cutting edge. They were married in 1897. Essie and John had their one and only child, Lillian Osborn Wick, on September 9, 1898. John suffered from pulmonary troubles and the couple decided to move South to Greenville, SC for a better climate 1901.

Essie and John quickly became entrenched in the upper class of Greenville, South Carolina where they lived in a suite of rooms in Mansion House. They acquired property to begin building an estate and had John's award-winning horse shipped down from New York. Despite hopes of better health in the amiable climate, John's health deteriorated and he died from tuberculosis in 1903.

The widowed Essie was escorted to Washington, DC with her young daughter Lill. From DC, Essie's brother Thomas DeWitt Osborn brought her and Lill back to New York. At the time, Thomas was a rising politician in Brooklyn. Not shorter than a year later, tragedy struck Essie's life again when Thomas was killed in a trolley collision with his horse-drawn carriage. Thomas was returning from a political meeting when he was struck and killed by the trolley. He was the youngest Democratic politician in Brooklyn, a rising powerhouse, and a NYU Law Class of 1901 graduate.

== Second marriage ==
Following the deaths of her father, husband, and brother, Essie focused on raising Lill and continuing her involvement in social causes. She supported the suffragette movement, access to education for disadvantaged children, and social organization of women through clubs. Lill was raised within this polite society environment and attended the Packer Institute in Brooklyn Heights.

Ester Louise Osborn Wick later on, in 1912, married a widower William Foster Rowland. Rowland was involved in New York City millinery business. Three years later she found herself a widow again when her second husband died of a heart attack. Out of two marriages, she was really only a married woman for seven years. Following his death, Essie further entrenched herself in social clubs throughout New York City.

== Society and later life ==
Essie went by Mrs. William Foster Rowland in polite society news coverage. She was respected throughout New York City society as an active socialite, clubwoman, and leader. She ran many club events, charitable charges, and was honored by prominent club leaders. Essie was also known for her fashion, hosting a number of fashion programs through Clio. She was also named one of the 5 best dressed clubwomen in 1933.

In the 1920s, Essie was a member and president of Clio, one of the country's oldest women's clubs.

In 1935, she was elected President of the Women's Federation of New York Clubs.

In 1939, she received the honor of being appointed to the Committee on Women's Participation of the New York World's Fair.

During this time Lill married John Henry Neale II. Essie would spend much of her time with her daughter and son-in-law, and eventually her two grandsons, Thomas DeWitt Neale (named in honor of her brother) and John Henry Neale III. She frequented the Hamptons enjoying the summer season at Red Oaks (estate).

Into old age, Essie continued to give speeches at club events. She lived to see her first few great-grandchildren born before dying in 1957. Essie is buried in Green-Wood Cemetery.
