= Beldorney Castle =

16th century Z-plan castle in Aberdeenshire, Scotland

Coordinates: 57.4161°N 2.9522°W

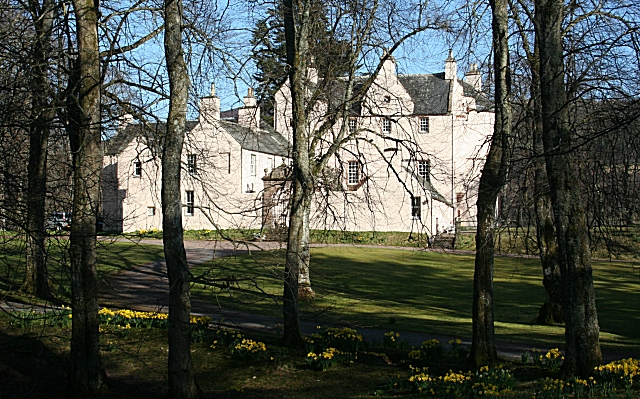
Beldorney Castle

Beldorney Castle is a Z-plan castle dating from the mid-16th century, about two miles south of Glass, in hilly country in the valley of the Deveron, in Aberdeenshire, Scotland.

Alternative names are Beldornie, Beldornay and Beldorny.

== History ==
The property, one of the earliest Z-plan castles in the North-East, has been owned by members of the Ogilvy, Gordon, Lyon, Buchan and Grant families.

In 1545 George Gordon purchased the land from the Earl of Huntly, and the castle was built before he died in 1575. Two wings were built to the west in 1679, while the original entrance was replaced. The castle was acquired by Alexander Gordon in 1713, and he remodelled it, including first-floor rooms formed from the hall, which have since been removed. An interesting wall painting of a woman playing the lute was among paintings discovered during this restoration. The work included introducing bolection-moulded chimney pieces and coved ceilings.

Thomas Buchan of Auchmacoy bought the Beldorney estate in 1807 from Charles Gordon of Wardhouse, the last of the line of Gordons of Beldorney. Buchan sold the castle and estate to Sir William Grant, Master of the Rolls and MP for Banffshire. On his death it passed to his brother, Major John Grant of Dawlish, Devon.

In 1830 a north wing was added. Subsequently, there has been restoration work in 1890, remodelling other floors under the supervision of Alexander Marshall Mackenzie, and in the early 1980s.

== Structure ==
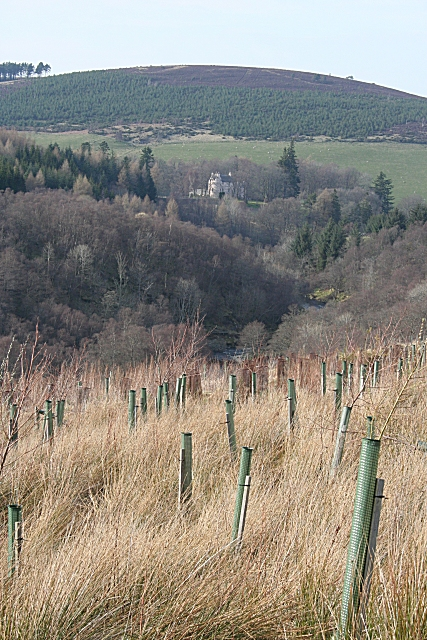
Beldorney Castle

The main block of the castle lies north to south. At the north-west angle is a smaller square tower, which contains the main stair, named the Dog Tower, and having a dog finial.

At the south-east angle is a large drum tower, which has a rounded gable. The original entry was in the re-entrant angle with the square tower.

The basement, which contains a kitchen and two cellars, is vaulted. From one of the cellars – the wine cellar – a mural stair led to the hall. Fragments of the painting of the Hall ceiling survive. It appears that the second floor also had a hall and a tower room. There is a mural stair in the turret in the re-entrant angle of the south gable; this gave access to the second floor room and the third-floor watch room.

The two 1679 wings to the west enclose a courtyard, the entrance to which is an arched gateway, marked with the initials of John Gordon and Anne, and the date, on the inner side. It has renaissance detail, a semicircular tympanum above entablature with ball finials. The south wing is a single-storey high.

The replacement entrance, decorated with an ogee-headed panel containing a winged angel's head, is in the centre of the west face.

It is a category A listed building.
