= Blairmore School =

Coordinates: 57.4456°N 2.9403°W

- Glass, Huntly, Aberdeenshire; Scotland

Information
- Type: Private; Boarding school
- Motto: Capta Majora (Latin: "Strive for better things")
- Established: 1947
- Closed: 1993
- Gender: Co-educational
- Age: 8 to 13
- Colour: Navy blue

Blairmore School was an independent boarding preparatory school in Glass near Huntly, Aberdeenshire until its closure in 1993. The site is now owned and used by a Christian organisation called Ellel Ministries International as a prayer, training and healing retreat centre.

== History ==
Blairmore School was established in 1947 as an independent prep school for boys aged 8–13 by Colonel D.R. Ainslie D.S.O., B.A., a keen educationalist, Cambridge graduate and retired Seaforth Highlander. The school turned co-ed in 1975 and closed in 1993.

Blairmore had its own tartan.

== Former pupils ==
- Ken Ballantyne (1940–2016), Scottish athlete.
- Malcolm Sinclair, 20th Earl of Caithness (born 1948), Conservative politician.
- Grenville Johnston (born 1945), accountant and Lord Lieutenant of Moray.
- David Sole (born 1962), Scottish rugby union captain.

== Blairmore House ==
Blairmore House, the former school's premises, is a Victorian country house set amid 50 acres (200,000 m^{2}) of park and woodland beside the River Deveron, 6 miles (9.7 km) from Huntly, 40 miles (64 km) from Aberdeen and 60 miles (97 km) from Inverness. The house was designed by the architect Alexander Marshall Mackenzie and was built in 1884 as a private house for Alexander Geddes, a wealthy businessman and great-great grandfather of the former British Prime Minister David Cameron. Cameron's father, Ian Donald Cameron, born in 1932, is incorrectly said to have been born in Blairmore House. Geddes made his fortune in Chicago in the US in the trading of grain in the 1850s, and a safe belonging to him which survived the Great Fire of Chicago was installed in the house's Billiard Room.

During the Second World War the house served as GHQ Home Forces for some of the auxiliary units based in Aberdeenshire and had a training area within the grounds of the house and nearby land. Auxunit Patrols was a special force consisting of between six and eight men trained in the utmost secrecy to a high standard. In the event of a German invasion, they would go to ground and carry out a clandestine war against the occupying forces.

After the school's closure, Blairmore House was run as a private hunting lodge for several years. The building is now used as a prayer and intercession training school and retreat centre run by an evangelical Christian group called Ellel Ministries.

Blairmore House is a Category C listed building.

== See also ==
- Cademuir International School
- Oxenfoord Castle School
- Rannoch School
- St Margaret's School, Edinburgh
- Blairmore Holdings
