= Essie Weingarten =

American businessperson (born 1949)

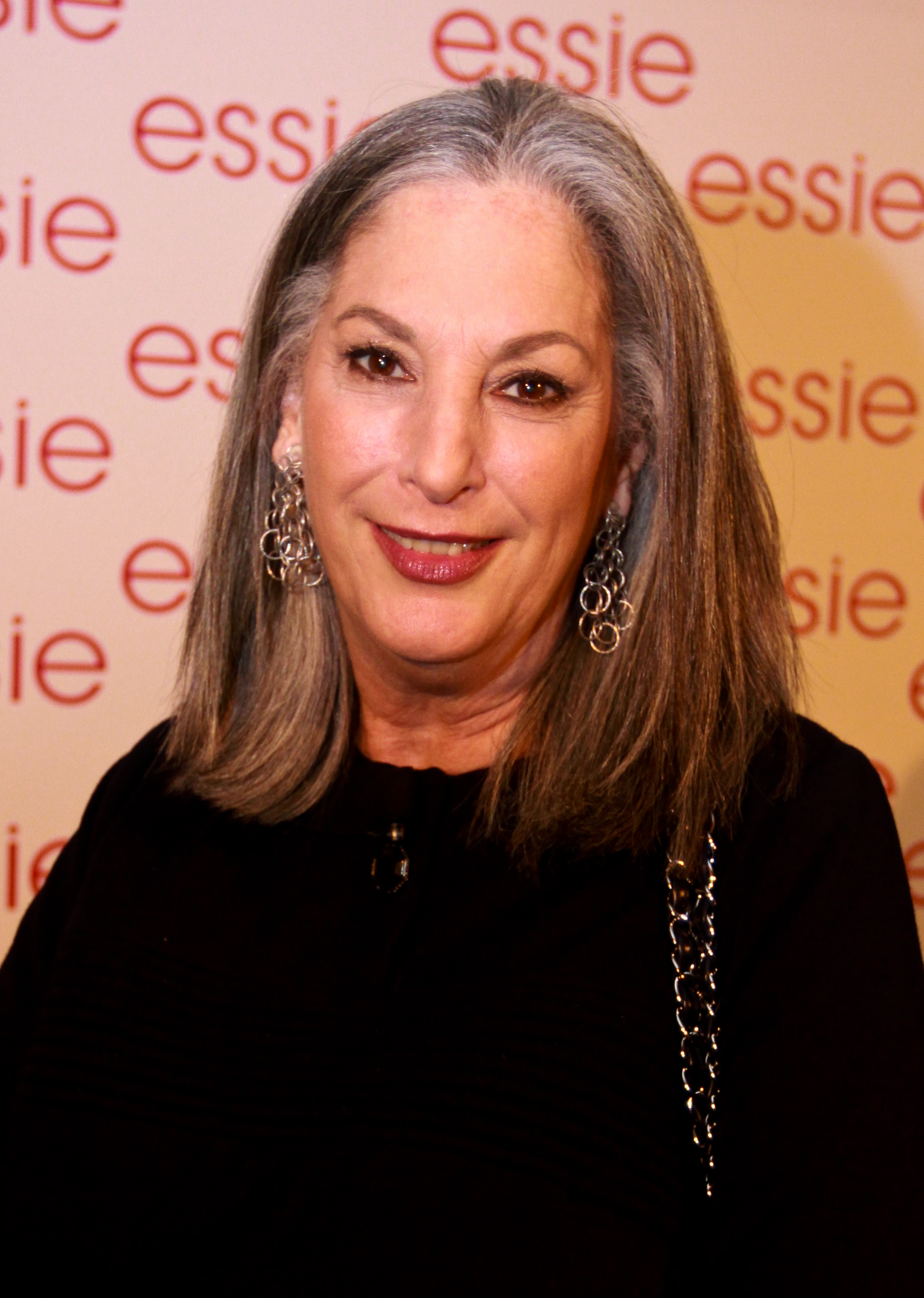
- Born: 1949 (age 76–77)
- Occupation: Founder
- Years active: 1981–present
- Organization(s): Essie Cosmetics, Ltd.

Essie Weingarten is the founder of Essie Cosmetics, Ltd., branded as essie, a major American nail polish brand.

Weingarten, born in 1949, began her career in the cosmetics industry in 1981 when she premiered 12 fashion nail polish colors in Las Vegas, Nevada. She then began distributing her polishes to many salons across the country, and then internationally through distributors in several countries. The company was sold to L'Oreal in 2010.
