= Dunbennan =

Area in Aberdeenshire, Scotland

Coordinates: 57.45406°N 2.82671°W

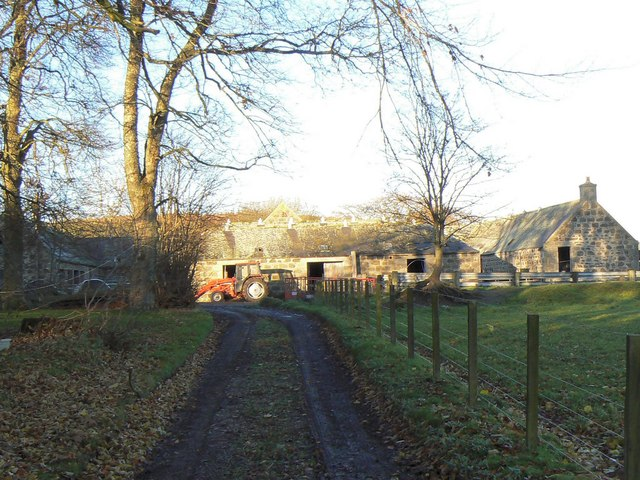
Dunbennan Farm in 2006

Dunbennan is a settlement near Huntly, Aberdeenshire, Scotland. The name comes from the Gaelic dun-beinnean, or the fort of the little hill, and originally denoted what is now Dunbennan Hill.

Prior to 1727 it was the name of an extensive parish that stretched from Lower Gordonsburn to Huntly. In that year it was united with neighbouring Kinoir and the combined parish was renamed Huntly, after the seat of the Gordon chiefs of the area. The centre of the parish developed into the modern town of that name.

A church of Dunbennan was mentioned in a document from 1226.

David Tulloch, the tenant of Dunbennan, led 100 men from the surrounding area of Strathbogie in the Jacobite risings of 1715 and 1745.
