= Hamish Fulton =

British photographer (born 1946)

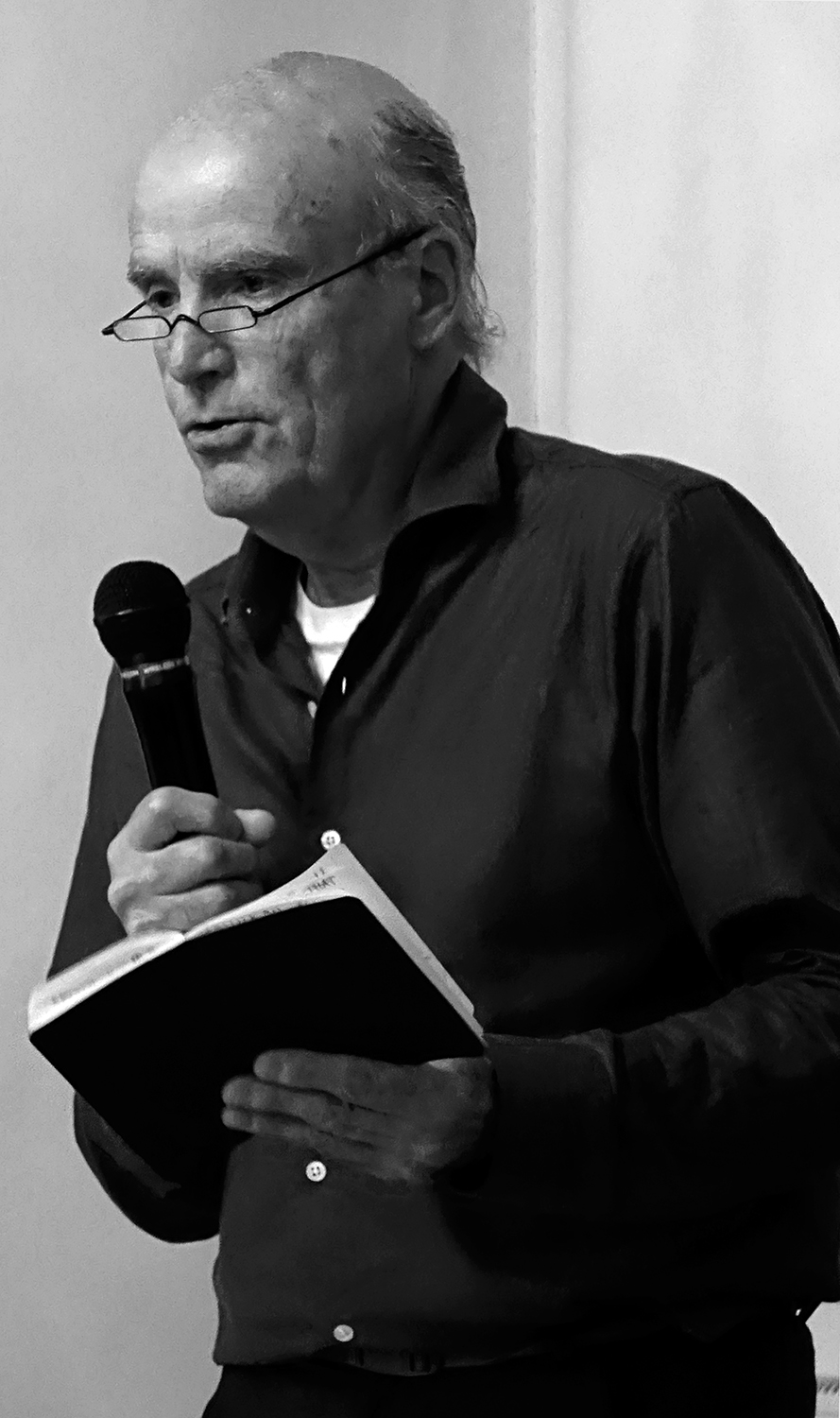
Hamish Fulton

Hamish Fulton (born 1946) is an English walking artist. Since 1972 he has only made works based on the experience of walks. He translates his walks into a variety of media, including photography, illustrations, and wall texts. His work is contained in major museums' collections, such as the Tate Britain and MoMA. Since 1994 he has been creating group walks for the public. Fulton argues that "walking is an artform in its own right" and argues for wider acknowledgement of walking art.

== Biography ==
He first attended the art foundation course at Hammersmith College of Art. With help from a tutor (David Hall) he was accepted straight into the advanced course at Saint Martin's School of Art, London, 1966–68, and the following year studied at the Royal College of Art, London. He started creating walks while at Saint Martin's, including a group walk in 1967 from the front of the school out into the countryside.

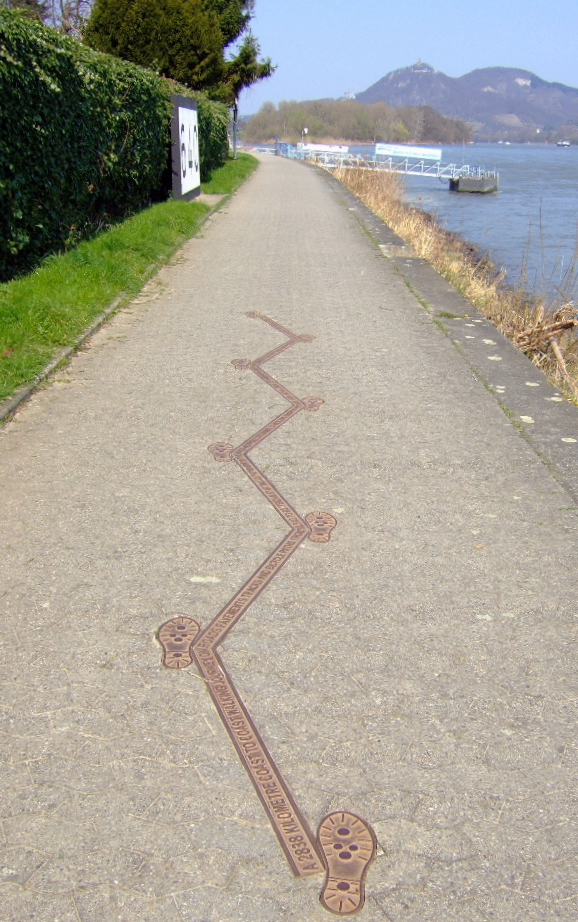
Hamish Fulton: “seven paces” (2003)

Fulton follows a leave no trace ethic, and does not collect materials on his walks for display in galleries. Instead, his work combines text-based descriptions with a photograph, illustration, or, more recently, vinyl wall texts, to communicate his walks to viewers in a gallery. Fulton has stated that walking is an experience not an art medium, and that what he builds is an experience, not a sculpture. More recently, Fulton has referred to his walks as 'invisible objects' and has discussed his group walks as artworks that are created and observed by the participants. Fulton has emphasised the political aspects of his work, particularly in concern to the situation in Tibet and the degradation of the environment.

In 1994, Fulton experimented with the creation of group walks while working side-by-side with Marina Abramović at CCA Kitakyushu. He has created a variety of group walks since, including Slowalk (in Support of Ai Weiwei) (2011) in the Turbine Hall at the Tate Modern to bring attention to the restrictions on artist Ai Weiwei's freedom of travel and artistic production. In 2002 he worked with artist Christine Quoiraud on a series of group walks in France.^{:59} Since working with Quoiraud, Fulton has adopted her style of equi-spaced walking during his group walks.

In 2010, Deveron Projects commissioned Fulton to create 21 Days in the Cairngorms, which included two group walks in Huntly, Scotland.^{:55}^{:3} This project continued Fulton's engagement with the Cairngorms, where he previously created a number of walking works, and resulted in the book Mountain Time, Human Time (2010). Claudia Zeiske, the director of Deveron Projects until 2020, cites Fulton as the inspiration for the establishment of The Walking Institute, which has continued to develop artistic projects based in walking.^{:3}

== Solo exhibitions ==
- Hamish Fulton - A Walking Artist (2023) Frac Sud, Marseille, France
- Hamish Fulton - A Decision to Choose Only Walking (2016) Galerie Tschudi - Zuoz, Zuoz, Switzerland
- Hamish Fulton: Wells of Dee (2015) Galleri Riis, Stockholm, Sweden
- Walking Transformation (2014) Villa Merkel, Esslingen Am Neckar, Germany

== Publications ==
- Hamish Fulton (2010) Mountain Time, Human Time. Charta: Milano.
- Fulton, H. (2012) Walking in Relation to Everything. Ikon Gallery: Birmingham.
- Hamish Fulton (2000) Magpie: Two River Walks. Lethbridge: Southern Alberta Art Gallery.
- Hamish Fulton (2000b) Wild Life: a Walk in the Cairngorms. Edinburgh: Pocketbooks.
- Camp Fire. Stedelijk Van Abbemuseum, Eindhoven. (1985) ISBN 90-70149-11-7
- Hamish Fulton (1977) Nine Works 1969 - 1973. London: Robert Self.
