= Anthony Schrag =

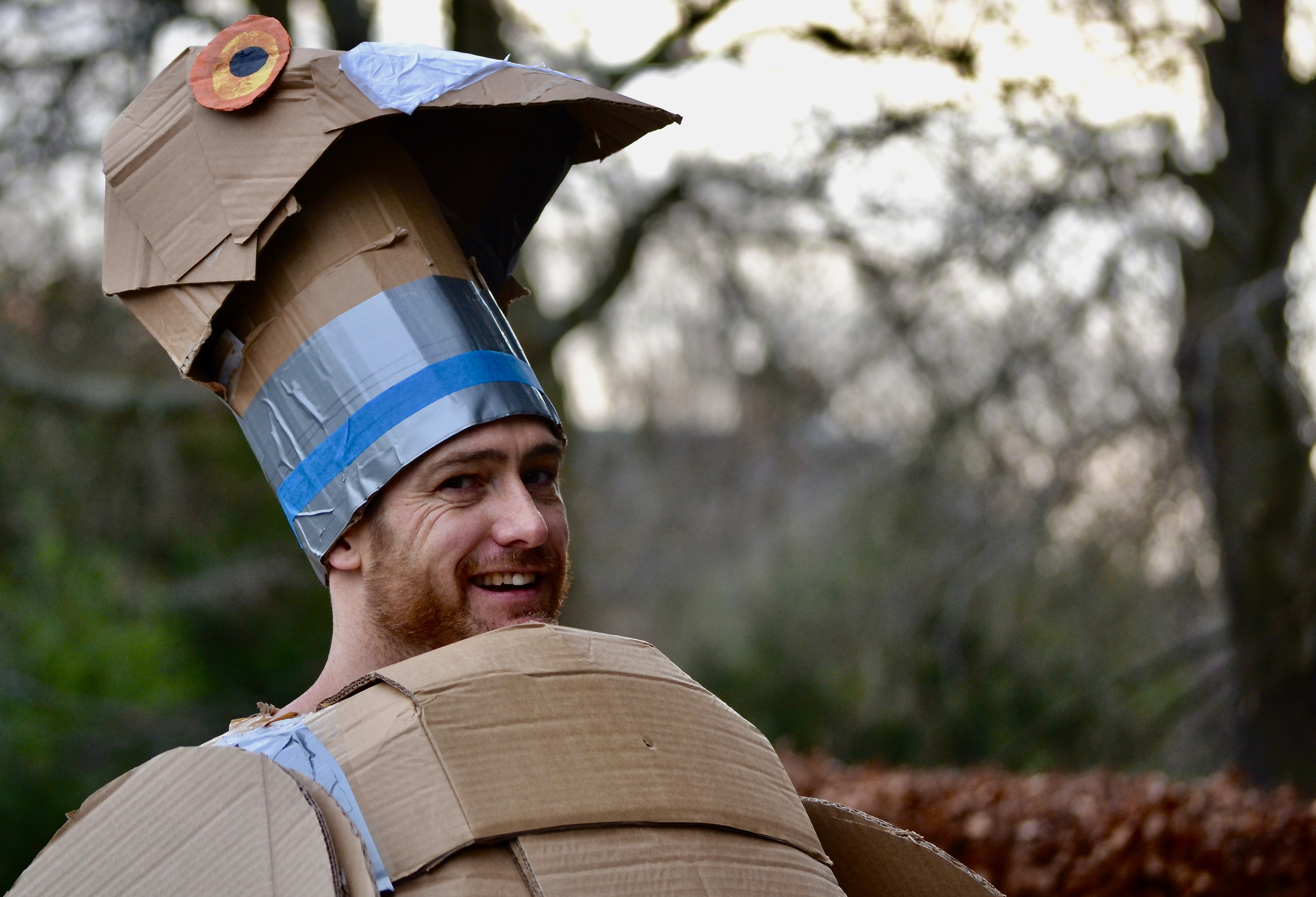
- Born: 1975; Zimbabwe
- Education: University of British Columbia, Glasgow School of Art, Newcastle University
- Known for: Socially engaged art, institutional critique, performance
- Website: www.anthonyschrag.com

Anthony Schrag is an artist and academic based in Scotland whose work and research examines participatory practices in art.

== Early life and education ==
Schrag was born in Zimbabwe in 1975 and grew up in a number of countries including Canada, the Middle East and the UK. Schrag studied creative writing at the University of British Columbia in Canada, then went on to study Fine Art at Glasgow School of Art in 2005. In 2016 Schrag submitted his PhD thesis Agonistic Tendencies: The role of conflict within institutionally supported participatory practices, which was subsequently awarded the degree by Newcastle University. Schrag is currently a lecturer at Queen Margaret University, Edinburgh, as well as being an independent artist and practitioner.

== Work ==
Schrag's art practice is participatory. In 2015 Schrag spent three months walking from Aberdeen to Venice, known as 'The Lure of the Lost,' what he termed a 'modern day pilgrimage.' The walk was commissioned by Deveron Projects to coincide with the 2015 Venice Biennale, and was intended to highlight the Biennale's position as the most 'sacred' location in the art world and what it means to be excluded from it.

== Awards ==
Schrag was a 2010 Artist-in-Residence at the McColl Center for Art + Innovation in Charlotte, NC. He has received a number of grants and awards for his work from institutions such as Creative Scotland and the British Council, as well as the Dewar Arts Award, the 2011 Standpoint Futures: Public residency award, and a Henry Moore Artist Fellowship.
