= John Henry Neale II =

- Born: April 15, 1896; New York City
- Died: April 18, 1961 (aged 64); Sag Harbor, New York
- Occupation: American President of the Ellerman Lines Steamship Co.
- Spouse: Lillian Osborn Wick
- Children: Thomas DeWitt Neale, John Henry Neale III

Henry's notable role in the New York City shipping industry.

John "Henry" Neale II (April 15, 1896 – August 18, 1961) was a U.S. shipping executive and New York society man.

J. Henry Neale was born in New York City in 1896 to John Henry Neale Sr. and Hilda Peterson. His mother died in 1903 when he was 6 years old. That same year, Henry's father, John H. Neale I remarried Miss Emily R. Jones. Henry grew to have a strained relationship with his father and step-mother, moving out to live with his grandmother Elizabeth Aldridge (Elizabeth Clara Blunt Neale Aldridge). The widowed Mrs. Aldridge was John Neale I's mother who had remarried a Tiffany & Co. watchmaker. Henry was raised in Manhattan.

Henry served during World War I. After the war, he met Lillian Osborn Wick while entertaining in the same social circles of Brooklyn Society. Lill attended Packer Collegiate Institute for formal schooling and was the daughter of Society Woman Essie Wick Rowland and Andrew Wick, a businessman. Henry and Lill married in 1923. The wedding was held at St. Bartholomew's Episcopal Church (Manhattan).

After serving in WW1, Henry began working at the Ellerman Lines British shipping company in the New York City office. He quickly moved up to become the American Director of the company. During his tenure, Henry traveled many times across the Atlantic to London to conduct business. He became socialized with the leadership of the Lloyd's of London and members of Parliament. His reputation grew in American trading and shipping circles—notably, he was a member of the Whitehall Club and dined with Winston Churchill.

Henry and Lill settled into Larchmont, NY where they continued to entertain New York company as well as raise their two sons, Thomas and John. In their free time, the family enjoyed civic engagement, golf, tennis, and sailing. Henry became the President of the Larchmont Yacht Club. The family summered in Maine until Henry purchased an estate in the Hamptons from Frank Case. This estate would become Henry's full-time home after he retired. Out in Sag Harbor he enjoyed membership with the local yacht clubs and served as Mayor. Henry and his wife spent their winters in Florida at the Breakers Hotel.

Both his sons married and had children. John Henry Neale III's wedding reception was held at the Plaza Hotel.

J. Henry Neale died on his Hamptons estate in Sag Harbor, New York in 1961. He is buried in Green-Wood Cemetery in Brooklyn, NY.

His wife, Lill, managed the estate for another 30 years hosting social events and their 6 grand kids every summer.

== Recognition ==
- President of Ellerman Lines
- President of Larchmont Yacht Club
- Mayor of Sag Harbor
- Leadership in Free Masons
