= Essie Sakhai =

Iranian businessman

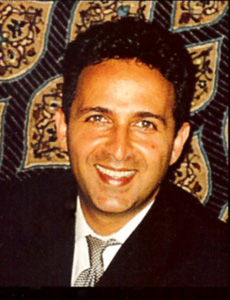
- Born: Tehran, Iran
- Occupations: Businessman, Art Dealer, Author
- Website: https://www.essiecarpets.com

Essie Sakhai (born in Tehran, Iran and educated in Great Britain) is an Iranian businessman and one of the world's foremost experts, collectors and dealers of the ancient Iranian art form of the Persian and Oriental Carpets and Rugs. Born to a family with a long history of dealing in Persian Carpets dating nine generations, he gained much of his knowledge from his father Benayahoo Sakhai. Essie is the founder of Essie Carpets, based in Mayfair London, which holds one of the world's most comprehensive and finest collections of Persian and Oriental carpets and rugs.

Essie is the author of three books in which he shares his extensive knowledge on the subject of Persian and Oriental carpets; The Story of Carpets (1991), Oriental Carpets: A Buyer's Guide (1995), and Persian Rugs and Carpets: The Fabric of Life (2007).

Essie spends most of his time at his galleries situated in London's Mayfair, carrying on the family tradition started in 1766. Essie advises museums, royal families and private collectors.

== Books ==
Sakhai is the author of three books on carpets:

- 1991: The Story of Carpets. Princess House, London: Studio Editions Ltd. ISBN 1-55921-203-9, ISBN 978-1-55921-203-8. ASIN 1559212039
  - French language edition: Mysteres des Tapis D'Orient. Paris: Librairie Gründ. ISBN 2-7000-2220-3.
- 1995: Oriental Carpets: A Buyer's Guide. Kingston: Moyer Bell. ISBN 1-55921-146-6, ISBN 978-1-55921-146-8. ASIN 1559211466
- 2008: Persian Rugs and Carpets: The Fabric of Life. Antique Collectors Club. ISBN 185149507X, ISBN 978-1851495078.
