= Jacques Coetzer =

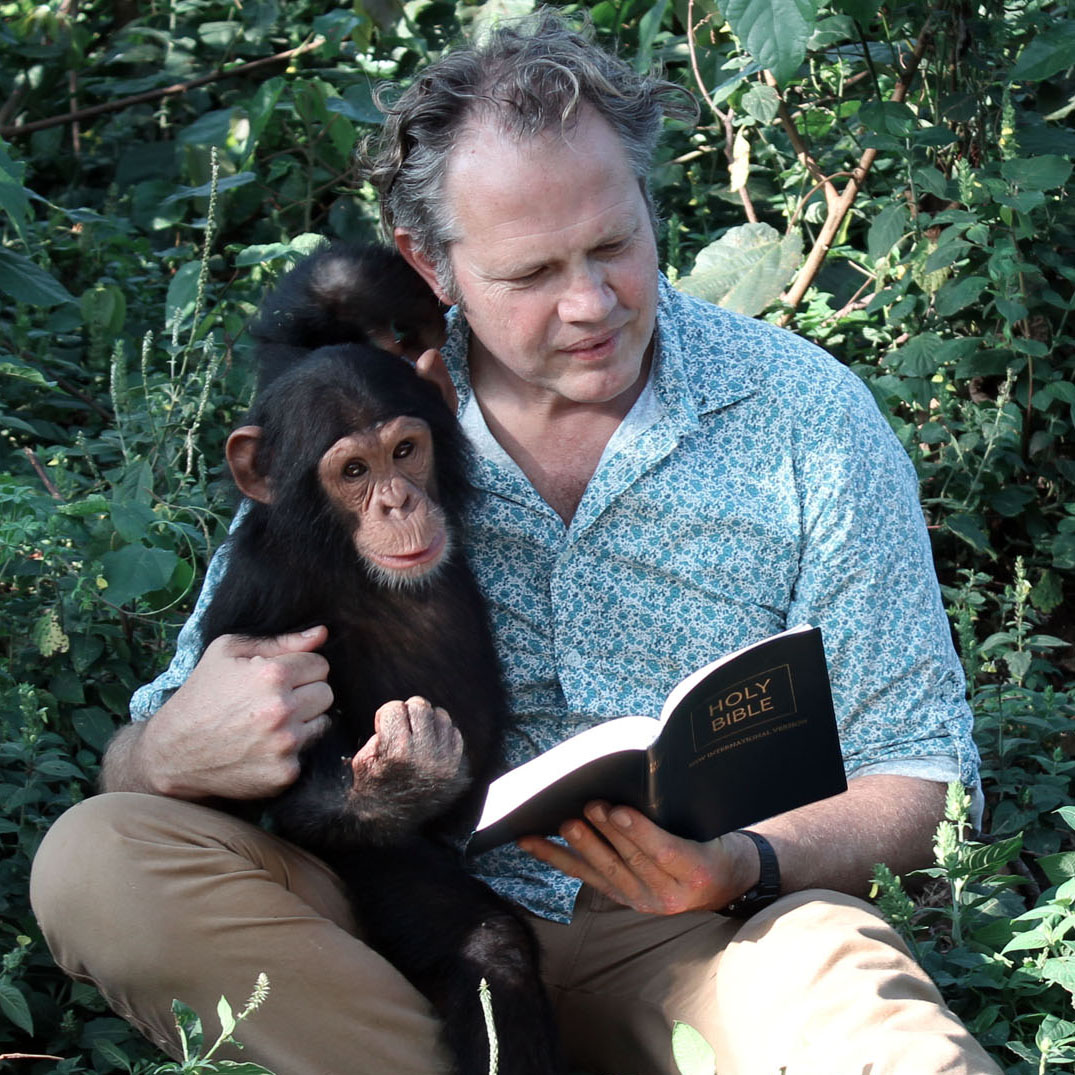
- Jacques Coetzer reading Genesis 1 with chimpanzee, Uganda, 2013
- Born: 1968 (age 57–58); Kimberley, Northern Cape, South Africa
- Known for: Sculpture, New Media
- Website: www.jacquescoetzer.co.za

Jacques Coetzer (born 1968) is an alt pop artist, based in South Africa. His conceptual approach fuses traditional and new media; social engagement is a key part of his practice and his projects often invite public participation. Over a span of two decades his art has evolved from sculptural object making to an action-based approach. Much of Jacques Coetzer's art employs artistic gesture, musical performance and public intervention, which he documents with photographs and video. Recent work has explored climate change philosophy and our shared relationship with nature and the environment. Coetzer works in East Africa and the United Kingdom, with Cape Town, South Africa being his primary base.

== Career ==
=== Education ===
Coetzer received a BA in Fine Art from University of Pretoria in 1991 and studied New Media in Groningen, The Netherlands, in 1997.

=== Exhibitions ===
- DADA South? at IZIKO South African National Gallery, Cape Town, 2010
- Spier Contemporary, Stellenbosch, 2007
- Weekend Cathedral, Peacock Visual Arts, Aberdeen, Scotland, 2010

== Notable works ==
=== Blood Fountain ===
Red pigment in the water of Strijdom Square, Pretoria, 29 September 1992
