= Cairnie =

Coordinates: 57.48°N 02.86°W

- Location within Aberdeenshire
- OS grid reference: NJ4844
- Council area: Aberdeenshire
- Lieutenancy area: Aberdeenshire
- Country: Scotland
- Sovereign state: United Kingdom
- Police: Scotland
- Fire: Scottish
- Ambulance: Scottish
- UK Parliament: Gordon and Buchan
- Scottish Parliament: Aberdeenshire West

Cairnie, also written Cairney, (Scottish Gaelic: Càrnaidh/A' Chàrnaich) is a village in Aberdeenshire, Scotland.

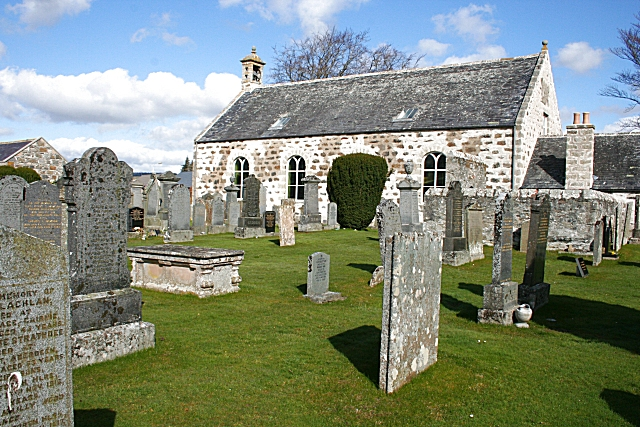
St Martin's Kirk

It is in the district of Huntly. It has a primary school, Cairney Primary School.
