= Huntly =

Town in Aberdeenshire, Scotland

Coordinates: 57.446°N 2.788°W

Huntly: Scottish Gaelic: Srath Bhalgaidh or Hunndaidh
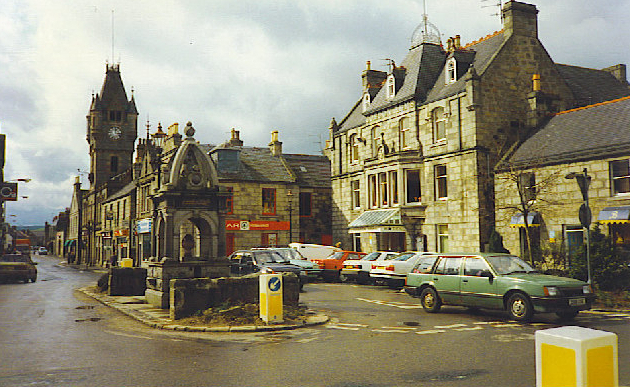
- Gordon Square, Huntly

- Location within Aberdeenshire
- Population: 4,550 (2020)
- OS grid reference: NJ5353
- Council area: Aberdeenshire
- Country: Scotland
- Sovereign state: United Kingdom
- Post town: HUNTLY
- Postcode district: AB54
- Dialling code: 01466
- Police: Scotland
- Fire: Scottish
- Ambulance: Scottish
- UK Parliament: Gordon and Buchan
- Scottish Parliament: Aberdeenshire West

Huntly (Scottish Gaelic: Srath Bhalgaidh or Hunndaidh) is a town in Aberdeenshire, Scotland, formerly known as Milton of Strathbogie or simply Strathbogie. It had a population of 4,460 in 2004 and is the site of Huntly Castle. Its neighbouring settlements include Keith and Rothiemay. Both Huntly and the surrounding district of Gordon are named for a town and family that originated in the Border country.

Huntly is the historic home of the Gordon Highlanders regiment, which traditionally recruited throughout the North-East of Scotland. Huntly has a primary school (Gordon Primary) and a secondary school (The Gordon Schools) beside Huntly Castle.

Four of the owls from the local falconry centre were featured in the Harry Potter films.

== History ==
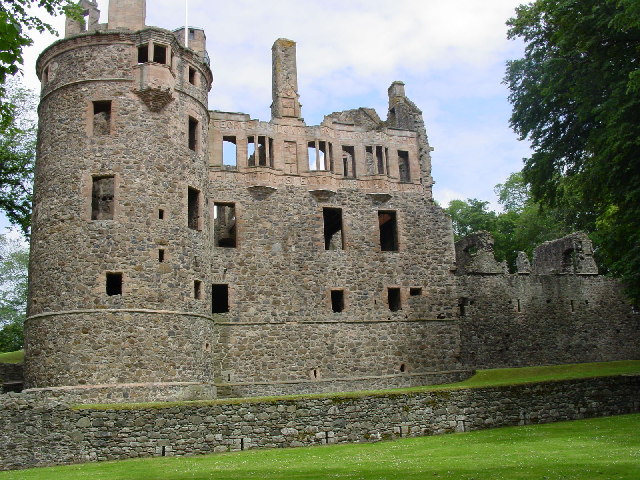
Huntly Castle

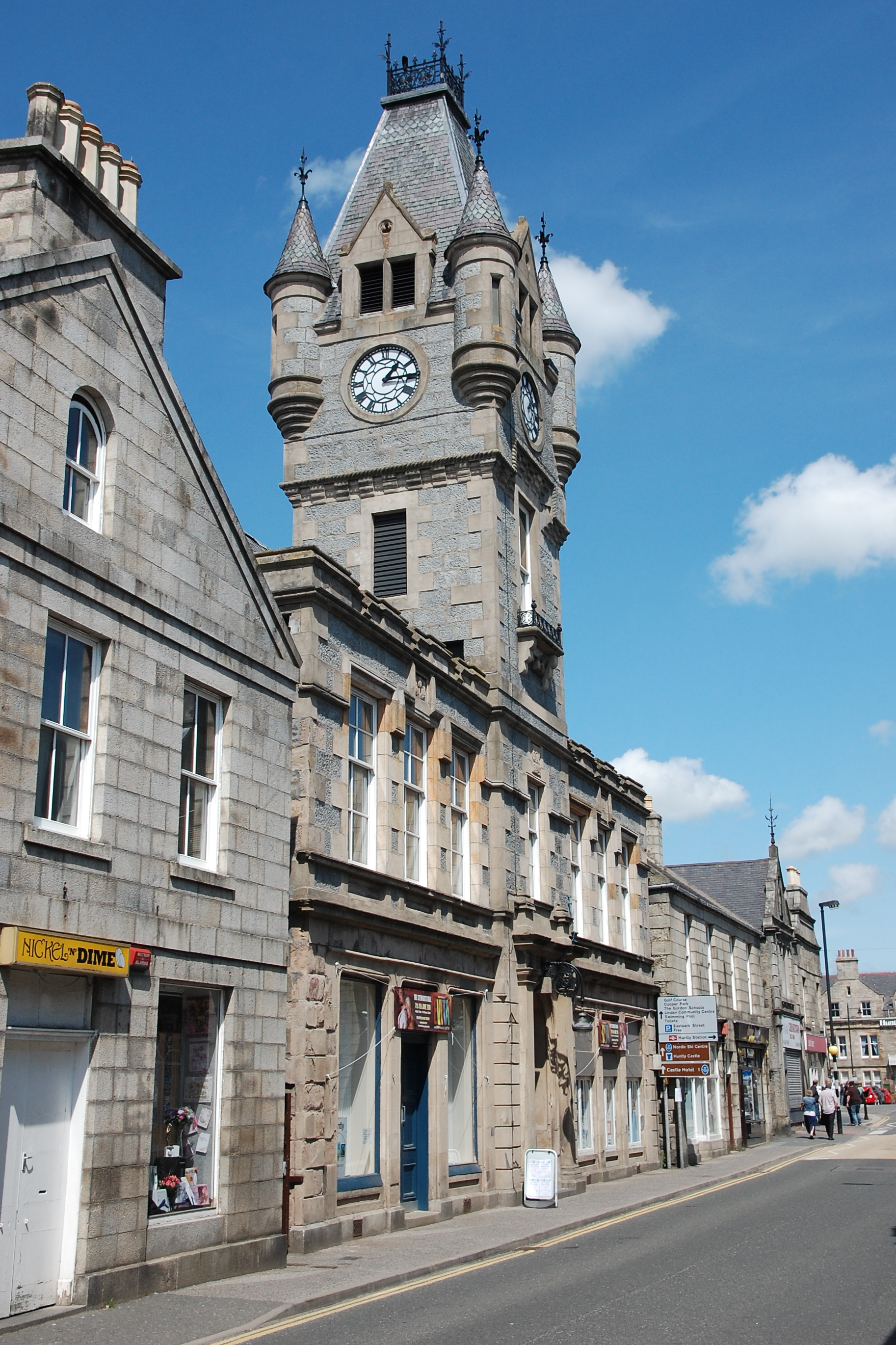
Stewart's Hall, formerly known as Huntly Town Hall

Settlement around the confluence of the Bogie and Deveron rivers dates back to the Neolithic period. The settlement's remains and the remains of an Iron Age hillfort have been excavated on Battlehill on the outskirts of the town. During the first millennium CE the area was dominated by the Pictish culture. A very large Pictish settlement and vitrified hillfort was situated locally at Tap o' Noth in Strathbogie.

The site was strategically important, allowing for control of the routes from Moray into Strathdon and Deeside. The first motte-and-bailey castle on this settlement was erected by Donnchadh II, Earl of Fife, the Gaelic speaking 2nd Mormaer of Fife, c.1180. The lands were transferred to the Berwickshire Anglo-Norman family, the Gordons, in 1352 in retaliation for MacDuff’s descendant, David of Strathbogie, defecting from Robert I to Edward II’s cause on the eve of the Battle of Bannockburn.

The settlement at the confluence of the Bogie and the Deveron was known as Milton of Strathbogie or The Raws of Strathbogie until 1508.

Despite the boggy lands in the vicinity at that time, the castle at Strathbogie became a key centre for the Gordons of Moray over the following centuries. As the family built power through warfare and dynastic marriage, they became the dominant family in the North-East of Scotland, with the clan chief acquiring the informal title of Cock o' the North. As a result, a thriving settlement serving the evolving palace complex developed. The settlement became a burgh of barony in 1472. In 1508, the Gordons received a royal charter enabling them to rename Milton of Strathbogie & the castle to Huntly – the name of their ancestral seat in Berwickshire.

During the Scottish Reformation, the Gordons were among the leading Catholic families in the country and heavily embroiled in Mary, Queen of Scots’ conflict with the reformed church and the protestant magnates. Huntly castle was bombarded and sacked in 1562 (by Mary) and in 1594 by James VI.

After the restoration of Gordon titles, the town continued to develop during the 17th and 18th centuries both as a market town and an adjunct to the Gordons’ palace with a wide range of merchants and artisans serving the surrounding countryside – in the mid-17th century the town hosted 4 separate glovers.

The adjacent parishes of Dunbennan and Kinnoir were consolidated into a single parish of Huntly in 1727, though each of these livings had been in the gift of the Marquess of Huntly for centuries. During this century, the Duke of Gordon also commenced redeveloping the town as a planned-town with grid-iron streets.

The 18th centuries saw the development of the flax industry and associated cottage industries in heckling, spinning, bleaching and weaving, though the trade was inhibited in the longer term by poor transport infrastructure to Banff and Aberdeen. Smuggling whisky was also an important trade at this period until the industry was licensed in 1823.

In the 19th century, following the post-Napoleonic slump in the linen trade, the town experienced another period of growth with the establishment of rail transport in 1845 coupled with a shift from peasant farming to capitalist agriculture. Huntly became an important market and shipping centre whilst its surrounding parishes depopulated.

In 1836 the town and the Gordon estates passed to the Sussex-based 5th Duke of Richmond by inheritance. Ownership of the feu and much of the land and property remained in the ownership of the Dukes of Richmond and Gordon until August 1936 when all the property and feus in the town along with much surrounding farmland was sold at auction at Huntly Town Hall in order to pay death duties on the ducal estates.

Though the town’s population has varied slightly over the 20th century – with a net outward migration after the 2nd World War – the town in 2018 had a population of 4,650. This compares with 4,229 in 1911. Significant demographic growth was over the course of the 19th century from 1000 in 1800 to 3,600 in 1861.

== Arts ==
Huntly is home to Deveron Projects, an arts organisation that invites artists from all over the world to come and live and work in the town. Since 1995 it has worked with a 'town is the venue' methodology, connecting artists, communities and places. It hosts artists and projects that explore local, regional and global topics, such as forestry, geology, botany, foraging, anthropology, history, politics and art. Over 100 renowned artists have spent time in the town, including Roman Signer and Hamish Fulton.

Walking is often used as a medium to bring people together for these projects, and Deveron Projects has a Walking Institute that commissions artists to make walks. Their annual Slow Marathon started in 2012 in collaboration with Ethiopian artist Mihret Kebede. Deveron Projects also runs a community kitchen and gardening projects. In 2013 Deveron Projects won Huntly the Creative Place Award, which recognises 'creativity across Scotland’s smaller communities'.

== Geography ==
Brown Hill is located in Huntly parish.

== Sports ==
The local rugby union side is Huntly RFC.

Huntly is the home town of professional darts player John Henderson.

== Transport ==
Huntly railway station is a railway station serving the town. The station is managed by ScotRail and is on the Aberdeen to Inverness Line. The station opened on 20 September 1854.

== Notable people ==
- Rod J. Allan (born 1943), Scottish-Canadian geologist and geochemist, born and raised in Huntly.
- Frederick Burwell (1846–1915), architect active in New Zealand and Australia from 1871 to 1908, born in Huntly
- Ian Cameron (1932–2010), father of British Prime Minister, David Cameron, was from Glass, Huntly; he was born at Blairmore House
- Ronald Center (1913–1973), composer, lived there from 1943 until his death in 1973
- Willie Donald (1953–2022), cricketer
- Iona Fyfe (born 1998), Scots singer and musician
- Elizabeth Gordon, Duchess of Gordon (née Brodie; 1794 – 1864), was a Scottish noblewoman and church patron
- Kirstie Gordon, international cricketer for both England and Scotland, born and raised in Huntly, where she first played cricket.
- John Henderson (born 1973), a PDC darts player, is from Huntly
- James Legge (1815–1897), scholar and missionary to China, was born in Huntly and educated there
- George MacDonald (1824–1905), writer
- William Milne (1785–1822), born at Kennethmont near Huntly, missionary to China where he founded Ying Wa College
- George Philip, (1800–1882), a cartographer and founder of the publishing house George Philip & Son Ltd, was born in Huntly
- John Perie (1831–1874), recipient of the Victoria Cross, born in Huntly
- Jo Pitt (1979-2013), para-equestrian
- Andrew Young (born 1992), cross-country skier
- William Mellis Christie (1829–1900), founder of the Canadian Mr. Christie brand of cookies and biscuits
