= Walkwalkwalk =

British Artist Collective

Walkwalkwalk (2005–2010) is a British artist collective consisting of Gail Burton, Serena Korda and Clare Qualmann. Based in London, their work focused on routine walks in the Bethnal Green neighborhood of East London, as well as overlooked and forgotten spaces. Through their work they looked to create a new "'archaeology of the familiar and the forgotten' in London's East End".^{:50} Scholars have discussed walkwalkwalk's works in a variety of contexts, including psychogeography, walking as an artistic medium, Live Art, and criminology.

== Formation and practice ==
walkwalkwalk was formed in 2005, when Burton, Korda and Qualmann were "looking for a way to create artistic work that didn't require a budget or institutional affiliation."^{:50} walkwalkwalk work across a variety of media, but all of their works are "linked through the practice of walking and the invitation to go on a walk".^{:53} This includes group walks, walking instructions, flyposting, maps, and films. As Mike Collier describes it, 'walkwalkwalk drift through the streets of Bethnal Green collecting stories and objects, creating a narrative of place.'^{:88} In particular, they are known for their series of Nightwalks (2005-2010),^{:14} which took groups on nighttime walks to "selected spots . . . that do not really have any reason to exist",^{:55} and their walk between fish and chip shops in London.

Their work is closely linked with the Situationist concept of psychogeography, and particularly the practices of détournement and dérive. Scholars, however, have pointed out how it subverts many of psychogeography's common tropes. Deirdre Heddon and Cathy Turner refer to their work as "a sort of anti-dérive", noting that walkwalkwalk "consciously détourn Debord’s expression of outrage [over the limited triangle of movement most people inhabit] by specifically mapping their own daily routes to define a triangle: ‘rather than diverging from it we decided we would explore relationships within it'". Likewise, Blake Morris contrasts their "resolutely local explorations" with the type of epic walks "typified by literary psychogeographer Iain Sinclar's [ . . . ] exploration of the M25 motorway".^{:51}

Scholars have highlighted how their work centers the experiences of women, who are often excluded from histories of and discussions around walking. As Morris notes, walkwalkwalk's works "gave precedence to . . . the experience of women walking through the city".^{:51} Likewise, Lizzie Seal and Maggie O'Niell use it as an example of how artistic walking practices could be applied to sociological and criminological research and practices, identifying their work as an "urban and micropolitical transgression challenging and resisting gendered norms".^{:14}

== Selected exhibitions ==
- Chip Shop Tour of E8 (2007), E8- The Heart of Hackney, Transition Gallery, London
- Nightwalks (2008), Stories from the Exeter Archive
- walk walk walk: stories from the Bethnal Green archive (2010), a permanent installation in the Bethnal Green Old Town Hall.
- walk walk walk (2013), Walk On: 40 Years of Walking, Pitshangar Manor Gallery, Northern Gallery of Contemporary Art, mac Birmingham, Plymouth City Museum and Gallery

== Selected publications ==
- Gail Burton, Serena Korda, and Clare Qualmann (2009) Walkwalkwalk: Stories from the Exeter Archive. London: Site Projects.
