= Artsadmin =

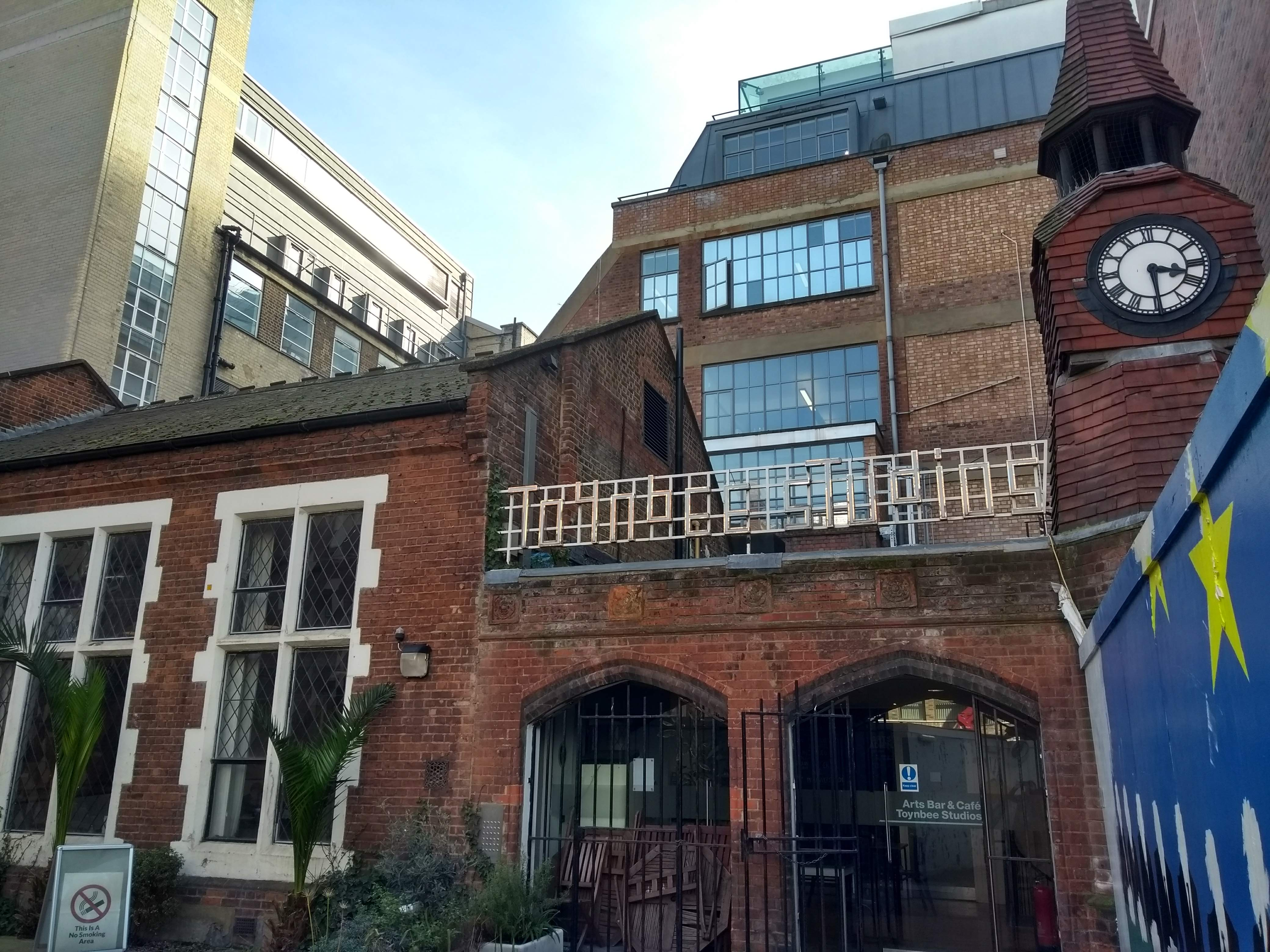
- Formation: 1979
- Founder: Judith Knight and Seonaid Stewart
- Location: Toynbee Studios 28 Commercial Street London
- Website: artsadmin.co.uk

Artsadmin is a UK-based organisation that provides support, resources and advisory services for artists working in the fields of performance, dance, live art and mixed media work. It was founded in 1979 by Judith Knight and Seonaid Stewart, and receives support from UK trusts and foundations, including Arts Council England. The organisation is funded predominantly through a National Portfolio Organisation grant.

Originally founded at Oval House, as of 2007 it was located at Toynbee Studios.

Raidene Carter is Artistic Director. She replaces Nicky Childs and Mark Godber who served as Interim Co-Artistic Directors, after previous Artistic Director left in May 2023.

Lab artists by year: 2024: Alia Hamaoui, Bint Mbareh, Jessica El Mal, Riwa Saab, Tasneim Zyada

2023: Stacy Makishi, Nando Messias, BULLYACHE, Zoë Laureen Palmer, Bebhe & Davies, Katy Baird, Victor Esses, Patricia Doors and Tamara Al-Mashouk

2021: Wendy Houstoun, Rebekah Ubuntu, Katarzyna Perlak, Seke Chimutengwende

2022: Charlie Folorunsho, Jo Fong, Whiskey Chow, Jamila Johnson Small, Chris Dobrowolski, Krishna Istha, Jade Blackstock, Lateisha Davine Lovelace-Hanson, Sheila Ghelani, Sung Im Her

== Bursary recipients ==
2018-19: Louise Ashcroft; Jenny Moore; Malik Nashad Sharpe; Max and Noa; Rachael Young; Simon Farid; Sophie Chapman + Kerri Jefferis; Sophie Hoyle; Umama Hamido	2016-17: Alicja Rogalska; FK Alexander; Larry Achiampong; Nwando Ebizie; Poppy Jackson; Richard Hards; Sam Curtis; Tim Bromage; Victoria Gray	2014-15: Lily Johnson; Lucy Hutson; Martin O'Brien; Project O; Reynir Hutber; Rosalie Schweiker; Rosana Cade	2013: Adam James; Eloise Fornieles; Gillie Kleiman; Grace Schwindt; jamie lewis hadley; LOW PROFILE; Nic Green; Nicola Canavan; Tania El Khoury
2010: Claire Cunningham; Emma Smith; Katherine Araniello; Noemi Lakmaier; Sinéad O'Donnell; Steven Ounanian; Tim Spooner	2007: Anna Furse; Deej Fabyc; Harminder Singh Judge; Heath Bunting; Ilana Mitchell; John Jordan; Michael Mayhew; Simon Whitehead & Barnaby Oliver; Susannah Hewlett; Tom Fleming & Edwin Pennicott	2006: Ajaykumar; Amy Sharrocks; Aura Satz; Bob Levene; Caglar Kimyoncu; Evangelia Basdekis; Joanna Karolini; Katherina Radeva; Laura H Trevail; Lucy Cash; Lucy Panesar; Melanie Clifford; Reza Aramesh; Sonya Dyer; Tomato Lichy; Tony Maas; Yara El-Sherbini	2005: Ben and Holly; David Blandy; Exit Strategy; Francesca Baglione; Grace Surman; Greta Mendez; Helena Hunter; Jocelyn Cammack; John Wild; Jonathon Allen; Juliet Ellis; Lisa Wesley; Lottie Leedham & Celia Willis; Mad for Real; Peter Atha; Rachel Gadsden; Rebecca Reid; Serena Korda; Sheila Ghelani; Stacy Makishi; Zeigam Azizov

== See also ==
- AccessArt
