= Amy Sharrocks =

British artist

Amy Sharrocks (née Norman) is a British live artist, sculptor, filmmaker and curator. Sharrocks's work focuses on collaboration and exchange, inviting people on journeys that they also help to create. She is known for large scale, live artworks in public places that use everyday activities, such as swimming or walking, in spectacular ways. Many of her artworks investigate the nature of cities, explore the importance of fluidity as a way of thinking, and question our constructs of city life. Her work has been supported by Arts Council England, The Live Art Development Agency and Artsadmin. Major works include SWIM (2007), a 50-person swim across London, and the ongoing Museum of Water (2013-Ongoing), a collection of over one thousand bottles of water from around the world.

== Early life and education ==
Sharrocks grew up in Camden and was educated at the Sorbonne in Paris, the University of Bristol, where she studied English and French, and in Fine Art at Camberwell College of Arts. She is the daughter of Anne Norman, a painter, and Torquil Norman, founder of the Roundhouse Trust.

== Selected works ==
Since 2005, Sharrocks has made live artworks about people and water. Her work often involves walking, swimming and other everyday frameworks to create 'new avenues for exploration and fantastic visions within the everyday'. She is currently organising Swim the Thames a proposal for an annual mass swim across the Thames as a live-art event. Sharrocks is a member of the Walking Artists Network, and has been interviewed by Andrew Stuck for the Talking Walking podcast.

=== pause (2005–2010) ===
A film shot on Oxford Street in which Sharrocks asked passers-by to hold their breath. It has been exhibited in London, Cambridge, Newcastle, France, Israel.

=== SWIM (2007) ===
Inspired by Frank Perry's film The Swimmer, Sharrocks invited people to 'swim across London from Tooting Bec Lido to Hampstead Heath ponds'. It has been referred to as a 'flesh mobbing'.

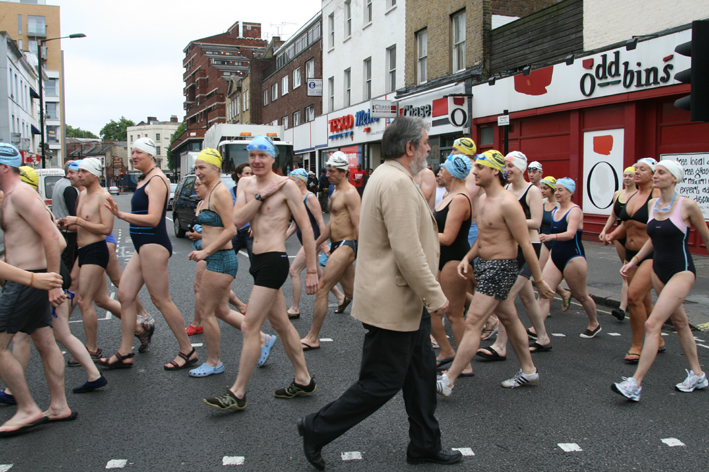
SWIM, 2007, photo Ruth Corney

=== drift (2009–2010, 2015) ===
drift (2009–2010, 2015) saw Sharrocks take participants one at a time for a drift on a boat in swimming pools throughout the United Kingdom, including an overnight drift in the London Aquatics Centre at Queen Elizabeth Olympic Park.

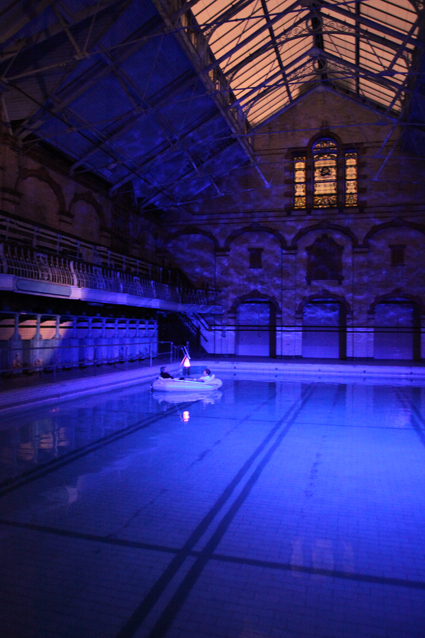
drift, Amy Sharrocks, photo Ruth Corney

=== London is a River City (2009) ===
London is a River City was a series of public walks exploring London's underground rivers through dowsing and re-mapping. The largest of these was Walbrook.

==== Walbrook (2009) ====
Walbrook saw 65 people walk silently through London at rush-hour, along the surface route of the subterranean Walbrook. The walk took place as part of Artsadmin's Two Degrees 2009.

=== Season for Falling and Invitation to Fall (2013) ===
Sharrocks makes work about falling, exploring the trips and stumbles of everyday life.^{:91} She focuses not only on the physical act of falling, but also the conceptual framework around the experience and meaning of falling. Sharrocks won the Sculpture Shock Award from the Royal British Society of Sculptors, which resulted in the exhibition Season for Falling. She also created An Invitation to Fall on the King's Road with the Museum of London. The work was an open invitation for participants to fall, and questioned notions of risk and shame, and explored the complicity of acts of witness. In 2012, Sharrocks hosted a Study Room Event at the Live Art Development Agency called A Guide to Falling; a full slide show is available at the LADA Study Room. She has recently written about the work for the journal Performance Research, in a long form essay titled 'An Anatomy of Falling', which was subsequently reproduced in the Live Art Almanac.

=== Museum of Water (2013–Ongoing) ===
The Museum of Water is 'a collection of publicly donated water and accompanying stories', in which the public is invited to browse the collection and add their own water samples and stories. As of 2017, the collection includes over 1000 bottles. The piece was featured at London's Somerset House in 2014 before touring the UK for three years. It has also toured across Europe and was nominated for European Museum of the Year 2016. It spent 18 months in the Netherlands 2016–7, and from 2018 the Australian collection will be permanently housed at the Western Australian Museum.

== Curation ==
=== Walking Women (2016) ===
Sharrocks and Clare Qualmann co-curated WALKING WOMEN at Somerset House, London and the Edinburgh Art Festival. The exhibition 'featured over forty women artists working with walking in a variety of media',^{:89} including Kubra Khademi, Deirdre Heddon and Misha Myers and Mona Hatoum among others. Qualmann and Sharrocks conceived the exhibition in response to their 'growing concern that walking is perceived as a male domain of practice', and it 'created a space for women walking artists to come together and share their practice, experiences and ideas, and learn about the diversity of women working in the field.'^{:98} They also produced a Study Room Guide for the Live Art Development Agency as part of an ongoing effort to reshape the canon of walking to reflect the practices of walking women.

=== Do Rivers Dream of Oceans? (2016) ===
Sharrocks curated Do Rivers Dream of Oceans? as part of WaterFest 2017 in Reading, England as part of the Reading Year of Culture. Also in Reading 2017 she organised the Fry's Island Swim, accompanied by the curated programme, What's the point of rivers, anyway?.

== Institutional Critique ==
In 2020, Sharrocks, with her collaborators, Madeleine Collie and Jade Montserrat, sued Tate for discrimination, victimisation and breach of contract, after she was denied the opportunity to work with Montserrat on the fifth year Tate Exchange programme on Love. “Tate's job is to support artists, not donors,” said Sharrocks. “Tate forgot this when they insisted on excluding Jade from a programme she had helped to develop." Tate never admitted liability, but did offer a six-figure settlement after the claim was lodged in the central London county court in January 2022. As part of the settlement agreement, Tate insisted the artists drop their Freedom of Information requests. Tate Exchange was subsequently dismantled.

Between 2020 and 2022, the "Um of Water" – an adaptation of Sharrocks's Museum of Water – was developed with a collective of indigenous artists and curators Sara Roque, Leslie McCue, and Elwood Jimmy. Originally slated to premiere at Luminato Festival, Toronto, in June 2022, the "Um of Water" was abruptly cancelled. The cancellation followed "many mistakes" by Luminato, which they ascribe, in part, to "internalized colonial systems and perspectives".

In 2024 Sharrocks shared the results of freedom of information requests regarding reports of sexual offences committed at the Reading and Leeds music festivals in an effort to draw attention to their prevalence.

== Awards ==
- Museum Oskar, Museum of Water, best temporary exhibition, Somerset House, London (2014)
- Sculpture Shock award, Royal British Society of Sculptors (2013)
