= Saul Ostrow =

American art critic and art curator

Saul Ostrow is an American art critic and art curator.

== Biography ==
In 1972, Ostrow received his MFA in art from the University of Massachusetts, Amherst. He has taught at Pratt Institute, Cleveland Institute of Art, Syracuse University, Parsons The New School for Design, School of the Visual Arts and was acting head of MFA studio program at New York University, Director of the Center for Visual Art and Culture at the University of Connecticut, and Chair of Visual Arts and Technologies at the Cleveland Institute of Art.

Since 1985, Ostrow has curated more than 60 exhibitions in the US and abroad. These include such exhibitions as Working Digitally: no Websites Please (2001, 2005) at the Center For Visual Culture, University of Connecticut and Modeling the Photographic: The Ends of Photography (2006) for the McDonough Museum of Art located in Youngstown, Ohio. Both of these focus on current art practice and included such internationally recognized artists: James Welling, Barbara Probst, Fabian Marcaccio, Joseph Nechvatal, Curtis Mitchell, Matthew Buckiam and Penelope Umbrico.

Saul Ostrow was the editor of the book series Critical Voices in Art, Theory and Culture published by Routledge in London and is the Art Editor at Large for Bomb Magazine. He was also Co-Editor of Lusitania Press from 1996 to 2004.)

In a 2011 interview with Brian Sherwin for FineArtViews, Ostrow declared that art criticism is important because it helps to establish the concept of the "collective self". Ostrow suggested that criticism is important because it helps to address the "contradictions and dichotomies inherent in our social and cultural lives". In the interview, Ostrow shared his experience as Art Editor for Bomb magazine and his insight into the "changing landscape" of art criticism due to the advent of the Internet and art blogs. When asked about sexism, ageism, and racism within the contemporary art world, Ostrow suggested that all three exist because all three exist in larger society.
