= Cathy Turner (artist) =

British artist and researcher

Cathy Turner is a British artist and researcher, specialising in dramaturgy, site-specific performance and walking art. She is a founder member of Wrights & Sites, and a Senior Lecturer in Drama at the University of Exeter. Turner's practice and research explore how one's life experience can influence one's perception of their environment.

== Dramaturgy ==
Turner's dramaturgical research focuses on the relationship between performance and place, an area she has explored and documented in her book Dramaturgy and Architecture: Theatre, Utopia and the Built Environment.

== Wrights & Sites ==
Turner is a founding member of Wrights & Sites, a group of artist-researchers who develop site-specific artistic works. They are best known for their walking misguides, and their use of the Letterist/Situationist practice of dérive.

== Walking Women ==
In 2009 Turner collaborated with Deirdre Heddon on a series of interviews with women walking artists. In their two essays, 'Walking Women: Shifting the Tales and Scales of Mobility' and 'Walking Women: interviews with artists on the move', Heddon and Turner argue that a fraternal lineage dominates walking, with the practices of female walkers erased or marginalised. Their work introduces the voices of contemporary female artists that walk into the historical record.

Heddon and Turner's work has sparked a series of practice-based interventions that focus on women who walk. These include 'Er Outdoors' a series of radio programs curated by Jo Norcup that make 'audible the voices of women past and present'; and WALKING WOMEN, a series of exhibitions, talks and events curated by Amy Sharrocks and Clare Qualmann that actively 're-write the canon' and 'imagine a future in which gender bias and skewed vision is destroyed'.

== Selected works ==
=== Performance ===
- Ambulant Architectures (2012), Sideways Festival, Belgium
- Everything you need to build a town is here (2010), Wonders of Weston, UK
- Mis-Guided: Elsewhere in Fribourg (2008), Belluard Bollwerk International Festival, Switzerland
- Mis-Guide: Stadtverführungen in Wien (2007), Tanzquartier Wien and Wienerfestwochen, Austria
- Possible Forests (2007), Centre for Contemporary Art and the Natural World, Devon, UK
- Blue Boy Walks (2004), Spacex Gallery, ‘Homeland’ Exhibition, Exeter and Winchester, UK
- And On The Thousandth Night… (2002), Kunsten Festival Des Arts, Belgium
- The Quay Thing, (1999), Exeter, UK

=== Dramaturgy ===
- Nora and I (2009), Funded by Arts Council England.
- Writing Space, (2008), Funded by The Arts and Humanities Research Council.
- An Infinite Line: (2007), contributed to Dramaturgical Labs for 2008 Brighton Festival

== Selected publications ==
Cathy Turner (2015). Dramaturgy and Architecture: Theatre, Utopia and the Built Environment. Palgrave.

Cathy Turner and Synne Behrndt (2007).Dramaturgy and Performance. Palgrave Macmillan.

Cathy Turner, Tony Weaver, Stephen Hodge, Simon Persighetti and Phil Smith (2006). A Mis-Guide to Anywhere. Wrights & Sites.
