= Walking art =

Walking as an artistic practice

Walking art refers to a variety of artistic practices that position walking as the central process, experience or outcome. Walking artists have diverse interests and it 'has gathered practitioners from nearly every field'.^{:43} Despite emerging from a variety of artistic and literary traditions, a 'common feature [of walking art] is the engagement of the body in a process of walking through a landscape based on a specific artistic design.'^{:161} Some artists consider walking an artistic end in itself, while others use walking as a means of mark-making, storytelling, social practice, or to create work in other artistic media.

== Origins ==
In her influential book Wanderlust, Rebecca Solnit traces the origins of walking as an artistic practice to the 1960s, when 'a new realm of walking opened up [ . . . ] walking as art.'^{:267} Other scholars, such as Francesco Careri and Blake Morris, highlight the importance of the Dada excursion of 1921, when the French contingent of the Dada movement led a walk at the Church of Saint-Julien-le-Pauvre in Paris.^{:34} Scholars also note the strong connection between writing, walking, and philosophy, from the peripatetic school of the Ancient Greeks to the walks of Romantic poets and artists, to the phenomenological works of Husserl and Merleau-Ponty.

=== Literary precedents ===
==== The Romantics ====
Scholars cite the British Romantics as exercising 'an outsized influence on contemporary considerations of walking' in the Western world.^{:24} For example, Solnit suggests that Romantics such as John Clare, Samuel Taylor Coleridge, Thomas De Quincey, John Keats, and William and Dorothy Wordsworth, helped establish walking as 'an expressive medium'.^{:101} In the United States, Henry David Thoreau, Ralph Waldo Emerson, and Walt Whitman were influential in establishing the relationship between writing and walking.

==== The flâneur ====
The French figure of the flâneur — a 'passionate spectator', typically male,^{:40} who goes on detached strolls through urban environments — is another important precedent. Fiona Wilkie argues it is one of the 'standard positions from which to theorize one's walking'.^{:19} The concept was popularised through the writings of Charles Baudelaire, who himself was inspired by Edgar Allen Poe's short story, 'The Man of the Crowd',^{:8} and Walter Benjamin's subsequent theorisations of those writings.

==== Eastern traditions ====
Eastern literary traditions have influenced the development of walking as an artistic practice. The seventeenth-century Japanese poet Matsuo Bashō was a peripatetic poet who is credited for formalizing haiku, and for whom the aesthetics of poetry and walking were closely linked. Hamish Fulton has cited Bashō as an influence on both his walking and writing practices. Bashō is also an inspiration for Alec Finlay, as seen in his 2011 work The Road North, which draws on Bashō's journals.

=== Historical avant-garde ===
==== Dadaism ====
Numerous scholars have agreed that the Dada excursion of 1921 was the first work where the act of walking itself was the art.^{:13} The excursion was organized by artists who would go on to found the Surrealist art movement, such as André Breton and Louis Aragon, as well as important members of the Dada movement, including Tristan Tzara and Francis Picabia.^{:34}

==== Surrealism ====
Walking is a core element of canonical Surrealist texts, such as Aragon's Le Paysan de Paris (1926), Breton's Nadja (1928) and Philippe Soupault's Last Nights of Paris (1928). For the Surrealists, walking was 'a medium through which to enter into contact with the unconscious part of the territory.'^{:79} From 'unplanned group walks through Paris to Meret Oppenheim's fabled walks on high ledges',^{:36} walking played a central role in surrealist practice.

Surrealist deambulations aimed for 'the achievement of a state of hypnosis by walking, a disorienting loss of control.'^{:79} In one ill-fated deambulation, André Breton, Louis Aragon, Max Morise, and Roger Vitrac traveled to Blois, a town selected at random from a map, and set off for a walk in the countryside, during which they made observations and experimented with automatic writings.^{:36} The walk ended in 'mounting hostility, fatigue, and disorientation', though for the Surrealists this was 'hardly disappointing, no matter how narrow its range, because it probed the boundaries between waking life and dream life'.

==== The Letterist and Situationist Internationals ====
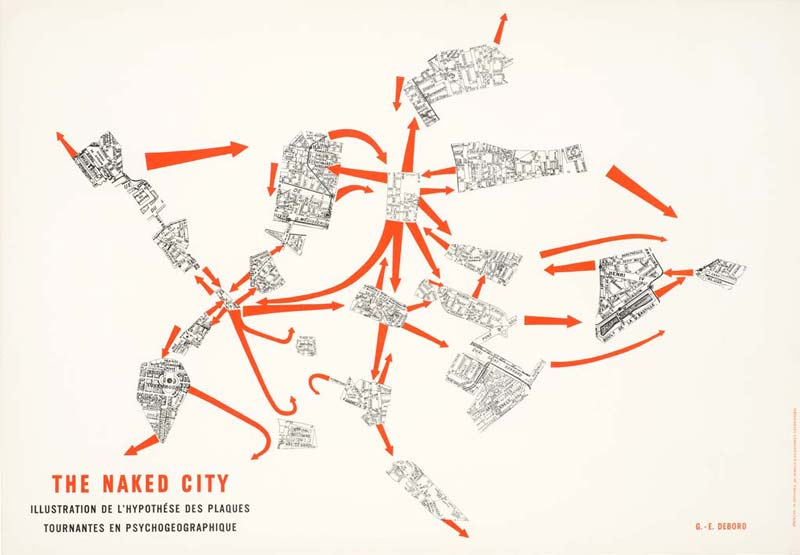
Guy Debord and Asger Jorn, The Naked City: Illustration de l'hypothèse des plaques tournantes en psychogéographique, 1957.

The Situationist International was formed in 1957 by members of the Letterist International, The International Movement for an Imaginist Bauhaus and the London Psychogeographical Society.^{:29} These groups, and particularly the Letterists, had started to explore the potential of walking as a revolutionary and artistic practice. The Situationist International, which cited the Dadaists and Surrealists as key influences,^{:181} continued to develop walking tactics that have been influential to contemporary artists and activists.

Essential to their programme was the development of the Letterist practice of the dérive. Dérive, which literally means drift in French, is an intentional method of exploring, understanding and participating in the urban landscape. Unlike the absurdity of the Dada excursion, or the aimlessness of Surrealist deambulations, the dérive follows certain procedures in order to understand and intervene in the urban environment. The Situationists were interested in both the internal and external effects of the dérive: the walker was meant to study the world around them and experience an internal sense of emotional disorientation. In many cases, disorientation was achieved with the aid of alcohol. In this way, it is essential to the development of psychogeography.

=== Neo-avant-garde ===
==== Fluxus ====
For Fluxus, walking fit into a larger strategy of making art out of everyday experiences. Fluxus artists defamiliarized the everyday by calling attention to overlooked details and emphasised simplicity, presence in time, and the unity of art and life. Art historian and critic Lori Waxman contrasts the psychoanalytical individualism of Surrealism and overt politics of the Situationists with a more experimental, collective ethos in Fluxus. By creating participatory works and scores for other artists to follow, Fluxus expanded how walking could be considered as an art practice. Benjamin Patterson exemplifies this approach with a piece called Stand Erect in his artists' book Methods and Processes (1961). The text piece describes the process of walking in a set of instructions that are both accurate and all but impossible to follow. One particularly influential piece is La Monte Young's 1960 Composition 1960 #10: 'Draw a straight line and follow it.'

==== Dematerialization and Sculpture in the Expanded Field ====
Richard Long's A Line Made by Walking (1967) — a photograph depicting 'a patch of grass Long trampled underfoot through a repetitive walking practice' — is 'routinely cited as the first work of walking art'.^{:5}^{:26} Rosalind Krauss includes Long's work in her discussion of sculpture in the expanded field.

Lucy Lippard identifies A Line Made by Walking as part of the dematerialization of art. Lippard and John Chandler identify two strains of dematerialized art: art as idea and art as action. Walking art often falls into the latter category — art as action. Lippard cites Stanley Brouwn as an artist whose walking art stems from the dematerialization of conceptual art. The following piece from 1962, quoted in its entirety, illustrates Brouwn's approach: 'a walk from a to b.' She also includes Vito Acconci, whose Following Piece (1969), saw Acconci executing the following instructions for nearly a month:

Each day I pick out, at random, a person walking in the street. I follow a different person every day; I keep following until that person enters a private place (home, office, etc) where I can’t get in.

The same year Yoko Ono created Rape (1969), a 'candid recording' in which a camera crew pursues a foreign woman through London, following her into her apartment until she collapses, terrified, in the corner. The well-known photographs that comprise the work were re-staged after the fact.

== Contemporary practices ==
Since the early 2000s there has been an increased interest in walking as an artistic practice. This has been exemplified by the establishment of a variety of walking networks, for example, the Walking Artists Network.

=== Major themes and motifs ===
==== Psychogeography ====
Merlin Coverly has argued that the playful, avant-garde origins of the dérive ultimately resisted Debord's call for rigor, with the vague definition of psychogeography allowing numerous artists to identify with the practice without yielding many tangible results. Other scholars have identified tangible results, for example Morag Rose identifies 'three brands of contemporary psychogeography: literary, activist and creative', which overlap and intersect.^{:81}

Examples of contemporary psychogeography include Manchester's Loiterers Resistance Movement, which Rose founded in 2006 and is 'the most consistently active psychogeography group in the United Kingdom.'^{:81}Paul Harfleet's Pansy Project, in which the artist plants pansies at locations where he has been subjected to homophobic slurs and documents them online. Artist Blake Morris has created site-specific memory palaces, such as his Former Fresnans project in Fresno, California, to record memories of walks.

==== Pilgrimage ====
Pilgrimage continues to inform aesthetic and spiritual interpretations of walking and artists take advantage of these strong associations. Hamish Fulton followed an ancient route from Winchester to Canterbury for his 165-mile walk, The Pilgrim's Way (1971). Fulton has also explored non-Western spiritual walking, as in Kora (2009), which references the Tibetan Kora — a circumambulatory meditation or pilgrimage.

==== Protests and processions ====
Protests and processions are a frequent reference point for walking artists, whether walking solo or with a group. For The Modern Procession (2002), Francis Alÿs borrowed the trappings of an elaborate religious procession to ritually move works from MoMA in Manhattan to Queens. Following a Peruvian brass band, palanquins bearing (replica) works from MoMA's collection were carried by over 150 volunteers through the streets of New York City and across the Queensboro Bridge.

In 2011, Hamish Fulton staged Slowalk (In support of Ai Weiwei) as a protest against the artist's imprisonment. Slowalk was a collective piece in which ninety-nine participants attempted to silently traverse Turbine Hall at the Tate Modern in precisely thirty minutes. The protest coincided with Ai Weiwei's exhibition Sunflower Seeds, also at the Tate.

In 2012, Clare Qualmann devised Perambulator, a 'mass processional' of people pushing strollers and prams through the streets of London, in order to highlight 'the inhospitable environment for pram walking' in London. In 2014, she created another version of the walk in Scotland, as part of Deveron Project's Slow Marathon in Huntly, Scotland.^{:121}

Regina José Galindo's Who Can Erase the Traces? (2003) protests an unconstitutional election, but does so with a track of bloody footprints between government buildings.

==== Following ====
Following is another strategy used by walking artists. As Debbie Kent points out,

The idea of artists following strangers has a long heritage, as well as a natural affinity with the city, where anonymity is the rule and it is easy to hide in the crowds. Its ancestor can be found in The Man of the Crowd, an 1840 short story by Edgar Allan Poe, in which the narrator pursues a mysterious stranger through the streets of London – then the biggest city in the world – for no apparent reason.

in 1980, Sophie Calle followed a man for thirteen days in Venice and noted his movements like a detective. Eventually she is discovered, but continues the project, which becomes the artists' book Suite Vénitienne in 1983 and an exhibition in 1996.

Artist Alisa Oleva applies following as a strategy in a variety of works. In one piece she 'mapped her explorations of one of Moscow’s “sleeping districts” (the residential zones where the vast majority of the city’s workers live) by following commuters home from a metro station.'

==== Endurance ====
Endurance is a component of many walking artists' practice. Guido van der Werve is an artist and marathon runner whose work explores repetition, endurance, and exhaustion. In 2011 he completed Nummer dertient, effugio C: you're always only half a day away, in which he ran laps around his house for twelve hours. Other artists test their endurance over great distances. This is the case in Two Lovers — the Great Wall Walk (1988) by performance artists Marina Abramović and Ulay. The two walked from opposite ends of the Great Wall of China and, after ninety days, met in the middle, embraced, and then parted ways to complete their journey from end to end.

==== Pushing and pulling ====
Pushing and pulling often accompany walking, especially for artists interested in endurance or absurdity. David Hammons walked down the streets of New York City, kicking a metal bucket, in his work Phat Free (1995–1999). Alÿs pushed an ice block down the streets of Mexico City until it melted in Sometimes Making Something Leads to Nothing (1997). In House and Universe (2012–2013), Mary Mattingly bundled all of her belongings into a massive ball, which she then dragged through the streets behind her.

==== Migration and borders ====
Migration and borders are frequent themes for walking artists since they represent extreme cases of mobility and its limit. Janine Antoni and Paul Ramirez-Jonas explore politics and power dynamics in their piece Migration (1999). The video piece shows the barefoot artists following literally in one another's footsteps on a beach, obliterating the other's footprint with each step. Francis Alÿs created The Green Line (Sometimes Doing Something Poetic Can Become Political, and Sometimes Doing Something Political Can Become Poetic) (2004) by dripping green paint from a can while he walked the green line that separates Jewish and Arab quarters of Jerusalem.

Deveron Project's Slow Marathon, a 'mass participation walk of twenty-six miles', has been examining borders and migration since Mihret Kebede and Claudia Zieske developed it in 2013.^{:108} Kebede originally wanted to walk from her home in Addis Ababa, Ethiopia to Scotland, but 'the combination of visa restrictions, harsh desert terrain, and the dangerous landscape' made the journey impossible. Instead she developed Slow Marathon: A 5,850 Miles Walk from Addis to Scotland and Back (2013), 'an accumulative marathon and shoelace exchange that combined the steps of a variety of participants from Huntly, Addis Ababa and other locations throughout the world to walk the 5,850 miles that make up the journey.' The project 'set up an intercultural exchange that interrogated borders and boundaries – physical, bureaucratic and imagined – through the act of walking'. The project has since occurred seven times with different artists. In 2018 it occurred simultaneously in Gaza and Huntly, a collaboration between artists May Murad in Palestine and Rachel Ashton in Scotland. Murad was unable to leave Palestine, and the limited terrain her group was able to walk, highlighted the different 'experiences of boundaries, borders, and access to land.'^{:120} Ridha Dhib's long-distance walking performance Ex-tracés (2022) has been discussed as an artistic engagement with migration and border regimes. The project consists of a multi-month walk from Paris toward the Turkish–Syrian border region (Mardin), undertaken in reverse along routes used by refugees. During the journey, Dhib inscribed fragments of the 1951 Geneva Convention relating to the Status of Refugees in braille at different locations and documented each stage through geolocated images and traces.

==== Mapping ====
Mapping serves as a reference point as well as a form of documentation for many walking artists. John Baldessari's California Map Project (1969) imagines that the text on a map is actually a feature of the landscape, as if viewed from above. The artist walked the land to spell CALIFORNIA in large letters made from ephemeral materials in the geographic locations where those letters appeared on a map. The Naked City: Illustration de l'hypothèse des plaques tournantes en psychogéographique (1957) by Guy Debord and Asger Jorn fragments and reconfigures a map of Paris to convey the experience of walking, or drifting, through the city. The map reflects what Debord found interesting rather than the city's actual geography. Richard Long sometimes traces his (often circular) walks onto conventional maps, as in Cerne Abbas Walk (1975). Long also makes experimental maps like Wind Line (1985) and Dartmoor Wind Circle (1988) which spatially represent the direction of the wind during his walk.

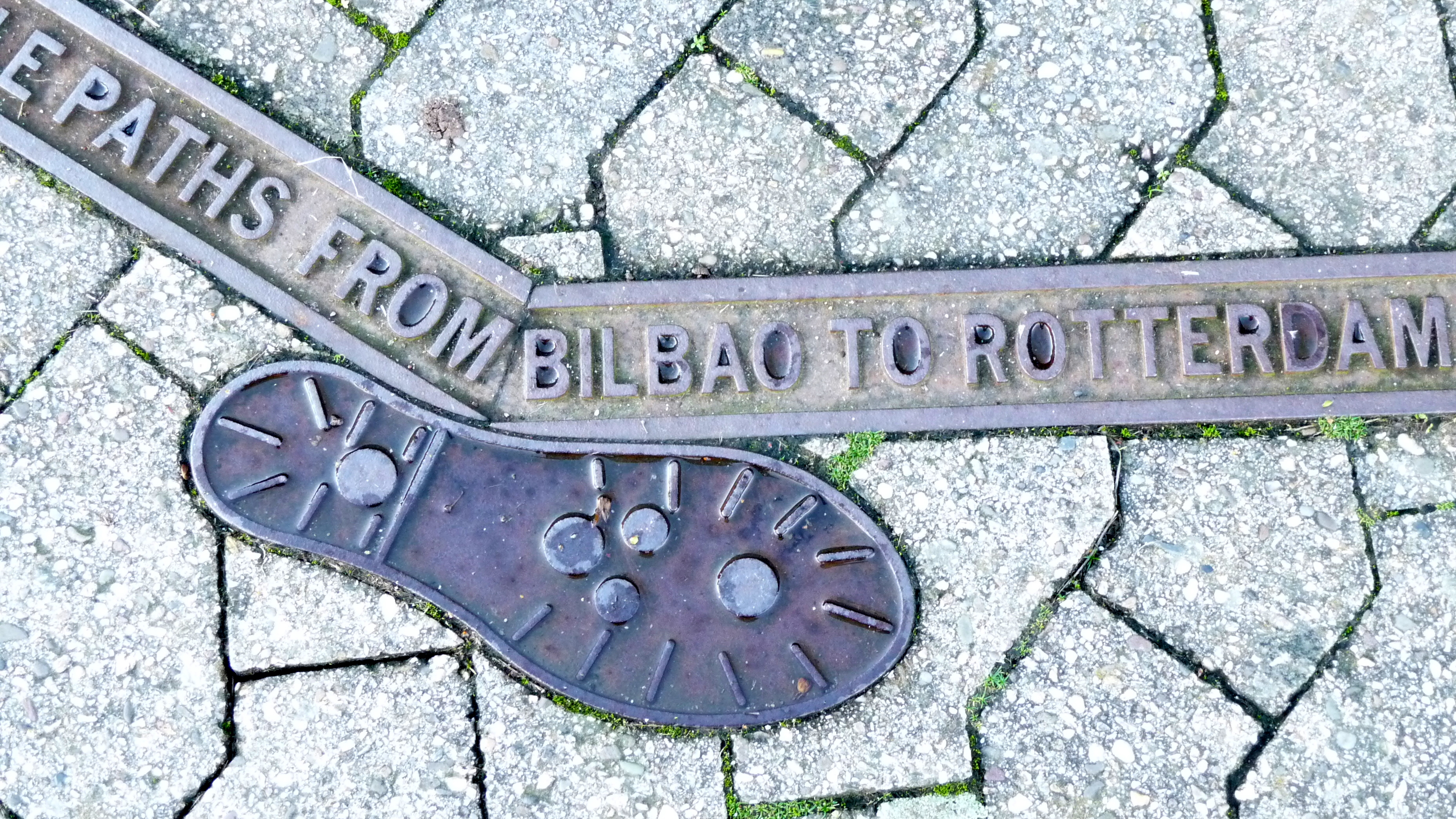
Hamish Fulton, Seven Paces, detail. Skulpturenufer Remagen.

==== Footprints ====
Footprints are a direct way for artists to leave a visible trace of their walking activity. Rudolf Stingel left his footprints in a Styrofoam slab by treading in boots soaked with acetone. Stuart Horodner comments that the untitled work from 2000 recalls the iconic images of the first footprints on the moon. In a series called Dirt Events, Curtis Mitchell fixes his footprints by caking dirt onto a store-bought rug and then walking on it until the rug reemerges. Gutai artist Akira Kanayama's 1956 work Ashiato (footprints) was a continuous sheet of vinyl with uniform painted footprints, running nearly 100 meters through the Outdoor Gutai Art Exhibition in Ashiya Park.

==== Footwear ====
Footwear has also been used by artists to represent walking or to stand in for an absent walker. In her series 100 Boots (1971–1973), Eleanor Antin photographed formations of empty boots to reference the Vietnam War. In his score,Taking a Shoe for a Walk 1989, Allan Kaprow calls for 'pulling a shoe on a string through the city' and bandaging one's own shoes as the shoe being dragged wears out. The art collective GRAV invited passers-by to wear spring-loaded shoes during their event, A Day in the Street (1966), which was designed to encourage more active engagement with the city. Marcus Coates made custom footwear for his 1999 piece Stoat, for which each shoe is a short wooden board balanced on two wooden pegs, which Coates lashed to his feet. Video shows the artist wobbling and shuffling down a gravel path.

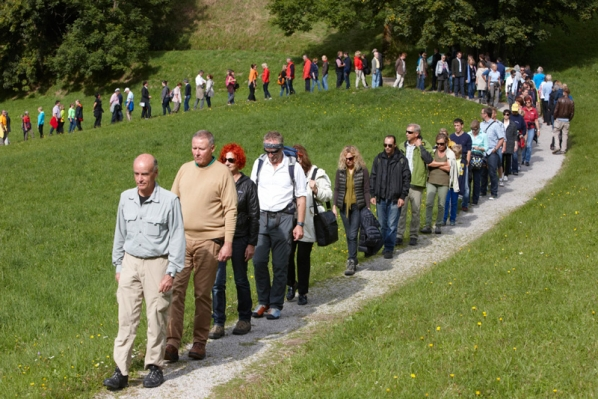
Hamish Fulton leads a public walk in September, 2013.

==== Group walks and guided walks ====
Carmen Papalia, a blind artist who creates participatory art, developed the work Blind Field Shuttle (2017) in which participants walk in a single-file line with their eyes closed, maintaining physical contact with one another, to follow Papalia on a guided walk. Simon Pope brings along one walker at a time for his series Memorial Walks (2007–2012). Participants were asked to view a landscape painting before walking and then to envision a particular tree from the painting on their walk, mentally transplanting it into the countryside. Mowry Baden creates interactive sculptures that guide the way the viewer walks through them. His work K Walk (1969) is a set of metal bars that perfectly match the gait of Baden's wife but impede anyone else who tries to walk through the sculpture.

== Documenting walking art ==
Artists often use walking as a process for creating work in other media, or present their walks through documentation, rather than the walk itself. Francis Alÿs, who often uses walking as part of his artistic process, has noted that

any work a visual artist is likely to produce, I would say more than 90% of its perception will happen through documentation and not the live event, documentation being a film, a photograph, a text, any possible media.^{:7}

Richard Long and Hamish Fulton, artists that helped establish walking as an art form, are particularly known for their use of walking to produce work in other artistic media.^{:5} Fulton, however, has argued that any document or artwork based on a walk 'will contradict the spirit of the walk', noting, '[e]ither you completed the walk or you didn't, and if two people make the same walk they will experience it in different ways.'^{:192} Other artists use video to capture the duration of their walks, like David Hammons. Janet Cardiff and her partner George Bures Miller also work in video, but they are especially known for sound pieces, including audio walks.

== Notable walking artists ==
- Marina Abramović
- Vito Acconci
- Francis Alÿs
- Janine Antoni
- Janet Cardiff
- Alec Finlay
- Hamish Fulton
- Sharon Harper
- Deirdre Heddon
- Akira Kanayama
- Richard Long
- Tom Marioni
- George Bures Miller
- Curtis Mitchell
- François Morelli
- Yoko Ono
- Clare Qualmann
- Ulay
- Richard Wentworth

See also Category:Walking artists.

== Organizations ==
- Loiterers Resistance Movement
- Walking Artists Network
- The Walking Institute

== Exhibitions ==
- 'Walking and Thinking and Walking'. 1996, Louisiana Art Museum, Denmark.
- Les Figures de la marche, un siècle d'arpenteurs de Rodin à Neuman. 2000-2001. Musée Picasso, Antibes.
- Horodner, Stuart, curator. Walk Ways. 2002–2004, Independent Curators International. traveling exhibition.
- Walk On: 40 Years of Walking. 2013, Pitshangar Manor Gallery, Northern Gallery of Contemporary Art, Midlands Art Centre Birmingham, Plymouth City Museum and Gallery.
- Artists Walks and the Persistence of Peripateticism. 2013, Dorsky Curatorial Gallery, New York City.
- Walking Artists Network. The Walking Encyclopaedia. 2014, Airspace Gallery, Stoke-on-Trent.
- Walking Sculpture 1967-2015. 2015, deCordova Sculpture Park and Museum, Lincoln, Massachusetts.
- Qualmann, Clare and Amy Sharrocks. WALKING WOMEN. 2016, Somerset House, London and Edinburgh Fringe.
- Loitering with Intent. 2016, People's History Museum, Manchester.
- Adams, Rachel, curator. Wanderlust: Actions, Traces, Journeys, 1967–2017. 2017–2018, University at Buffalo Art Galleries and Des Moines Art Center, traveling exhibition.
- S.T.E.P. 2018. Flux Factory and Queens Museum, New York City.
