= Wrights & Sites =

Wrights & Sites is a group of British artists who work with site-specific performance and walking art. Founded in 1997, Wrights & Sites consists of artist researchers Stephen Hodge, Simon Persighetti, Phil Smith and Cathy Turner. Their work is inspired by the Letterist and Situationist Internationals, particularly the practice of dérive.

in 1998, Wrights & Sites produced a three-week site specific festival, The Quay Thing (1998) that resulted in six new performance works, as well as a variety of smaller performances throughout the site. Professor Deirdre Heddon has identified this as her introduction to site-specific performance, and an influence on her future work. Subsequently, the group began to explore walking as their primary mode of artistic exploration. Phil Smith has noted, Wrights & Sites walking 'began as an anti-theatrical act' and 'the site-based performances of Wrights & Sites revealed places to be as performed as the performances in them.'

Wrights & Sites walking practices are best known through their 'Misguides', a series of texts they published with contributions from Tony Weaver. The 'Misguides' provide instructions to make familiar places unfamiliar and inspire the reader to playfully subvert the city through walking.

== Selected works and exhibitions ==
- 4 Screens #4: Possible Forests (2007), Centre for Contemporary Art and the Natural World, Haldon Forest Park
- 4 Screens #2: A Mis-Guide To Anywhere (2006) Gallery of Utopias, for PSi#12 Performing Rights, London
- tEXt & the city (2002) Exeter Picture House
- Mis-Guided To Anywhere (2004) Urbis, Manchester
- An Exeter Mis-Guide (2004) Exeter Central Library
- An Exeter Mis-Guide (2003) Exeter Phoenix
- A Courtauld Mis-Guide (2003-5) Courtauld Institute, London
- An Exeter Mis-Guide (concept pages) (2003) Exeter Picture House

== Selected publications ==
- Stephen Hodge & Daniel Belasco Rogers (2007) 'What is a theatre? Where is it and how do you get there?', in Performance Research, 12.2(June).
- Phil Smith (2007) 'From Theatre To Dispersal: A Journey From Stalowa Wola To Mobile Machinoeki', in Performance Research, 12.2 (June).
- Wrights & Sites (2006) ''A Manifesto for a New Walking Culture: 'dealing with the city'', in Performance Research, 11.2 (June).
- Cathy Turner (2004) 'Palimpsest or Potential Space? Finding a Vocabulary for Site-Specific Performance' New Theatre Quarterly, XX.4(No. 80) (November).
- Wrights & Sites (2000) 'SITE-SPECIFIC: The Quay Thing Documented', in Studies in Theatre and Performance, Supplement 5.
