= Contemporary art =

Art of the present time

Contemporary art

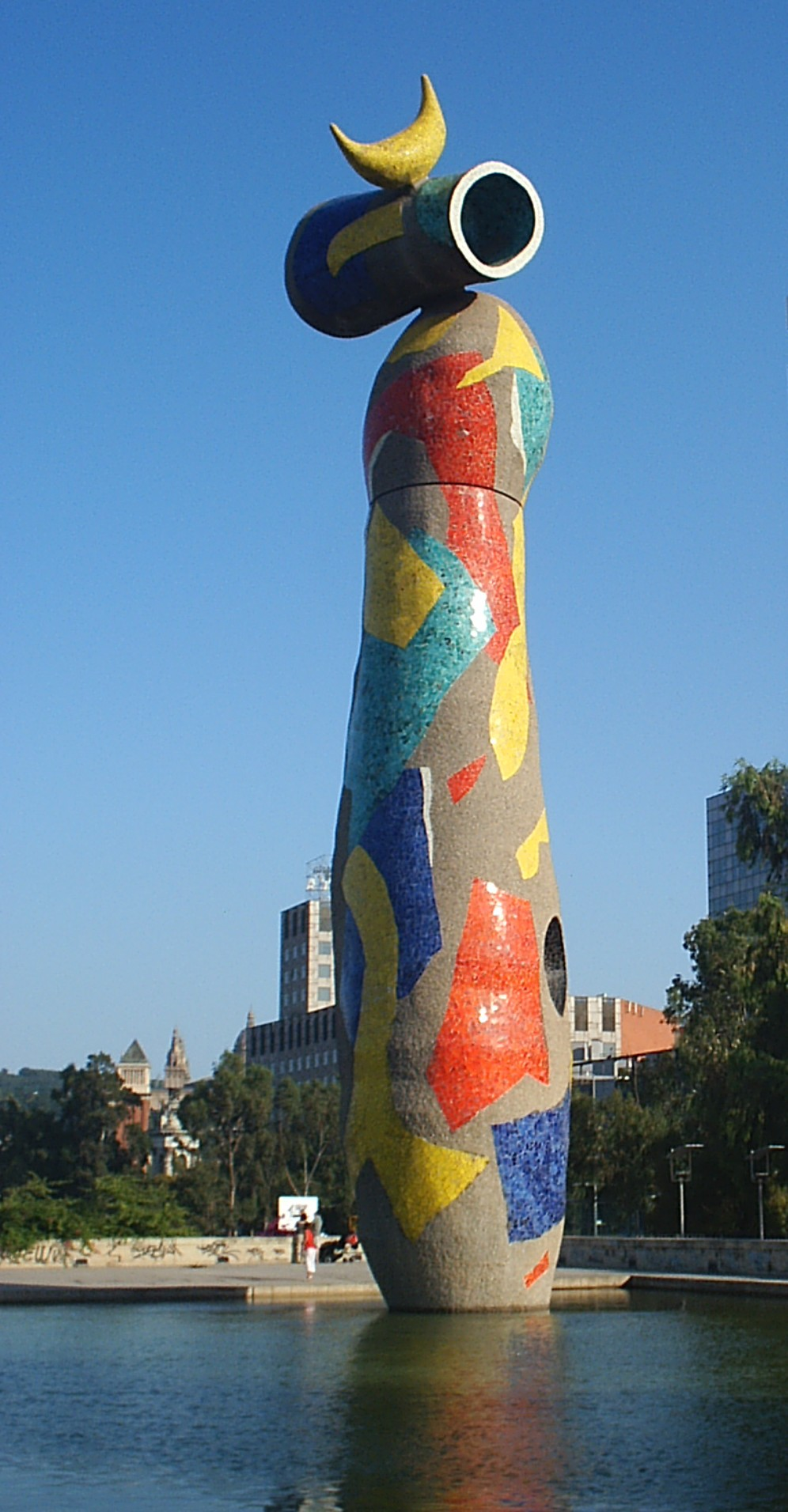
Dona i Ocell, by Joan Miró

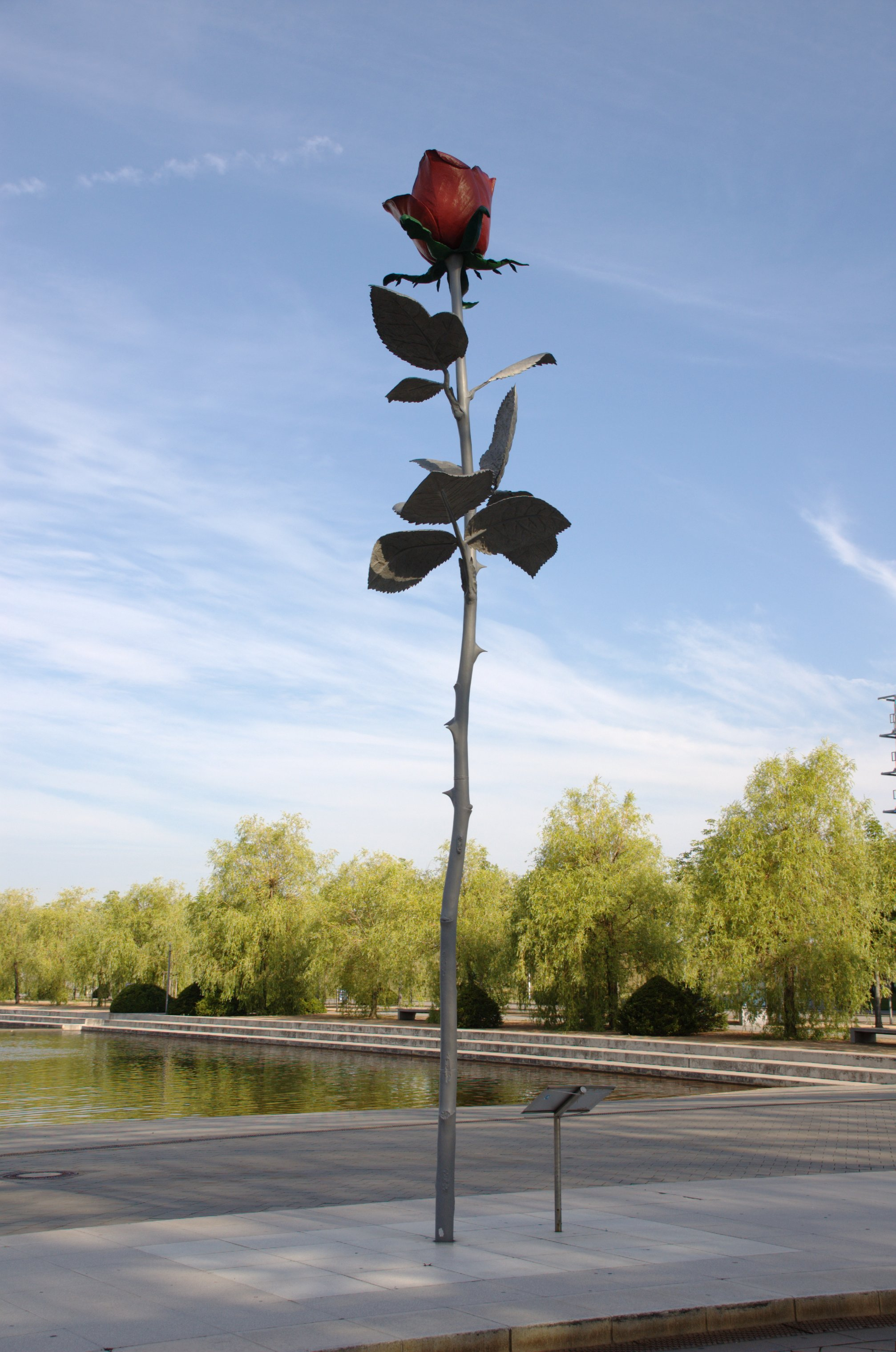
Rose, by Isa Genzken

Contemporary art is generally art created from the 1970s onwards. Contemporary artists work in a globally influenced, culturally diverse, and technologically advancing world. Their art is a dynamic combination of materials, methods, concepts, and subjects that continue the challenging of boundaries that was already well underway in the 20th century. Diverse and eclectic, contemporary art as a whole is distinguished by the very lack of a uniform, organising principle, ideology, or "-ism". Contemporary art is part of a cultural dialogue that concerns larger contextual frameworks such as personal and cultural identity, family, community, and nationality.

In English, modern and contemporary are synonyms, resulting in some conflation and confusion of the terms modern art and contemporary art by non-specialists. The latter is the art of today. Some specialists also consider that the frontier between the two is blurry; for instance, the French Musée National d'Art Moderne does not differentiate them in its collections.

== Scope ==
The classification of "contemporary art" as a special type of art, rather than a general adjectival phrase, goes back to the beginnings of Modernism in the English-speaking world. In London, the Contemporary Art Society was founded in 1910 by the critic Roger Fry and others, as a private society for buying works of art to place in public museums. A number of other institutions using the term were founded in the 1930s, such as in 1938 the Contemporary Art Society of Adelaide, Australia, and an increasing number after 1945. Many, like the Institute of Contemporary Art, Boston changed their names from ones using "modern art" in this period, as Modernism became defined as a historical art movement, and much "modern" art ceased to be "contemporary". The definition of what is contemporary is naturally always on the move, anchored in the present with a start date that moves forward, and the works the Contemporary Art Society bought in 1910 could no longer be described as contemporary.

Particular points that have been seen as marking a change in art styles include the end of World War II and the 1960s. There has perhaps been a lack of natural break points since the 1960s, and definitions of what constitutes "contemporary art" in the 2010s vary, and are mostly imprecise. Art from the past 20 years is very likely to be included, and definitions often include art going back to about 1970; "the art of the late 20th and early 21st century"; "both an outgrowth and a rejection of modern art"; "Strictly speaking, the term 'contemporary art' refers to art made and produced by artists living today"; "Art from the 1960s or [19]70s up until this very minute"; and sometimes further, especially in museum contexts, as museums which form a permanent collection of contemporary art inevitably find this aging. Many use the formulation "Modern and Contemporary Art", which avoids this problem. Smaller commercial galleries, magazines and other sources may use stricter definitions, perhaps restricting the "contemporary" to work from 2000 onwards. Artists who are still productive after a long career, and ongoing art movements, may present a particular issue; galleries and critics are often reluctant to divide their work between the contemporary and non-contemporary.

Sociologist Nathalie Heinich draws a distinction between modern and contemporary art, describing them as two different paradigms which partially overlap historically. She found that while "modern art" challenges the conventions of representation, "contemporary art" challenges the very notion of an artwork. She regards Duchamp's Fountain (which was made in the 1910s in the midst of the triumph of modern art) as the starting point of contemporary art, which gained momentum after World War II with Gutai's performances, Yves Klein's monochromes and Rauschenberg's Erased de Kooning Drawing.

== Themes ==
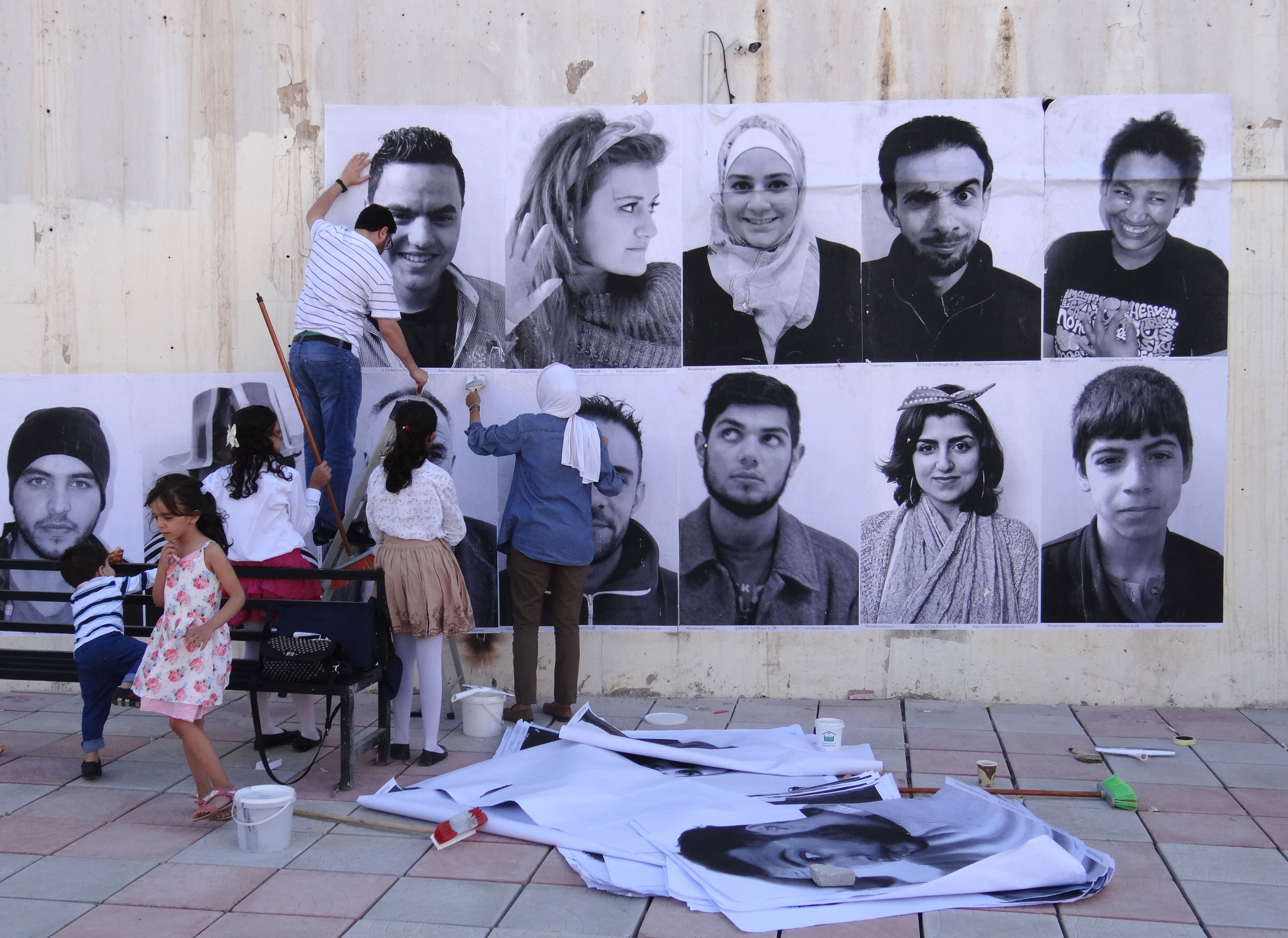
Irbid, Jordan, "We are Arabs. We are Humans". Inside Out is a global participatory art project, initiated by the French photographer JR, an example of Street art.

Contemporary artwork is characterised by diversity: diversity of material, of form, of subject matter, and even time periods. It is "distinguished by the very lack of a uniform organizing principle, ideology, or - ism" that is seen in many other art periods and movements. Contemporary art does not have one, single objective or point of view, so it can be contradictory and open-ended. There are nonetheless several common themes that have appeared in contemporary works, such as identity politics, the body, globalization and migration, technology, contemporary society and culture, time and memory, and institutional and political critique. Contemporary art has increasingly reflected themes of globalization, migration, and cultural identity since the late 20th century. Examples include works addressing immigration and displacement in urban contexts, as well as queer contemporary art of the Middle East and North Africa.

== Institutions ==
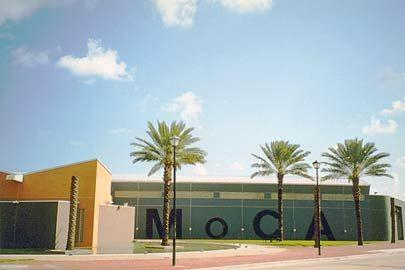
The Museum of Contemporary Art in Miami, Florida

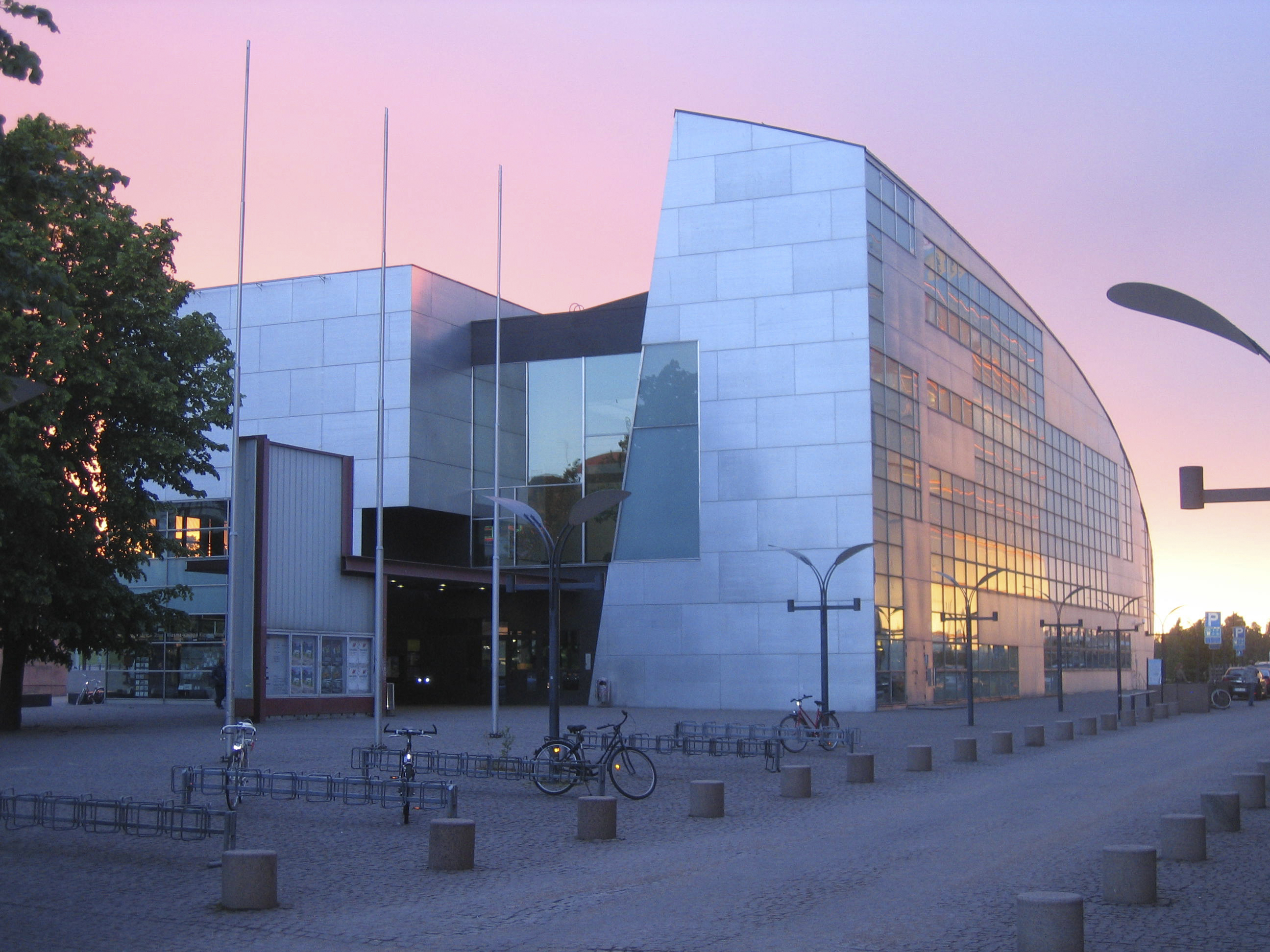
Kiasma, a contemporary art museum in Helsinki, Finland

The functioning of the art world is dependent on art institutions, ranging from major museums to private galleries, non-profit spaces, foundations, art schools and publishers, and the practices of individual artists, curators, writers, collectors, and philanthropists. A major division in the art world is between the for-profit and non-profit sectors, although in recent years the boundaries between for-profit private and non-profit public institutions have become increasingly blurred. Most well-known contemporary art is exhibited by professional artists at commercial contemporary art galleries, by private collectors, art auctions, corporations, publicly funded arts organizations, contemporary art museums or by artists themselves in artist-run spaces. Contemporary artists are supported by grants, awards, and prizes as well as by direct sales of their work. Career artists train at art school or emerge from other fields. In recent years, fashion illustration has seen a revival through social media platforms, where independent artists have gained visibility by sharing their work digitally.

There are close relationships between publicly funded contemporary art organizations and the commercial sector. For instance, in 2005 the book Understanding International Art Markets and Management reported that in Britain a handful of dealers represented the artists featured in leading publicly funded contemporary art museums. Commercial organizations include galleries and art fairs.

Corporations have also integrated themselves into the contemporary art world, exhibiting contemporary art within their premises, organizing and sponsoring contemporary art awards, and building up extensive corporate collections. Corporate advertisers frequently use the prestige associated with contemporary art and coolhunting to draw the attention of consumers to luxury goods.

The institutions of art have been criticized for regulating what is designated as contemporary art. Outsider art, for instance, is literally contemporary art, in that it is produced in the present day. However, one critic has argued it is not considered so because the artists are self-taught and are thus assumed to be working outside of an art historical context. Craft activities, such as textile design, are also excluded from the realm of contemporary art, despite large audiences for exhibitions. Art critic Peter Timms has said that attention is drawn to the way that craft objects must subscribe to particular values in order to be admitted to the realm of contemporary art. "A ceramic object that is intended as a subversive comment on the nature of beauty is more likely to fit the definition of contemporary art than one that is simply beautiful."

== Public attitudes ==
Contemporary art can sometimes seem at odds with a public that does not feel that art and its institutions share its values. In Britain, in the 1990s, contemporary art became a part of popular culture, with artists becoming stars, but this did not lead to a hoped-for "cultural utopia". Some critics like Julian Spalding and Donald Kuspit have suggested that skepticism, even rejection, is a legitimate and reasonable response to much contemporary art. Brian Ashbee in an essay called "Art Bollocks" criticizes "much installation art, photography, conceptual art, video and other practices generally called post-modern" as being too dependent on verbal explanations in the form of theoretical discourse. However, the acceptance of nontraditional art in museums has increased due to changing perspectives on what constitutes an art piece.

== Concerns ==
A common concern since the early part of the 20th century has been the question of what constitutes art. In the contemporary period (1970 to now), the concept of avant-garde may come into play in determining what artworks are noticed by galleries, museums, and collectors. Video games as an art form emerged as a new medium in the period, and remain a point of debate among some critics.

The concerns of contemporary art come in for criticism too. Andrea Rosen has said that some contemporary painters "have absolutely no idea of what it means to be a contemporary artist" and that they "are in it for all the wrong reasons."

== Prizes ==
Some competitions, awards, and prizes in contemporary art are:

- The Golden and Silver Lions of the Venice Biennale
- Emerging Artist Award awarded by The Aldrich Contemporary Art Museum
- Factor Prize in Southern Art
- Hugo Boss Prize awarded by the Solomon R. Guggenheim Museum
- John Moore's Painting Prize
- Kandinsky Prize for Russian artists under 30
- Marcel Duchamp Prize awarded by ADIAF and Centre Pompidou
- Ricard Prize for a French artist under 40
- Turner Prize for British artists
- The Bucksbaum Award of the Whitney Biennial
- Vincent Award, The Vincent van Gogh Biennial Award for Contemporary Art in Europe
- The Winifred Shantz Award for Ceramists, awarded by the Canadian Clay and Glass Gallery
- Asia Pacific Breweries Foundation Signature Art Prize
- Jindřich Chalupecký Award for Czech artists under 35

== History ==
This table lists art movements and styles by decade. It should not be assumed to be comprehensive. While the 1950s and 1960s movements predate the contemporary era, many of them remained active after that point, or influenced contemporary works. Some movements span multiple decades; in these cases they are listed in the period they were most active in.

=== 1950s ===
- Abstract expressionism
- American Figurative Expressionism
- American scene painting
- Antipodeans
- Bay Area Figurative Movement
- British Constructivists
- Brutalism
- COBRA (avant-garde movement)
- Color Field
- Generación de la Ruptura
- Groupe Espace
- Gutai group
- Informalism
- Lenticular prints
- Les Plasticiens
- Lyrical abstraction
- Modern traditional Balinese painting
- New York School
- Serial art
- Situationist International
- Soviet Nonconformist Art
- Red Shirt School of Photography
- Tachisme
- Vienna School of Fantastic Realism
- Washington Color School

=== 1960s ===
- Abstract Imagists
- American lyrical abstraction
- Art & Language
- AI art (GOFAI version)
- Bay Area Figurative Movement
- BMPT
- Chicago Imagists
- Chicano art movement
- Color field
- Early computer art
- Conceptual art
- Fluxus
- Happenings
- Hard-edge painting
- Institutional critique
- Kinetic art
- Lenticular prints
- Light and Space
- Minimalism
- Neo-Dada
- New York School
- Nouveau Réalisme
- Op Art
- Performance art
- Pop Art
- Post-painterly Abstraction
- Psychedelic art
- Retro art
- Soft sculpture
- Systems art
- Zero

=== 1970s ===
- Arte Povera
- Ascii Art
- Bad Painting
- Body art
- Artist's book
- COUM Transmissions
- Environmental art
- Feminist art
- Froissage
- Generative art
- Holography
- Installation art
- Land art
- Lowbrow
- Mail art
- Mono-ha
- Papunya Tula
- Photorealism
- Plop Art
- Postminimalism
- Process Art
- Robotic art
- Systems Group
- Saint Soleil School
- Video art
- Funk art
- Pattern and Decoration
- Video art
- Warli painting revival
- Wildstyle

=== 1980s ===
- AIDS Memorial Quilt
- Appropriation art
- Chinese Apartment Art
- Culture jamming
- Demoscene
- Electronic art
- Figuration Libre
- Fractal art
- Graffiti Art
- Late modernism
- Live art
- Neue Slowenische Kunst
- Pixel art
- Postmodern art
- Neo-conceptual art
- Neo-expressionism
- Neo-pop
- Sound art
- Street art
- Transavantgarde
- Transgressive art
- Vancouver School
- Video installation

=== 1990s ===
- Art intervention
- Bio art
- Cyberarts
- Cynical Realism
- Digital art
- Hyperrealism
- Information art
- Internet art
- Massurrealism
- Maximalism
- New Leipzig School
- New media art
- New European Painting
- Relational art
- Software art
- Toyism
- Tactical media
- Tape art
- Taring Padi
- Verdadism
- Western and Central Desert art
- Young British Artists

=== 2000s ===
- Altermodern
- Classical Realism
- Excessivism
- Frutiger Aero
- Kitsch movement
- Post-contemporary
- Metamodernism
- Pseudorealism
- Remodernism
- Renewable energy sculpture
- Stuckism
- Superflat
- Superstroke
- Sustainable art
- Urban art
- Videogame art
- VJ art
- Virtual art
- Walking Art
- YouTube Poop

=== 2010s ===
- Art Résilience
- CalArts style
- Corporate Memphis
- Flat design
- Postinternet
- Vaporwave
- Walking Artists Network

=== 2020s ===
- AI art (T2I model version)
- Glassmorphism
- Liminal space
- NFT art
- Pandemic art
- Pool Rooms
- Weirdcore

== See also ==
- Acculturation
- Anti-art and Anti-anti-art
- Art:21 - Art in the 21st Century (2001–2016), a PBS series
- Criticism of postmodernism
- Classificatory disputes about art
- List of contemporary art museums
- List of contemporary artists
- Medium specificity
- Reductive art
- Value theory
- Visual arts
- Word art
- New media art
