= Loiterers Resistance Movement =

British activist organisation

The Loiterers Resistance Movement (2006–present) is a "Manchester-based collective of artists and activists interested in psychogeography and public space." The Loiterers Resistance Movement (LRM) are core contributors to what Tina Richardson has identified as the "new psychogeography", and a variety of scholars have cited the LRM as key to the development of contemporary British psychogeography.

== History ==
Artist, activist and scholar Morag Rose founded the LRM in Manchester in 2006. It is 'a Situationist-inspired psychogeography group that roams the city sharing knowledge and experiences of the ever-changing urban environment.' Rose founded the group 'motivated by love and curiosity for Manchester and a concern, sometimes rage, at the damage neoliberalism causes to our communities.'

Since its foundation, the LRM has met on the first Sunday of every month for 'a free communal wander, open to anyone curious about the potential of public space and unravelling stories hidden within our everyday landscape.' Over the course of these walks, the LRM has engaged the city in a variety of ways. These include 'an attempt to "dematerialise" the new Beetham Tower', and 'impromptu concert with kazoos and tambourines' in an underground car park.

The LRM does not have requirement for consistent membership and 'people float in and out and define their own level of commitment. Rose identifies it 'as a free floating community', stating, 'People don't tend to show up every month like clockwork, but it's also rare to only see a face once.' The LRM is part of the Walking Artists Network, and participates in network discussions and events.

During the COVID-19 pandemic, which limited people's ability to walk together in person, the LRM expanded to use digital methods to allow people to walk together at a distance.

=== Loitering With Intent (2016) ===
In 2016 the LRM curated the Arts Council England funded exhibition Loitering with Intent at the People's History Museum in Manchester. The exhibition had 'an explicit political agenda to uncover the powerful dynamics that shape Manchester and offer an alternative way to view them.' The exhibition featured 'material from The LRM archive, documenting [their] expeditions as well as posters, found objects and handcrafted items used to guide walks such as CCTV Bingo Cards, game pieces made from metal salvaged from car manufacturing and maps transformed into fortune tellers', as well as 'contributions from local, national and international artists inspired by psychogeography' in the form of 'film, drawing, painting, DIY maps, photographs' and a variety of other media.

== Theory and practice ==
The LRM is founded on the principle that 'the Streets belong to everyone', which Rose identifies as 'an aspiration, not a statement of fact.' Drawing heavily on the Letterist and Situationist concept of psychogeography, the LRM adapts tactics such as dérive and détournement in their practice. The LRM describes this as 'a way of walking across the city which ignores normal conventions of going from A to B. Instead [the] route is guided by playfulness, feeling and instinct.' They note that a 'variety of methods can be used to shape a wander' and that each exploration is unique and 'shaped by whoever turns up on the day'.

For Rose, the dérive 'offers alternative ways to think about space and walking together helps to connect, interrogate and explore our city.' The group attempts to 'complicate the official narrative and deviate from the official tour' and explore the city as a site of multiple narratives, diversity and personal history'. In their manifesto, they state,

We can't agree on what psychogeography means but we all like plants growing out of the side of buildings, looking at things from new angles, radical history, drinking tea and getting lost; having fun and feeling like a tourist in your home town. Gentrification, advertising and blandness makes us sad. We believe there is magic in the Mancunian rain. Our city is wonderful and made for more than shopping. The streets belong to everyone and we want to reclaim them for play and revolutionary fun.

Following the Situationist focus on practice, Rose states, 'the LRM do agree that psychogeography has to be practice as well as theory; that praxis belongs on the street and is shaped by our footsteps.'

== Legacy ==
The Loiterers Resistance Movement are core contributors to contemporary psychogeographical practices in the United Kingdom, and part of what Tina Richardson has identified as the 'new psychogeography'.

In 2017, Rose was awarded the Living Streets Charles Maher Award for her work with the LRM and her contributions to and engagement with the public space of Manchester.

Scholars and curators have identified the LRM as contributing to the visibility and practices of walking women: they were featured on the BBC Radio 4 broadcast, 'The Art of Now: Women Who Walk' (2018), and are also included in the Live Art Development Agency's Study Room Guide on WALKING WOMEN (2015).

== See also ==
- Commons
- Freedom to roam
- Loitering
- Open Spaces Society
- Public land
- Reclaim the Streets
- Street reclamation
