= Katherine Araniello =

English performance artist and disability activist (1965–2019)

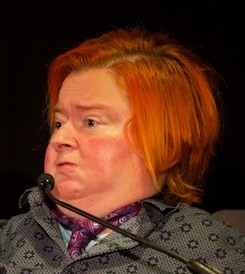
- Born: 21 September 1965
- Died: 25 February 2019 (aged 53)
- Education: London Guildhall University; Goldsmiths College
- Occupation: Live art Performance Video artist

Katherine Araniello (21 September 1965 – 25 February 2019) was a London-based live art, performance and video artist, who responded to the negative representation of disability. She used a range of mediums including film, large scale production and live art performances. Araniello was a member of The Disabled Avant-Garde (DAG) with deaf artist Aaron Williamson.

== Career ==
Araniello trained in Fine Art at London Guildhall University (1996–99) and Goldsmiths College (2002–2004). Her work challenged representations of physical disability. Her prime focus was to subvert and parody complex contemporary issues often having to do with disability, such as assisted suicide, media representation, prejudice and ignorance and body aesthetics. She regularly collaborated with Aaron Williamson under the name of The Disabled Avant-Garde. She was a member of the film collective 15MM, and showed work at Beaconsfield, Tate Modern, Gasworks and Serpentine Gallery and more.

== Key works ==
The Dinner Party was first performed in 2011 at Tonybee Studios after Araniello received an Artsadmin bursary. It was a performance to camera, based on the comedy sketch Dinner for One (1920) written by British author Lauri Wylie which was recorded in Germany (1963). It subsequently became the scheduled New Year's Eve viewing by several German TV stations, and continues to be played to this day. Araniello replaced the invisible dinner guests from the original comedy sketch with disability personas that were over-inflated and self-indulgent, to instill a sense of irony and satire. All the characters were played by Araniello and were representative of clichéd models of disability.

The Dinner Party Revisited was performed in September, 2014 at the Southbank Centre as part of Unlimited Festival.

The Disabled Avant-Garde (Araniello and Aaron Williamson) was commissioned as part of M21: From the Medieval to the 21st Century, in which they created the piece Wayward Mascots (2012).

== Notable exhibitions and performances ==
Notable exhibitions include The Disabled Avant-Garde Today!, Gasworks, London (2006); The Staircase Miracles, The Serpentine Gallery, London (2005); The Staircase Miracles, The Custard Factory, Birmingham (2005); Invalid, Stephen Lawrence Gallery, London (2004); PILOT 1, Limehouse Town Hall, London (2004); and I am not a feminist, I am normal, Austrian Cultural Forum, London (2004).

Araniello participated in film festivals including the Disability Film Festival, National Film Theatre, London (1999–2005); 18th London Lesbian and Gay Film Festival, NFT, London (2004); Retour d’Images – European Year of People with Disabilities, Paris, France (2003); and KynnysKINO4 Film Festival, Helsinki, Finland (2003).

Performances include No Room at the Igloo: An Xmas Pageant, Royal Festival Hall, London (2008); Terminal, Late at Tate Britain, London (2008), and The Rhinestone Rollers, Paralympics Handover, Hackney Town Hall (2008).

Araniello ran workshops for Shape Arts, Ikon Gallery, LGBT Conference, and GLAD.
