= Monique Besten =

Dutch artist

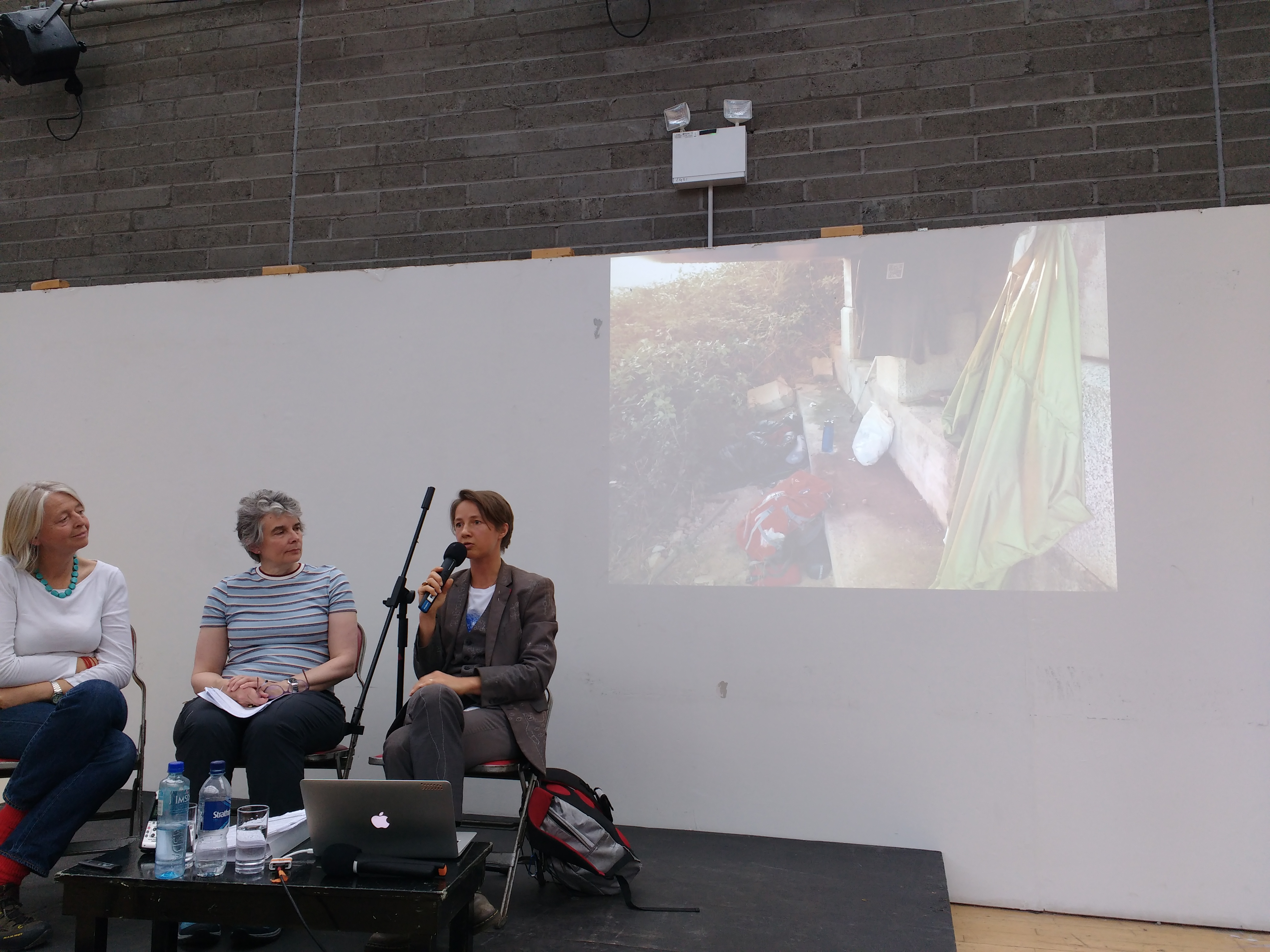
Left to right: Claudia Zeiske, Alison Lloyd and Monique Besten in discussion at 'Walking Women', Edinburgh 2016

Monique Besten is a walking artist, writer, performer, historian and activist. She is known for her long-distance walking work, and is the subject of articles and publications discussing the use of walking as an art practice; she is a member of the Walking Artists Network. She has been cited by scholar Phil Smith as part of a new generation of artists engaging site-specific theatre through 'performative journeys'.

== Biography ==
Besten studied Medieval, Cultural history, Media Art and Public art in The Netherlands, Ireland and Germany.

== Key works ==
=== The New Riddles and Constellations (2014) ===
Over four to eight weeks she invites a range of different artists to join and work next to each other. This leads on to developing new work. On her walks she wears a 3-piece suit which has stitched embroidery pieces of art inspired by the journeys. She takes photos, writing, drawing and videos to document and create art out of her work.

=== The Plastic Crusader Walk (2012) ===
A 64 kilometer walk that traveled from Amsterdam to Utrecht. Her aim was to collect every piece of waste plastic she could find. She attached each piece of plastic to herself that then created a large snail shape carried on her back. She gave it to the 'Metaal Kathedraal' and became part of and installation called the '8th continent.'

=== A Soft Armour (2016) ===
Besten wore this suit for 108 days; the suit was then shown in the AirSpace gallery. The walk started in Amsterdam the Nomadic village in the south of France (2013). She sewed a new price of text or images and names of the people she had met along the way to the inside of her three-piece suit every day. this created a collaged map of how she saw the world. Through the performance she also wrote reflections which are also on display.

=== The Dark Mountains Project (October 2015- May 2016) ===
This project was based in Stockholm: a variety of artists, theatre makers, performers and writers began their walk through the dark. The walk-around meeting at various places picking up new people to join then and give them more clues into their culture along their way. They invited new guests, artists, writers, performers and theatre markers, one being Besten in Stockholm (15 February 2016). With her they tried to discover and work out the way in which we talk about what is going on in the world.

== Awards and grants ==
- Amsterdam Foundation for the Arts, Stefan and Viera Frühauf Fund (Switzerland)
- KiK Foundation (Art in Kolderveen).
