= Living Streets (UK) =

UK charity for everyday walking

- Living Streets (The Pedestrians Association)
- Logo of Living Streets
- Formation: 13 August 1929; 97 years ago
- Founder: Robert Cecil and Tom Foley
- Founded at: Essex Hall, Strand, London
- Type: Nonprofit
- Registration no.: Charity 1108448; Company 05368409
- Purpose: Promote pedestrian safety
- Headquarters: 133 Whitechapel High Street, London, E1 7QA
- Region served: United Kingdom
- President: Lord Bates
- Chief Executive: Catherine Woodhead
- Board of directors: Board of trustees (14 as of 2020)
- Subsidiaries: Living Streets Services Limited (Company 07471406)
- Budget: £5.5M (2018/2019)
- Revenue: £5.6M (2018/2019)
- Staff: 82 (2018/2019)
- Volunteers: 100 (2018/2019)
- Website: www.livingstreets.org.uk
- Formerly called: The Pedestrians' Association

Living Streets is a charity from the United Kingdom. Their goal is to promote pedestrian safety. It was founded in 1929 as the Pedestrians' Association and became known as the Pedestrians' Association for Road Safety in 1952. The current name was adopted in 2001. It is a voting member of the International Federation of Pedestrians.

== History ==
In the late 1920's, a young journalist, Tom Foley, became aware of the issue of road safety and contacted Viscount Cecil of Chelwood who was also increasingly concerned about the subject. Together they formed the Pedestrians' Association and its first meeting was held in 1929. This was announced: The Association was formed at a meeting held in the Essex Hall, London, on 13 August 1929. The meeting was convened jointly by Messrs J.J. Bailey and T.C. Foley, and was done by private invitation to people who had written to Viscount Cecil about pedestrians' grievances or who had written to T.C. Foley following a letter he had sent to the press.

The Pedestrians' Association explained its purpose as follows: in view of the serious danger of motor traffic today, an association be formed for the defence of public rights, especially of pedestrians.

Viscount Cecil of Chelwood, who was president from 1929 until 1944, was a high profile peer and had established the League of Nations. He was awarded the Nobel Peace Prize in 1937.

The following year the Road Traffic Act 1930 removed the existing 20 mph speed limit for motor cars at a time when UK road casualties were running at a rate of 7,000 per year (which is over four times the current rate). They also helped write the very first Highway Code which was first published in full in 1934.

During the 1930s its campaigns helped to persuade the British Government to introduce the driving test, to reinstate a speed limit for motorcars, and provide pedestrian crossings. A speed limit of 30 mph in urban areas and for driving tests was within the Road Traffic Act 1934, passed under Leslie Hore-Belisha, the-then Minister of Transport.

As a result of lobbying during World War II, the association lobbied the government to amend its regulations to allow pedestrians to carry a small hand torch and to paint the sides of the road white, to increase pedestrian safety.

In 1950, following his retirement from politics, Hore-Belisha was made vice-president and in 1952 the organisation changed its name to the Pedestrians' Association for Road Safety. The organisation changed its name to Living Streets in 2001.

== Activities ==
The charity has around 60 local branches and affiliated groups across the UK, and also undertakes consultancy work for local authorities.

=== Walk to school campaign ===
The charity is best known for its Walk to School campaign, which has been going for over 20 years and supports over one million children in 4000 schools to walk more. Living Streets' WOW – year-round walk to school challenge and Walk to School Week make up the campaign, which is one of the UK’s leading behaviour change campaigns for young people.

On average, WOW encourages 23% more primary school children to walk to school and reduces congestion by 30% outside the school gates. Children love to take part in the challenge which sees them rewarded with badges.

==== National Walking Month ====
Every May, Living Streets raises the profile of walking with its National Walking Month campaign. The campaign usually encourages people to #Try20 – that is fit 20 minutes more walking into each day throughout May. The charity highlights the benefits of walking on health, the environment and local economies. Key ambassadors to the month include Kate Humble.

=== Other campaigns ===
Other high profile campaigns the charity has played an integral part in, include a recent appeal to all London Mayoral candidates (2015) to pedestrianise Oxford Street. Mayor Sadiq Khan has committed to carrying out this work by 2020.

Living Streets has also campaigned, along with the Guide Dogs, on ending pavement parking. The charity in Scotland supported the introduction of a national prohibition of pavement parking on Scotland in 2024.

== Awards ==
The annual Charles Maher Award recognises an individual or organisation that has championed walking in their community. The award was set up in honour of Charles Mayer, a campaigner and longstanding supporter of Living Streets.

Awardees:

2019 – Brenda Puech, Living Streets local campaigner and Local Group Chair, based in Hackney

2018 – Alison Blamire, Causey Development Trust

2017 – Morag Rose, Loiterers' Resistance Movement

2016

2015 – Holly Newby

== See also ==
- Reclaim the Streets
- Refuge island
- Road traffic safety
- Street reclamation
- Turning Point (documentary)
- Urban vitality
- Walkability
- Walking audit
- Walking city
