= Stacy Makishi =

Hawaiian-born performance artist

Stacy Makishi is a Hawaiian-born performance artist, physical theatre and live art specialist. Her work often involves combining autobiographical experience and comedy with inspiration from fictional sources, such as Hollywood movies or novels. She has been identified by The Guardian as part of a new generation of artists making 'innovative shows [ . . .] with and by young people'.

== Biography ==
Makishi was born in Hawaii, and graduated from the University of Hawaii. She appeared in stage and TV productions there, including plays by Hawaiian playwright Edward Sakamoto and a TV series based on Pidgin to Da Max.

Makishi moved to California, and worked at the Comedy Store as a stand-up comic. She moved to London after working with Split Britches theatre company in New York.

in 2019 she became the second recipient of the Live Art Development Agency's Arthole award, which provides artists with £10,000 to undertake a research and artistic development programme of their own design. Upon receiving the award, Makishi noted that making Live Art is

Like living inside a hole. An ass hole. An art hole. Yes. Art is in that hole. With this Arthole, I will have time and resources to: make it, avoid it, study it, wrestle it, do it, explore it, hate it and love it. I hope to learn a lot while I’m down in my hole … and look forward to share whatever I learn with you.

== Productions ==
Tongue in Sheets (1994) premiered at the WOW Cafe, in July 1994. The one-woman show served as Makishi's debut in New York City.

Salad of the Bad Café (1999) is a cabaret written by Makishi, Peggy Shaw, and Lois Weaver. It uses the lives of Tennessee Williams and Yukio Mishima as inspiration to explore themes around race, gender and regional stereotypes. Carson McCullers' 1951 novella The Ballad of the Sad Café is a key area of inspiration for the piece.

Love Letters to Francis (2009) with Nick Parish, was commissioned by the TATE and B3 Media. The piece was inspired by the painter Francis Bacon.

The Making of Bull: The True Story (2010–2013) is based upon the Coen Brothers' film Fargo (1996). She created a solo show which centred around the film, telling the story through themes of deceit versus truth with comedy and pranks. The performance toured the UK, New York, Turkey, Amsterdam, Vienna and Slovenia.

Makishi created a large scale audio walk called And The Stars Down So Close that took place in Islington in 2012. The walk refers to John Steinbeck's novel Grapes of Wrath, using immersive multi-media and installation. This piece was in collaboration with artists Vick Ryder, Lisa Asagi and Will Munroe.

The Falsettos (2013) by Makishi uses the HBO series The Sopranos’ fictional character Tony Soprano to tell her experience with menopause. She collaborated with Peggy Shaw, Joshua Sofaer, Lois Weaver and Vick Ryder. E.T. the Extra-Terrestrial and Barbra Streisand are both further influences for the solo piece. It premièred at the Chelsea Theatre and toured across the UK and BRUT in Vienna. The performance works alongside Claire Nolan's documentary The Making of The Falsettos.

Under The Covers (2015) is a performance directed by Makishi with Nathaniel J Hall and Nathan Crosson-Smith and produced by Contact. It explores the attitudes of young people towards sex, "questioning myths and breaking down taboos." The piece was supported by Wellcome Collection as it toured the UK as part of SICK! Festival.

References to the 1851 novel Moby-Dick by Herman Melville are seen in her solo performance Vesper Time (2015–2017). The piece tackles mourning and paternal absence through the use of pop songs and religious imagery. The piece was supported by the National Theatre Studio and was funded by the National Lottery through the Arts Council. It was commissioned by Chelsea Theatre and Colchester Arts Centre.

The Comforter (2017–2018) draws inspiration from American Drama series Twin Peaks, Ingmar Bergman and '80s and '90s pop culture in her solo piece. It was funded by the National Lottery through the Arts Council England and commissioned by The Yard Theatre, Marlborough Theatre, Norwich Arts Centre and Colchester Arts Centre.

== Awards ==
- Live Art Development Agency, Arthole Artists Award (2019)
  - 'The Award supports groundbreaking and inspirational UK-based artists working in Live Art with £10,000 to undertake a self determined research and artistic development programme'.
- ICA Attached Artist Award
- Millennium Fellowship Award
- Franklin Furnace Award (1999)
  - 'new technology commission for a live worldwide netcast called "Suicide for Beginners" (1999) which included animation, video, text, music and performance'.

== Publications ==
- "Italics" by Makishi, S., 2010, Studies in Theatre & Performance, vol. 30, no. 1, pp. 63–66.
- "Stay!" by Vicky Ryder, Lisa Asagi and Stacy Makishi, in Animal Acts: performing species today
- Writing Space: The First Project collaboratively with Emma Bennett, Sarah Dickenson, Claire MacDonald, Michael Pinchbeck, Tanya Ronder, Cathy Turner and Steve Waters.
