= McDonough Museum of Art =

- Established: 1991
- Location: 525 Wick Avenue; Youngstown, Ohio, United States
- Coordinates: 41.1050°N 80.6450°W
- Type: Museum of Art
- Director: Claudia Berlinski
- Website: mcdonoughmuseum.ysu.edu

The McDonough Museum of Art is a center for contemporary art located in Youngstown, Ohio, US, on the campus of Youngstown State University (YSU). Opened in 1991 in a building designed by Gwathmey Siegel & Associates Architects, the museum focuses on contemporary art through exhibits and art education. The origins of the museum begin in 1986 through the donations and efforts of local physician and art collector John J. McDonough, who used proceeds from the sale of his painting Gloucester Harbor by Childe Hassam to fund construction. Along with the proceeds from McDonough, Attorney Paul M. Dutton and the State of Ohio assisted in the effort to finally begin construction in the fall of 1990.

The museum features changing exhibitions, installations, performances, and lectures by regional, national and international artists, and also functions as public outreach for the YSU College of Creative Arts and the Department of Art, exhibiting work by students, faculty and alumni. In addition the museum offers free lectures, performances, and programs organized in collaboration with various departments at the university and the Youngstown community at large.
