= Curtis Mitchell (artist) =

American artist

Curtis Mitchell is an artist based in New York City. Curtis Mitchell received a MA in sculpture from Goddard College in 1981 and an MFA from Yale University in 1983. Mitchell has shown his works extensively in noteworthy galleries and museums in the United States as well as around the world. He is best known for his work in sculpture, video, and constructed photography.

Mitchell has lectured widely and written essays for Arts Magazine, and the journals Lusitania, and Meaning, and for the book Art School Critique 2.0. He is also faculty at Pratt Institute and New York University.

== Work ==
Much of Curtis Mitchell's work has been inspired by icons and products of popular culture. Franklin Sirmans has noted that “Mitchell’s sustained ability to transform everyday objects and activities into visually engaging work – while using low-end materials and methods to do it – solidifies his status as an artistic alchemist with few contemporary peers.” The works are manifestations of the most conspicuous cycles of all forms of existence: the principle that sees them fall apart, reconstitute themselves, and then fall apart again.

== Exhibitions ==
Curtis Mitchell has shown in solo and group exhibitions internationally, including MoMA PS1, the New Museum, the Aldrich Contemporary Art Museum, the Mattress Factory, the Contemporary Museum Baltimore, the Atlanta Contemporary Art Center, the McDonough Museum of Art, the Landesmuseum Joanneum in Austria, and the Hall of Art, Budapest (Műcsarnok Kunsthalle in Hungarian).

He has also exhibited in numerous notable galleries, including but not limited to Andrea Rosen Gallery, Bomb (magazine), and White Columns.

== Collections ==
Mitchell’s work is represented in major museums and public collections, including the Museum of Modern Art, the Walker Art Center, the Mattress Factory, the Sculpture Center in Cleveland, Ohio, the Museum of Fine Arts, Boston, the Lannan Foundation, and the New York Public Library.

== Awards and Grants ==
He is the recipient of awards including the Foundation for Contemporary Arts, Adolph and Esther Gottlieb Foundation grant, and the Pollock-Krasner Foundation.
