= Sara Wookey =

American Dance Artist

Sara Wookey is an American dance artist who gained dual citizenship in Britain in 2022. She is a dance scholar and advisor currently based in Cambridge, UK. She specialises in relational artistic practices as a means to creating more inclusive museum and other public sector spaces and in dance transmission as a form of embodied archiving practices in dance. She holds a B.F.A. in Dance from Ohio State University, and an M.F.A. in Dance from UCLA. In 2020 she completed her Doctoral thesis Spatial Relations: Dance in the Changing Museum through the Centre for Dance Research (C-DaRE) at Coventry University. Her practice informed research explores social and spatial politics, taking dance and choreography as tools for understanding systems of power.

== Practitioner Research ==
Wookey is a Senior Post Doctoral Researcher at the University of Antwerp in the Centre for Visual Poetics at the University of Antwerp, supervised by Prof. Dr Timmy De Laet. Her research as a dance scholar is in sustainable dance heritage. She was the first Practitioner Researcher at the MUNCH in Oslo. There she researched the value of participatory programmes and practice research in the museum through the lens of social choreography. (). This work has been influenced by her long-time affiliation with and working experience with former Head of Research at TATE, Emily Pringle.

Lectures given by Wookey in relation to her work with dance heritage and as a transmitter of dance include Dance is Hard to See, Tanzhaus Zürich, September 15, 2024 and Muscle Memory: A Conversation about Trio A with Yvonne Rainer and Sara Wookey, in 2025, along with Gregor Quack, curator and dancers, Fred Gehrig, Emily Ranford, and Esther Cowens. Yvonne Rainer's 'Trio A' performance-lecture w/ Sara Wookey 2014 at PICA Performance Space

Much of Wookey's own practice is closely connected to her work in the Netherlands in the 1990s, American Post-Modern dance and European contexts for dance. Her practice is closely connected to ideas of transmission, value and language.

== Affiliations ==
As an Affiliate Researcher with the Minderoo Centre for Technology & Democracy (2023-2025) and Associate Researcher (2024-Present) at Robinson College at the University of Cambridge Wookey is exploring ways that her practice research in cultural spaces and embodied knowledge can contribute to more equitable developments in AI.

== Choreography ==
Much of Wookey's own practice is closely connected to her work in the Netherlands in the 1990s, American Post-Modern dance and European contexts for dance. Her practice is closely connected to ideas of transmission, value and language.

In "Disappearing Acts & Resurfacing Subjects: Concerns of (a) Dance Artist(s)" (2014) Wookey meditated on dance as an ephemeral dance form and questioned what this meant for institutions as well as for the dancer's themselves. In the work, Wookey referenced her own previous choreographies, her work with Rainer, direct address, use of props and video to create an independent performance work. Her 2013 project, reDance, featured re-enacted works and processes of renowned choreographers of the Judson Dance Theater.

Wookey established herself as a young choreographer in the Netherlands where she was based between 1996-2006. There she was supported by grants from the Netherlands Funds for the Performing Arts and Amsterdam Funds for the Arts, among others. Danswerkplaats Amsterdam (now Dansmakers), a dance house, administered her projects. She created over a dozen evening-length dance works that toured in Europe and North America. Her solo work "Disappearing Acts & Resurfacing Subjects: Concerns of (a) Dance Artist(s)" (2014) premiered at the New Museum, NYC as part of the Performance Archiving Performance program. She has been creating dance films, including reMake at Lakeland Arts with a grant from Arts Council England and more recently collaborated with her lifetime partner Christian Kipp on a dance film called UmWelt (2023) made in the north of Sweden as part of Moskosel artist residency.

== Civic Art Projects in Los Angeles ==
From 2008-2014 Wookey worked as an artist in Los Angeles, California. She worked on several collaborative projects namely Being Pedestrian with artist Sara Daleiden. From 2012-2014 Wookey was a consultant with the Creative Services Department at the Los Angeles County Metropolitan Transportation Authority, where she designed Metro Art Moves You artist-led tours of public art along Los Angeles's light rail lines.

There she taught at the California Institute of the Arts (CalArts) and initiated a partnership between CalArts and the Community Redevelopment Agency of Los Angeles where art students proposed creative civic projects to urban planners and stakeholders in downtown Los Angeles.

== Museum Projects ==
Wookey has been engaged with museums since the late 1990s presenting her work, engaging in learning programs and lecturing. Notable projects include: "Punt.Point" a commission to create a collaborative directed performance score for the Van Abbemuseum (commissioned by, then, Head of Collections Christine Berndes. The project was co-created with landscape architect Rennie Tang and designer Gabriele Baka. The work is now part of the permanent collection of the museum (acquired in 2017) Archival research materials are publicly available in the library of the Van Abbe. Another significant work was "Performing Navigations: (Re)Mapping the Museum" (2010) at the Hammer Museum and "Punt.Point" (2014) at van Abbe Museum in the Netherlands. which is part of the permanent collection being purchased in 2017.

== Yvonne Rainer ==
Wookey has studied with, been mentored by, and co-taught with choreographer and filmmaker Yvonne Rainer. In 2010 Wookey became one of eight dance artists certified by Rainer to stage/transmit and perform her iconic work "Trio A" (1966). Since then, Wookey has staged the work at international venues including, most recently, Neue Nationalgalerie Berlin (September 2024) as part of Berlin Arts Week and at Tate Modern (July 2026) as part of Trio A's 60-year Anniversary. Reviews of the Tate event were published by The Guardian, The Observer, and Fjord with a preview in Dance Magazine including interviews with Rainer and dancer/choreographer and stager Pat Catterson.

In 2024 Wookey was invited by Ula Sniegowska, Artistic Director of the American Film Festival in Wroclaw, Poland to stage "M-Walk - (Street Action)" (1970) by Rainer, working with local dancers as part of the New Horizon Festival in which Rainer's films were being featured.

As a dancer Wookey has performed with Rainer a version of Trio A that Rainer titled Trio A: Pressured Reversed and Revisited in 2014 at the "Dancing with the Art World" symposium at the Hammer Museum. And as part of Yvonne Rainer: Dance Works at Raven Row gallery in London (2014), Wookey performed in other works of Rainer's (staged by Rainer and Catterson) including "Diagonal (part of Terrain)" (1963), "Chair Pillow" (1969), and "Talking Solo (part of Terrain)" (1963).

== Activism ==
Wookey actively advocates for the rights of dance artists. In 2011 she auditioned for Marina Abramović's An Artist's LIfe's Manifesto"—a group performance work created by Abramovic for the 2011 Annual Gala at the Museum of Contemporary Art, Los Angeles.

Wookey declined to the offer to participate after realizing that the compensation provided was not sufficient and conditions questionable, following up the invitation with an open letter to artists.

Since then Wookey has continued to speak out for fair compensation and treatment of performance artists. More recent publications include: Disappearing Acts & Resurfacing Subjects: Concerns of (a) Dance Artist(s) in The Ethics of Art: Ecological Turns in the Performing Arts edited by Guy Cools and Pascal Gielen (2015) and published by Valiz Press and Collective Thinking.

== Services ==
As part of her activist-inspired work Wookey offers services to individuals, organisations, businesses and boards through her company Wookey Works, based at Carrow House in Norwich, UK. She offers coaching and mentoring, advise and evaluation, access support through Arts Council England and financial literacy workshops. She also teaches dance and yoga for local communities.
