= Sara Roque =

Métis/Ojibwe filmmaker and activist

Sara Roque (died 7 June 2023) was a filmmaker, advocate and community activist. She was a mixed-heritage Anishinaabekwe woman from the community of Shebahonaning (known as Killarney, Ontario) and lived in Toronto. She co-founded O'Kaadenigan Weengashk, an Indigenous women's art collective, in 2004.

== Career ==
Roque worked for over a decade as Indigenous Arts Officer at the Ontario Arts Council, becoming a powerful community advocate across the province and nationally, mentoring for First Nation artists, building innovative programs, policies and protocols with Indigenous peoples.

Roque was a longterm member of the Indigenous Education Council at OCAD University, a founding member of both O'Kaadenigan Wiingashk, an Indigenous women's arts collective in Peterborough, and The Good Medicine Collective in Toronto.

The Seeds of Change collection, co-curated in 2018 by Roque and Nêhiyaw artist and curator Elwood Jimmy, is a gallery of artworks by Indigenous women and 2 spirits for Women's College Hospital. The collection became "an important addition to Indigenous Health education at WCH", showcasing "the power of Indigenous art to not only create a more welcoming space for Indigenous patients, health care providers and students but to assert Indigenous world views on medicine and healing in the Western health care system."

In 2010 Roque directed Six Miles Deep - a groundbreaking film about the work of female community leaders during the 2006 Caledonia blockade. The film details the communities' struggle to resist real-estate development on land formally granted to them under the 1784 Haldimand Proclamation.

== Six Miles Deep ==
After many years of war, the Haldimand Proclamation was offered in 1784 by Sir Fredrick Haldimand to the Six Nations of the Grand River, grateful for their support of the British against American revolutionaries. The proclamation made a perpetual promise of the lands six miles deep on both sides of the Grand River to the Mohawk Nation and the Six Nation Indians: "I have at the earnest desire of many of these His Majesty's faithful Allies purchased a tract of land from the Indians situated between the Lakes Ontario, Erie and Huron, and I do hereby in His Majesty's name authorize and permit the said Mohawk Nation and such others of the Six Nation Indians as wish to settle in that quarter to take possession of and settle upon the Banks of the River commonly called Ouse or Grand River, running into Lake Erie, allotting to them for that purpose six miles deep from each side of the river beginning at Lake Erie and extending in that proportion to the head of the said river, which them and their posterity are to enjoy for ever." Ownership of this land is still contested by the governments of Canada and Ontario, see the Haudenosaunee Confederacy Chiefs Council (HCCC), and at Six Nations land rights. Since 1995 the Six Nations of the Grand River have been litigating the governments of Canada and Ontario for this treaty to be upheld and have made the court documents available for all to read.

The Caledonia Blockade in 2006, alternatively known as the Grand River land dispute made national and international headlines for its peaceful and persistent refusal. There are 28 land claims by Six Nations still outstanding.

Sara Roque centred the matriarchal leadership of the Six Nations in her film Six Miles Deep, her documentary sharing their resolute and collective resistance to attempted land dispossession. Roque's work forms part of an important constellation of Indigenous female documentary filmmakers, who include Alanis Obomsawin, a group of voices gaining global recognition.

== Awards ==
2010 DOXA Documentary Film Festival - Honourable Mention for the Colin Low Award for Six Miles Deep

The Office National du Filme & National Film Board of Canada produced a Study Guide on Six Miles Deep as part of their Reconciliation through Film programme.

== Impact ==
Six Miles Deep brought national attention to the 2006 Caledonia Blockade and centred on the models of female Indigenous leadership, which historically had been dismantled by colonisers when they arrived in Ontario.

The film forms part of many film programmes nationally as part of the prestigious Universities Study Guide.

Various screenings included the Coady Institute, OCAD University and the Gimme Some Truth Festival - "Six Miles Deep is an inspiring and compelling portrait of a group of women whose actions have led a cultural re-awakening in their traditionally matriarchal community".

== Personal life ==
Sara Roque married Andrew Balfour (Fisher River First Nation), Composer and Artistic Director of Camerata Nova, Winnipeg in 2021.
