= Red shirt (photography) =

Trend in photography using colorful items such as clothes

The red shirt school of photography is a trend which first became popular in the 1950s. It was pioneered by National Geographic photographers, who had subjects wear, or chose subjects who wore overly colorful clothes (not necessarily of red, though red was preferred as it rendered best on Kodachrome film). The earliest use of such techniques can be traced back to autochrome pioneers of the 1920s - like Gervais Courtellement - who worked on National Geographic assignments worldwide. Originally meant to describe the work of many of the National Geographic photographers of the late 1950s and early 1960s, the term is loosely applied to the creation of any such images.

Even though Kodachrome was already unnaturally bright, photographers ... splashed the strongest possible colors in their pictures so that they would be more effective in print. One result was that the staff photographers - who were constantly being sent to colorful places to slake what was seen as the public's unquenching thirst for colorful scenes - would often find themselves needing more color to take advantage of the color film and would resort to placing people in costume.

As color photography became popular and commonplace, color frequently became an important criterion while choosing subjects to photograph, or for selecting from previously photographed images. Photographers would thus not only choose colorful scenes, but put colorfully costumed people in them.

The method is especially popular in brightening up photographs with drab or earth-toned backgrounds, or to focus attention on a subject. Hence, it is popular mainly in landscape photography, but has use in portrait photography as well, for example in National Geographic photographs of the Maasai people of Africa, who traditionally wear a red robe.

This method grew increasingly popular as color photography technology improved, and was spurred on by color film companies like Kodak. It received a boost with the spread of digital photography, as digital photographs can be easily enhanced by differential color saturation treatments on different parts of the image.

The technique has influenced numerous trends in contemporary photography, such as advertising photography, where it is used to highlight the advertised object in question. An extreme variation of the red shirt school is focal color photography, where optical and/or digital photographic filters are used to preserve color in only a single focal object or region of the photograph.

The term is sometimes also used in a deprecating sense, to convey a feeling of "set up" or tailored imagery. Such photographs have often been considered inferior, lacking originality or being non-notable, and criticism has often been targeted at National Geographic photographers in general. Ed Hannigan wrote:

National Geographic's pictures, with rare exception, were all pretty much of the picture postcard type of idealistic beauty, rather than photojournalism.

This era culminated in what critics and detractors outside the National Geographic Society called the red shirt school of photography - the consistent use of red shirts, caps, and other apparel as props to brighten up photographs.

The red shirt school probably came to be associated strongly with National Geographic not only due to society policy, but also because National Geographic was one of the first periodicals to regularly publish in color. A quote from National Geographic photographer Luis Marden:

The red shirt came to be associated with the Geographic because very few but the Geographic published color. It's easy to criticise the past - the trouble is we're doing it by today's standards.

The style should not be confused with commercial photography campaigns which highlight a color to draw attention as well as for brand association. Cases in point are Tiffany and Co.'s "blue box" advertising campaign, and The Coca-Cola Company's red and white, originally hand-painted Christmas advertisement campaigns.
