= Kubra Khademi =

Afghan performance artist based in Paris (born 1989)

Kubra Khademi (born 1989) is an Afghan performance artist based in Paris. She studied fine arts at Kabul University before attending Beaconhouse National University in Lahore, Pakistan on a scholarship. In Lahore she began to create public performances, a practice she continued upon her return to Kabul, where her work actively responded to a society dominated by extreme patriarchal politics. After performing her piece Armor in 2015, Khademi was forced to flee Afghanistan due to a fatwa and death threats. She is currently living and working in Paris.

== Work ==
Through her practice, Khademi explores her life as a refugee and a woman.

=== Kubra & Pedestrian Sign/Kubra et les bonhommes piétons (2016) ===
In this video work Khademi walks the streets of Paris dressed as a pedestrian crossing sign. In place of green or red male figure, Khademi's crossing sign displays a female figure. The costume consists of a black dress and a light up pedestrian box affixed to her head; in the piece Khademi is seen standing next to street signs and adding the female figure to the urban landscape.

=== Eternal trial (2015) ===
Eternal Trial is a video performance that consists of a long shot of Khademi walking through an empty field in Noyers, France. As she comes closer to the camera, it is revealed that she is picking poppies off a white dress and discarding them in the field behind her.

=== Armor (2015) ===
In 2015, Khademi walked along a Kabul street dressed in custom-made metal armour which emphasised her breasts, buttocks, and groin. Underneath the armour, Khademi wore a traditional hijab. Though the work was originally planned to have a twenty minute duration, Khademi was forced to abort the performance after only eight minutes and to seek refuge in a friend's car.

The project was inspired by Kubra's personal experiences of harassment, both on the particular Kabul street where she staged the work, and in general since her childhood. Through the project she hoped to address the sexual harassment women in Afghanistan face on a daily basis. Khademi has stated that the performance explored her life as a woman and the limitations that come with being a woman in Afghanistan. After the performance, Khademi received many threats and abusive messages. As a result, she was forced to flee Afghanistan by foot, and is currently living in exile in France. For Khademi, the result of her project emphasised the problems of extreme patriarchy and social imbalance in Afghan society.

== Reception ==
After fleeing Afghanistan and settling in France, Khademi was awarded an MFA scholarship at Pantheon Sorbonne University and was given the title of Chevalier de l’Ordre des Arts et Letter by the Ministry of French Culture.

She was a featured artist at WALKING WOMEN (2016), presented by the Walking Artists Network at Somerset House in London.
