= Serena Korda =

British artist

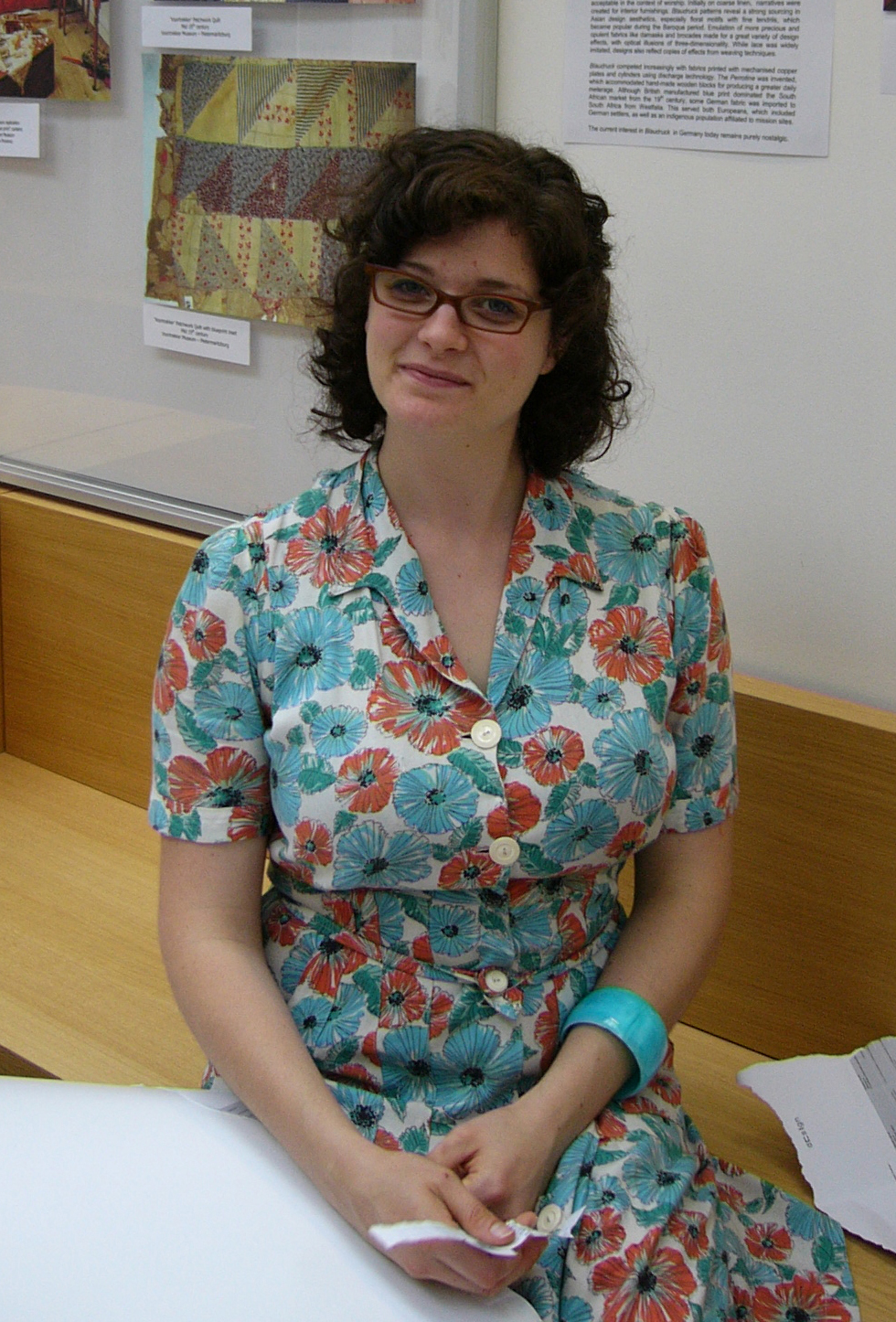
Korda in 2005

Serena Korda (born 1979) is a British visual artist. She has made work across a number of disciplines including performance, sculpture, ceramics and public art. Her work is interactive and encourages people to explore everyday rituals found from histories and conversations with one another. She encourages her audience to interact and be involved in creating these shared experiences that would usually be passed by.

== Early life ==
Serena Korda was born in 1979 in London, England. She studied at Middlesex University, and received her Master of Arts degree in Printmaking from the Royal College of Art, RCA, in 2009. While attending the RCA, Korda won the Deutsche Bank Art Award (2009).

== Exhibitions and commissions ==
Korda's 2008 work The Answer Lies at the End of the Line: was commissioned by London's Art on the Underground and presented in London's Stanmore tube station. The work used banners to invite travellers to solve a puzzle, in reference to the 57 Turing Bombes located in Stanmore during World War II.

In 2011, Korda was commissioned by the Wellcome Collection to create Laid to Rest, as part of the exhibition Dirt: the filthy reality of everyday life. The work employed five hundred handmade bricks, mixed with a variety of substances including human skin and gorilla fur.

In 2013, Korda exhibited her work Aping the Beast at the Camden Arts Centre and Grundy Art Gallery, Blackpool. The first performance as part of Aping the Beast included a ritual performed by 25 local school children dressed as ‘Boggarts’ – characters from Lancashire folklore. The performance was accompanied by live music from Grumbling Fur.

In 2016–2017, Korda was the Norma Lipman & BALTIC Fellow in Ceramic Sculpture at Newcastle University, a residency that culminated in a solo show at Baltic Centre for Contemporary Art entitled 'Missing Time' (2018).

'Daughters of Necessity: Serena Korda & Wakefield's Ceramics at The Hepworth Wakefield' was exhibited at The Hepworth Wakefield, December 2017–July 2018. Korda was asked to select artworks from Wakefield ceramics collection to display alongside her own new and existing works, exploring where these objects sit between function and sculpture.

In 2019, she showed her project Khaos Spirit at Somerset House London.

Korda's commissions include 'The Bell Tree' for the National Trust, Speke Hall (2018), an installation of 300 ceramic bell 'mushrooms' and soundscape audio inspired by the folklore of native bluebells that grow around the ancient oak tree in which the artwork is installed.

Other projects include W.A.M.A The Work as Movement Archive, and The Library of Secrets, a mobile library presented at the New Art Gallery in 2008. The work invited participants to leave a secret message in a book for future readers to find.

In 2022-23 her work was included in the survey show Strange Clay: Ceramics in Contemporary Art at the Hayward Gallery in London with the work And She Cried Me A River, a giant necklace for an imagined mermaid, first shown at Thomas Dane gallery, Naples in 2022.

== See also ==
- Walkwalkwalk
