= Rosana Cade =

- Education: Royal Conservatoire of Scotland
- Awards: Edinburgh Festival Fringe Award

Rosana Cade is a Glasgow-based live performance artist. They are known mainly for their queer, feminist and activist approaches to work. They are notable for winning the Edinburgh Festival Fringe Awards 2016, for Physical/Visual Theatre with Cock and Bull, and has toured work to The National Theatre, Battersea Arts Centre and international venues including Teatro Maria Matos, Lisbon, Frascati, Amsterdam and Kwai Fong Theatre, Hong Kong.

== Life ==
Cade studied BA (hons) Contemporary Performance Practice at The Royal Conservatoire of Scotland, class of 2011. Rosana co-founded//BUZZCUT// festival, a collaboration creating experimental events for live performance.

In 2016 Cade was announced as Artist in Residence at The Marlborough Theatre in Brighton.

== Key works ==
=== Walking:Holding ===
Commissioned in 2011, Walking:Holding is an experiential live performance that involves one audience member at a time. An audience member is guided through a planned route, holding hands with different people. The performance was created through 'holding hands experiments' in Glasgow with couples, of different ages, sexualities and races, and aims to challenge prejudices, with the experience of walking in someone else's shoes — or hands.

Cade's performance roots lies in the experience of lesbian, gay and bisexual people. Walking:Holding's audience members are local participants who range in age, gender, race, sexuality and background. Walking: Holding foregrounds their sexuality and strives to align their work with both the terms ‘queer’ and ‘lesbian'

=== The Making of Pinocchio (Cade & MacAskill) ===
Cade collaborated with their partner Ivor MacAskill to create The Making of Pinocchio, which was described by The Guardian as "a funny, clever and thoughtful two-hander, rich in playful imagery and direct-to-camera asides, about identity, definition and acceptance." The performance was featured in festivals such as LIFT (London International Festival of Theatre) and Take Me Somewhere (Glasgow).

=== Academic articles ===
Walking:Holding has been discussed in academic articles and book chapters, including:

- Rauch, Bill; Carey, Alison (2016). Svich, Caridad (ed.). Audience Revolution: Dispatches from the Field. Theatre Communications Group. ISBN 9781559368643.
- Mullan, Sarah (2021). "Post-lesbian? Gendering Queer Performance Research". In Clare, David; McDonagh, Fiona; Nakase, Justine (eds.). The Golden Thread: Irish Women Playwrights, Volume 2 (1992-2016). Liverpool University Press. ISBN 9781800858596.

== Other works ==
Sister has been developed in association with The Arches, and with support from the National Theatre Studio and Battersea Arts Centre. It premiered at Behaviour 2014 and is part of the Made in Scotland Showcase.

== Awards ==
- Athena Award via New Moves International for Walking:Holding in 2011
- (2016) Edinburgh Festival Fringe Awards Physical/Visual Theatre Winner Cock and Bull, Athena Award for Walking:Holding 2011
- Artsadmin New Work Award 2014
