= Clare Qualmann =

British performance artist

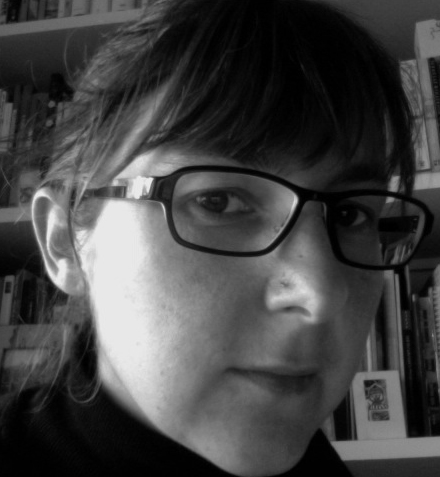
Qualmann in 2011

Clare Qualmann is a British multi-media performance artist based in London, UK. She is a senior lecturer in performing arts at the University of East London and also teaches at London Metropolitan University.

== Career ==
Qualmann's work uses a range of participatory methods to explore the routines and narratives of everyday life. A large body of her work focuses on the practice of walking as a way to interrogate the familiarity of place and has been described as “a kind of anti-dérive”.

Qualmann is a member of walkwalkwalk with Gail Burton and Serena Korda, who practice "'an archaeology of the familiar and forgotten," organising public walks through familiar places deemed marginal or overlooked.

As a solo artist Qualmann has further developed her walking practice. Qualmann is a founding member of the international Walking Artists Network, created in 2007. Through the network Qualmann has organised numerous walking research events and exhibitions, including the Step by Step seminar series at the University of East London, the footwork research group, and Where To? Towards the Future Steps of Walking at Falmouth University with Misha Myers.

=== Selected exhibitions ===
- Collect Transform Repeat (2007) Michael West Gallery, Isle of Wight
- Spinning Stories (2008), with Emily Butterworth and The Woman's Library
  - on the role of, and places associated, with laundry in women's lives.
- Untitled (Pencil on cotton handkerchief) (2009), Flash Company , Cecil Sharp House, London
- Perambulator (2014), Deveron Arts Walking Institute, Huntly
- East End Jam (2015), Queen Elizabeth Olympic Park, London Legacy Development Corporation
- Chinese Whispers (2015), part of Exeter University's Gossip and Nonsense.

=== With walk walk walk ===
- Chip Shop Tour of E8 (2007), E8- The Heart of Hackney, Transition Gallery, London
- Nightwalks (2008), Stories from the Exeter Archive
- walk walk walk (2013), Walk On: 40 Years of Walking, Pitshangar Manor Gallery, Northern Gallery of Contemporary Art, mac Birmingham, Plymouth City Museum and Gallery
- walk walk walk: stories from the Bethnal Green archive (2010), a permanent installation in the Bethnal Green Old Town Hall.

== Selected publications ==
- Clare Qualmann and Claire Hind (eds.) (2015) Ways to Wander. Axminster: Triarchy.
- Gail Burton, Serena Korda, and Clare Qualmann (2009) Walkwalkwalk: Stories from the Exeter Archive. London: Site Projects.
- Elizabeth LeMoine, Clare Qualmann and Susan Skingle (2006) Collect Transform Repeat. London: Site Projects.
