= Deirdre Heddon =

Deirdre Heddon (born 1969), is Professor of Contemporary Performance at the University of Glasgow (UK). She is a practice-based researcher and has published articles in peer-reviewed journals, as well as academic monographs and book-chapters. Her focus of interest is in autobiographical performance, site-specific performance and walking art.

== Career ==
Heddon is the author of multiple books, book chapters and journal articles. She authored Autobiography and Performance, and co-author of Devising Performance: A Critical History (both published by Palgrave Macmillan). Her edited collection, Histories and Practices of Live Art, co-edited with Jennie Klein, was published in 2012 by Palgrave Macmillan.

Heddon has written a number of texts about walking and performance, and is connected with the Walking Artists Network. She contributed a chapter to Walking, Writing and Performance: Autobiographical Texts, and has written a number of articles about walking and performance, including, ‘Walking and Friendship’ (2012); Walking Women: Interviews with Artists on the Move; Women Walking: Shifting the Tales and Scales of Mobility (2012), with Cathy Turner; and The Horizon of Sound: Soliciting the Earwitness (2010). She also co-edited a themed edition of RIDE: A Journal of Applied Drama, which focused on applied theatre and environmentalism (2012). Heddon is co-editing a newly launched series for Palgrave Macmillan, Performing Landscapes, for which she is writing Performing Landscapes: Forests.

== Practice-based Research ==
Heddon undertakes practice-based research, much of it in relation to walking. Her project, Walking Interconnections, extends her interest in walking and environmentalism to questions around disability as well. With Misha Myers she created The Walking Library (2012-ongoing), an artwork and research project that 'brings libraries into the landscape through site-specific walks.'^{:287} In recognition of her fortieth birthday she devised 40 Walks, for which she organised forty walks with forty different people.

== Selected publications ==
Articles:

- Heddon, D. (2016) Engaging arts, impacting PaR. Studies in Theatre and Performance, 36(1), pp. 79–87. (doi:10.1080/14682761.2015.1111016)
- Heddon, D. (2015) Going for a walk: a verbatim play. Studies in Theatre and Performance, 35(3), pp. 177–188. 10.1080/14. (doi:10.1080/14682761.2015.1067387)
- Heddon, D., and Myers, M. (2014) Stories from the walking library. Cultural Geographies, 21(4), pp. 639–655. (doi:10.1177/1474474014521361)
- Heddon, D., and Myers, M. (2013) The Walking Library. [Blog],
- Heddon, D., and Mackey, S. (2012) Environmentalism, performance and applications: uncertainties and emancipations. Research in Drama Education, 17(2), pp. 163–192. (doi:10.1080/13569783.2012.670421)
- Heddon, D. (2012) Turning 40: 40 turns. Walking & friendship. Performance Research, 17(2), pp. 67–75. (doi:10.1080/13528165.2012.671075)
- Heddon, D., Iball, H., and Zerihan, R. (2012) Come closer: confessions of intimate spectators in one to one performance. Contemporary Theatre Review, 22(1), pp. 120–133. (doi:10.1080/10486801.2011.645233)
- Heddon, D., and Turner, C. (2012) Walking women: shifting the tales and scales of mobility. Contemporary Theatre Review, 22(2), pp. 224–236. (doi:10.1080/10486801.2012.666741)
- Heddon, D., and Howells, A. (2011) From talking to silence: a confessional journey. PAJ: A Journal of Performance and Art, 33(1), pp. 1–12. (doi:10.1162/PAJJ_a_00018)
- Heddon, D. (2010) The horizon of sound: soliciting the earwitness. Performance Research, 15(3), pp. 36–42. (doi:10.1080/13528165.2010.527200)
- Heddon, D., and Kelly, A. (2010) Distance dramaturgy. Performance Research, 20(2), pp. 214–220. (doi:10.1080/10486801003682427)
- Heddon, D., and Turner, C. (2010) Walking women: interviews with artists on the move. Performance Research, 15(4), pp. 14–22. (doi:10.1080/13528165.2010.539873)
- Heddon, D. (2009) 40 Walks Blog. [Blog],
- Heddon, D. (2007) Ac/counting the I's. Research in Drama Education, 12(2), pp. 207–222. (doi:10.1080/13569780701321203)
- Heddon, D. (2007) One square foot: thousands of routes. PAJ: A Journal of Performance and Art, 29(2), pp. 40–50. (doi:10.1162/pajj.2007.29.2.40)
- Heddon, D. (2003) Glory box: Tim Miller's autobiography of the future. New Theatre Quarterly, 19(3), pp. 243–256. (doi:/10.1017/S0266464X03000149)
- Heddon, D. (2002) Following in the footsteps... Performance Research, 7(4),
- Heddon, D. (2002) Performing the archive: following in the footsteps. Performance Research, 7(4), pp. 64–77.
- Heddon, D. (2002) Autotopography: graffiti, landscapes and selves. Reconstruction: Studies in Contemporary Culture, 2(3),
- Heddon, D. (2002) Performing the self. M/C Journal, 5(5),
- Heddon, D. (1998) What's in a name? Studies in Theatre Production, 18, pp. 49–59.

Books:

- Heddon, D., and Milling, J. (2015) Devising Performance: A Critical History, 2nd Edition. Series: Theatre and performance practices. Palgrave Macmillan: London. ISBN 9781137426772
- Heddon, D., Lavery, C., and Smith, P. (2009) Walking, Writing and Performance: Autobiographical Texts. Intellect Books: Bristol. ISBN 9781841501550
- Heddon, D.E. (2007) Autobiography and Performance. Palgrave Macmillan. ISBN 9780230537538
- Heddon, D., and Milling, J. (2005) Devising Performance: A Critical History. Palgrave. ISBN 1403906637

Book sections:

- Heddon, D. (2016) Con-versing: listening, speaking, turning. In: Bastian, M., Jones, O., Moore, N. and Roe, E. (eds.) More-Than-Human Participatory Research. Series: Routledge studies in human geography. Routledge: London. ISBN 9781138957350 (Accepted for Publication)
- Heddon, D. (2015) Hand in Hand. In: Campbell, A. and Farrier, S. (eds.) Queer Dramaturgies: International Perspectives on Where Performance Leads Queer. Palgrave Macmillan: London. ISBN 9781137411839
- Heddon, D. (2015) The cultivation of entangled listening: an ensemble of more-than-human participants. In: Nicholson, H. and Harpin, A. (eds.) Performance and Participation: Practices, Audiences, Politics. Palgrave Macmillan:
- Heddon, D. (2015) Making it up. In: Carter, P. and Laing, S. (eds.) Paul Bright’s Confessions of a Justified Sinner. Oberon Books Ltd.: London. ISBN 9781783199495
- Heddon, D. (2015) Correspondences. In: MacDonald, C. (ed.) Utopia: Three Plays for a Postdramatic Theatre. Series: Playtext. Intellect: Bristol. ISBN 9781783204625
- Heddon, D. (2015) Taking a seat at the table. In: Harvie, J. and Weaver, L. (eds.) The Only Way Home is Through the Show. Series: Intellect Live. LADA/Intellect: London. ISBN 9781783205349
- Heddon, D. (2012) The politics of live art. In: Heddon, D. and Klein, J. (eds.) Histories and Practice of Live Art. Palgrave Macmillan: Basingstoke, UK. ISBN 9780230229730
- Heddon, D. (2011) Walk this way. In: Tuukkanen, J., Whelan, G., Jaakkola, M. and Tervo, L. (eds.) ANTIVERSARY. ANTI Festival: Kuopio, Finland, pp. 123–133. ISBN 9789525870534
- Heddon, D. (2009) One square foot: thousands of roots. In: Mock, R. (ed.) Walking, Writing and Performance: Autobiographical Texts. Intellect Books: Bristol, UK, pp. 153–177. ISBN 9781841501550
- Heddon, D. (2009) To absent friends: ethics in the field of auto/biography. In: Haedicke, S.C., Heddon, D., Oz, A. and Westlake, E.J. (eds.) Political Performances: Theory and Practice. Series: Themes in theatre (4). Rodopi: Amsterdam, Netherlands, pp. 111–136. ISBN 9789042026063
- Heddon, D. (2009) Tree: a studio performance. In: Mock, R. (ed.) Walking, Writing and Performance: Autobiographical Texts. Intellect Books: Bristol, UK, pp. 143–152. ISBN 9781841501550
- Heddon, D. (2008) What's in a name? In: It's Not Hard: Reflections on Live Art. Tramway, pp. 32–37. ISBN 9781899551439
- Heddon, D. (2007) A visitor's guide to Glasgay. In: Godiwala, D. (ed.) Alternatives Within the Mainstream II: Queer Theatres in Post-War Britain. Cambridge Scholars Press: Cambridge, pp. 339–361. ISBN 9781847183064
- Heddon, D. (2006) Beyond the self: autobiography as dialogue. In: Wallace, C. (ed.) Monologues: Theatre, Performance, Subjectivity. Litteraria Pragensia: Prague, pp. 157–184. ISBN 8073081229
- Heddon, D. (2006) Performing the confessional. In: Mathé, S. and Teulié, G. (eds.) Cultures de la Confession: Formes de l'Aveu dans le Monde Anglophone. Series: Mondes anglophones. Publications de l'Université de Provence: Aix-en-Provence, France. ISBN 9782853996471
- Heddon, D. (2006) Personal performance: the resistant confessions of Bobby Baker. In: Gill, J. (ed.) Modern Confessional Writing: New Critical Essays. Series: Routledge Studies in Twentieth-Century Literature. Routledge: Oxon, pp. 137–153. ISBN 9780415339698
- Heddon, D. (2006) The politics of the personal: autobiography in performance. In: Aston, E. and Harris, G. (eds.) Feminist Futures? Theatre, Performance, Theory. Series: Performance interventions. Palgrave Macmillan: Basingstoke, UK. ISBN 9781403945327
- Heddon, D. (2004) Performing lesbians: constructing the self, constructing the community. In: Gale, M. (ed.) Autobiography and Identity: Women, Theatre and Performance. Manchester University Press: Manchester, pp. 217–238. ISBN 9780719063336

Edited books:

- Heddon, D. and Johnson, D., (Eds.) (2016) It's All Allowed: The Performances of Adrian Howells. Series: Intellect Live. Intellect. ISBN 9781783205899
- Heddon, D. and Klein, J., (Eds.) (2012) Histories and Practices of Live Art. Palgrave Macmillan: London. ISBN 9780230229730
- Heddon, D., Klein, J. and Milican, N., (Eds.) (2010) The National Review of Live Art 1979-2010: A Personal History (Essays, Anecdotes, Drawings and Images). New Moves International: Glasgow, UK.
- Haedicke, S.C., Heddon, D., Oz, A. and Westlake, E.J., (Eds.) (2009) Political Performances: Theory and Practice. Series: Themes in theatre. Rodopi: Amsterdam, Netherlands. ISBN 9789042026063

Audio:

- Heddon, D. (2014) Going for a Walk: A Verbatim Audio Walk. [Audio]
