= Georgiana McCrae =

Australian artist (1804–1890)

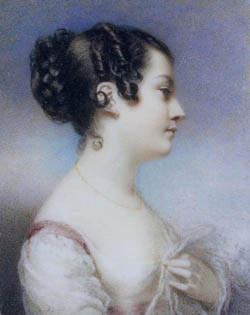
- Self portrait, in 1824
- Born: 15 March 1804; London, England
- Died: 24 May 1890 (aged 86); Melbourne, Australia
- Resting place: Boroondara General Cemetery
- Spouse: Andrew McCrae (m. 1830; died 1874)
- Children: George Gordon McCrae
- Parents: George Gordon, 5th Duke of Gordon (father); Jane Graham (mother)

Georgiana Huntly McCrae (15 March 1804 – 24 May 1890) was an English-Australian painter and diarist.

== Early life ==
Born in London, McCrae was the illegitimate daughter of George Gordon, the Marquess of Huntly, son and heir to Alexander, 4th Duke of Gordon. Her mother was Jane Graham, about whom little is known: ‘whether she was a housemaid or a milliner, a singer or an actress, she did not belong to Lord Huntly’s world’. Her father, although he publicly acknowledged her, played little part in her life but he financially supported her mother. Some of her early life was spent time in Scotland, with her first memories of playing with rocks in Newhaven, Edinburgh. By the end of 1806 she was back in London, where she was baptised on 6 October at St James's Church, Piccadilly.

By 1809, Georgiana and her mother had moved to Somers Town, a district of London where she began her education at a convent school. Somers Town was full of French refugees from the French Revolution some twenty years earlier. All lessons were in French and she was bilingual from an early age. She did not study there for long; because those who paid her school fees were worried about Catholic revolutionary influences, she was sent to Claybrook House in Fulham. After only a year there, she was then tutored at home.

Her first art teacher was Louis Mauleon, a civilian prisoner of war on parole who earned his living by making box cartons and jumping jacks for London toy stalls. For the next two years he arrived at her house each morning and helped develop her artistic skills, such as how to burn her own charcoal sticks.

== Developing her talent (1813–1821) ==
In 1813 Georgiana’s beloved aunt, Margaret Graham died. She had left her sister (Georgiana's mother) £400, which was set aside for Georgiana’s use, possibly to buy a home of her own one day. After an illness in the winter of 1813, she was sent to a new boarding school in Somers Town, but after only a year returned home for good. By 1814, Georgiana had moved to near Regents Park in London. An elderly French priest, Abbé Huteau, took charge of her general education until 1820.

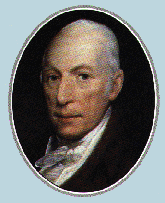
Alexander, 4th Duke of Gordon

She now ‘worked single-mindedly at her painting and drawing’. Her biographer Brenda Niall suggests this may have been in the expectation that Georgiana would have to make her own way in the world as a painter of portraits. However, as a woman artist, both her education and her career options were limited. The Royal Academy did not accept woman as students. She attended the studio of the landscape painter John Varley, but portraits were her metier. Moreover, without a father, brother or husband to promote her, she would struggle to find patrons even with her painting skills established.

The Royal Academy did allow women artists to show their work at its annual exhibition, and at the age of 12 Georgiana had a picture shown — a view of a church in 1816 – with other pictures exhibited in following years. In 1820, she won a silver medal from the Society of Arts for her portrait of her grandfather, Alexander Gordon, 4th Duke of Gordon. A year later she won the Society's silver palette with her Portrait of a French lady.

== Scotland (1822–1830) ==
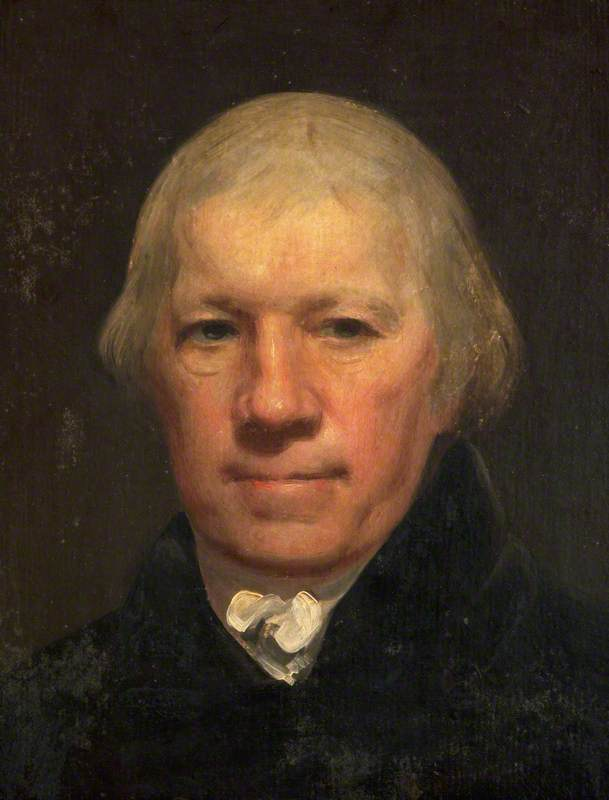
George, 5th Duke of Gordon.

Around this time (Georgiana did not give a definite year in her memoirs), Jane Graham fell out of a wagon and struck her head. She was incapacitated for the rest of her life, and moved to Margate, where she died in 1838. Georgiana went to live at Gordon Castle in Scotland, home to her grandfather, Alexander, 4th Duke of Gordon. She now lived surrounded by splendour, including galleries with paintings by Holbein, Titian, Van Dyke and Reaburn. The elderly Duke died in 1827, however, and at the age of 23 she went to live with her father (now the 5th Duke of Gordon) and his wife Elizabeth at Huntly Lodge. Her father needed to deal with crushing debt left to him by Alexander, as well as rebuilding the east wing of Gordon Castle after it burnt down that same year.

When it came time for Georgiana to find a suitable marriage partner — approved of by the Duchess Elizabeth — there were three possible candidates. Andrew McCrae was a solicitor and distantly related to the Gordons. There was a Major McDonald who belonged to a Catholic family (and who promised to convert, making him acceptable to the very Protestant Duchess). Finally, there was Peter Charles Gordon, known as Perico, the heir of the Laird of Wardhouse and also a Catholic. Georgiana’s journal from this time reveals her preference for Perico, but on the basis of his religion the Duchess forbade it.

In 1829, she took up residence in Edinburgh to resume her career as a portrait painter. ‘If she could not have love and marriage, perhaps she might have fame instead’. Her first patron was Charles Kilpatrick Sharpe. She focussed at this time on painting women and children, especially the then-fashionable art of miniatures. By 1830 she had made £225.

== Married life and children (1830–1840) ==
On 20 January 1830 Andrew McCrae proposed to her, and she accepted later that month. They were married in Scotland in September that year. In the first decade of their marriage, their address alternated between London and Edinburgh. Her first child Elizabeth was born in 1831, followed by George in 1833, William in 1835, and Alexander in 1836. All were born in Edinburgh, which suggests a conscious decision to affirm their children's Scottish identity.

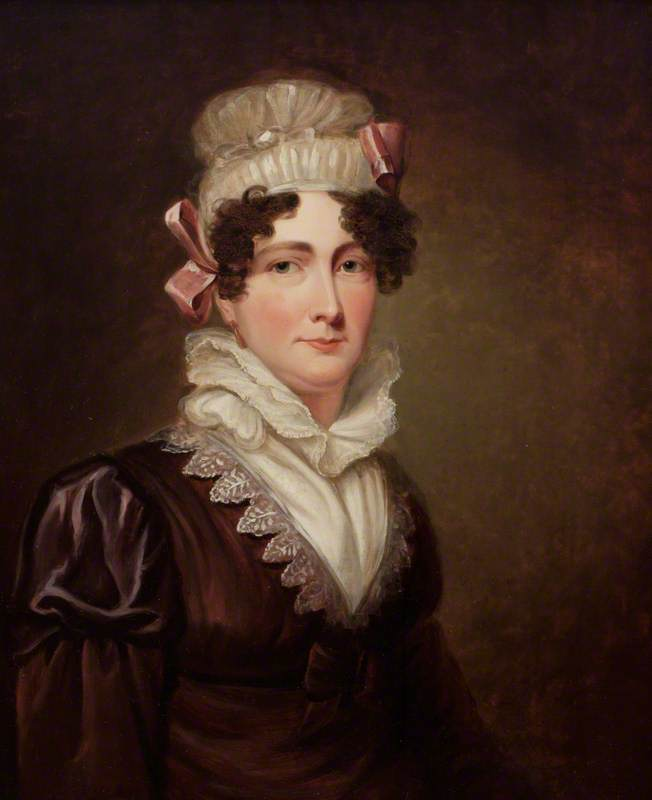
one of several portraits of Elizabeth, Duchess of Gordon

This decade also brought its share of tragedy. Her daughter Elizabeth died of fever in 1834, her father in 1836, her mother in 1838. Financially, too, they were in some trouble. Andrew McCrae’s legal career did not prosper, and they were disappointed on the issue of some expected legacies. Her father failed to sign his will, leaving her stepmother Elizabeth responsible for any financial gifts to his three illegitimate children.

The prospect of immigration now arose. At this point many of the McCrae family, including his brother Farquhar, had decided to move to Australia. In November 1838 Andrew and Georgiana were to sail for Sydney on the Royal Saxon, but the early arrival of her fourth son (named Farquhar) put paid to the idea of Georgiana leaving with him. A series of illnesses prevented McCrae’s family from joining him through 1839, all the while with Georgiana’s funds diminishing. She gave lessons and resumed painting portraits again while McCrae in Sydney struggled to establish himself. Eventually, after a failed land purchase in New Zealand, he moved to the newly established town of Melbourne and began practising law. Finally, in October 1840, Georgiana and her four children boarded the Argyle at Gravesend to rejoin her husband in his new life in Australia.

== Melbourne (1841–1845) ==
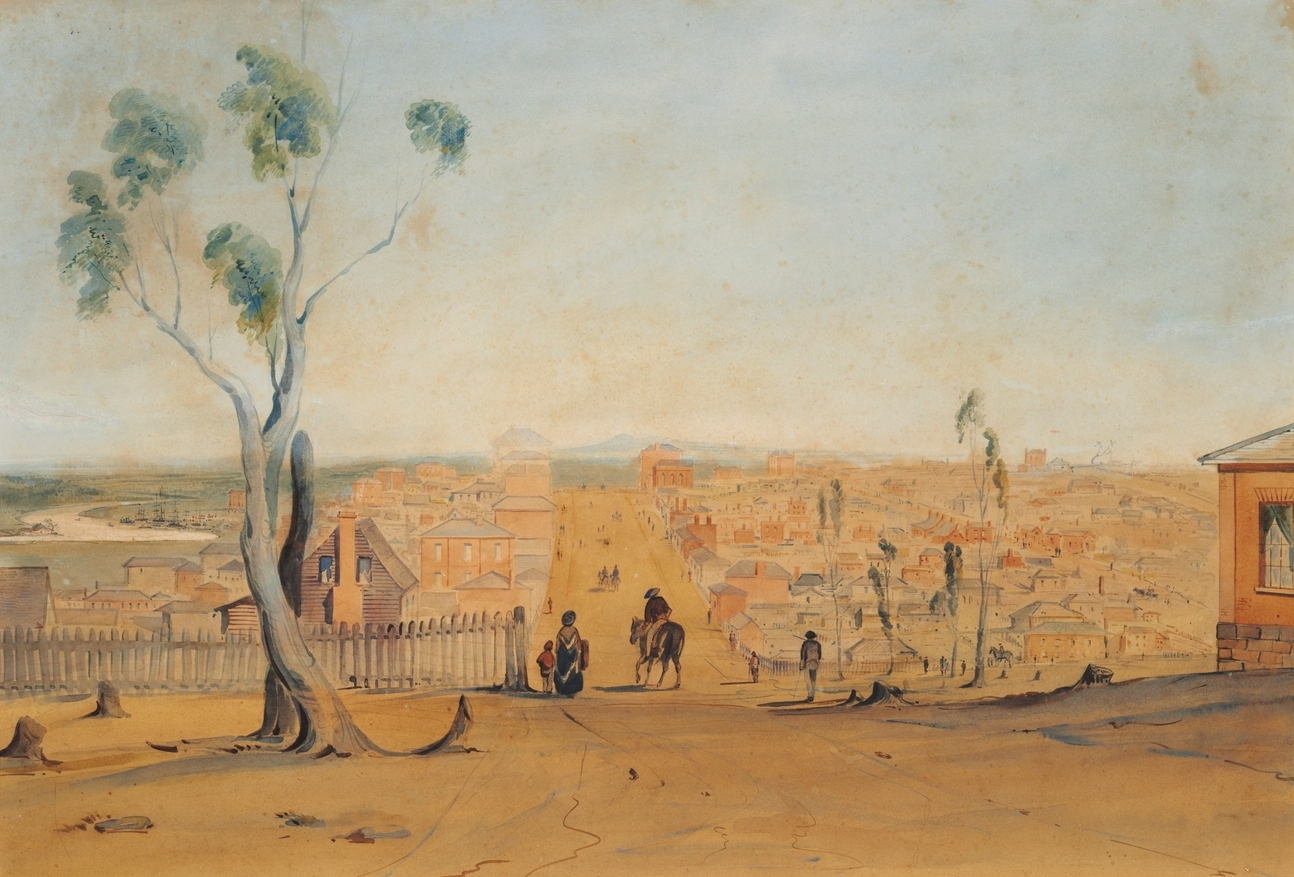
Collins Street, Melbourne, 1841

After a four month journey involving the usual excitements, including a severe storm and a birth at sea, the Argyle anchored in Hobson's Bay, near Melbourne on 1 March 1841. The newly reunited family moved into Argyle Cottage in Little Lonsdale Street, Melbourne, its steep rent of £100 per annum reflecting the lack of housing in the new town. A third McCrae brother, Alexander, arrived in Melbourne in 1841, joining Andrew and Farquhar to start his life afresh —- albeit with a lot of quarrelling between their respective families. As a sociable person, Georgiana quickly made friends, including with Sophie La Trobe, wife of the Government Superintendent Charles La Trobe. Georgiana was kept busy looking after her four sons, whom she took on lengthy walks, as well as entertaining guests at dinner parties and painting portraits for friendship.

Andrew McCrae borrowed money to buy land near the Yarra River, close to town, and borrowed some more to build a house there. The floor plan was designed by Georgiana. Called Mayfield, they moved there in February 1842. It provided a ‘bush idyll’ for the four boys. Also coming to live with the family was a Scottish immigrant named John McLure to tutor the boys. He was popular with the family and remained loyal to them through their tribulations for the next decade. A significant economic downturn was already being felt at this time, and by 1843 all the McCrae men were in financial difficulty. Unable to repay the loan, Mayfield was put on the market and the McCraes were made to pay rent on the property until it was sold. A request by Georgiana to the Duchess of Gordon for a monetary advance to buy the property came to nothing.>

Lacking the money to return to Britain, which was Georgiana’s preference, the next option to present itself to Andrew was a pastoral lease at Arthurs Seat. The birth of their seventh child (named Margaret) in June 1844 delayed their departure, as did the time needed to construct a homestead and to dissolve his legal partnership. In June 1845, she and Andrew finally left, sailing down the bay for nine hours on the small sailing vessel Jemina to their new home.

== Arthurs Seat (1845–1851) ==
The pasturage selected by Andrew was not ideal for cattle grazing, since it was at the base of a small forested mountain. Nor did he initially have enough cattle to make the lease a paying proposition. However, at this point much of the best pasturage in the Port Phillip district had been occupied. (Andrew also appeared to prefer scenic beauty over more practical considerations). As at Mayfield, the house was not complete when Georgiana moved in. Her three older boys had been living there since January with their tutor John McLure, sleeping in huts and assisting in the construction of the house.

The homestead (owned by the Victorian branch of the National Trust) had a floor plan designed by Georgiana and was built with local timbers, including messmate, stringybark and wattle.

The next six years at Arthur’s Seat were spent living simply, with the surrounding area providing them with enough fish, game, vegetables and wheat to be almost self sufficient. It was also an ideal location to raise children. Georgiana was to have two more children whilst living at Arthur’s Seat, Octavia (born 1847) and Agnes (born 1851), probably without a doctor present. Georgiana herself gained a reputation in the area as a ‘medicine woman’, with a reputation ‘for dealing quickly and expertly with small wounds, splinters, boils and sandy blight’.

The family continued to entertain visitors, ranging on the social scale from Charles and Sophie La Trobe to passing travellers. They also had cordial relations the local Bunurong tribe, who often camped near their homestead at certain times of the year. Georgiana and oldest son George learnt many native words, and she painted two of them, Benbenjie and Eliza. Her biographer notes how these portraits are sympathetic and avoid the usual stereotypes of native people at this time.

Unable to make the lease a paying proposition, the McCrae’s were forced to give up Arthurs Seat in 1851. This was a blow to Georgiana, who had invested a lot of time and effort into their home, which included a pleasure garden. ‘I must bid farewell to my Mountain Home – and forsake the garden I had formed & the trees that I planted’.

The cottage that Andrew and Georgiana originally built at the foot of Arthur's Seat was later renamed McCrae Homestead following its donation by Andrew McCrae to the National Trust of Victoria in 1970. It was initially repurchased in 1961 by Georgiana's great-grandson, George Gordon McCrae and then left to his son, Andrew.

== Melbourne (1851–1867) ==
Her departure from Arthurs Seat led to a rupture in her relationship with her husband. He became a Police Magistrate in Alberton, Gippsland, and later transferred to the same post in Kilmore. Georgiana and her four young daughters lived in a rented house in La Trobe Street, Melbourne. Except for a few weeks at the end of his life, she and Andrew were not to live together again.

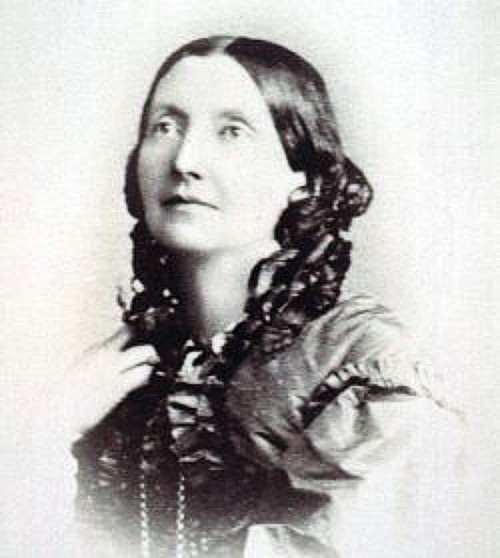
Louisa Anne Meredith

Melbourne had been transformed by the recent discovery of gold at various locations in Victoria (once a district of New South Wales, now a separate colony). Georgiana greatly enjoyed the intellectuals who brought to Melbourne ‘the sense of the living world of art and literature which books and newspapers from Britain could not adequately convey’. This included landscape painters who would subsequently become famous: Nicholas Chevalier and Eugene von Guerard. In 1856 she met a woman as talented as her, Louisa Anne Meredith, who was a painter, poet and writer. They stayed friends until Georgiana's death.

Despite the artistic and intellectual stimulus of gold-rush Melbourne, McCrae seemed to have done little of her own painting for the next two decades, except for a portrait of Meredith and two studies of another friend, Edith Howitt. In 1857 she exhibited with the Victorian Society of Fine Arts, gaining praise for her talent, but these may have been works completed decades earlier. Her biographer has suggested that the stresses of her life and marriage, with its pattern of displacement, may have left her inner self ‘too fragile for creativity’.

In January 1864, the Duchess Elizabeth died. She had spent the last decades of her life engaged in church politics and evangelical work. After many years of expecting a bequest, based on her father’s unsigned will, Georgiana was shocked to find she had been left nothing. Moreover, it limited her sons’ prospects to whatever they could do for themselves in the colony. Georgiana coped with her anger by writing down her memories of Gordon Castle, perhaps her way of reaffirming her identity as the daughter of the Duke of Gordon. She also copied out her journals from 1838 to 1845, possibly editing out some of her past as well as making additions to it. At this time, somewhat remarkably, she also sought advice on divorcing Andrew, but the law on judicial separation was too narrow to allow this. Instead, on his retirement as Police Magistrate in Kilmore in 1867, Andrew left for Britain and stayed away for seven years.

== Last years (1867–1890) ==
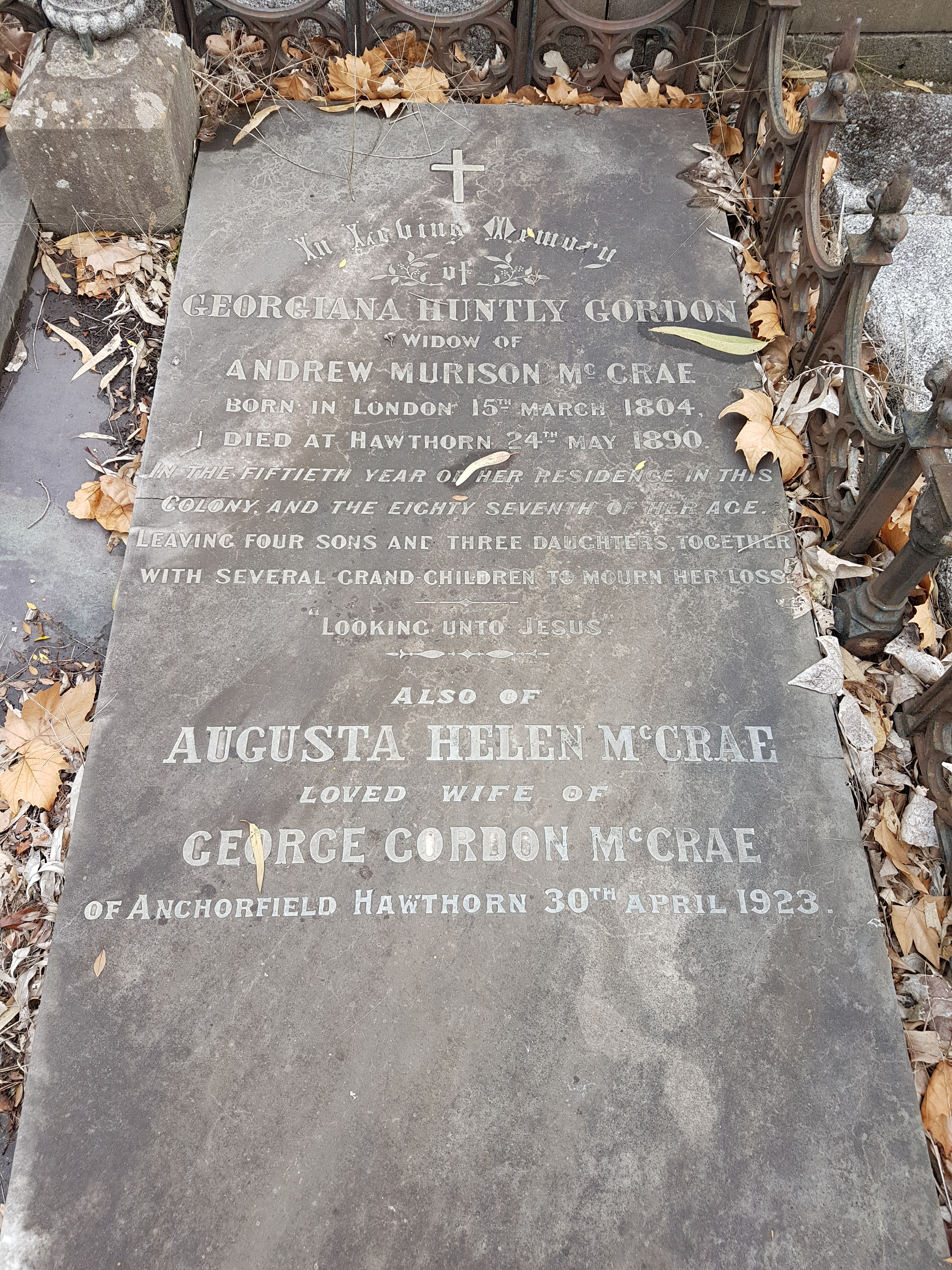
Gravestone of Georgiana McCrae

Georgiana lived with her still-unmarried son George in the east of Melbourne, initially in Collingwood, then Richmond. She wrote many letters, at which she was quite adept: it allowed ‘free play to her powers of observation, her gift for a pithy phrase, her malice’. Her husband returned to Melbourne in April 1874, but he was quite ill and died in July that year. He lived with George and Georgiana for these weeks, indicating that some sort of reconciliation took place. However, he left behind no money and no will. (Note: A photograph of Andrew Murison McCrae, later life, is held at the State Library of Victoria.)

In her last years, alternating homes with the families of her daughters in Kew and Hawthorn, Georgiana occasionally travelled to Cape Schanck, where she painted and spent time with Edith Howitt at the house she shared with her husband, Robert Anderson. She remained intellectually alert, but could be irascible, and also suffered physical ailments such as a troublesome hip and poor circulation. Sensing her life was coming to a close, she made out her will on 6 May 1890. She died on 24 May 1890, aged 86, in the presence of almost all her family. She was buried next to her husband at Boroondara General Cemetery.

Georgiana was 'prevented by the conditions of her life from reaching her full height as an artist': this included her illegitimate birth, marriage to a man who was not her first choice, and an exile to Australia, where she was repeatedly dislodged from beloved homes. However, her household was a beacon to artistic men and women, some ‘as isolated and unhappy as she was’, and she showed herself as a woman 'of great courage, personality and ability'.
