= 128 New King's Road =

Grade II listed house in Fulham, London, built in the early eighteenth century

Coordinates: 51.471562°N 0.206485°W

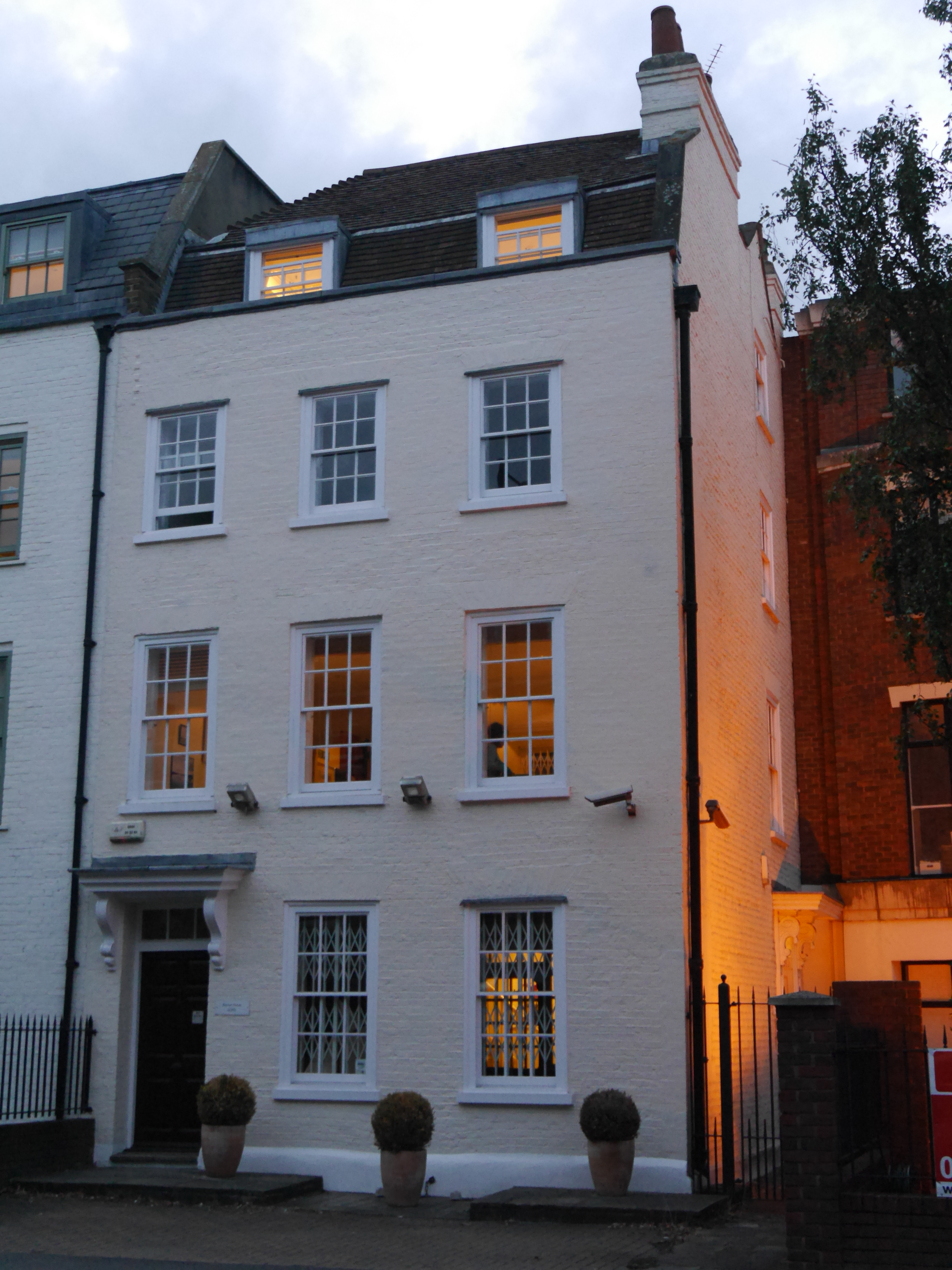
128 New King's Road, 2016

128 New King's Road is a Grade II listed house at 128 New King's Road, Fulham, London, England, built in the early 18th century.

It is a few doors away from Northumberland House and Claybrook House.
