= Louisa Bain =

- Born: Louisa Burn; 30 January 1803; London, England
- Died: 21 January 1883 (aged 79); Broxbourne, Hertfordshire, England
- Known for: Her daily diary
- Spouse: James Bain
- Children: 8

Louisa Bain born Louisa Burn (30 January 1803 – 21 January 1883) was a British diarist who recorded events every day from 1857 to 1883.

== Life ==
Bain was born in London in 1803 to Elizabeth (born Dyer) and Thomas Burn. She was the tenth of their twelve children and her father was a bookbinder. At the age of seven she went to be educated at Claybrook House, Fulham and left school aged twelve. In her twenties she married a book and print seller named James Bain on 15 September 1825. They had eight children starting with Elizabeth in 1828 and ending with Mary Elizabeth in 1842. They were all to survive.

In August 1857 she started the diary that would make her notable. She started her diary one day and then every day after that until shortly before she died she made an entry. She referred to the diary as containing facts and not feelings. She wrote about mundane matters but also executions, catastrophes and notable deaths. One of these was the death of Henry James and Bain describes how Sir Edmund Gosse went to see James who was on his deathbed to tell him that he had been given the Order of Merit. His nurse said she thought he was beyond communication, but nevertheless Gosse whispered the news into the dying writers ear. Bain says that after Gosse left, James opened his eyes and said that the nurse should remove the candle and "spare his blushes". Other versions of the death of Henry James exist.

Bain died in Broxbourne in 1883. Her diary is still kept within the family, and her grandson published excerpts from it in 1940 as A Bookseller Looks Back: The Story of the Bains.
