= Northumberland House, Fulham =

Building in Fulham, London, England

Coordinates: 51.471377°N 0.206737°W

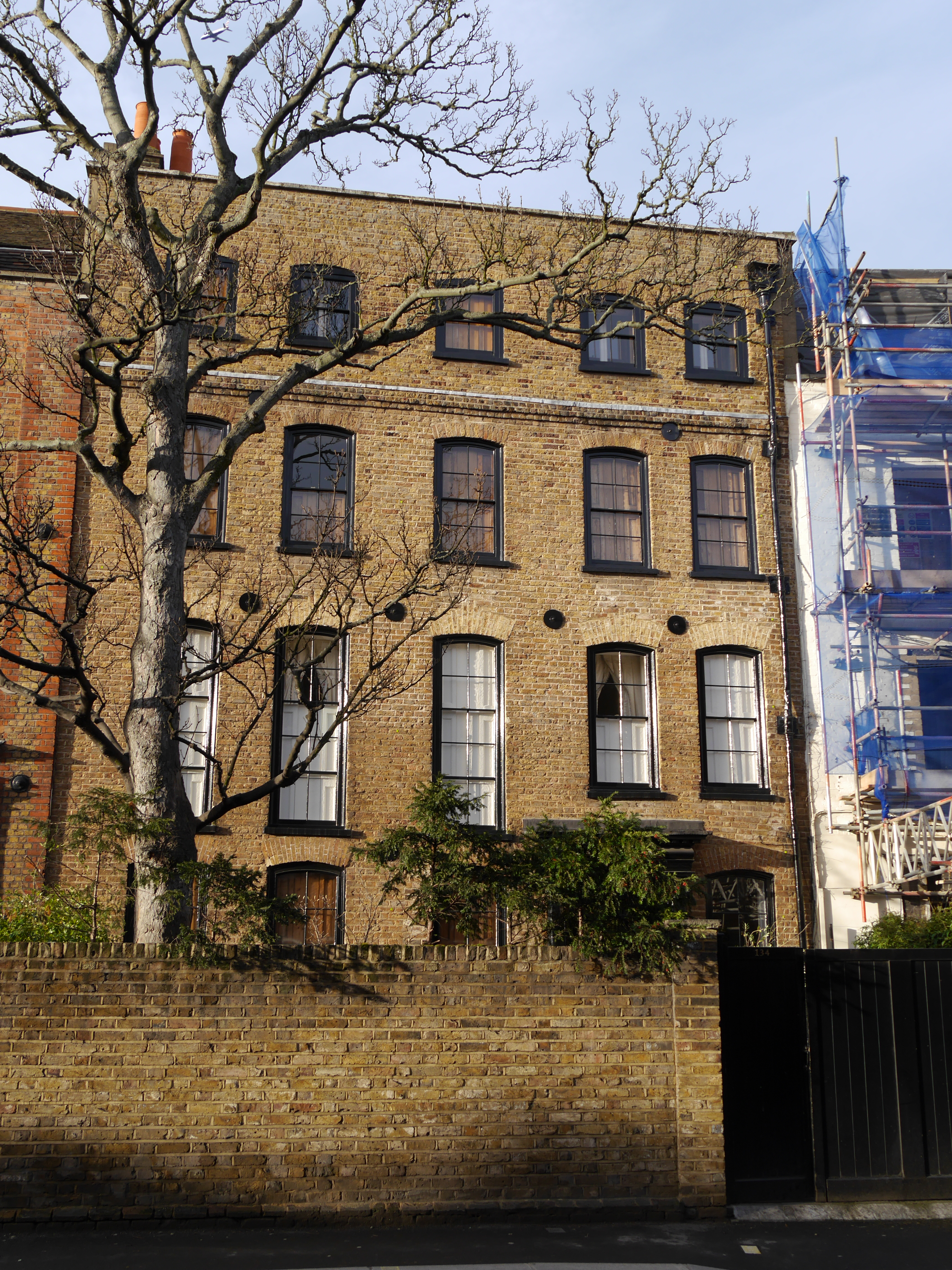
Northumberland House, Fulham

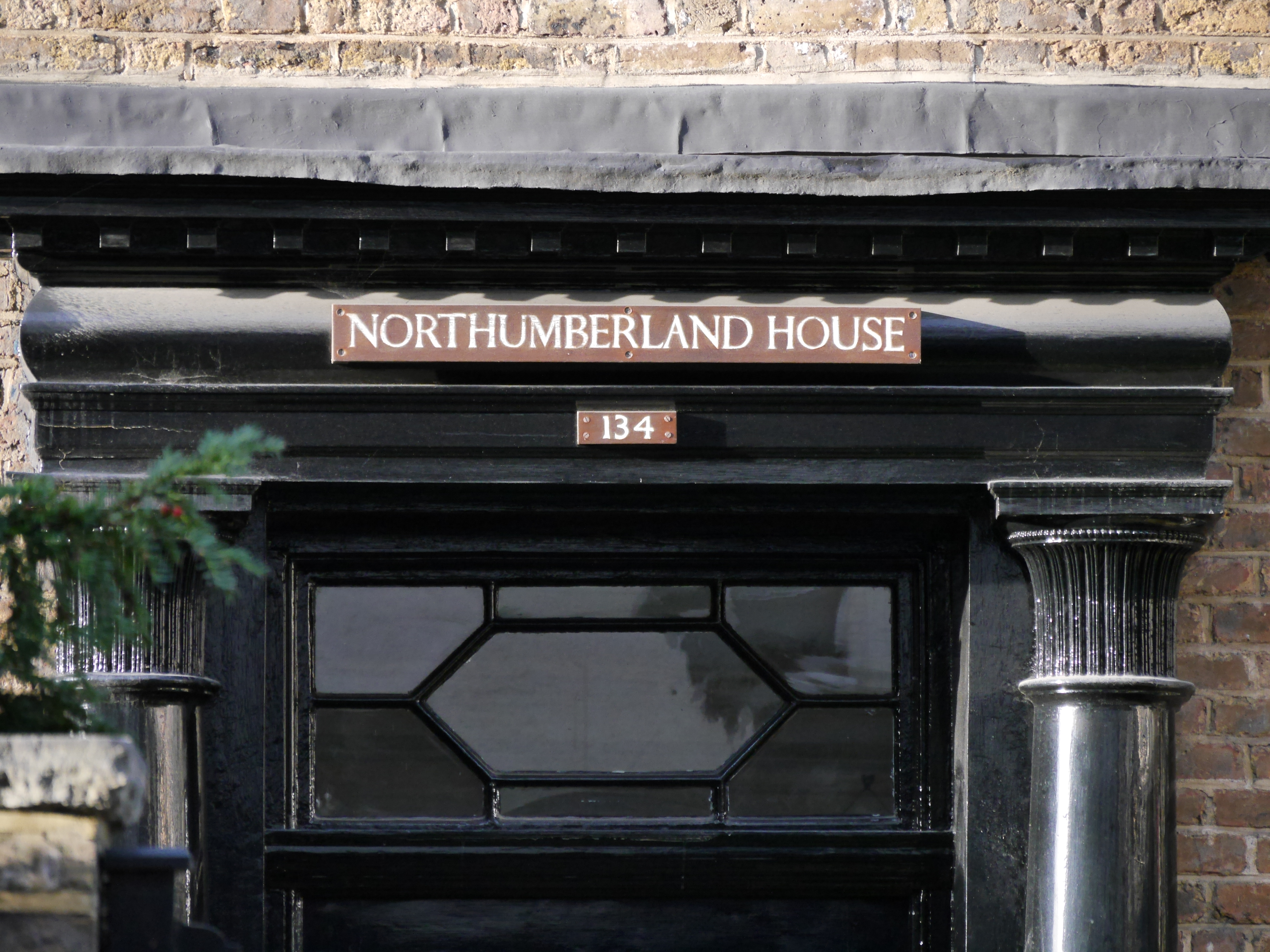
Door detail

Northumberland House is a Grade II listed house at 134 New King's Road, Fulham, London, built in the early 18th century.

It is next door to Claybrook House, and two doors away from 128 New King's Road.
