= Ethel Baxter =

Scottish cook and businesswoman

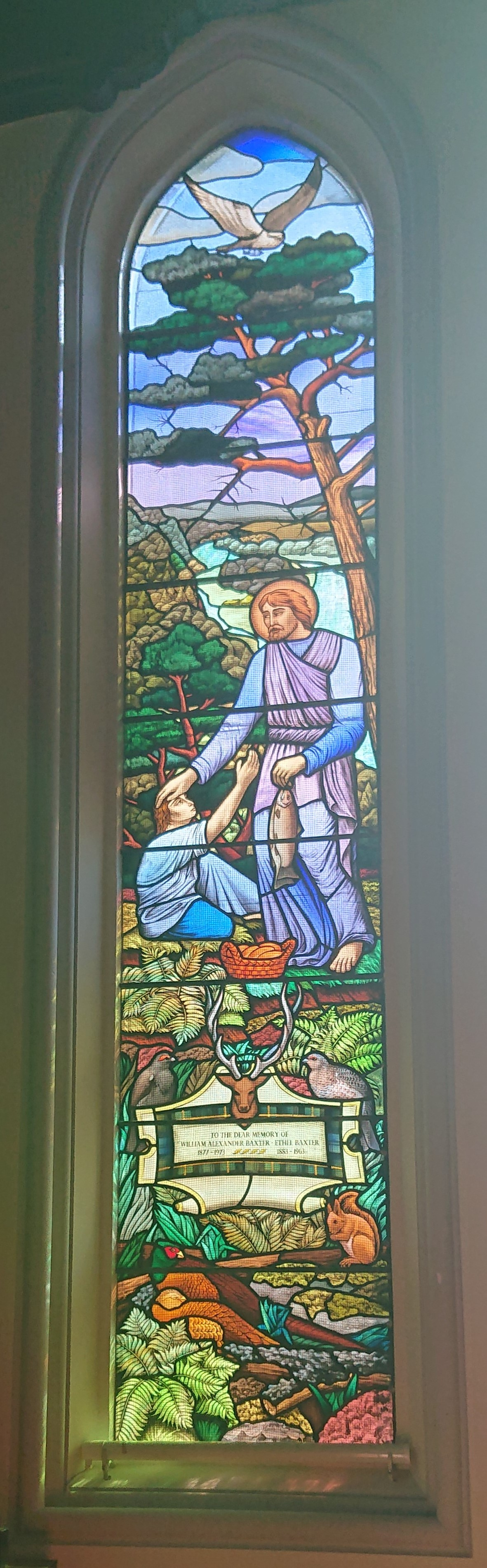
Memorial window in Gordon Chapel, Fochabers

Ethelreda Baxter (née Adam; 22 October 1883 – 16 August 1963) was a Scottish cook and businesswoman. She was a second generation member of the family that established the Baxters food processing company, based in Fochabers, Moray.

== Family life ==
Baxter was born in Roseisle, Moray, the daughter of a farmer, Andrew Adam, and his wife Elizabeth Farquar. She trained as a nurse and in 1914, tended a patient, William Alexander Baxter, whom she subsequently married. He was the son of George and Margaret Baxter, the founders of the original Baxters grocery shop in Fochabers.

== Career ==
Initially a nurse, Baxter joined her husband in business, and in 1916 they opened a factory near the River Spey to make preserves from locally sourced products. She then took charge of managing the factory, purchasing the fruit, hiring the workforce and devising new recipes. Baxter's guidance ensured that the product range widened to include soups and canned and bottled fruits. Her husband travelled widely, promoting the products, and the couple eventually began selling to customers in London, America and throughout the British Empire, including the royal household itself.

== Death ==
Baxter died in 1963 in Elgin, Moray. She was 79.
