= Elizabeth Gordon, Duchess of Gordon =

Scottish noblewoman (1794–1864)

Her Grace The Duchess of Gordon
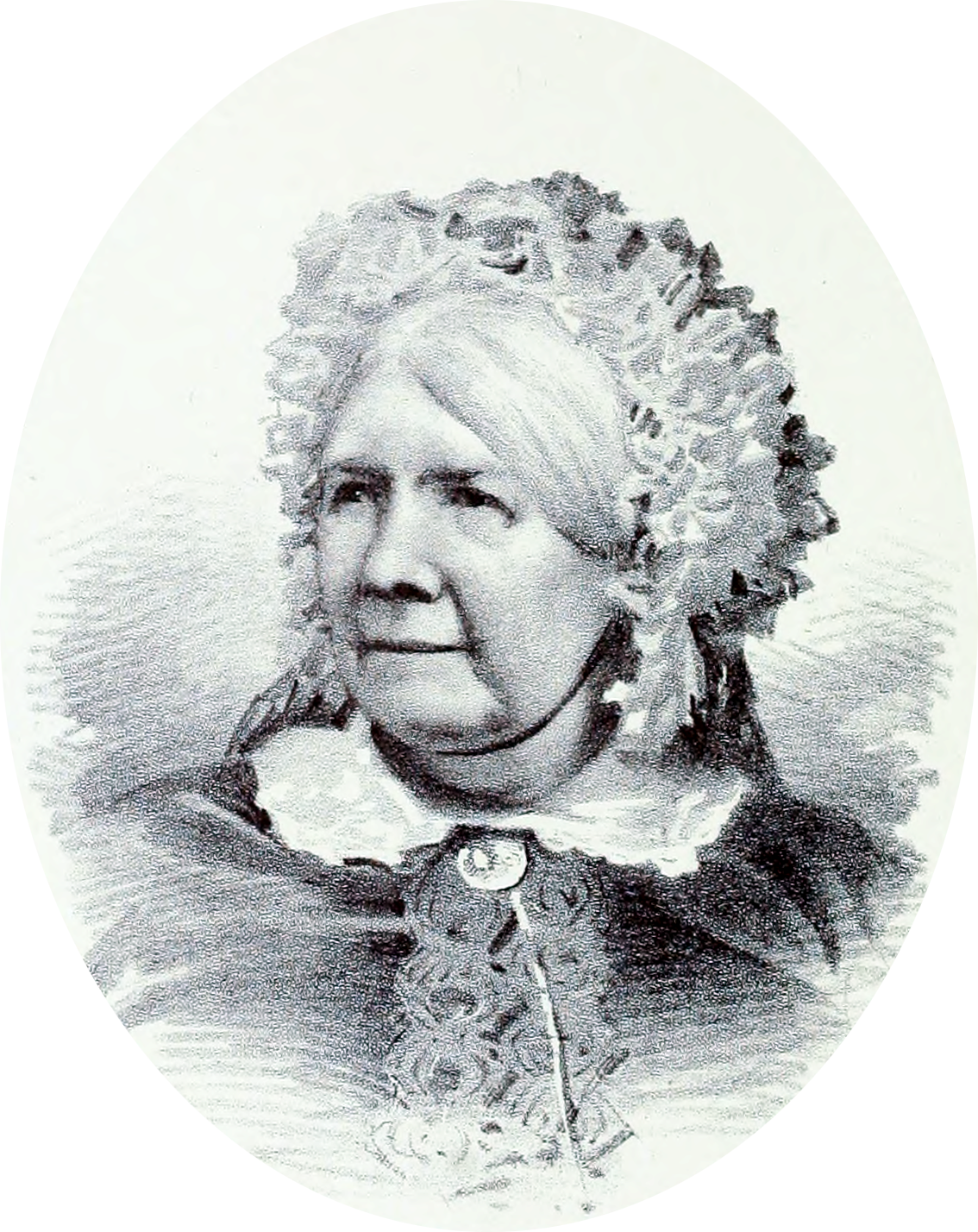
- Elizabeth Gordon from Disruption Worthies

Personal details
- Born: Elizabeth Brodie; 20 June 1794 London, England
- Died: 31 January 1864 (aged 69) Huntly Lodge, Aberdeenshire, Scotland
- Spouse: George Gordon

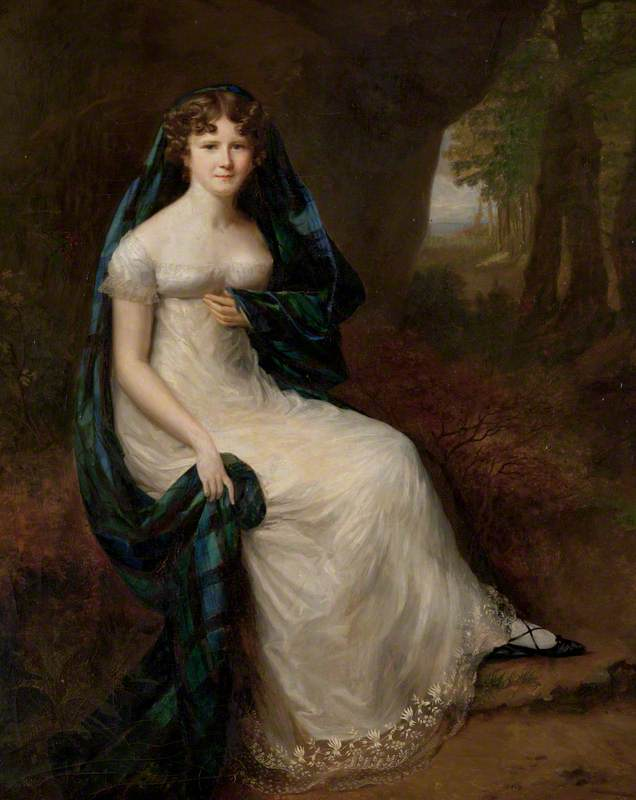
Portrait of Elizabeth Brodie, by Alfred Edward Chalon

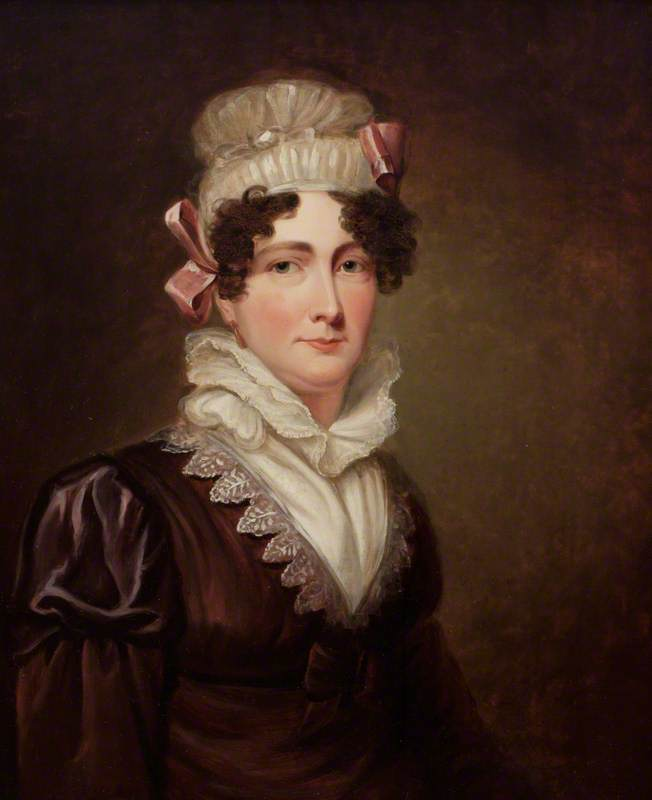
Elizabeth, Duchess of Gordon, with headgear.

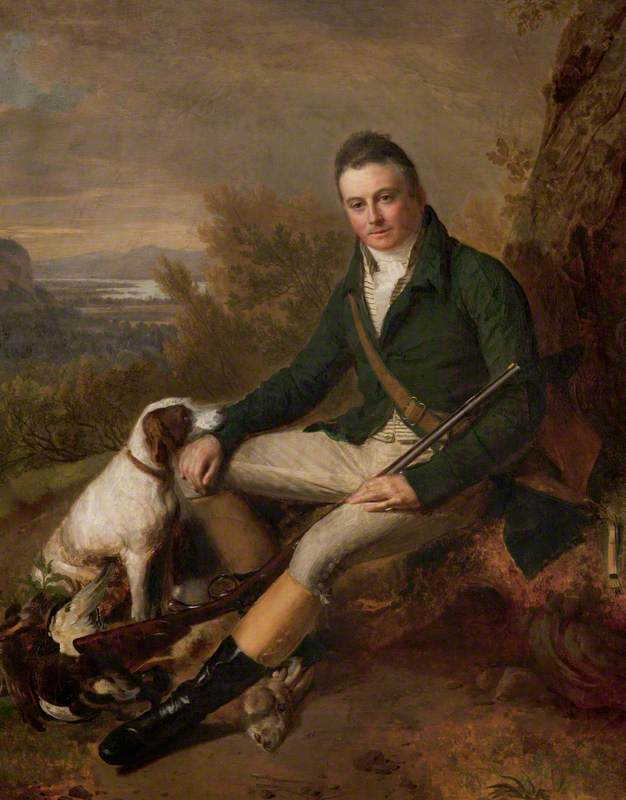
George, 5th Duke of Gordon

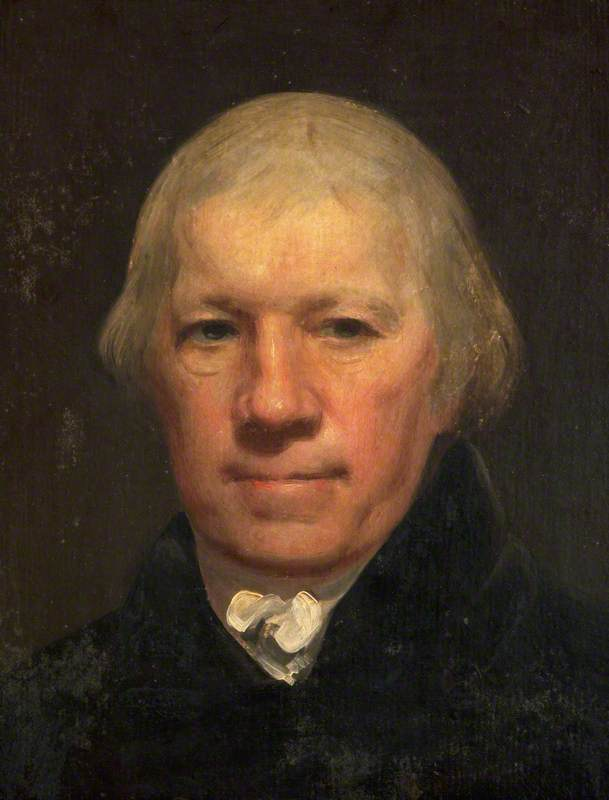
George, 5th Duke of Gordon

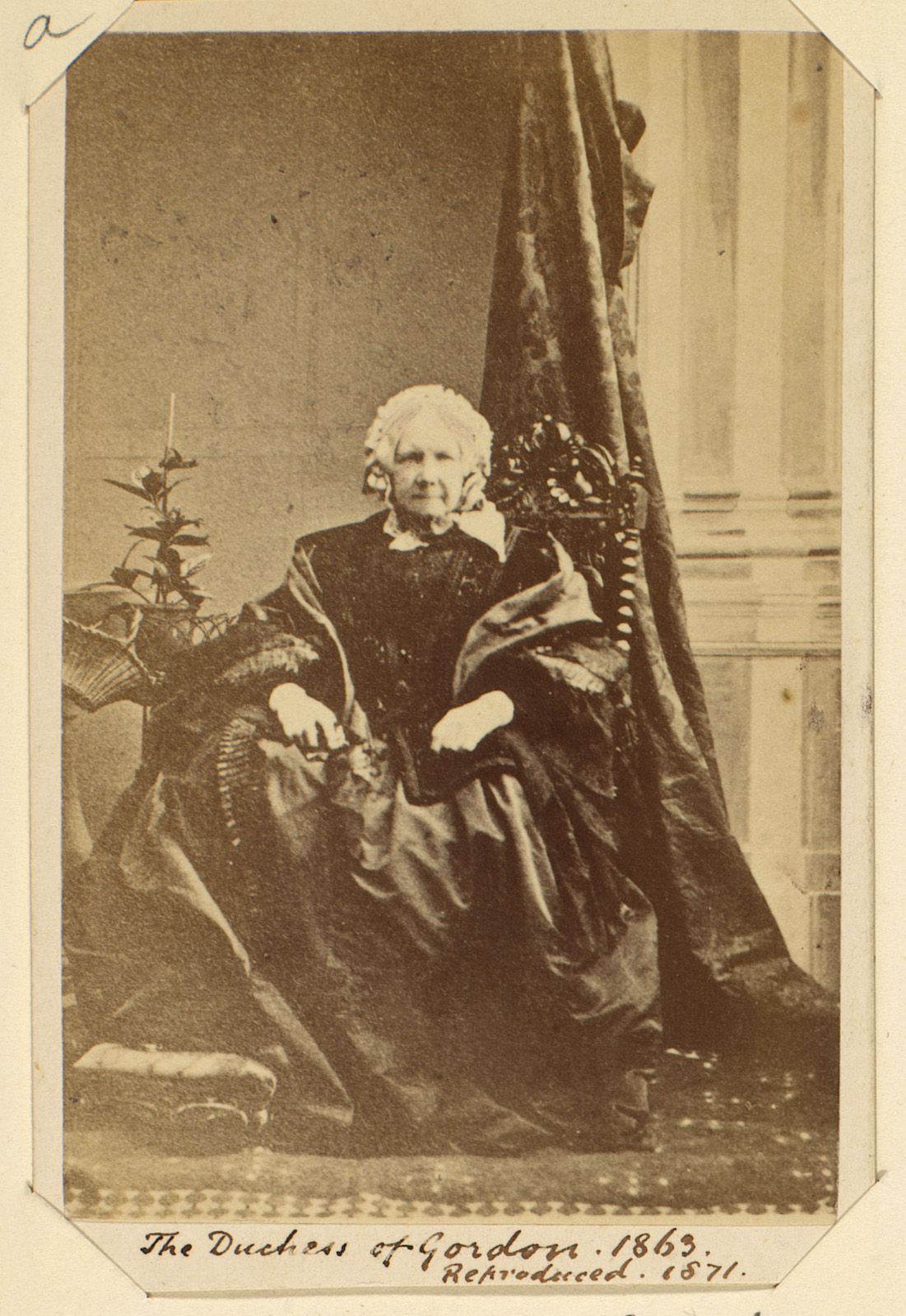
Elizabeth Gordon, by Jabez Hughes

Elizabeth Gordon, Duchess of Gordon (née Brodie; 20 June 1794 – 31 January 1864), was a Scottish noblewoman. In 1813, she married George Gordon, Marquis of Huntly, afterwards the 5th Duke of Gordon. She was a member of the Scottish Episcopal Church but left it and joined the Free Church of Scotland in 1846. She had the nickname The Good Duchess. She is remembered as a supporter of the early Free Church and as a founder of The Gordon Schools in Huntly and of the Gordon Chapel in Fochabers.

== Ancestry and education ==
Gordon was born in London on 20 June 1794. Her father, Alexander Brodie, was of the Clan Brodie from the north of Scotland, being a younger son of James Brodie. Her father made his fortune in India. Returning home he became a member of parliament for Nairnshire 1785–90 and Elgin Burghs. Her mother was Elizabeth Margaret, daughter of James Wemyss. Her mother died when she was 6 years old. She was brought up by her maiden aunts in Elgin. Carefully educated, she was the heiress of great wealth and possessed a handsome figure and a bright, joyous disposition.

== Marriage ==
She married George Gordon, Marquess of Huntly, 25 years older than herself, on 11 December 1813. Her position gave her access to the best society, but revelations of unblushing vice in high quarters distressed her and led her to study the Bible for solace under her grief. She became a most earnest believer, and after a time made a complete renunciation of the world.

Becoming Duchess of Gordon in 1827, at the age of 33, she deliberately began a life of earnest devotion. She was made Mistress of the Robes in 1830. She became interested in schools, chapels, and other Christian undertakings among her own people, and when in 1836 the death of her husband, with whom she had lived in much affection, made her independent, her devotion became more intense than ever.

At the point of her husband's death Elizabeth moved into the Dowager House on the estate, known as Huntly Lodge.

== Activities once widowed ==
Huntly Lodge, her residence, (now the Castle Hotel) is situated in Strathbogie, one of the chief fields of the well-known conflict between the church and the civil courts previous to 1843, when the disruption of the Church of Scotland occurred.

The duchess was an Episcopalian, but her sympathies were with those who were in conflict with the civil courts, though she was not disposed to identify herself with their movement. In 1846 her views changed. Believing that the Church of England was not constituted in accordance with the mind of the Lord, because it had no discipline, she left it after a long mental conflict, and joined the Free Church of Scotland. The leaders of the Free church, such as William Howels, were her personal friends, and often visited her house and held religious meetings under her roof. She came to occupy among evangelical Christians in Scotland the position that in former years had been held by the Countess of Leven and Viscountess Glenorchy.

The building of a church at Holyrood in Edinburgh was undertaken by the St Luke's congregation largely supported by Elizabeth.

== Death and legacy ==
Her death took place somewhat suddenly at Huntly Lodge on 31 January 1864, in her seventieth year.

She is remembered as a supporter of the early Free Church and as a founder of the Gordon Schools in Huntly. There is a portrait plaque of her and another of the duke inside the arched pend at the Gordon Schools.

== Family ==
Elizabeth married on 11 December 1813 in Bath. Her father gave her a dowry of £100,000 about £5 million in today's equivalent. After her father's death his she inherited his entire estate. Lord and Lady Huntly had two nieces, Caroline and Emily, daughters of William Montagu, living with them as daughters. In 1826 one of these, Lady Emily Montagu, was out of health, and they took her abroad for the winter. They do not seem to have been particularly anxious about her, and were able to enjoy their surroundings, and the society with which they mingled. However Lady Emily Montagu died after a sudden inflammatory attack on 31 January 1827. Elizabeth's husband had 3 illegitimate children: Charles Gordon, Susan Sordet, and Georgiana McCrae.

== Portraits ==
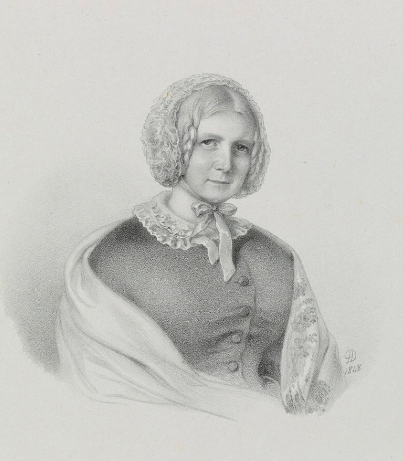
Elizabeth Gordon by Richard James Lane

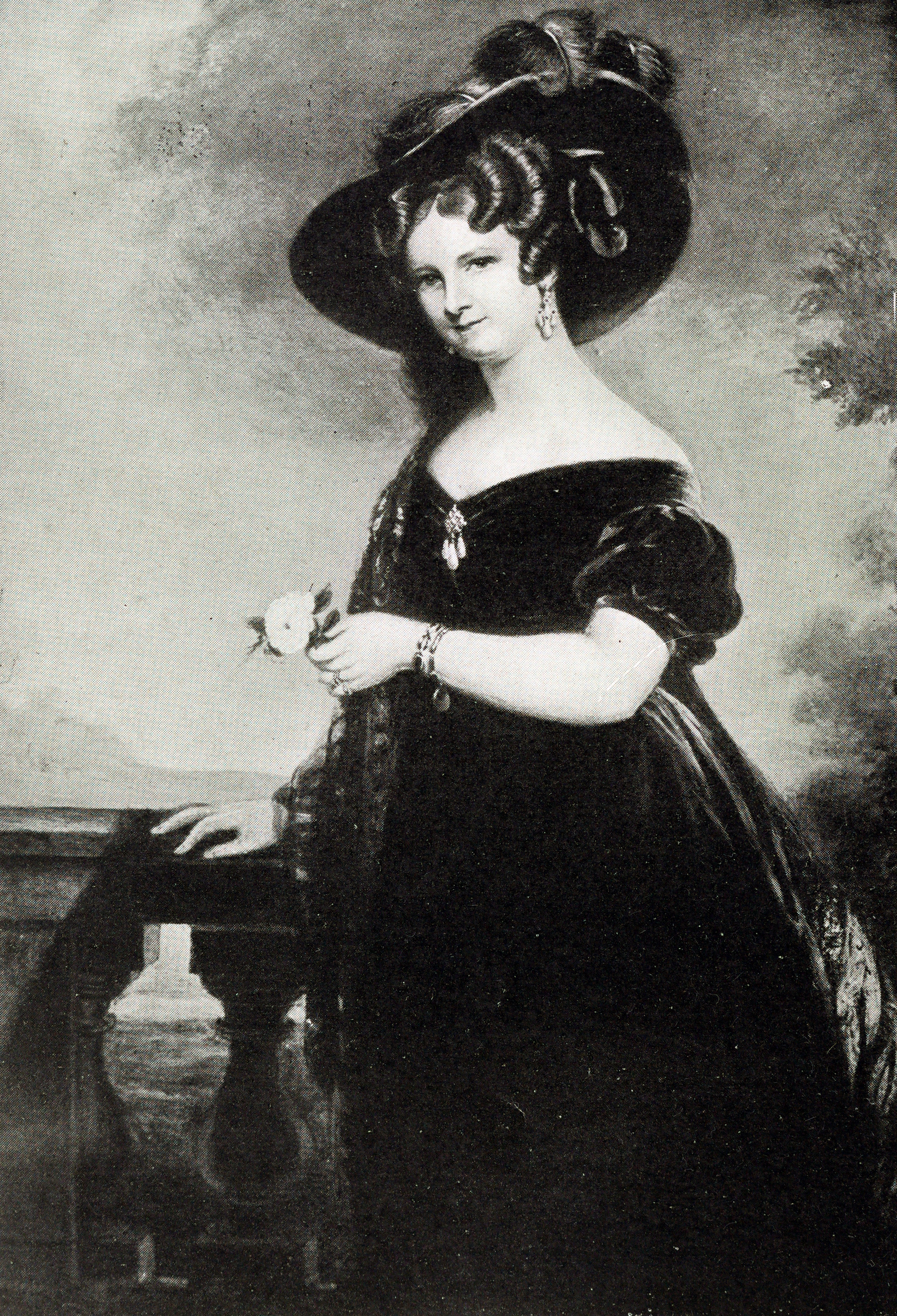
Elizabeth Gordon by William Essex

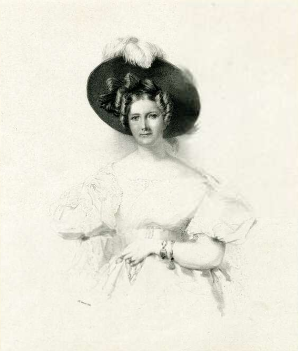
Elizabeth Gordon (née Brodie), Duchess of Gordon by Maxim Gauci from British Museum

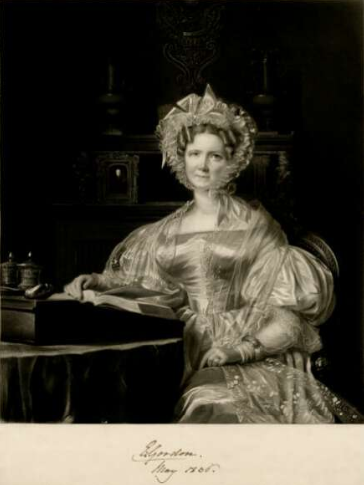
Elizabeth Gordon (née Brodie), Duchess of Gordon by Abraham Bouvier from British Museum

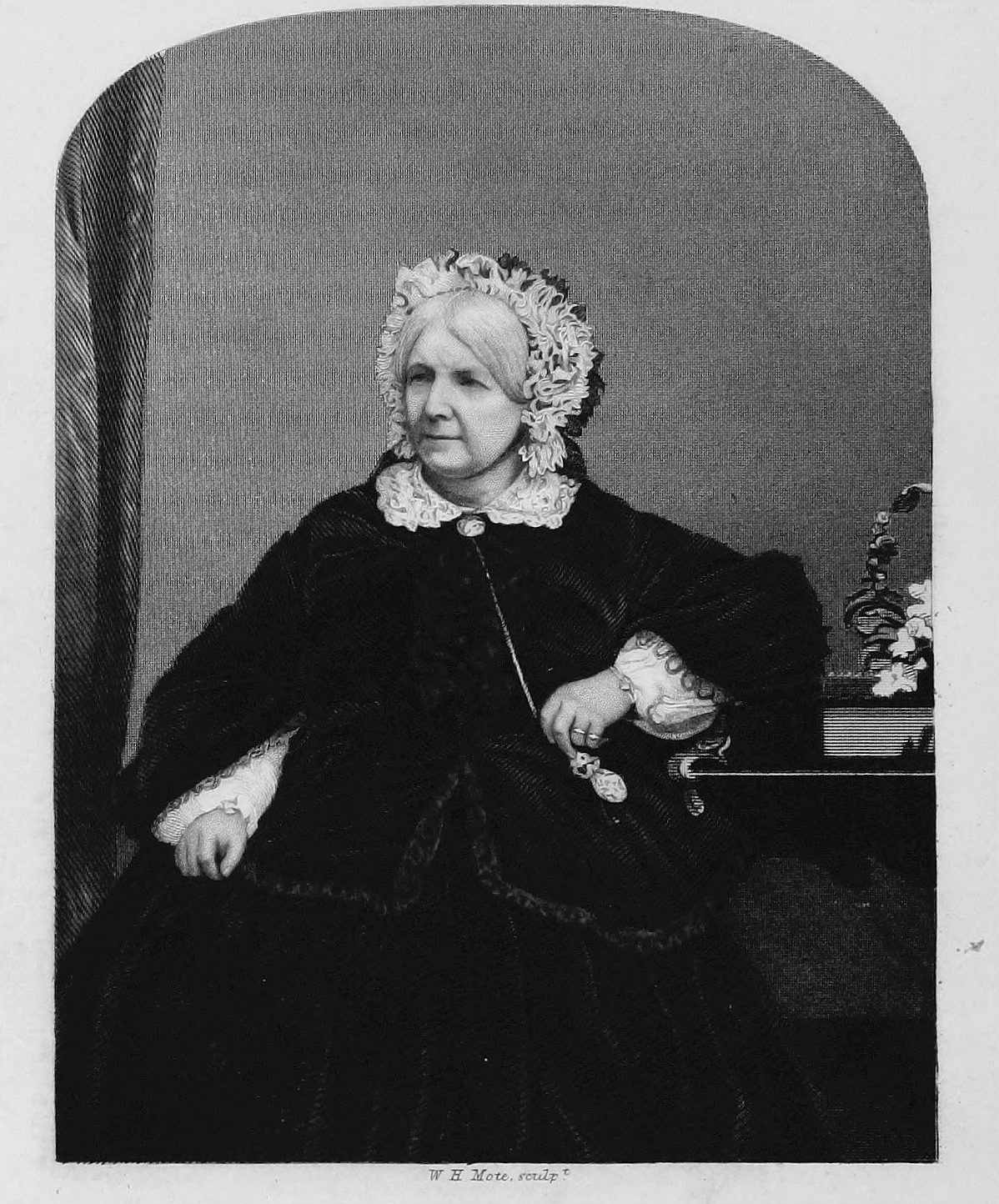
Elizabeth Gordon by H W Mote

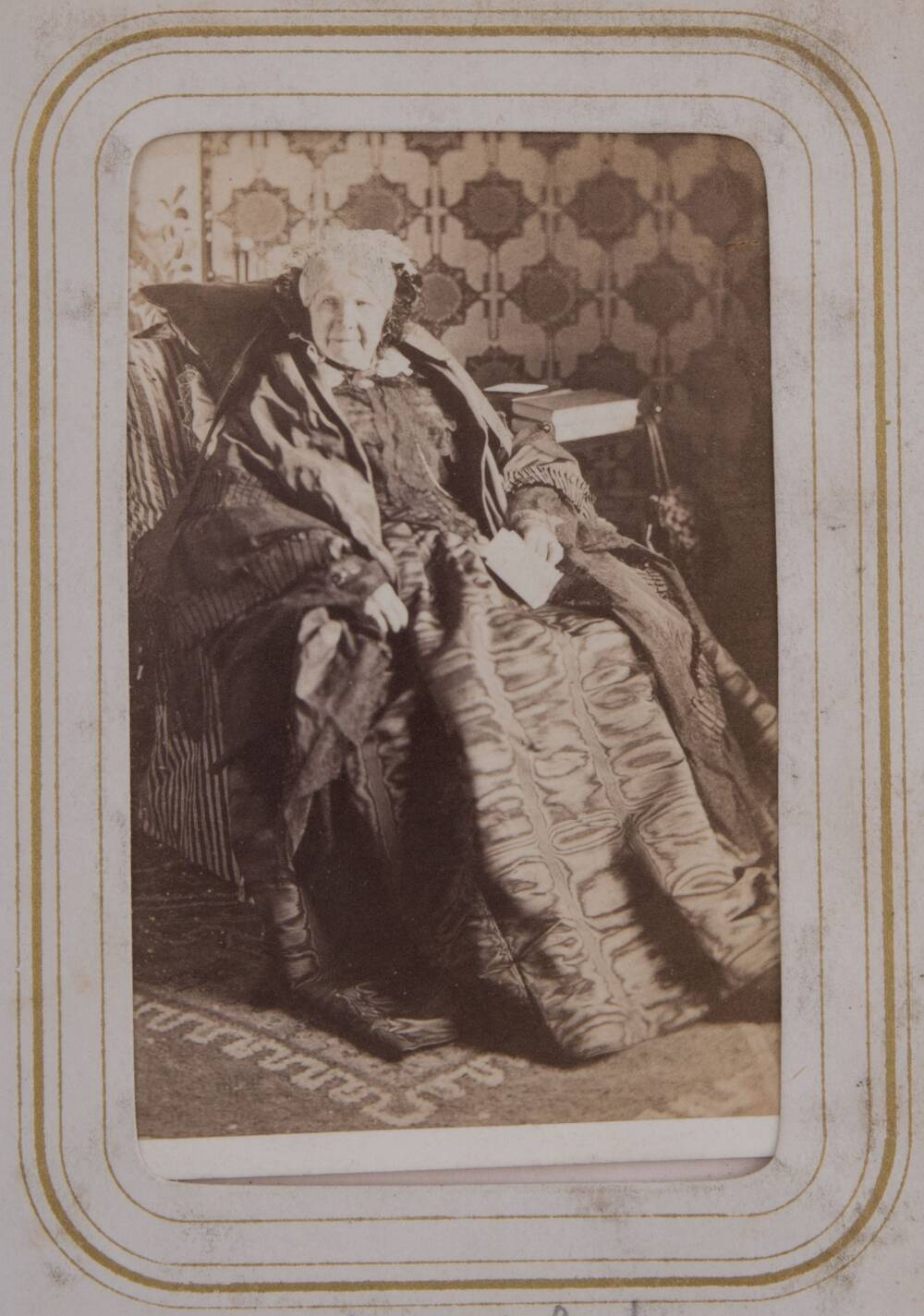
Carte de visite from Brodie Castle
