= George Gordon, 5th Duke of Gordon =

British Army officer

General His Grace The Duke of Gordon GCB PC
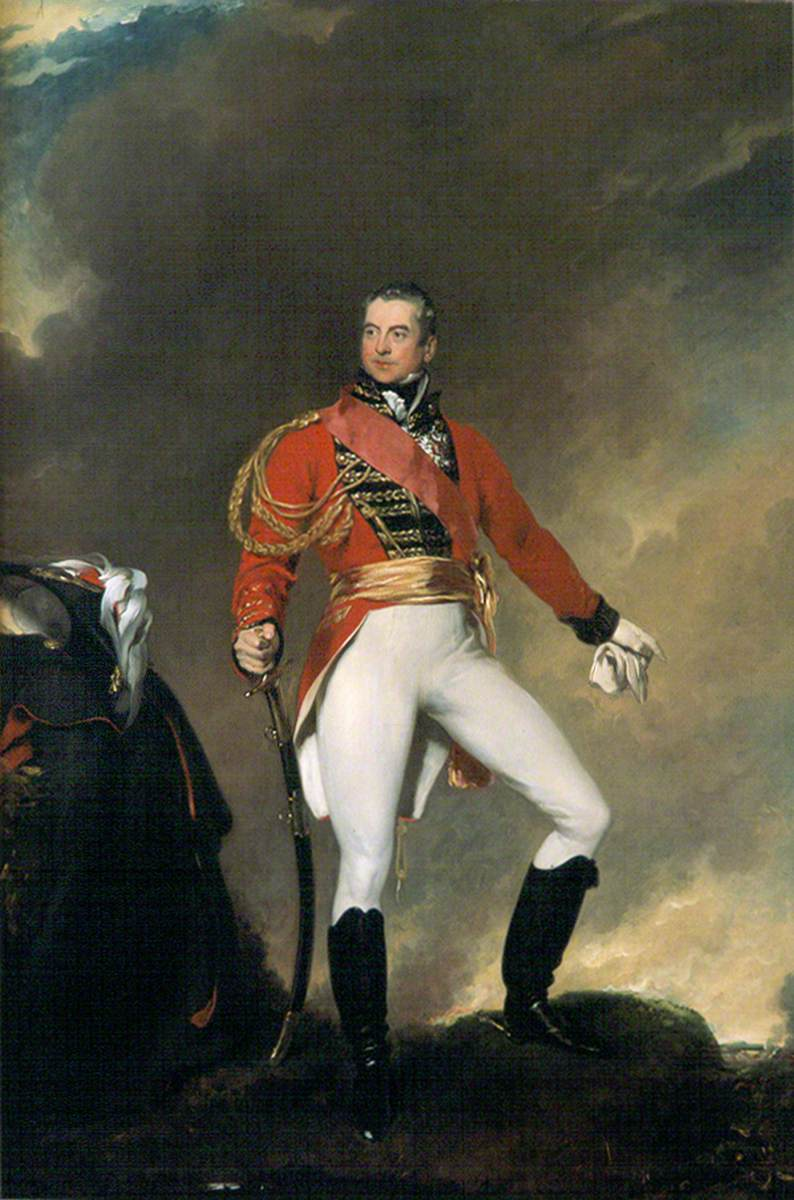
- Portrait by Sir Thomas Lawrence
- Predecessor: Alexander Gordon, 4th Duke of Gordon
- Successor: Line ended
- Known for: Nobleman, soldier, and politician
- Born: George Gordon; 2 February 1770; Edinburgh, Scotland
- Died: 28 May 1836 (aged 66); Belgrave Square, London
- Wars and battles: French Revolutionary Wars; Napoleonic Wars; War of the Fifth Coalition; Walcheren Campaign
- Offices: Grand Master of the Grand Lodge of Scotland (1792 to 1794); Member of Parliament for Eye (1806 to 1807); Keeper of the Great Seal of Scotland (1828 to 1830); Privy Counsellor (1830 to death)
- Spouse: Elizabeth Brodie
- Issue: Georgiana McCrae
- Parents: Alexander Gordon, 4th Duke of Gordon; Jane Maxwell

General George Duncan Gordon, 5th Duke of Gordon, GCB, PC (2 February 1770 – 28 May 1836), styled Marquess of Huntly until 1827, was a British Army officer and politician.

== Early life ==
George was born at Edinburgh on 2 February 1770, the eldest son of Alexander Gordon, 4th Duke of Gordon and his wife, the celebrated Jane Gordon, Duchess of Gordon, née Lady Jane Maxwell. He was educated at Eton. He became a professional soldier and rose to the rank of general. As Marquess of Huntly, he served with the guards in Flanders from 1793 to 1794.

From May 1796 as Colonel of the regiment, he commanded the newly created regiment: the 92nd Highlanders (usually called the "Gordon Highlanders" in honour of his family). In 1798 he served with the regiment in Ireland as Brigadier General and went with them to Holland in 1799. On 2 October 1799 he was wounded at the battle at Egmont-op-Zee in Holland. In 1806 he left the 92nd and transferred to be Colonel of the 42nd Regiment of Foot ("Black Watch"). He commanded a division in the Walcheren Expedition of 1809. From 1820 he was commander of the 1st (Royal Foot).

He was a freemason and was Grand Master of the Grand Lodge of Scotland from 1792 to 1794. He was a member of Parliament for Eye from 1806 to 1807. On 11 April 1807, at the age of 37, he was summoned to the House of Lords in one of the minor peerages of his father (Baron Gordon of Huntley, co. Gloucester). He was appointed a Privy Counsellor in 1830, was Keeper of the Great Seal of Scotland from 1828 to 1830 (a post that his father had held until 1827), and from 1834 to 1836 was Governor of Edinburgh Castle.

He left the 1st in 1834 and transferred to the Scots Fusilier Guards. He died on 28 May 1836.

== Marriage ==
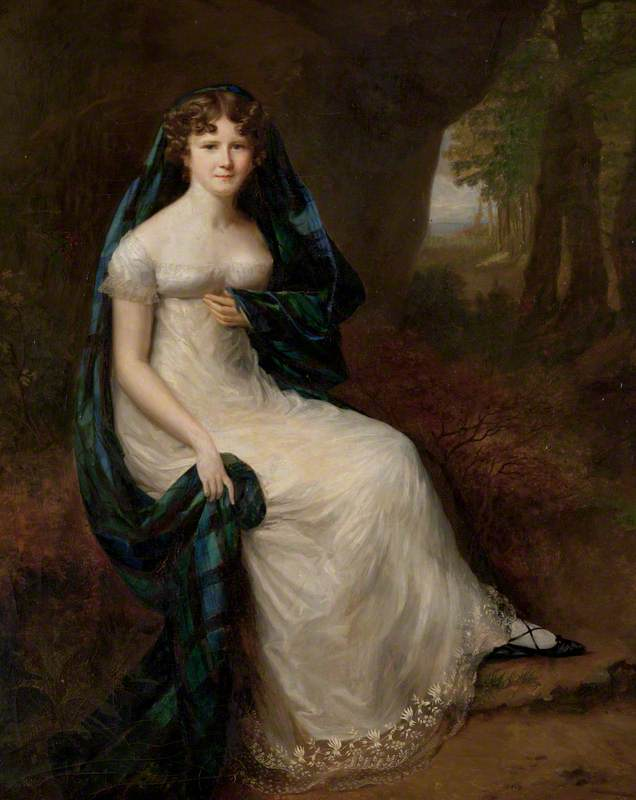
Elizabeth Brodie, Wife of the 5th Duke of Gordon

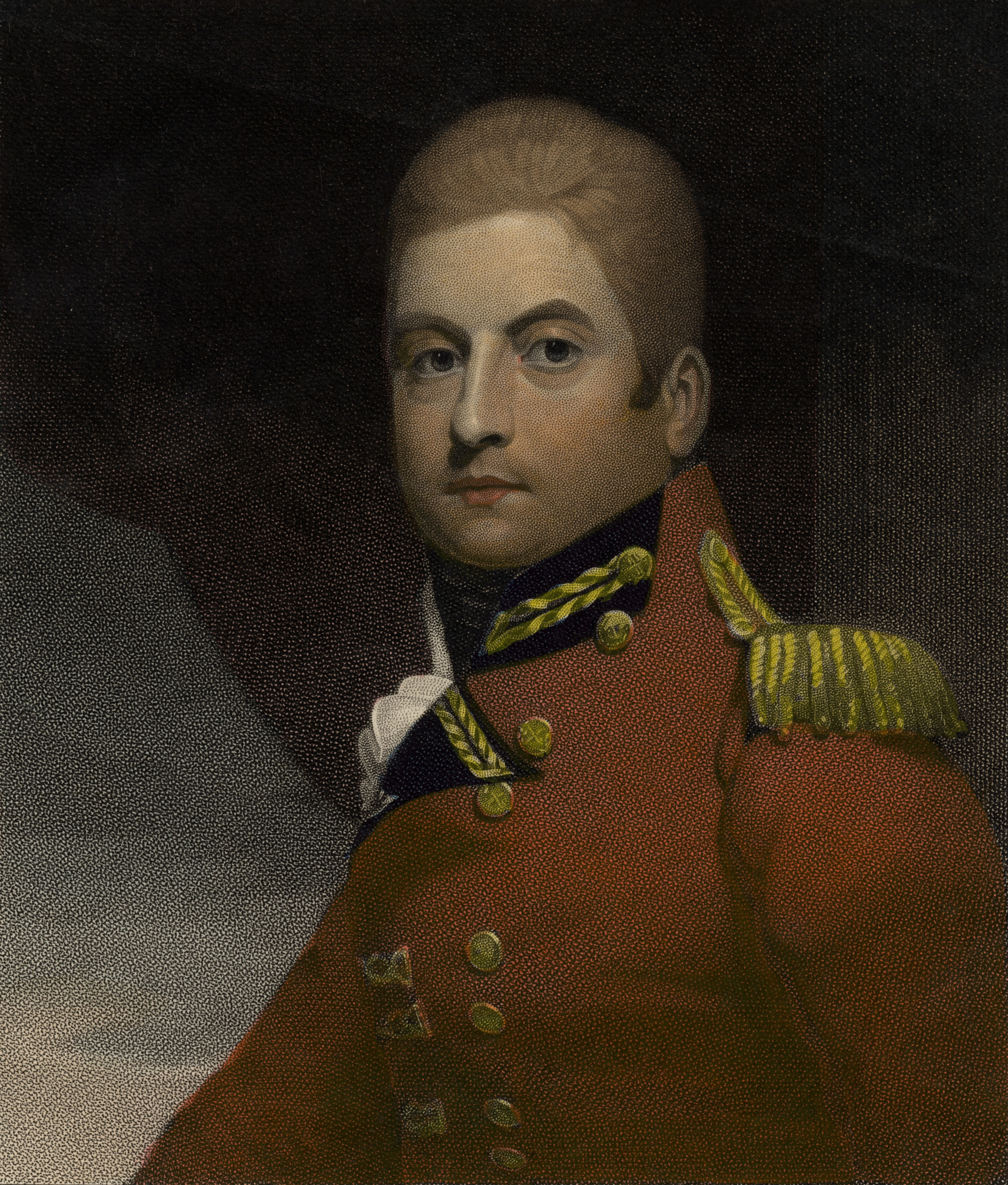
The Marquis of Huntly, Colonel of the 42nd Regiment, 1806

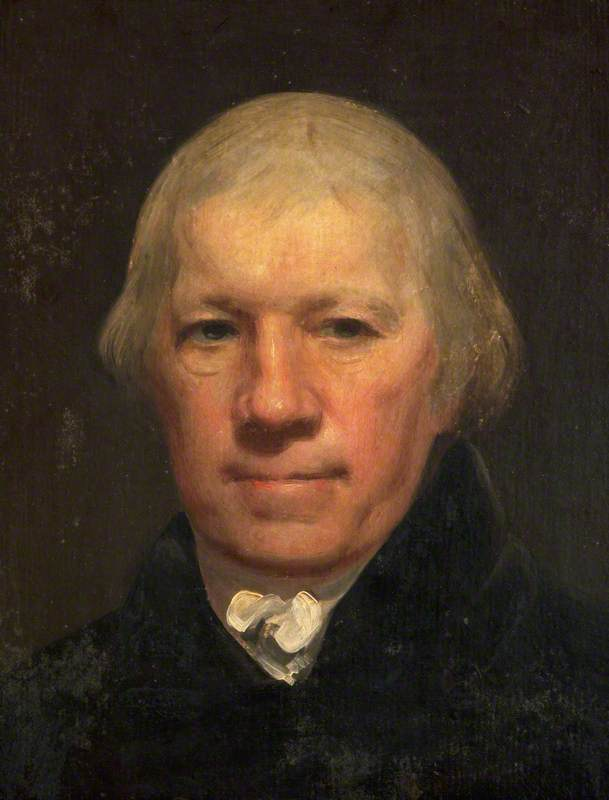
George, 5th Duke of Gordon.

He married at Bath, on 11 December 1813, Elizabeth Brodie, who was twenty-four years his junior. Brodie was the daughter of Alexander Brodie of Arnhall in Kincardineshire. Elizabeth Grant described her thus:

His bride was young and good, and rich, but neither clever nor handsome. She made him very happy and paid his most pressing debts, that is what her father did, old Mr. Brodie of the Burn, brother to Brodie of Brodie... He made a really large fortune; he gave with his daughter, his only child, £100,000 down, and left her more than another at his death. Really to her husband her large fortune was the least part of her value; she possessed upright principles, good sense, and she turned out a first-rate woman of business. In her later years, she got into the cant of the Methodists.

However, at the time of his marriage and, in fact, until he inherited the Dukedom, George found himself in almost constant financial difficulties. He was referred to as "Lord Huntly now in the decline of his rackety life, overwhelmed with debts, sated with pleasure, tired of fashion, the last heir male of the Gordon line". While his marriage remedied some of these problems, it did not supply the much sought-after heir.

Like his father, George acquired many of the positions which the Gordon family could expect almost as of right. These included the posts of Lord Lieutenant of Aberdeenshire, Chancellor of Marischal College, Aberdeen, and Lord High Constable of Scotland. He held the latter post of Lord High Constable for the coronation of King George IV in 1820.

By the time of his succession to the dukedom, he had established a reputation as an extreme reactionary. He steadfastly opposed the Great Reform Bill and when the majority of Tory Peers opted to abstain, he remained one of the twenty-two "Stalwarts" who voted against the Third Reading of the Bill in the House of Lords on 4 June 1832.

Throughout much of this period, his wife served Queen Adelaide at court. Indeed, she was given the Queen's coronation robe, which is now to be found with many other Gordon memorabilia at Brodie Castle.

Nathaniel Parker Willis, the American journalist, has left us with an interesting account of life at Gordon Castle in the twilight years of the 5th Duke's life. He described the "canonically fat porter" at the lodges who admitted him to a "rich private world peopled by ladies cantering sidesaddle on palfreys, ladies driving nowhere in particular in phaetons, gentlemen with guns, keepers with hounds and terrier at the heel, and everywhere a profusion of fallow deer, hares, and pheasants. At the castle a dozen lounging and powdered menials." Willis continued: "I never realised so forcibly the splendid results of wealth and primogeniture." Just before dinner, the Duke called at his room, "an affable white-haired gentleman of noble physiognomy, but singularly cordial address, wearing a broad red ribbon across his breast, and led him through files of servants to a dining room ablaze with gold plate."

== The Gordon estates ==
Insupportable debts led to what remained of the Lordship of Badenoch, which had been a domain of the Gordons for nearly 400 years, being advertised for sale in 1829. With no outside interest forthcoming, the Rev. John Anderson, manager and trustee of the Gordon estates, packaged the Badenoch lands into lots likely to be attractive to local interests. In 1830, the farms of Gordonhall, Ruthven, Knappach and Drumgellovie and the Forest of Gaick were bought by George Macpherson Grant of Ballindalloch. The farms of Uvie, Auchmore and Biallidmore and the Loch Ericht shootings were bought by Ewen Macpherson of Cluny. Wealth Major Ewen Macpherson had acquired in India allowed him to purchase Breakachy (his former home), Shanvall, Nessintully, Crunenmore, Crubenbeg and Presmuchrach. The Laggan farms on the upper Spey, the Kingussie lands from Ballachroan to Kerrowmeanach and the Alvie farms of Pitchurn, Pitourie and Delfour remained unsold until 1834, when they were bought by James Evan Baillie, whose fortune came from slave plantations in the Caribbean. In all, the sale of the Lordship realised £112,000 for the Duke, well short of the target of £145,000.

== Legacy ==
The Duke died at Belgrave Square, London, on 28 May 1836, aged 66. The Dukedom of Gordon (and the titles created at the same time as it) became extinct, as did the Earldom of Norwich and Barony of Gordon created for his father in 1784, but the Marquessate of Huntly (created in 1599) passed to his distant cousin the Earl of Aboyne while the remaining Gordon estates passed to his nephew, Charles Lennox, 5th Duke of Richmond (who adopted the surname "Gordon-Lennox", and whose son, Charles Gordon-Lennox, 6th Duke of Richmond, was created Duke of Gordon and Earl of Kinrara in 1876). The Gordon moveable property was left by the Duchess to the Brodies of Brodie.

In 1840, a monument to the Duke, funded by public subscription, was erected in the grounds of Kinrara House, his late mother's home near Alvie.

The Duchess of Gordon retired to Huntly Castle Lodge, where she became more fervently religious than she had previously been until her death on 31 January 1864, when the last trace of the original Dukedom of Gordon was also extinguished.

The Duke and Duchess of Gordon established the Gordon Chapel (Scottish Episcopal Church) in Fochabers that contains a memorial tablet to the 5th and last Duke.

The Duke had three illegitimate children: Charles Gordon, Susan Sordet, and Georgiana McCrae.

Parliament of the United Kingdom
| Preceded by William Cornwallis; James Cornwallis | Member of Parliament for Eye; 1806–1807; With: William Cornwallis 1806–1807; James Cornwallis 1807 | Succeeded by James Cornwallis; Henry Wellesley |
Military offices
| New regiment | Colonel of the 92nd (Highland) Regiment of Foot; 1796–1806 | Succeeded by Hon. John Hope |
| Preceded by Sir Hector Munro | Colonel of the 42nd (Royal Highland) Regiment of Foot; 1806–1820 | Succeeded by The Earl of Hopetoun |
| Preceded by The Duke of Kent and Strathearn | Colonel of the 1st, or The Royal Regiment of Foot; 1820–1834 | Succeeded by The Lord Lynedoch |
| Preceded by Sir Robert Abercromby | Governor of Edinburgh Castle; 1827–1836 | Succeeded by Hon. Patrick Stuart |
| Preceded by The Duke of Gloucester and Edinburgh | Colonel of the Scots Fusilier Guards; 1834–1836 | Succeeded by The Earl Ludlow |
Masonic offices
| Preceded by The Earl of Morton | Grand Master of the Grand Lodge of Scotland; 1792–1794 | Succeeded by The Marquess of Lothian |
Political offices
| Preceded by The Duke of Argyll | Keeper of the Great Seal of Scotland; 1828–1830 | Succeeded by Duke of Argyll |
Honorary titles
| Preceded by The Duke of Gordon | Lord-Lieutenant of Aberdeenshire; 1808–1836 | Succeeded by The Earl of Erroll |
Peerage of Scotland
| Preceded by Alexander Gordon | Duke of Gordon; 1827–1836 | Extinct |
| Preceded by Alexander Gordon | Marquess of Huntly; 1827–1836 | Succeeded by George Gordon |
Peerage of Great Britain
| Preceded by Alexander Gordon | Earl of Norwich; 1827–1836 | Extinct |
| Preceded by Alexander Gordon | Baron Gordon of Huntley (descended by acceleration); 1807–1836 | Extinct |
Peerage of England
| Preceded by Alexander Gordon | Baron Mordaunt; 1827–1836 | Abeyant |
