= Gordon Chapel =

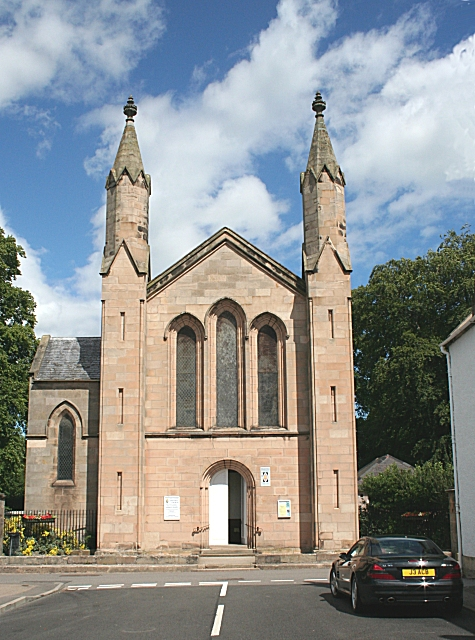
- The south facade, with main entrance
- Gordon Chapel
- 57°36′55″N 3°05′47″W
- Location: Fochabers
- Country: Scotland
- Denomination: Scottish Episcopal Church
- Website: islaspeydeveron-churches.org

History
- Founded: 19th century

Architecture
- Functional status: Active
- Heritage designation: Category A listed building

Gordon Chapel is a 19th-century church in Fochabers, Moray, Scotland. It is part of the Scottish Episcopal Church, under the governance of the Diocese of Moray, Ross and Caithness. Designated as a Category A listed building, it was built in the 1830s by Archibald Simpson under the patronage of the last Duchess of Gordon. Extensively renovated by Alexander Ross in the 1870s, it features the largest collection of Pre-Raphaelite stained glass windows in Scotland.

== History ==
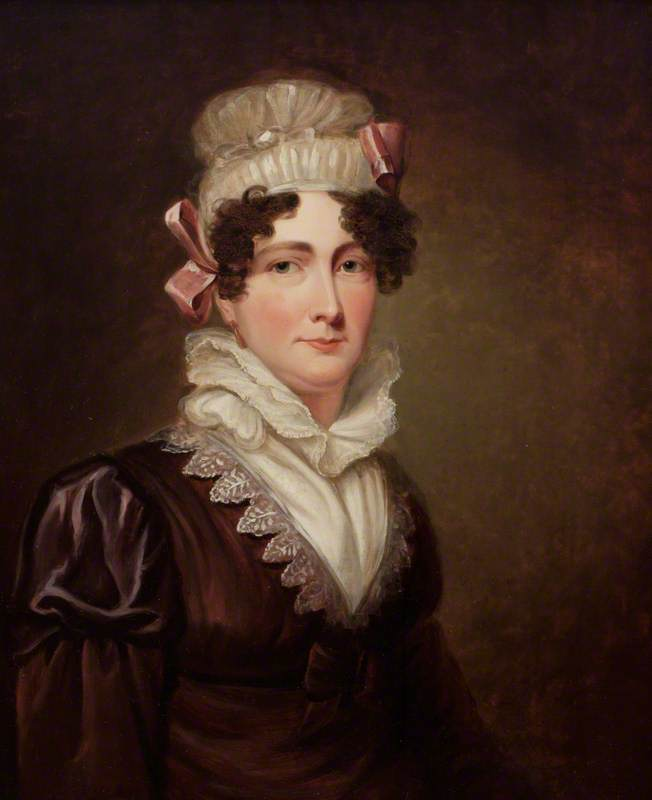
Elizabeth Gordon, Duchess of Gordon

The church was built at a cost of £900 from 1832 to 1834, according to a design by the noted Scottish architect Archibald Simpson, who was responsible for the construction of many of the notable buildings in nearby Aberdeen. The building was paid for by Elizabeth Brodie, wife of the fifth Duke of Gordon. Gordon Castle, which was the principal seat of the Dukes of Gordon, is near Fochabers, but only partly survives.

The first-floor chapel was dedicated on 12 August 1834, some three months after a school had opened on the ground floor of the building, in the space that was later to become the parsonage.

Elizabeth Brodie was an Episcopalian at the time the church was built, but since she was born in London and her household, servants and many of her visitors were from England, she favoured services that followed the English Book of Common Prayer over the Scottish Episcopal liturgy. Controversies around this, and over whether it should be subject to the 'government and inspection' of the Scottish church, eventually resulted in Brodie deciding to close the church in 1848. Local Episcopalians, now without a place to worship and concerned that the building should fall into disrepair, petitioned her in 1852 to allow them use of the building again. Brodie, who by this time had joined the Free Church of Scotland, agreed to make the church and school over to her Episcopalian nephew, Charles Gordon-Lennox, the Duke of Richmond, and the church was reopened.

Gordon-Lennox was succeeded by his son (also Charles) in 1860, who commissioned substantial improvements and renovations to the building by Alexander Ross, including the installation of a hammerbeam roof. The building remained in the hands of the Gordon-Lennox family until 1937, when it was sold by the ninth Duke to the Crown Estate. Worship in the building was suspended during the Second World War, and at one point troops were billeted within it; after the war, the Crown Estate considered selling it to house a cinema, but the congregation managed to raise the funds to purchase the building in 1950, and its use as a place of worship recommenced.

The building was again subject to renovation work from 2008, when all its windows were removed for safekeeping and restoration during the construction of a bypass road nearby. They were reinstalled and the building reopened in 2012.

== Description ==
The building is a two-level gothic design, with the parsonage (originally a school) on the ground floor and the chapel itself on the floor above that. It is oriented north–south, with the main entrance, leading onto Castle Street, on the south end which is faced with ashlar sandstone, while the rest of the building is harled. A projection in the north-west corner was originally a private entrance for the Gordon family.

The chapel boasts the largest collection of Pre-Raphaelite stained glass windows in Scotland, produced by Morris and Co, some designed by Sir Edward Burne-Jones. These include depictions of the Crucifixion (1874), St Cecilia (1879), St Ursula (1887), the archangel Raphael (1902), Christ as the Good Shepherd (1903) and the archangel Michael (1914). The St Michael window is dedicated to Bernard Charles Gordon-Lennox, third son of the seventh Duke of Richmond, who was killed in fighting near Ypres in November 1914, aged 36, during the First World War.

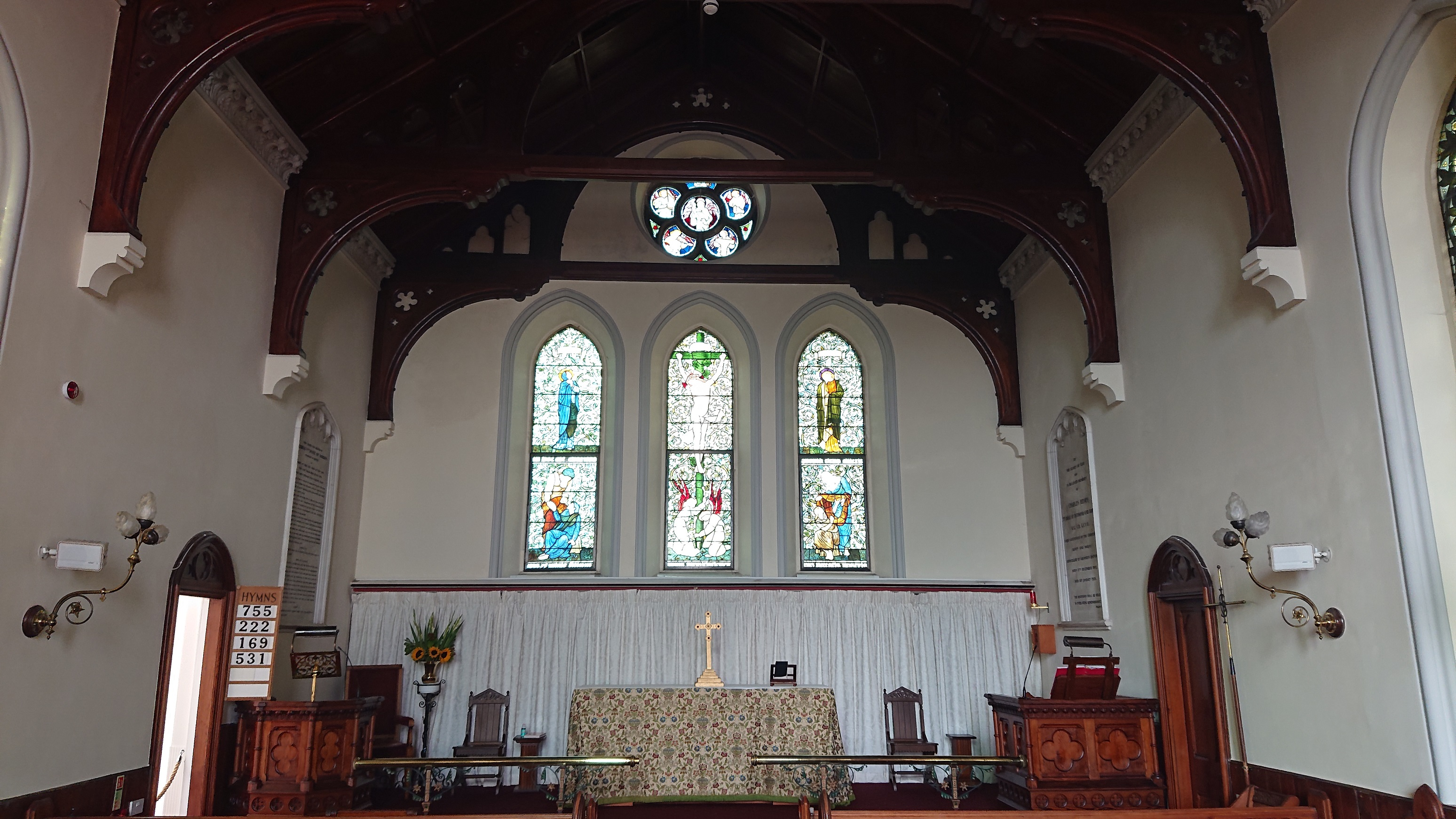
The triple lancet, depicting the Crucifixion of Jesus

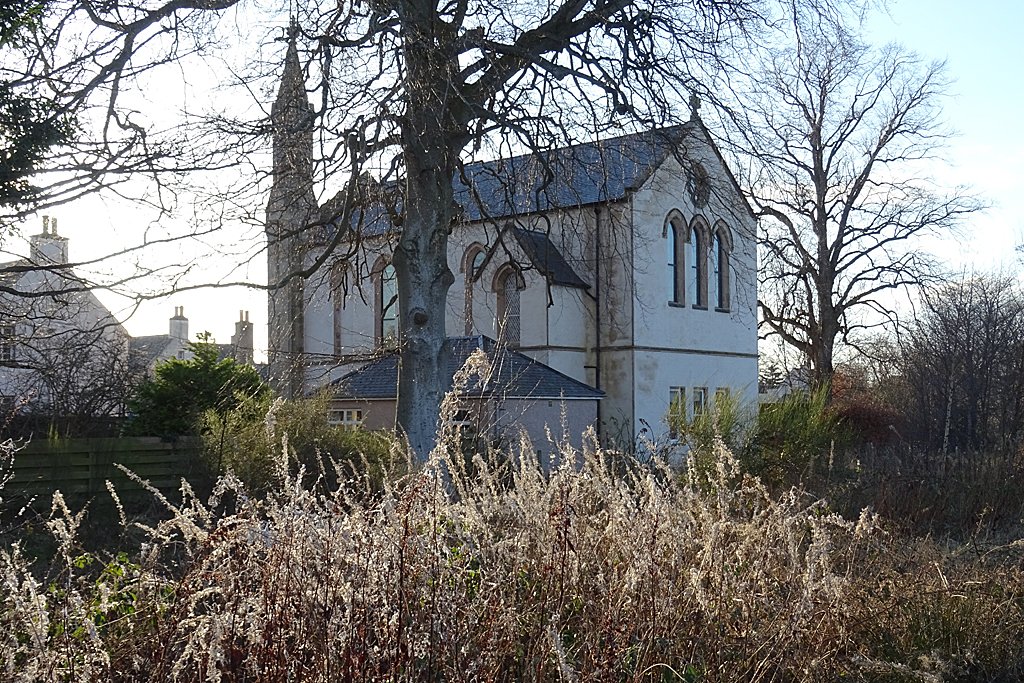
Chapel from the south east

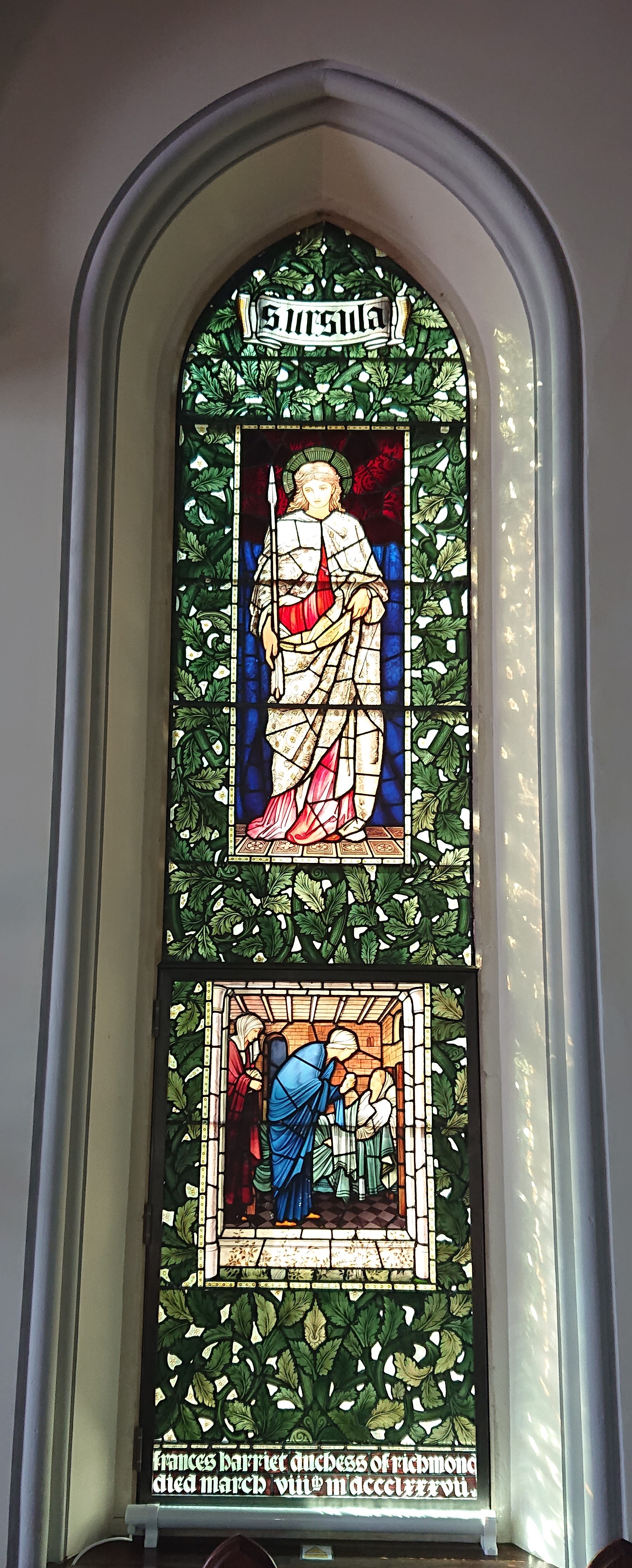
St Ursula, commemorating Frances Gordon-Lennox, Duchess of Richmond

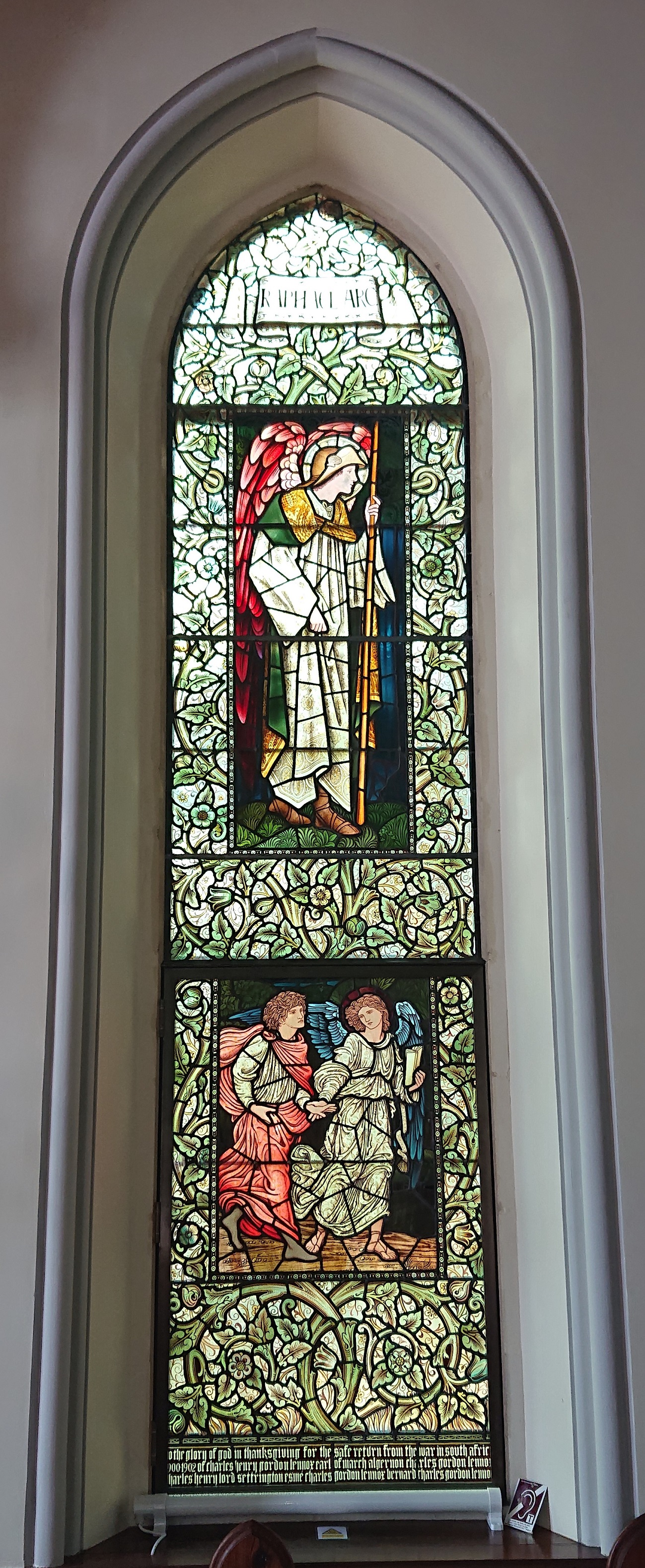
Raphael, giving thanks for the return of Gordon-Lennox family members from the Boer War

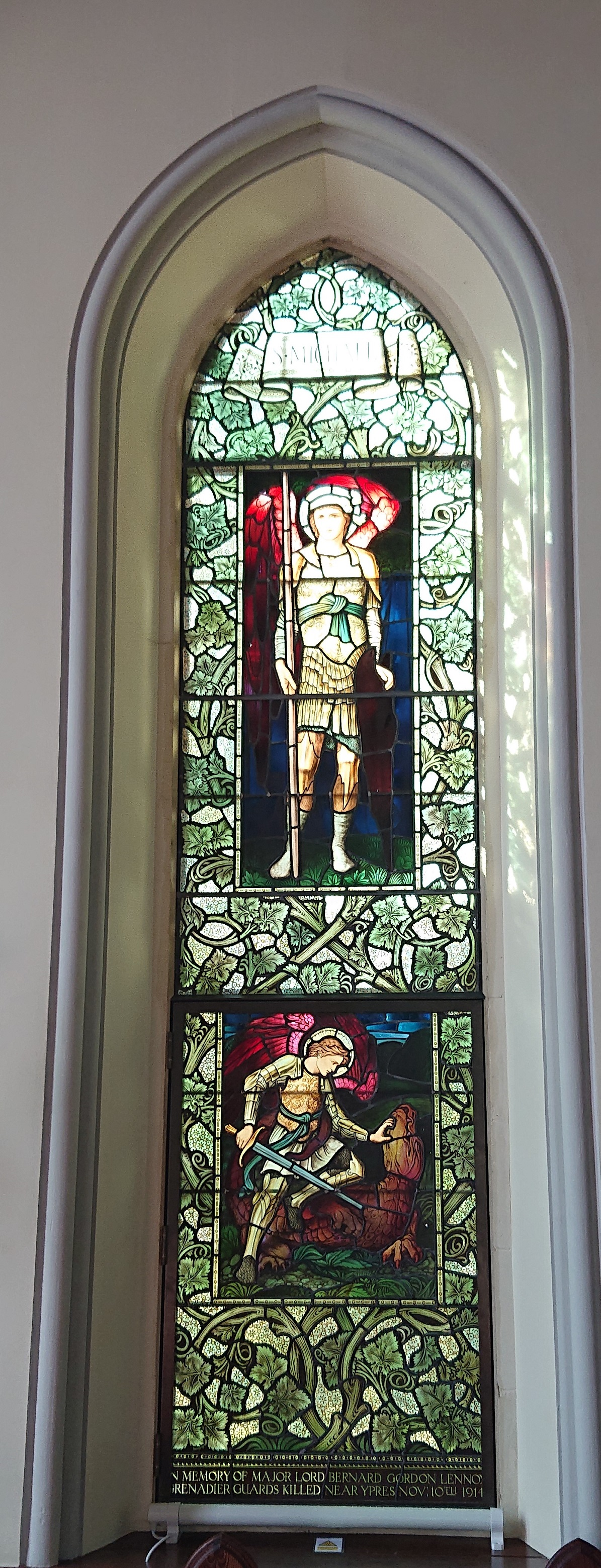
Michael, commemorating Lord Bernard Gordon-Lennox

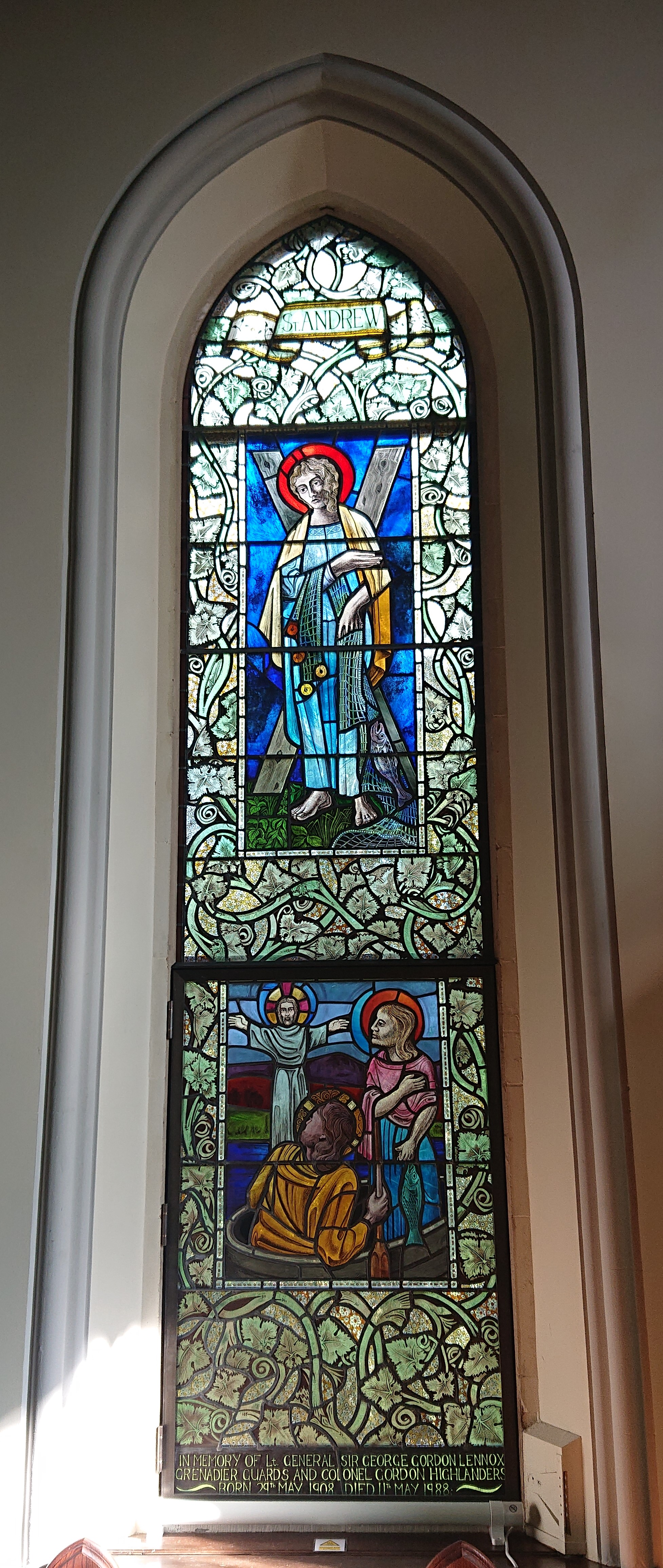
St Andrew, commemorating George Gordon-Lennox

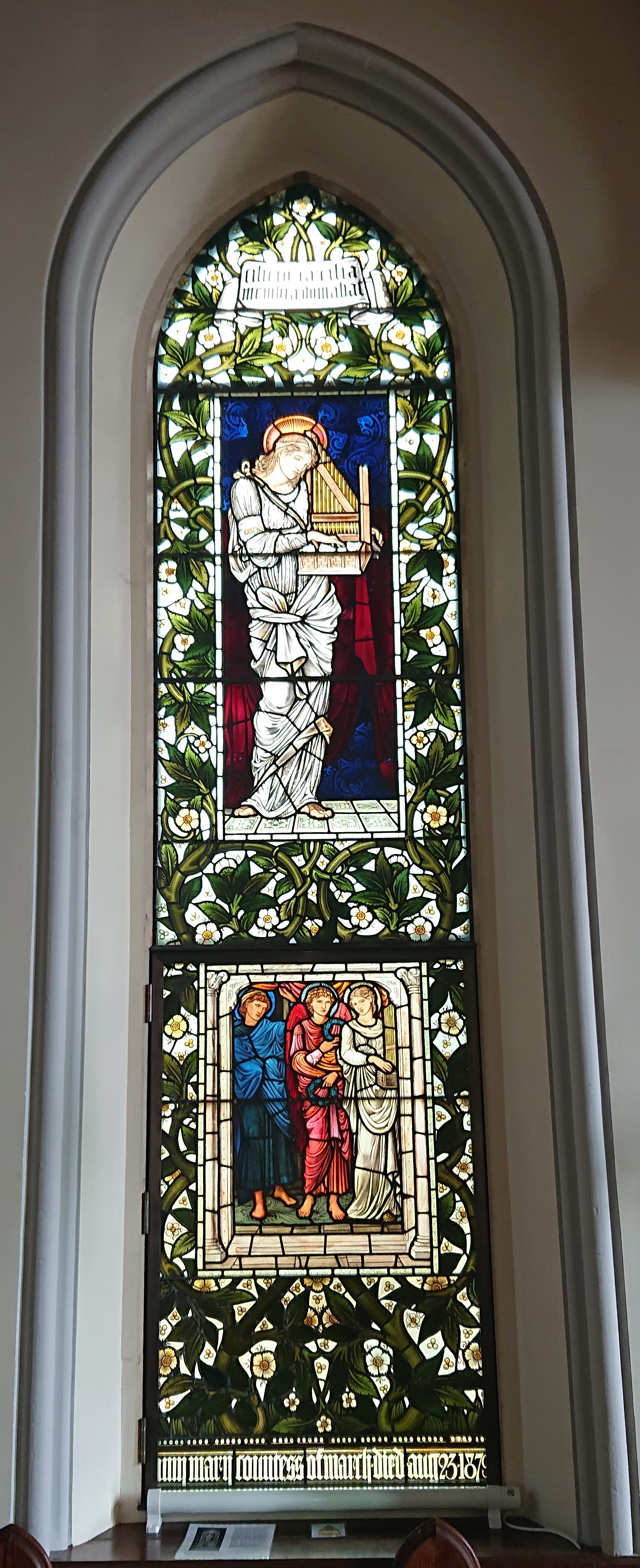
St Cecilia, commemorating Amy Gordon-Lennox, Countess of March

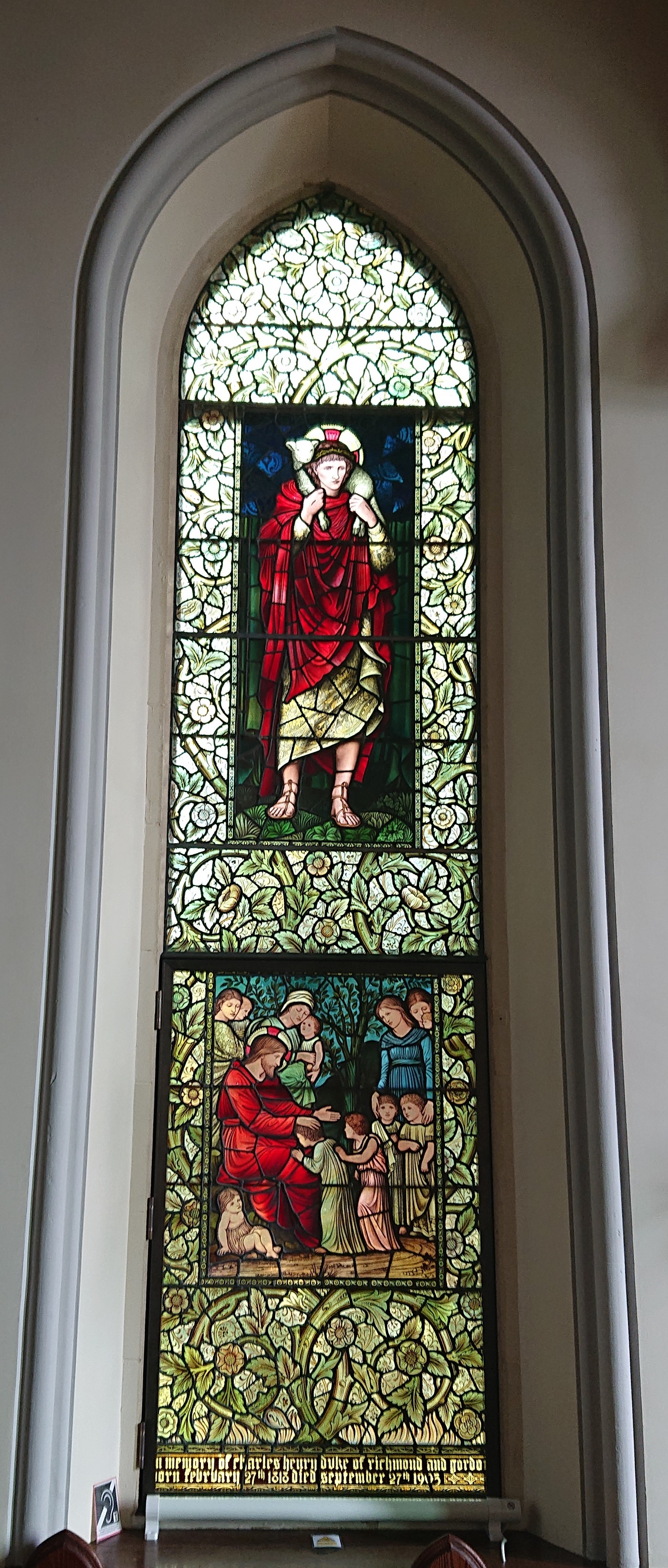
The Good Shepherd, commemorating Charles Gordon-Lennox, 6th Duke of Richmond

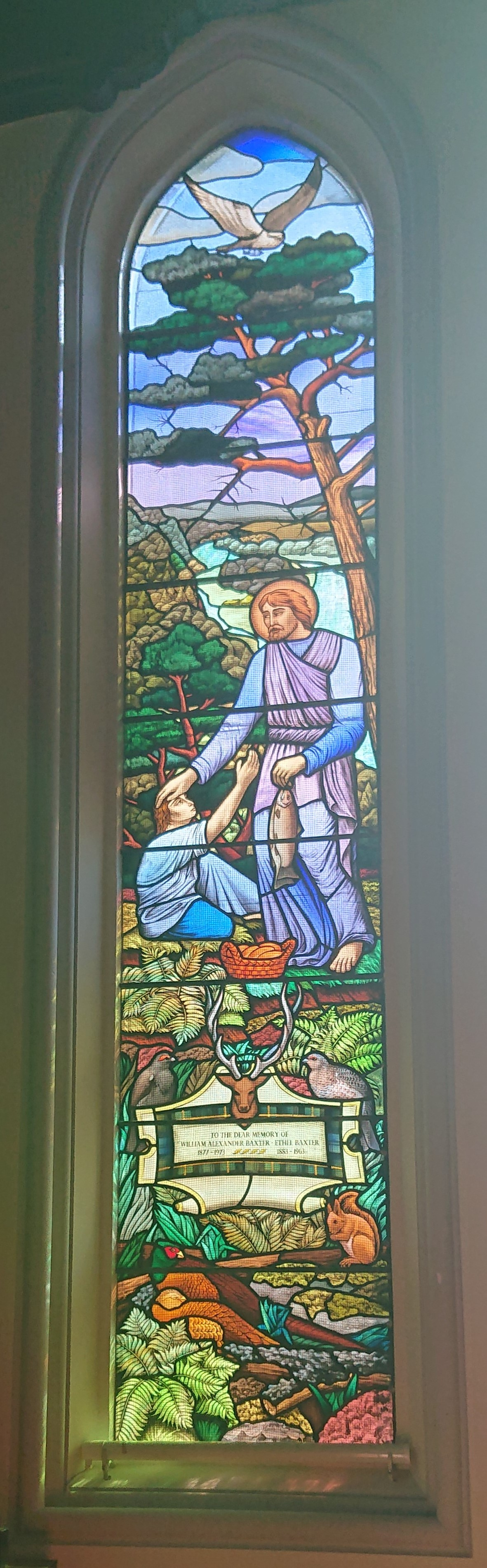
Christ, commemorating William and Ethel Baxter

== Current usage ==
The church is an active place of worship, and is part of the Diocese of Moray, Ross and Caithness of the Scottish Episcopal Church, with weekly services celebrated by Rev Michael Last. The chapel is accessed by a flight of stairs, but services are relayed by CCTV to the chapel room on the ground floor to allow people with mobility issues to partake in them.
