= Claybrook House =

Grade II listed building in Fulham, London

Coordinates: 51.471377°N 0.206737°W

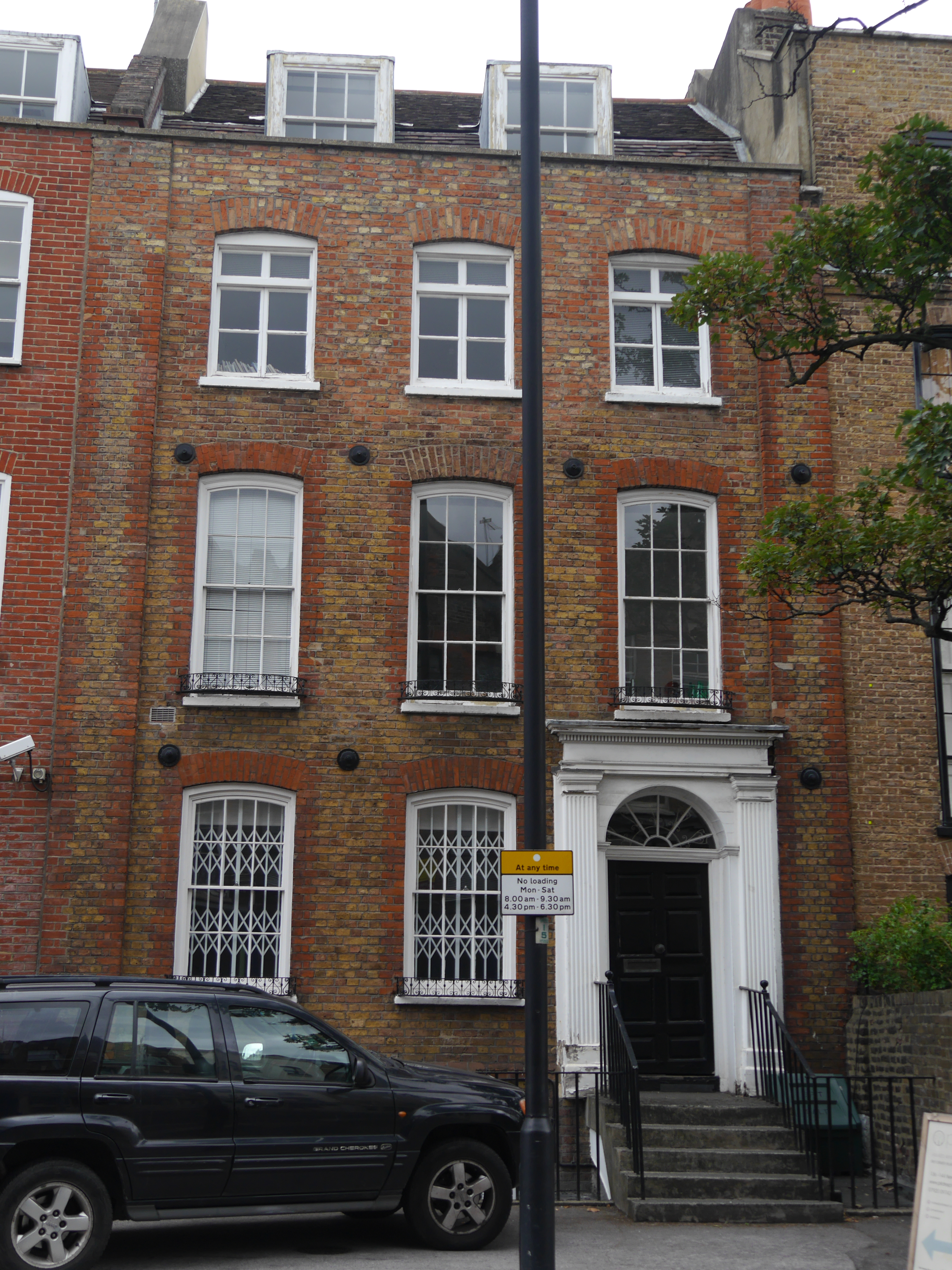
Claybrook House

Claybrook House is a Grade II listed house at 136 New King's Road, Fulham, London.

== History ==
It was built in the early 18th century, and the architect is not known. From 1811 to 1816 (at least), it must have been a school as the diarist Louisa Bain was educated there from the age of seven to twelve.

It is next door to Northumberland House.
