= List of listed buildings in Udny, Aberdeenshire =

This is a list of listed buildings in the parish of Udny in Aberdeenshire, Scotland.

== List ==
Name	Location	Date Listed	Grid Ref. (Note: Sometimes known as OSGB36, the grid reference (where provided) is based on the British national grid reference system used by the Ordnance Survey. • "Guide to National Grid". Ordnance Survey. • "Get-a-map". Ordnance Survey.)	Geo-coordinates	Notes	LB Number (Note: Historic Environment Scotland assign a unique alphanumeric identifier to each designated site in Scotland, for listed buildings this always begins with "LB", for example "LB12345".)	Image
Pitmedden House				57°20′34″N 2°11′37″W	Category C(S)	15924	Upload Photo
Udny Schoolhouse Udny Green (West Side)				57°19′39″N 2°12′03″W	Category C(S)	15953	Upload Photo
Pittrichie South Lodge				57°19′05″N 2°14′15″W	Category C(S)	15929	Upload Photo
Udny Churchyard				57°19′37″N 2°12′03″W	Category C(S)	15952	Upload Photo
Pitmedden Garden And Estate, Farmhouse (Former Laundry), Stable, Open Shed, Steading And Bothy				57°20′35″N 2°11′37″W	Category C(S)	50598	Upload Photo
Pittrichie Home Farm				57°19′17″N 2°14′33″W	Category C(S)	19763	Upload Photo
Primrose Cottage Udny Green (South Side)				57°19′38″N 2°11′58″W	Category C(S)	15919	Upload Photo
Pitmedden Great Garden				57°20′34″N 2°11′31″W	Category A	15925	Upload Photo
Manse Of Udny				57°19′36″N 2°11′54″W	Category C(S)	15920	Upload Photo
Udny Bridge				57°19′30″N 2°11′38″W	Category C(S)	15923	Upload Photo
Udny, Tillycorthie Mansion House Including Walled Garden, Gatepiers, Gates And Boundary Walls				57°18′04″N 2°09′20″W	Category B	50881	Upload Photo
Smiddy Cottage Udny Green (South Side)				57°19′38″N 2°11′59″W	Category C(S)	15918	Upload Photo
Udny Castle				57°19′53″N 2°11′50″W	Category A	15922	Upload Photo
Pitmedden Lime-Kiln				57°20′37″N 2°11′56″W	Category B	15926	Upload Photo
Atholhill Farmhouse				57°20′02″N 2°12′28″W	Category C(S)	15927	Upload Photo
Pitmedden Former Free Church				57°20′12″N 2°10′46″W	Category B	19255	Upload Photo
Udny Castle Lodge And Gates				57°20′15″N 2°11′53″W	Category B	15921	Upload Photo
Udny Mort-House				57°19′37″N 2°12′02″W	Category B	15951	Upload Photo
Pittrichie Dovecot				57°19′15″N 2°14′24″W	Category B	15928	Upload Photo
Udny Parish Church (Christ Church)				57°19′42″N 2°12′03″W	Category B	15950	Upload Photo
Udny Arms Hotel Udny Green (South Side)				57°19′38″N 2°12′01″W	Category C(S)	15954	Upload Photo

== Key ==
The scheme for classifying buildings in Scotland is:

- Category A: "buildings of national or international importance, either architectural or historic; or fine, little-altered examples of some particular period, style or building type."
- Category B: "buildings of regional or more than local importance; or major examples of some particular period, style or building type, which may have been altered."
- Category C: "buildings of local importance; lesser examples of any period, style, or building type, as originally constructed or moderately altered; and simple traditional buildings which group well with other listed buildings."

In March 2016 there were 47,288 listed buildings in Scotland. Of these, 8% were Category A, and 50% were Category B, with the remaining 42% being Category C.

== See also ==
- List of listed buildings in Aberdeenshire
