= Garçon =

Garçon, the French word for "boy", may refer to:

== People ==
- Émile Garçon (1851–1922), French jurist
- Maurice Garçon (1889–1967), French novelist, historian, essayist, and lawyer
- Pierre Garçon (born 1986), American football player
- A waiter in a French or Italian restaurant

== Films and music ==
- Garçon!, a 1983 film by the French author and director Claude Sautet
- "Garçon" (song), a 2007 single by French artist Koxie
- Le Garçon (EP), a 2014 release by Solomon
- Marie et les Garçons, French punk rock band, later known as the Garçons, active 1976–1980

== See also ==
- Garson (disambiguation)
- Garzon (disambiguation)
