= Garson =

Garson may refer to:

== Places ==
- Garson, Manitoba, Canada
- Garson, Ontario, Canada

== Other uses ==
- Garson (surname)

== See also ==
- Garçon (disambiguation)
- Garzon (disambiguation)
