= Charles Edward Stuart =

Jacobite leader (1720–1788)

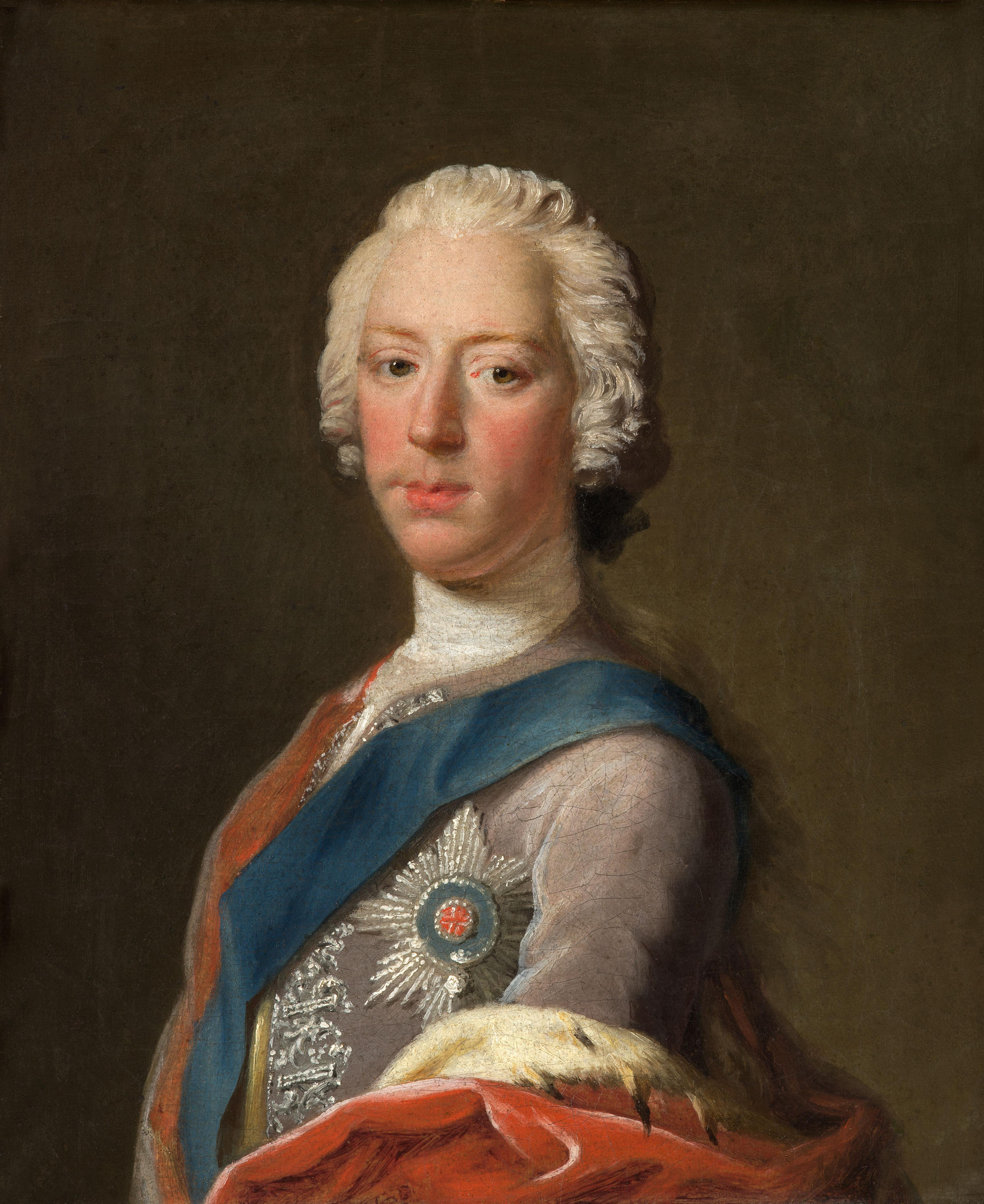
- Portrait by Allan Ramsay, 1745

Jacobite pretender
- Pretendence: 1 January 1766 – 30 January 1788
- Predecessor: "James VIII and III"
- Successor: "Henry IX and I"
- Born: 31 December 1720; Palazzo Muti, Rome, Papal States
- Died: 30 January 1788 (aged 67); Palazzo Muti, Rome, Papal States
- Burial: St Peter's Basilica, Vatican City
- Spouse: Princess Louise of Stolberg-Gedern (m. 1772; sep. 1780)
- Issue: Charlotte Stuart, Duchess of Albany (illegitimate)
Names
- Charles Edward Louis John Sylvester Maria Casimir Stuart (Note: Charles may have also been given the middle name Severino.)
- House: Stuart
- Father: James Francis Edward Stuart
- Mother: Maria Clementina Sobieska

Charles Edward Louis John Sylvester Maria Casimir Stuart (31 December 1720 (Note: Charles was born in Rome under the Gregorian calendar. However, British sources often cite his date of birth as 20 December 1720, as Britain did not switch to the Gregorian calendar until 1752.) – 30 January 1788) was the elder son of James Francis Edward Stuart, making him the grandson of James VII and II, and the Stuart claimant to the thrones of England, Scotland, and Ireland from 1766. He is also known as the Young Pretender, the Young Chevalier and Bonnie Prince Charlie, and to Jacobites as Charles III. He led the failed Jacobite Rising of 1745 in an attempt to restore the Stuart dynasty to the thrones of England, Scotland, and Ireland.

Born in Rome to the exiled Stuart court, he spent much of his early and later life in Italy. In 1744, he travelled to France to take part in a planned invasion of England to restore the Stuart monarchy under his father. When storms partly wrecked the French fleet, Charles resolved to proceed to Scotland following discussion with leading Jacobites. This resulted in Charles landing by ship on the west coast of Scotland, leading to the Jacobite rising of 1745. The Jacobite forces under Charles initially achieved several victories in the field, including the Battle of Prestonpans in September 1745 and the Battle of Falkirk Muir in January 1746. However, by April 1746, Charles was defeated at Culloden, effectively ending the Stuart cause. Although there were subsequent attempts, such as a planned French invasion in 1759, Charles was unable to restore the Stuart monarchy.

With the Jacobite cause lost, Charles spent the remainder of his life on the continent, except for one secret visit to London. On his return, Charles lived briefly in France before he was exiled in 1748 under the terms of the Treaty of Aix-la-Chapelle. Charles eventually returned to Italy, where he spent much of his later life living in Florence and Rome. He had a number of mistresses before marrying Princess Louise of Stolberg-Gedern in 1772. In his later life, Charles's health declined greatly, and he was said to be an alcoholic. However, his escapades during the 1745 and 1746 uprisings and his escape from Scotland led to his portrayal as a romantic figure of heroic failure. His life and the once possible prospects of a restored Stuart monarchy left an enduring historical legend that continued to have a legacy as of the late 20th century.

== Early life ==
=== Childhood and education: 1720–1734 ===
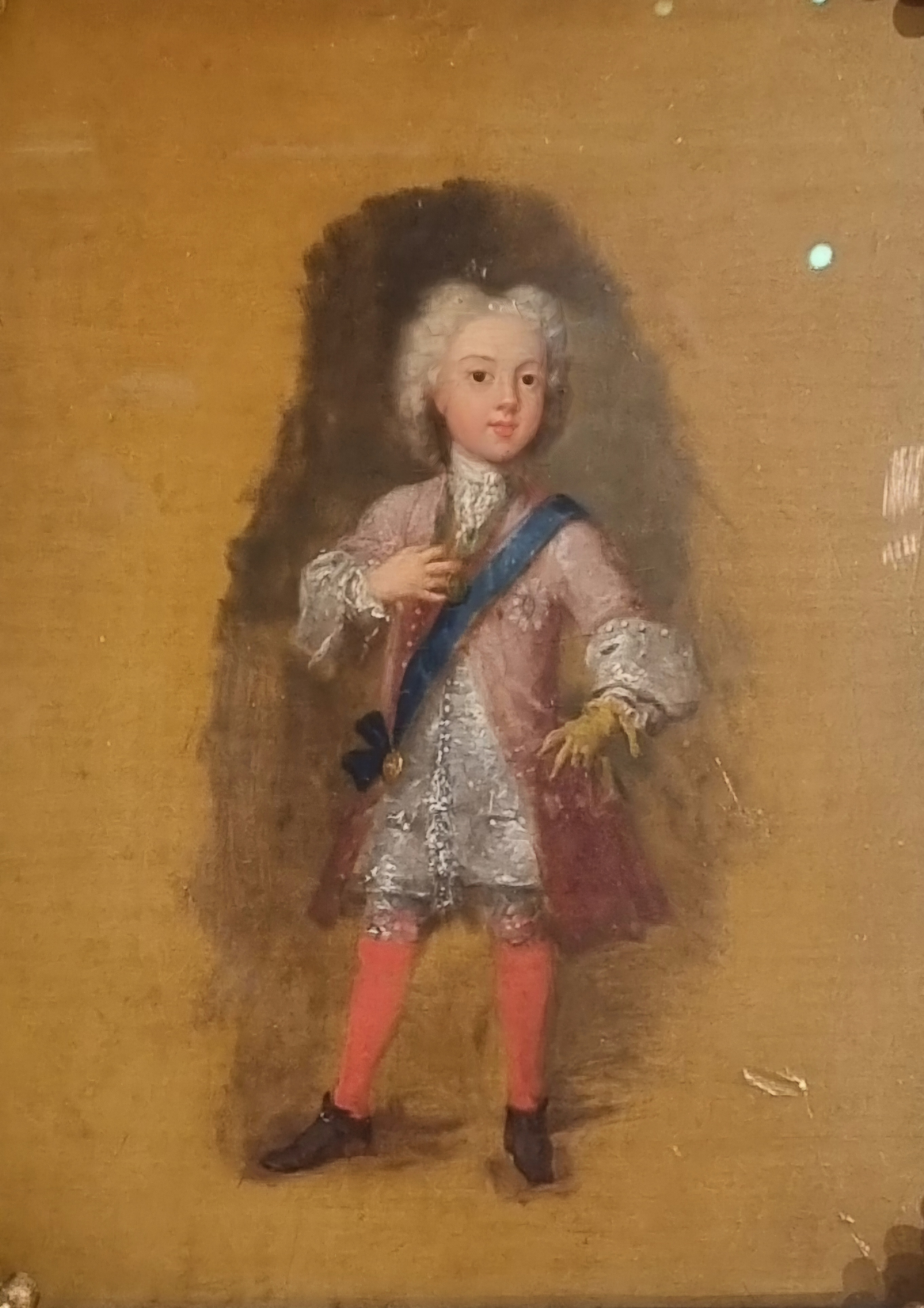
Charles painted as a five year old in 1725 by the court painter Antonio David

Charles was born on 31 December 1720 at the Palazzo Muti in Rome, Italy, where his father had been given a residence by Pope Clement XI. Historians differ as to who carried out his baptism ceremony. Kybett reports that it was presided over by Pope Clement, whereas Douglas and Pininski state it was carried out by the Bishop of Montefiascone. Regardless, he was given the names Charles for his great-grandfather, Edward after Edward the Confessor, Louis for the King of France, Casimir after the kings of Poland, and Sylvester as he was born on Saint Sylvester's Day.

Charles was the son of the Old Pretender, James Francis Edward Stuart (himself son of the exiled Stuart King James II and VII), and Maria Clementina Sobieska, a Polish noblewoman (the granddaughter of John III Sobieski). Charles's grandfather, James II of England and Ireland and VII of Scotland, ruled the kingdoms from 1685 to 1688. He was deposed when the English Parliament invited the Dutch Protestant William III and his wife, Princess Mary, King James's eldest daughter, to replace him in the Revolution of 1688. Many Protestants, including a number of prominent parliamentarians, had been worried that King James aimed to return England fully to the Catholic faith. Since the exile of James and the Act of Settlement, the "Jacobite Cause" had striven to return the Stuarts to the thrones of England and Scotland, which had been united in 1603 under James VI and I, with the parliaments joined by the Acts of Union in 1707 as the Kingdom of Great Britain.

Charles was said to have suffered from weak legs at an early age, possibly as a result of rickets. However, Charles was instructed in a regime of exercise and dancing to help improve his constitution, which strengthened his legs by later years. Charles spent much of his early childhood in Rome and Bologna in the company of a small retinue and a close but often argumentative family. His brother Henry Benedict Stuart was born 5 years later on 6 March 1725. His mother and father were regularly at disagreement with each other, primarily over James's choice of assigning Protestant tutors, leading to one notable incident in which Clementina left the palace shortly after Henry's birth in 1725 and moved to a convent, not returning until 1727. As the legitimate heir to the thrones of England, Scotland, and Ireland—according to the Jacobite succession—James, along with his household, lived with a sense of pride, and staunchly believed in the divine right of kings. Charles spent much of his early years in the company of older men, several of whom acted as his tutors. Charles Edward's governor was the Protestant James Murray, Jacobite Earl of Dunbar. While the Pope had raised initial concerns over Charles's religious education under a Protestant governor, James agreed that Charles would be raised as a Catholic. Among his tutors were the Chevalier Ramsay, Sir Thomas Sheridan and Father Vinceguerra, a Catholic priest. He quickly became conversant in English, French and Italian, although it was said that he never fully mastered any language and was partially illiterate. During his childhood, he was reported to enjoy hunting, horsemanship, a form of golf, music and dancing.

=== Travels in Europe: 1734–1745 ===
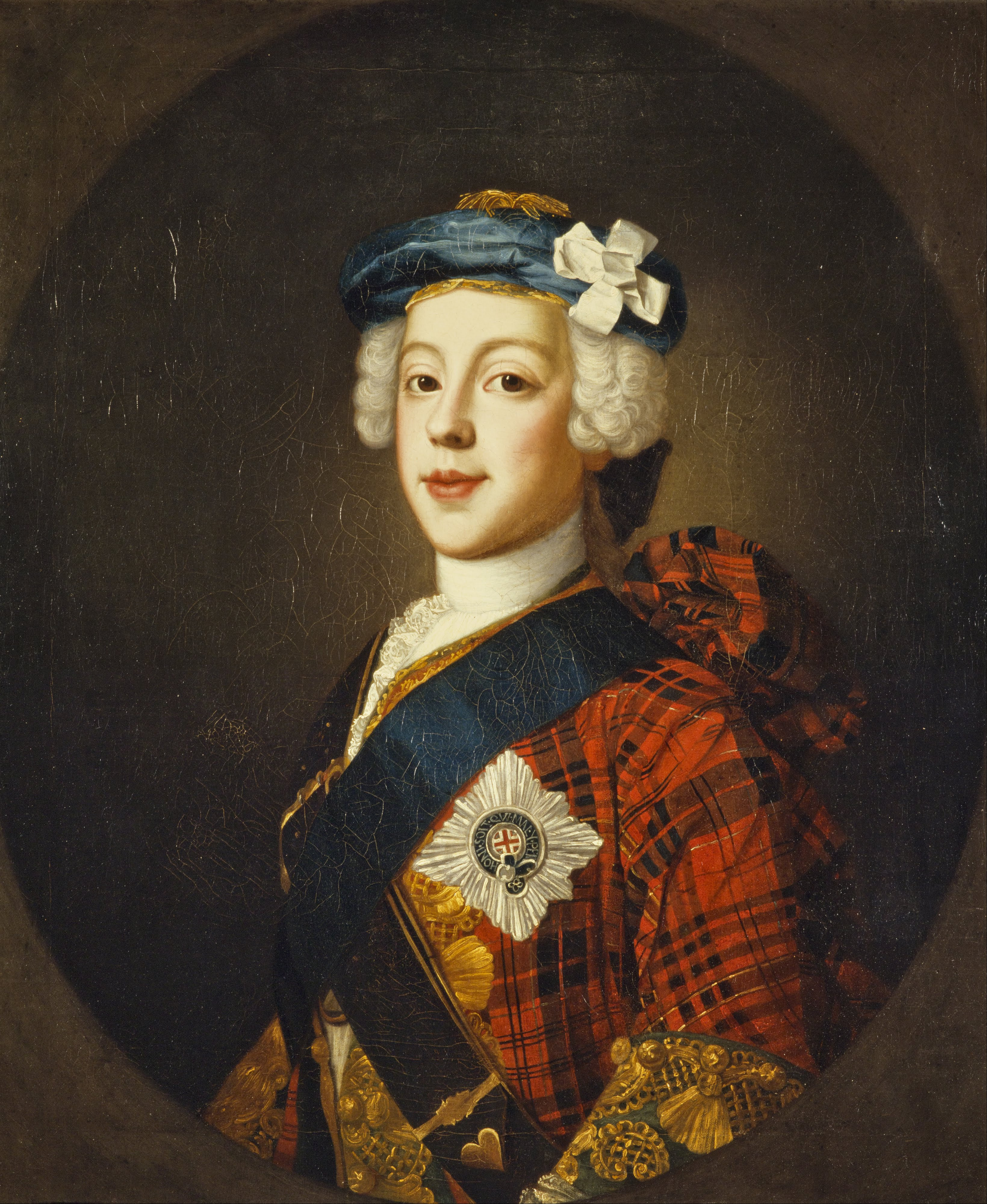
Portrait by William Mosman, painted circa 1737

In 1734, his cousin, the Duke of Liria, who was proceeding to join Don Carlos in his struggle for the crown of Naples, passed through Rome. He offered to take Charles on his expedition, and the boy of thirteen was appointed general of artillery by Don Carlos. On 30 July 1734, he departed Rome with an escort and proceeded with his cousin to the French and Spanish siege of Gaeta, his first exposure to war. While at Gaeta, he observed the final stages of the siege and was said to have come under fire in the trenches of the siegeworks. He returned to Rome in late 1734. In January 1735, shortly after his fourteenth birthday, Charles's mother Clementina died of scurvy. She had been in a poor state of declining health for many months; however, Charles was said to have been deeply distressed after her death.

As Charles grew older, he was introduced by his father and the Pope to Italian society. In 1737, James sent his son on a tour through major Italian cities to complete his education as a prince and man of the world. Charles proceeded to visit Genoa, Florence, Parma, Bologna and Venice. The Italian tour was a shock for Charles, who had believed he would be welcomed as a royal prince. Instead, most European courts would only receive him as the "Duke of Albany" (an historic title adopted by Scottish royals in the 14th century). Despite being Catholic, many European states wished to avoid antagonising Britain, the only exception being Venice.

By the time he had reached 20, he had become a notable member of upper-class society in Rome and had developed a fondness for alcohol and fine clothes, often in excess of his allowance. He had become increasingly distant from his brother due to Henry's devotion to prayer and religious study. His father continued to rely on foreign aid in his attempts to restore himself to the British and Irish thrones. However, Charles became increasingly supportive of the idea of rebellion unassisted by invasion or by support of any kind from abroad. On 23 December 1743, owing to his limited ability to travel to Britain, James named his son Charles prince regent, giving him the authority to act in his name.

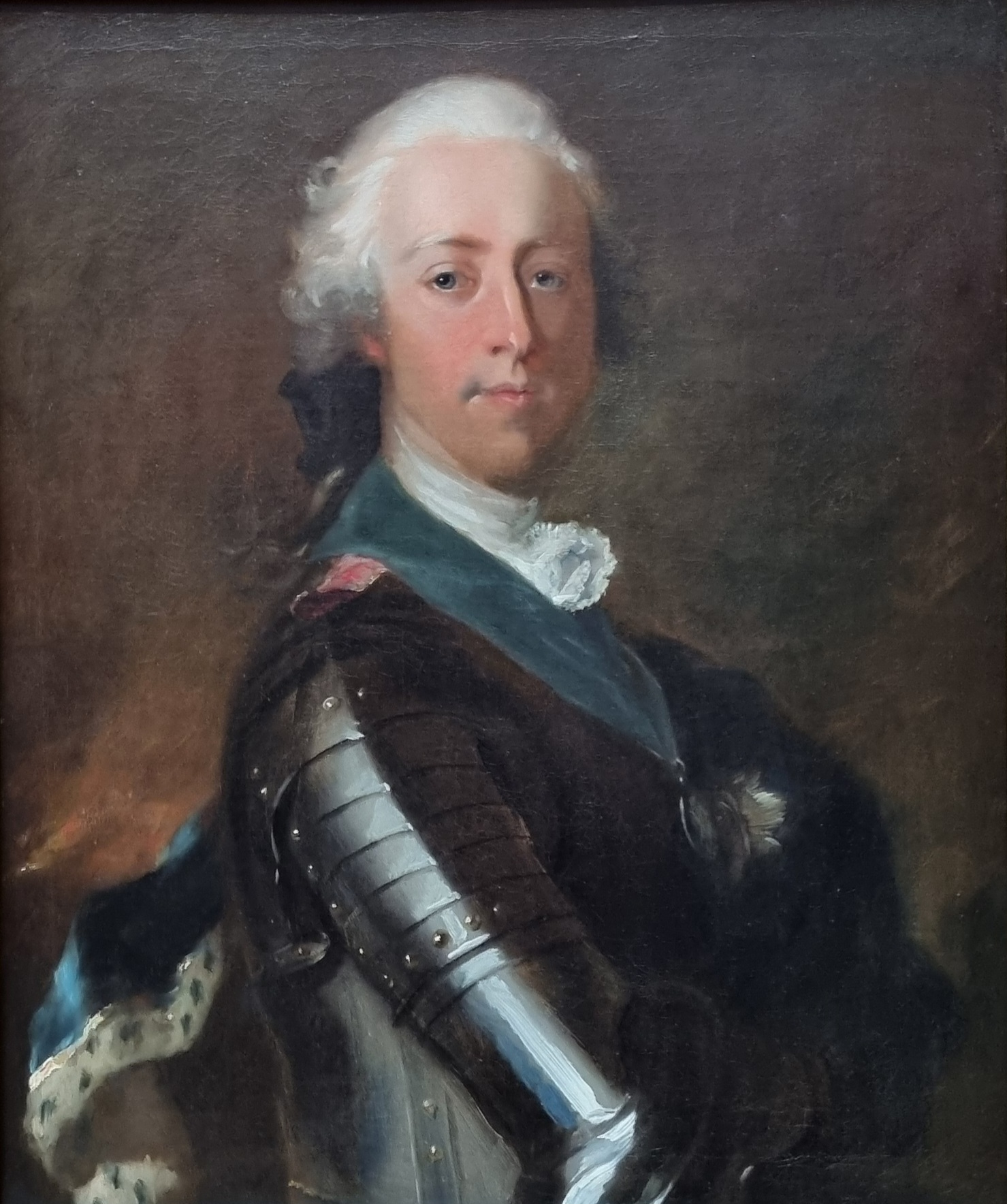
Charles, painted in 1742, by the French court painter Louis Tocqué

In January 1744, his father believed he had managed to obtain the de facto renewed support of the French government. Following this mistaken belief, Charles Edward travelled covertly to France from Rome, initially under the guise of a hunting party. However, neither the French Government nor King Louis XV had officially invited Charles. Nevertheless, by February, the French government had agreed to support a planned invasion of England, hoping to remove British forces from the War of the Austrian Succession. Charles then travelled to Dunkirk with the purpose of accompanying a French Army across to England. The invasion never materialised, as the French fleet was scattered by a storm in the spring equinox, losing 11 ships. By the time it regrouped, the British fleet realised the diversion that had deceived them and resumed their position in the Channel.

After the failure of the planned invasion, Charles remained in France, staying at several places, including Gravelines, Chantilly and Paris, leasing a hilltop house in Montmartre in May 1744. Owing to his expenditure on his wardrobe, attendants and drinking, Charles fell into debt to the amount of 30,000 livres. With news of this and following the failed invasion, the French attempted to encourage Charles to return to Italy by refusing to pay him a monthly subsidy. However, when he could no longer afford the rent on the house in Montmartre, the Archbishop of Cambrai agreed to lend him his country estate near Paris where he stayed until January 1745. Charles then moved to the country house of Anne, Duchess of Berwick in Soissons, following repeated attempts by the French to encourage him to leave the Paris region. However, Charles continued to travel regularly to Paris during this period, often incognito and frequenting the hotels of the city to meet with supporters.

== 1745 uprising ==
=== Preparations and journey to Scotland: 1745 ===
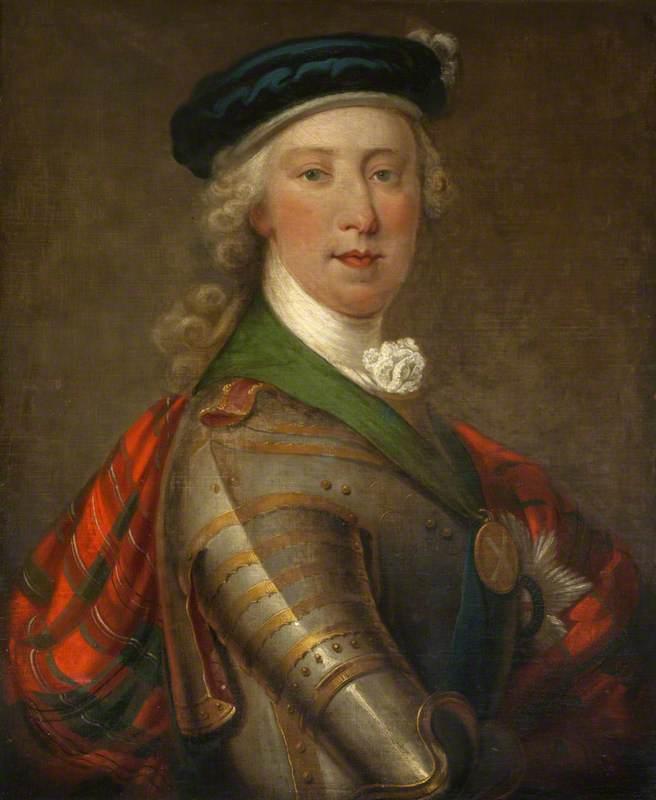
Charles Edward as the Jacobite leader (a painting in Traquair House, attributed to the circle of Louis Tocqué)

In both Rome and Paris, Charles met numerous supporters of the Stuart cause; he knew that Jacobite representatives were in every key European court. He had now taken a considerable share in correspondence and other work promoting his and his father's interests. While in Paris and Soissons, Charles sought funding and support to restore the monarchy. Following conversations with Irish and Scottish exiles such as Sir Thomas Sheridan who assured him of the strength of the Jacobite movement in Scotland, as well as following receipt of a petition to Charles from Sir Hector Maclean on behalf of intervention, Charles resolved to launch an expedition to Scotland. The ultimate aim was to instigate a rebellion that would place his father on the thrones of England, Scotland, and Ireland. To assist with funding the expedition, Charles borrowed some 180,000 livres from the Paris bankers John Waters and George Waters. Part of these funds had been raised through support from loyalists in Britain such as Sir Henry Bedingfield of Oxburgh Hall. As security for the loans, Charles was able to use the Sobieski crown jewels of his great-grandfather John III Sobieski, which had passed down to him through his mother. He used these extensive funds to purchase weapons and fit out the Elisabeth, an old man-of-war of 66 guns, and the Du Teillay (sometimes called Doutelle), a 16-gun privateer.

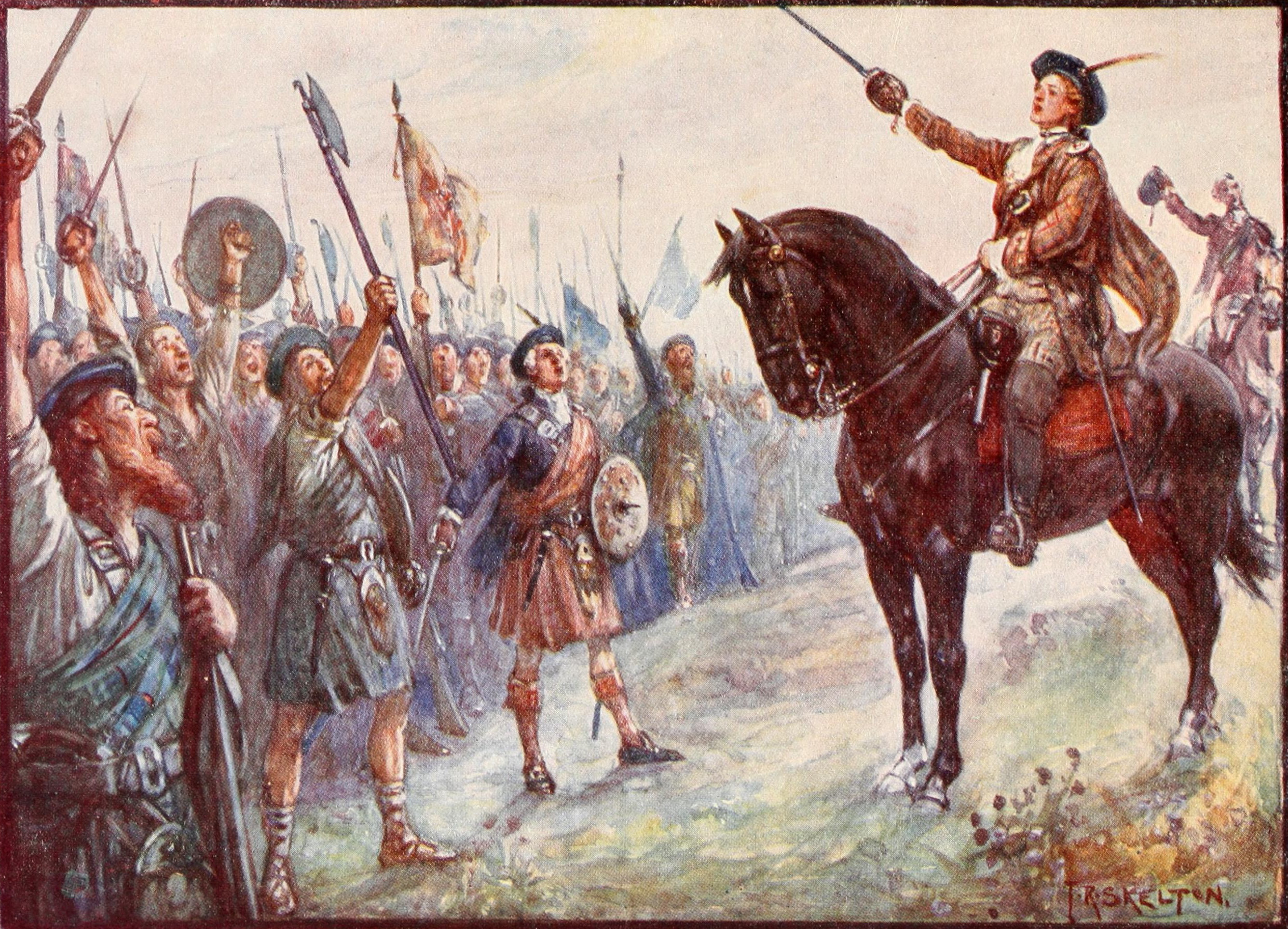
A 1907 illustration of Prince Charles seen on the battlefield in 1746

Encouraged by the French victory in May 1745 at the Battle of Fontenoy, Charles and his party set sail on 5 July for Scotland. During the voyage north, Charles's squadron was fired upon by HMS Lion in the Celtic Sea. The Du Teillay, with Charles on board, made sail to escape, while the Elisabeth, with her greater firepower, engaged Lion. When Lion withdrew, the Elisabeth was forced to return to Brest for repairs, taking the majority of Charles's supplies, including some 1,800 broadswords, 8 artillery pieces and most of the 1,500 muskets he had purchased. The Du Teillay successfully landed him and seven companions at Eriskay on 23 July 1745. The group would later be known as the Seven Men of Moidart and included John O'Sullivan, an Irish exile and former French officer, and Charles's secretary George Kelly. He also appointed another secretary John Hay of Restalrig in 1745. Many Catholic and Protestant Highland clans still supported the Jacobite cause, and Charles hoped for a warm welcome from these clans to start an insurgency by Jacobites throughout Britain. However, receiving a cool reception from the clan leaders there, many of those contacted advised him to return to France, including MacDonald of Sleat and Norman MacLeod. Aware of the potential impact of defeat, they felt that by arriving without French military support, Charles had failed to keep his commitments and was unconvinced by his personal qualities. Charles, however, believed that French military support could only be acquired if the uprising had already started. Undeterred by his reception, Charles set sail again and arrived at the bay of Loch nan Uamh. He had hoped for support from a French fleet, but it was not forthcoming, and he decided to raise an army in Scotland.

=== Early stages and victory at Prestonpans: 1745 ===
Although several clan chiefs initially discouraged him, he gained the crucial support of Donald Cameron of Lochiel, Chief of Clan Cameron, after Charles provided "security for the full value of his estate should the rising prove abortive." Thereafter, support continued to grow. It is recorded that during this time, Charles began to take lessons in conversational Gaelic under the tutorship of Alasdair mac Mhaighstir Alasdair. On 19 August, he raised his father's standard at Glenfinnan and gathered a force large enough to enable him to march towards Edinburgh. The force proceeded eastwards, reaching Invergarry Castle by the last week of August. Charles's forces continued on via the Corrieyairack Pass, where their control of the pass persuaded advancing government forces to withdraw from the area. Stopping briefly first at Blair Castle, Charles and his forces reached Perth on 4 September. At Perth, his ranks were joined by more sympathisers, including Lord George Murray. Previously pardoned for his participation in the 1715 and 1719 risings, Murray took over from O'Sullivan due to his better understanding of Highland military customs, and the Jacobites spent the next week re-organising their forces. On 14 September, Charles and his forces took Falkirk, and Charles stayed at Callendar House, where he persuaded the Earl of Kilmarnock to join him. (Note: Charles would stay again at Callendar House before the Battle of Falkirk Muir. The Earl however would later be executed for his support of Charles in August 1746.)

Charles's progress onto Edinburgh was helped by the action of the British leader, General Sir John Cope, who had marched to Inverness, leaving the south country undefended. On 16 September, Charles and his army encamped outside the city at Gray's Mill in Longstone. Lord Provost Archibald Stewart controlled the city, which quickly surrendered. However, the castle under the command of George Preston did not surrender and was blockaded until Charles later called off the siege owing to a lack of artillery. A mutual agreement was reached between the Jacobites and the castle wherein the garrison would not fire onto the suburbs of Edinburgh, and, in exchange, the Jacobites would not blockade the transport of food into the castle. On 17 September, Charles entered Edinburgh, accompanied by around 2,400 men. During this time, Charles also gave trophies to his supporters, a prominent example being Prince Charlie's Targe. Allan Ramsay painted a portrait of Charles while he was in Edinburgh, which survived in the collection of the Earl of Wemyss at Gosford House and, as of 2016, was on display at the Scottish National Portrait Gallery.

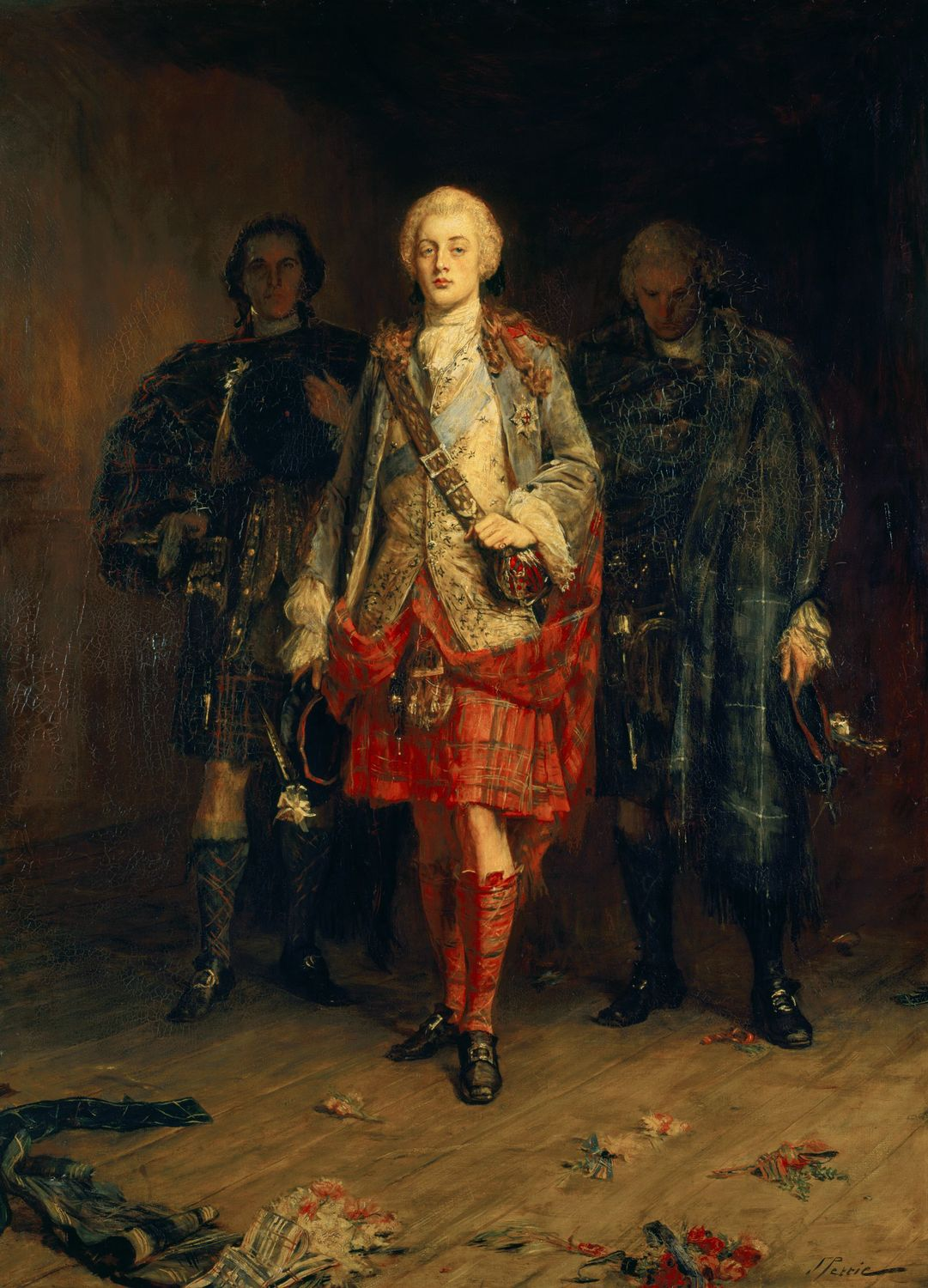
Bonnie Prince Charlie Entering the Ballroom at Holyroodhouse flanked by Donald Cameron of Lochiel and Alexander Forbes, Lord Pitsligo, painted by John Pettie, c. 1892

Meanwhile, Sir John Cope had brought his forces by sea to Dunbar, a decision he would soon regret. On 20 September, Charles mustered and joined his forces at Duddingston. On 21 September, Charles and his forces defeated Cope's army, the only government army in Scotland, at the Battle of Prestonpans. (Note: Cope and his army's disastrous defence against the Jacobites was later immortalised in the song "Johnnie Cope".) Charles was said to have been only 50 paces from the front-line of the battle, and he later expressed remorse that the victory involved killing his own subjects. It was reported during the battle that Charles and Lord Murray had argued over the disposition of forces. The historian Hugh Douglas argues this was to result in an ever-worsening relationship between the two that would culminate with ultimate defeat later at Culloden.

=== Invasion of England: 1745–1746 ===
Morale was high following the battle at Prestonpans, and Charles returned to Edinburgh, holding court at Holyrood Palace. Jacobite morale was further boosted in mid-October when the French landed with supplies of money and weapons and an envoy, which seemed to validate Charles's claims of French backing. However, Lord Elcho later claimed that his fellow Scots were already concerned by Charles's autocratic style and fear his Irish advisors overly influenced him.

A "Prince's Council" of senior leaders was established; Charles resented it as an imposition by the Scots on their divinely appointed monarch, while the daily meetings accentuated divisions between the factions. The council was said to include Perth, Lord George Murray, Thomas Sheridan, John O'Sullivan, Murray of Broughton, Lochiel, Keppoch, Clanranald, Glencoe, Ardsheal and Lochgarry. The option to remain in Scotland was considered but Charles had confidently proposed marching into England via Berwick and then onto Newcastle to meet General Wade's forces. A discussion then took place and while the council was persuaded to agree to invade England, it was felt an approach by way of Carlisle would better suit their forces as they lacked sufficient artillery for investing the stronger walls of Berwick. Charles was obliged to acquiesce.

On 2 November, the main army headed south to Carlisle (with a smaller column making a brief feint to the east to Kelso and as if to Wooler to provide a distraction to Wade). The army numbered approximately 6,000 men. On 9 November Charles army began to surround Carlisle. The blockade was completed by 13 November, while Charles himself stayed with a part of his force at nearby Brampton. Owing to the castle and walls being in a poor state of repair and with no prospect of relief by Wade's force, the town and castle of Carlisle eventually agreed to surrender to Charles on 15 November. On 18 November, Charles made a triumphal entry into Carlisle on a white charger and resided at Highmore House. Charles held a council of war again in Carlisle, where it was discussed to either remain in Carlisle or continue an advance further into England.

After receiving encouraging reports of the potential support of Jacobites in Lancashire, Charles and his council agreed to continue south. Charles and his army left Carlisle (leaving a small garrison) and proceeded onto Penrith, arriving there on 21 November. Continuing on Charles and his army then reached Kendal by the evening of 23 November, where he resided at Stricklandgate in the town. His forces then continued south to Preston on the 26 November and Manchester on 29 November. Charles resided at a townhouse at 44 Manchester Street and levied taxes on the town, as well as issuing a proclamation for the repair of local bridges. While at Manchester, Charles ordered local Jacobite volunteers and those from Lancashire to be formed as the Manchester Regiment, though numbers of volunteers were significantly below what he had expected. On 1 December, he headed with his army to Macclesfield where he remained for several days before departing for Leek and then further south to Derby. Charles stayed at Exeter House with his main force, leading elements of his army progressed as far south as the River Trent at Swarkestone Bridge in Derbyshire, arriving there on 4 December.

At Derby, despite Charles's objections, his council decided to return to Scotland given the lack of English Jacobite and French support. There were also rumours that large government forces were being amassed. Charles admitted that he had not heard from the English Jacobites since leaving France despite claiming the contrary; this caused his relationship with some of the Scots to become irretrievably damaged. Charles was said to be manifestly distraught at the decision and had tried, without success, to persuade his council to continue on to London.

The result was that on 6 December, the Jacobite forces and Charles left Derby and began their march north back to Scotland. Charles's route north was the same as that he had taken on the journey south. He returned via Stockport to Manchester on 9 December, and after some light resistance from the local population, Charles demanded £5,000 from the town, eventually receiving £2,500 in payment. With government forces in close pursuit, Charles and his army resumed their journey north, proceeding on through Preston, Lancaster, and Kendal until the Jacobite forces eventually met the government forces at Clifton near Penrith in Cumbria on 18 December.

The Jacobite forces won the Clifton Moor Skirmish, allowing them to continue north to Carlisle. Charles re-entered Carlisle on 19 December with his army and ordered the Manchester Regiment to stay behind as garrison in the castle, leaving behind the sick as well as some his cannons. Leaving Carlisle, he crossed the river Esk with his forces and returned to Scotland.

=== Scotland, Culloden and return to France: 1746 ===
Charles and his forces reached Glasgow on 26 December, resting until 3 January 1746. The decision was then made to lay siege to Stirling and Stirling Castle. However, while the town surrendered immediately, the castle's artillery proved too strong for the Jacobite forces to approach and seize the castle. Government forces also attempted a relief of the siege, which resulted in a victory for Charles in the ensuing Battle of Falkirk Muir in January 1746. A failure to take the castle, however, resulted in the abandonment of the siege and the Jacobite forces moving northward to Crieff, then Moy and Inverness. In February, while resting in Moy at Moy Hall, Charles narrowly avoided capture by an advance party of government forces that had been sent to capture him as the party had been detected by four local men on sentry at the roadside to the hall. With a halt in operations until the weather improved, Charles forces then rested at Inverness, including a stay of some four days at Kilravock Castle. Charles and his troops were then required to move after word reached them of the pursuit against them by the forces of George II's son Prince William, Duke of Cumberland.

Government forces caught up with Charles and his army at the ensuing Battle of Culloden on 16 April. Charles ignored the advice of his subordinate Lord George Murray and chose to fight on flat, open, marshy ground, where his forces were exposed to superior firepower from government troops. To ensure his safety, his officers requested that Charles command his army from behind the front lines, preventing him from gaining a clear view of the battlefield. He hoped that Cumberland's army would attack first, and he had his men stand exposed to the accurate fire from government artillery batteries. Seeing the error in this, he quickly ordered an attack, but his messenger was killed before the order could be delivered. The Jacobite attack was uncoordinated, charging into withering musket fire and grapeshot fired from the cannons, and it met with little success. In the centre, the Jacobites reached the first line of government troops, but a second line of soldiers eventually repulsed this attack. The remaining Jacobite survivors in the front line fled. However, the Jacobite Army units fighting on the north-eastern side of the battlefield, as well as Irish and Scots regulars in the second line, retired in good order, allowing Charles and his personal retinue to escape northwards.

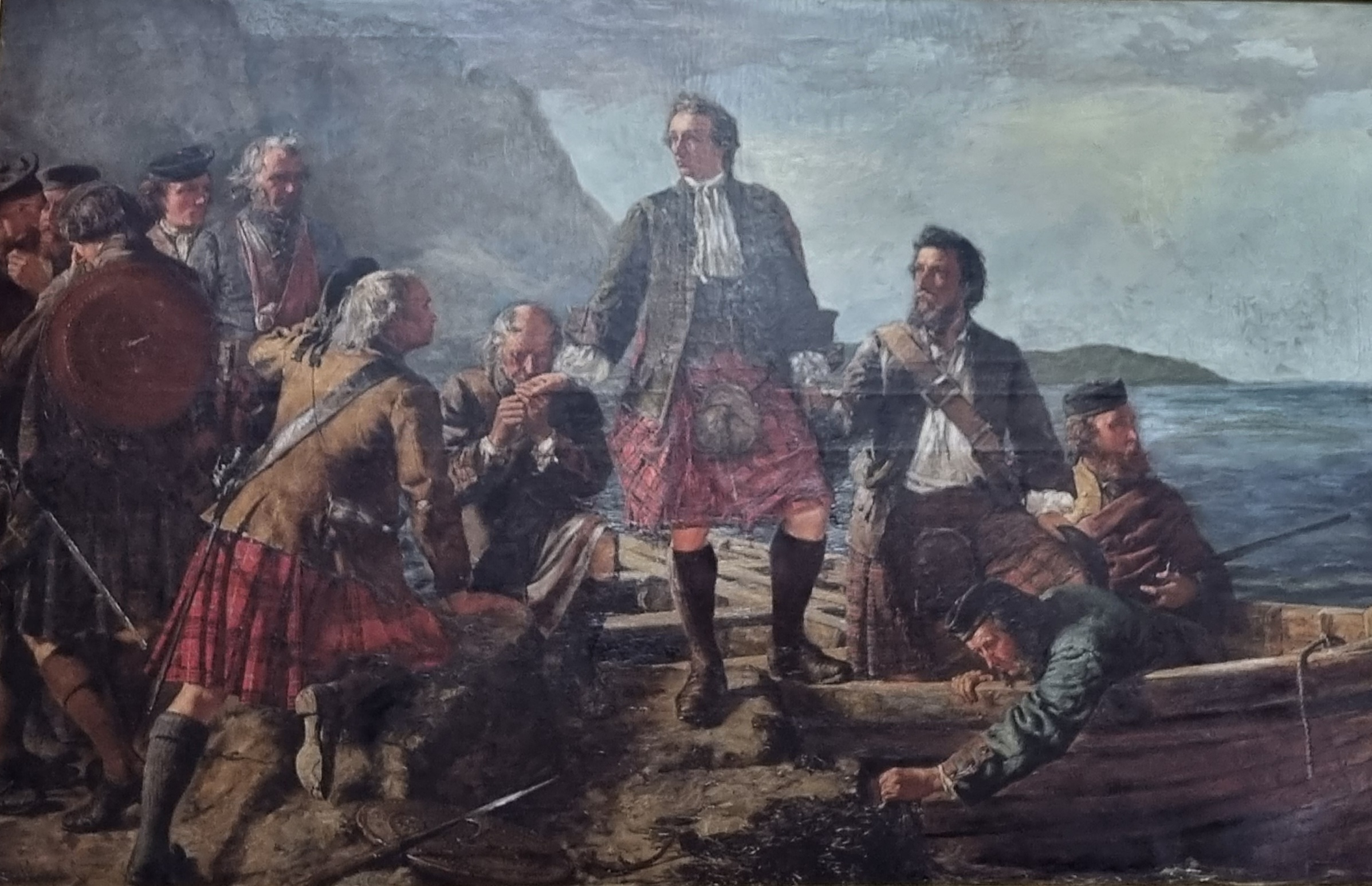
'Lochaber No More – Prince Charlie leaving Scotland', an 1863 painting by the artist John Blake MacDonald

After the defeat, Murray led a group of Jacobites to Ruthven, intending to continue the fight. Charles thought he was betrayed and that his men had abandoned the Jacobite cause. (Note: A first-hand account of these events is given by James, the Chevalier de Johnstone in his "Memoir of the Rebellion 1745–1746".) Some 20 miles from the battlefield, Charles rested briefly at Gorthleck, the home of his dubious supporter Lord Lovat, before retreating to Invergarry Castle, by way of Fort Augustus, on 16 April. Charles then hid in the moors of the Highlands of Scotland, before making a flight to the Hebrides, always barely ahead of the government forces. Many Highlanders aided him during his escape, and none betrayed him for the £30,000 reward. While Charles was in the Hebrides, funds had arrived from Spain and France on two ships that called at Lochaber. Too late to assist Charles following Culloden, only the Spanish gold was landed, but much of it was lost.

Charles was assisted by supporters such as the pilot Donald Macleod of Galtrigill and Captain Con O'Neill, who took him to Benbecula. From 16 April until 28 June, Charles travelled through Benbecula, South Uist, North Uist, Harris, and the Isle of Lewis. On 28 June, Charles was aided by Flora MacDonald, who helped him sail to the Isle of Skye and then to Raasay by taking him in a boat disguised as her maid "Betty Burke". When the residents of Skye and Raasay noticed Charles's "un-ladylike" manners, it was attributed to "Betty Burke" being an Irish woman. Charles remained on Skye until 8 July when he crossed back to the mainland to Morar. With the aid of a few loyal servants and local supporters, Charles hid from government forces in the western Grampian Mountains for several weeks. He ultimately evaded capture, and on 19 September, he left the country aboard the French frigate L'Heureux, commanded by Richard Warren. The Prince's Cairn marks the traditional spot on the shores of Loch nan Uamh in Lochaber from which he made his final departure from Scotland.

== Later life ==
=== Life in Europe: 1746–1766 ===
Charles landed back in France on 10 October [O.S. 29 September] 1746. On his return, he was initially received warmly by King Louis XV, but as far as obtaining additional military or political assistance was concerned, his efforts proved fruitless. However, he became at once the popular hero and idol of many Parisians on account of his exploits in Scotland. In March 1747, he travelled briefly to Madrid via Lyon for an audience with Ferdinand VI of Spain, but the King rejected the idea of Spain providing help to restore the Stuarts. His relationship with his brother Henry deteriorated during this time, when Henry accepted a cardinal's hat in July 1747. He also deliberately broke off communication with his father in Rome (who had approved of his brother's action).

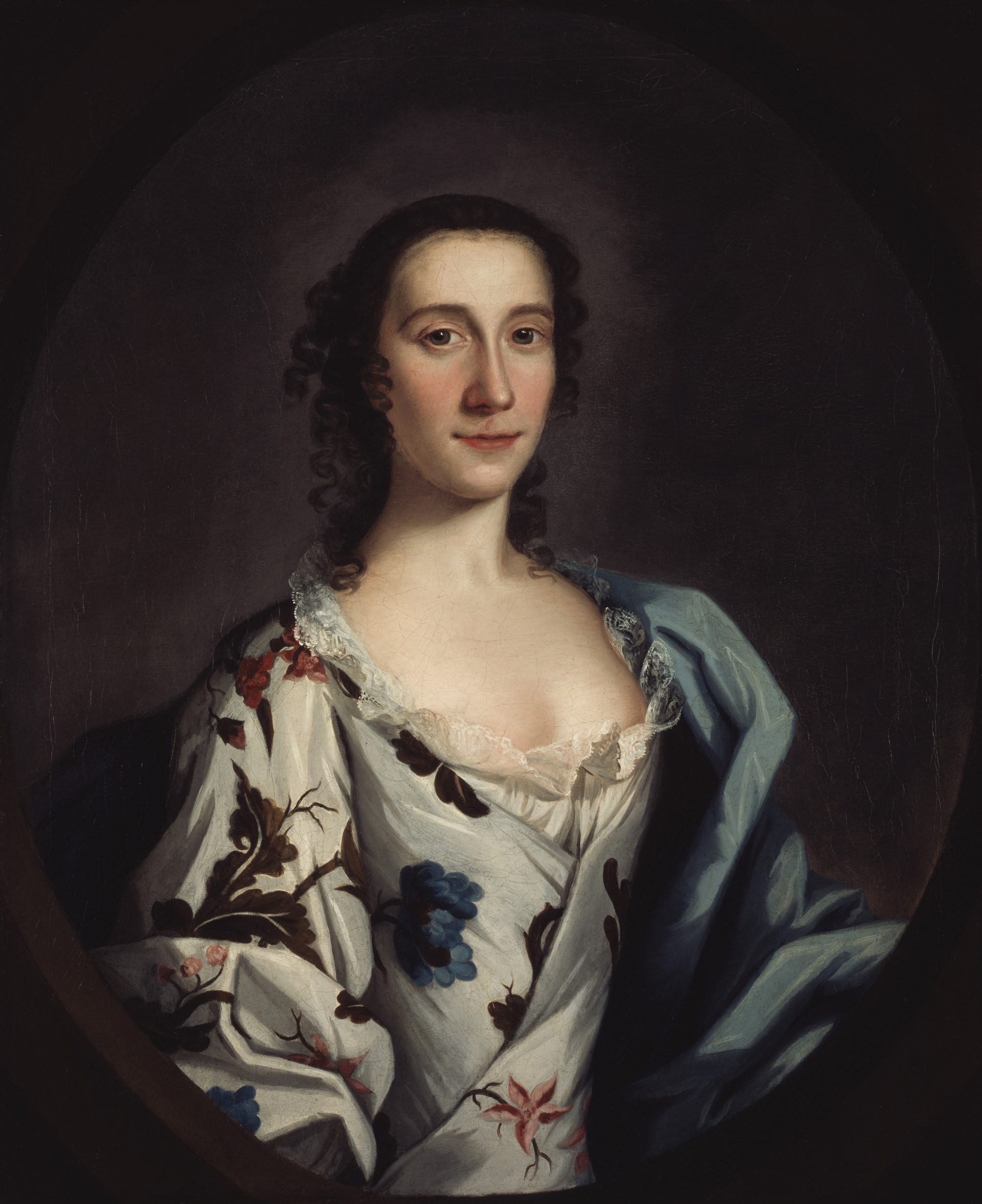
Clementina Walkinshaw 1760

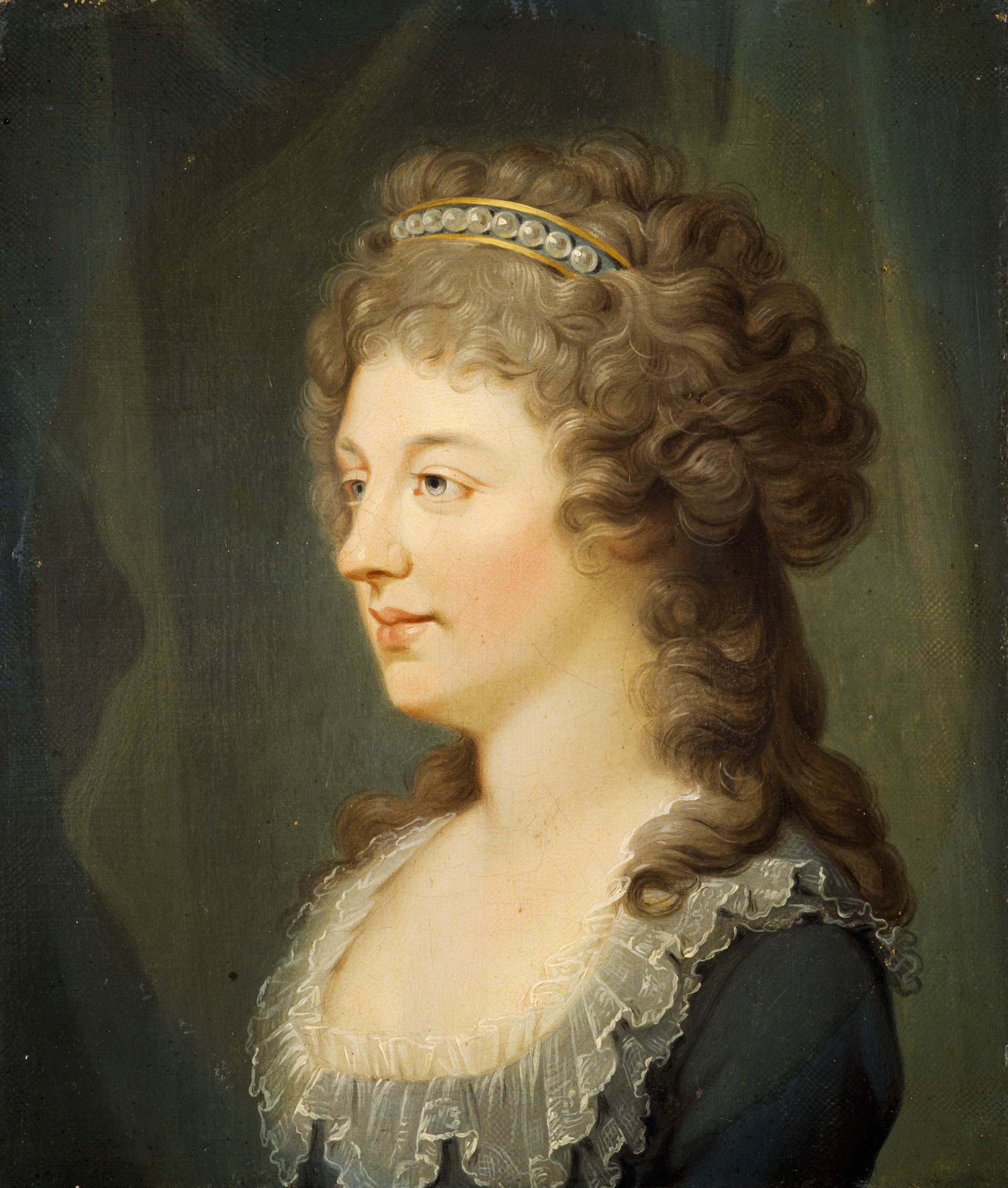
Charlotte Stuart, Duchess of Albany was the only child of Charles to survive infancy (painted by Hugh Douglas Hamilton)

While back in France, Charles had numerous mistresses. He had a relationship with his first cousin Marie Louise de La Tour d'Auvergne, wife of Jules, Prince of Guéméné, that resulted in a short-lived son named Charles (born 28 July 1748, died 18 January 1749). In December 1748, he was arrested by the French authorities while attending the opera at the Théâtre du Palais-Royal. Briefly imprisoned with John Roy Stewart at the Château de Vincennes, he was then expelled from France under the terms of the Treaty of Aix-la-Chapelle that ended the War of the Austrian Succession. He moved first to the Papal territory at Avignon, and then in 1749 to Lunéville in the Duchy of Lorraine. (Note: The Duchy was annexed to France in 1766.) In the following years, he was reported to have made several visits in secret to Paris, but was not discovered by the French authorities.

After his defeat, Charles indicated to the remaining supporters of the Jacobite cause in England that, accepting the impossibility of his recovering the English and Scottish crowns while he remained a Catholic, he was willing to commit himself to reigning as a Protestant. Accordingly, he visited London incognito in 1750, staying for several weeks primarily at the Essex Street London residence of Lady Primrose, the widow of the 3rd Viscount of Primrose. While in London, Charles abjured the Catholic faith and conformed to the Protestant faith by receiving Anglican communion, likely at one of the remaining non-juring chapels. Bishop Robert Gordon, a staunch Jacobite whose house in Theobald's Row was one of Charles's safe-houses for the visit, is the most likely to have celebrated the communion. A chapel in Gray's Inn, used by the nonjurors, was suggested as the venue as early as 1788. (Note: Reported in the Gentleman's Magazine, 1788.) This rebuts David Hume's suggestion that it took place at a church in the Strand. and biographers such as Kybett who have suggested St Martin-in-the-Fields.

Charles lived for several years in exile with his Scottish mistress, Clementina Walkinshaw (later known as Countess von Alberstrof), whom he met, and may have begun a relationship with, during the 1745 rebellion. She was suspected by many of Charles's supporters of being a spy planted by the Hanoverian government of Great Britain. On 29 October 1753, the couple had a daughter, Charlotte. Charles's inability to cope with the collapse of the Jacobite cause exacerbated his problem with alcohol, and mother and daughter separated from Charles with his father James's assistance. (Note: Charlotte went on to have illegitimate children with Ferdinand, an ecclesiastical member of the Rohan family. Their only son was Charles Edward Stuart, Count Roehenstart.)

In 1759, at the height of the Seven Years' War, Charles was summoned to a meeting in Paris with the French foreign minister, the Duc De Choiseul. Charles failed to make a good impression, being argumentative and idealistic in his expectations. Choiseul was planning a full-scale invasion of England involving upwards of 100,000 men, to which he hoped to add a number of Jacobites led by Charles. However, he was so little impressed with Charles that he dismissed the prospect of Jacobite assistance. The French invasion, which was Charles's last realistic chance to recover the thrones of England, Scotland and Ireland for the Stuart dynasty, was ultimately thwarted by naval defeats at Quiberon Bay and Lagos.

=== Pretender: 1766–1788 ===
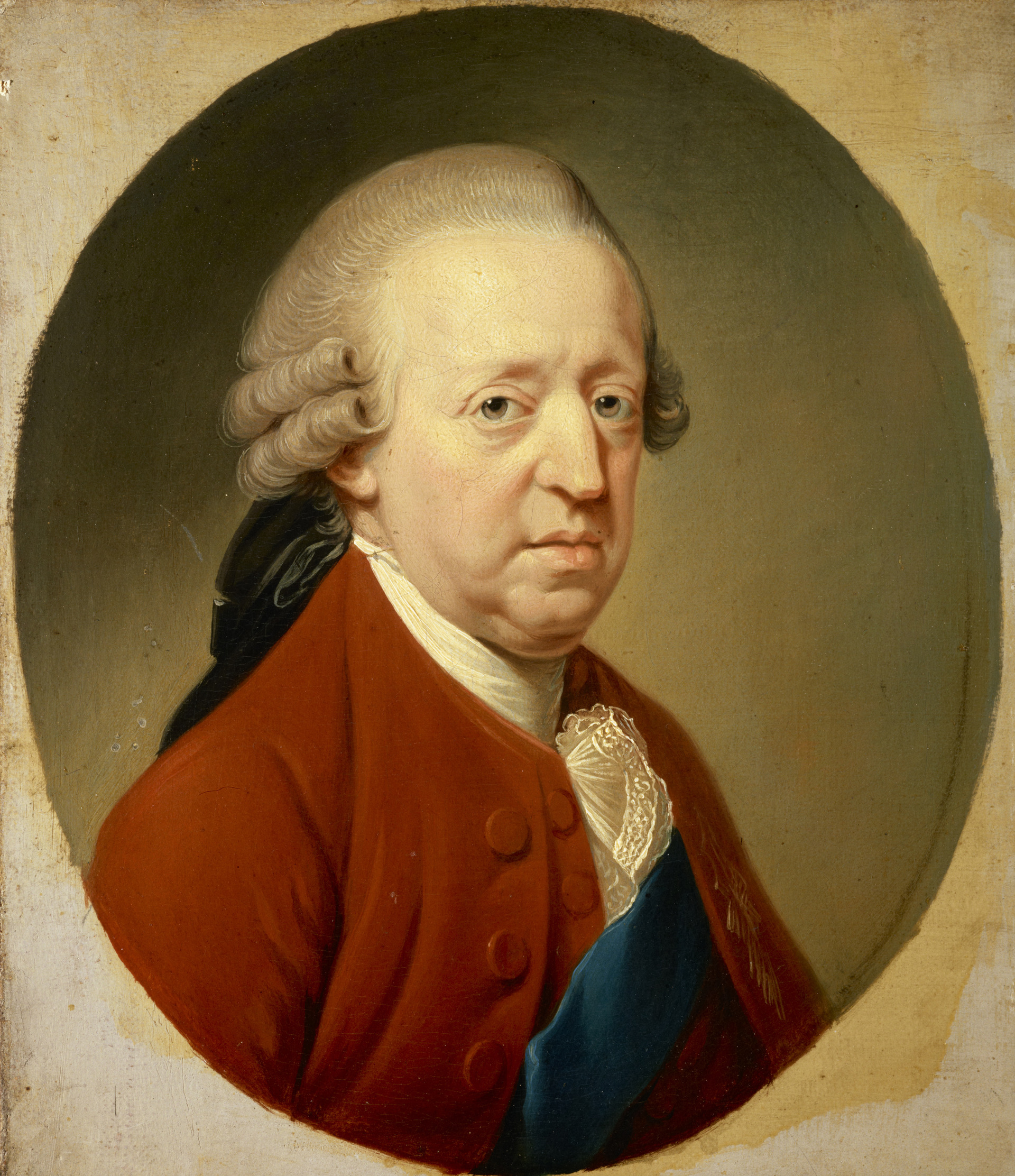
Charles Edward Stuart in his later years (painted by Hugh Douglas Hamilton, c. 1785)

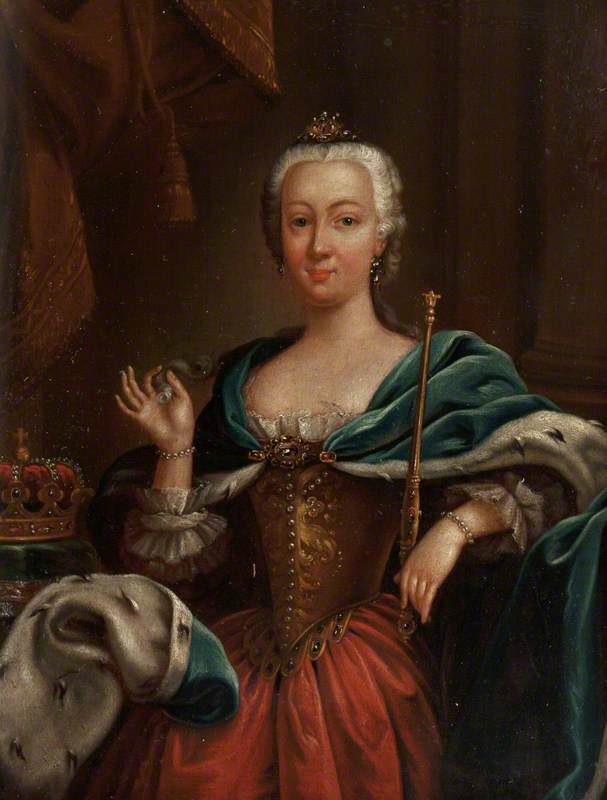
Princess Louise of Stolberg-Gedern (1752–1824), c. 1772

Charles's father died on 1 January 1766. Pope Clement XI had recognised James as King of England, Scotland, and Ireland as "James III and VIII", but over 40 years later Pope Clement XIII did not give Charles the same recognition as "Charles III", despite the efforts of Charles's brother, Henry. However, on 23 January, with the Pope's permission, Charles moved into the Palazzo Muti, which his father had lived in for over 40 years. Charles wrote to both the Kings of France and Spain on his accession, but recognition as King Charles III was not granted by either monarch. Charles returned to his social life in Rome, making visits to the Pope and indulging in pastimes such as hunting, shooting, balls, concerts, operas and plays. One notable occasion, was when he met and heard Wolfgang Amadeus Mozart perform at the Chigi Palace on 6 April. However, he would periodically shut himself away in his rooms, and was said to have formed no new friendships in his later life. He made visits to Florence and Pisa in 1770, where he took to the waters at the city's thermal baths. Charles returned to Paris in early 1771 with the permission of the French authorities under the Duc de Choiseul, who once again wished to discuss the possibility of a Jacobite invasion. However, on the day of the meeting, Charles was reported to be so intoxicated that he was unable to speak coherently, so the discussions were abandoned.

By the time Charles entered his 51st year, concern was raised by his Jacobite supporters and the French that he had not yet married, and that his brother, a priest sworn to celibacy, remained as the only male heir. The French also wished to continue the Stuart line as a potential weapon against the government in Britain. In 1771, while he was in Paris, Charles dispatched Sir Edmund Ryan, an Irish officer in Berwick's regiment, to seek out a bride for him. Despite some potential negotiations with prospective brides, he was unable to find a wife. A few months later, Charles's companion, the Duc d'Aiguillion, and his cousin Charles Fitz-James Stuart suggested the latter's sister-in-law Princess Louise of Stolberg-Gedern as a prospective bride. Accordingly, on 28 March 1772, Charles married Princess Louise by proxy. The couple met shortly after for the first time at Macerata on 17 April 1772, where the marriage was reported to have been consummated.

They lived first in Rome and then moved to Florence in 1774, where he was provided with a residence by Prince Corsini, the Palazzo di San Clemente, now known as the Palazzo del Pretendente. In Florence, he used the title "Count of Albany" as an alias, and his wife Louise was normally referred to as the "Countess of Albany". (Note: The title is frequently used for him in European publications) Charles's health deteriorated in later life, and he was reported to have suffered from asthma, high blood pressure, swollen legs and ulcers. In 1774, while in Florence, he suffered constantly from his illnesses, which required him to be carried by his servants to and from his carriage. Charles was also known to be an alcoholic, a condition that worsened with age.

Charles and Louise left Florence in 1777 and returned to Rome. Their relationship had become increasingly quarrelsome. One cause was said to be the speculation regarding Louise's adulterous relationships with the courtiers Carl Bonstetten and the Italian poet Count Vittorio Alfieri. Another cause was stated to be Charles himself, who was reported as becoming increasingly irrational and drunk. In November 1780, Louise formally left Charles. After separating, she claimed that Charles had physically abused her. This claim was generally believed by contemporaries. The historian Douglas states that Charles had been drinking following Saint Andrew's Day celebrations, and after accusing Louise of infidelities, may have attempted to rape her, resulting in her screaming to the extent that the household servants intervened. In the years that followed, the Pope awarded Louise half of Charles's papal pension, and Charles's international reputation was greatly damaged. He was said to live an increasingly isolated and unhappy life, especially after his brother Henry agreed to house Louise at his estate.

By 1783, Charles's health continued to decline, and for a time, he fell seriously ill such to the extent that he was given the Sacraments. Although Charles recovered, he agreed to create a new will, and signed an act of legitimation for his illegitimate daughter Charlotte. Charles also gave her the title "Duchess of Albany" in the peerage of Scotland and the style "Her Royal Highness", but these honours did not give Charlotte any right of succession to the throne. Charlotte lived with her father in Florence and Rome for the next five years. Eventually, she survived her father by less than two years, dying unmarried at Bologna in November 1789. (Note: John Hay Allen and Charles Manning Allen, later known as John Sobieski Stuart and Charles Edward Stuart, claimed, without any foundation, that their father, Thomas Allen, was a legitimate son of Charles and Louise.) In April 1784, Charles was persuaded by the visiting King Gustav III of Sweden to grant Louise a decree of separation, as well as giving Gustav himself his position as head of the Freemasons, which was rumoured to have been held by the Jacobite heirs. While not a formal divorce, as no such legal procedure existed in the Papal States, Louise was thereby legally permitted to live separately from her husband, even though she had been doing so for some time. Charles spent the majority of his last years living between Florence and Rome. However, he left Florence for the last time in 1785 and returned to Rome. It was reported that he was limited to light travelling by his doctors owing to his fragility.

== Death and burial ==
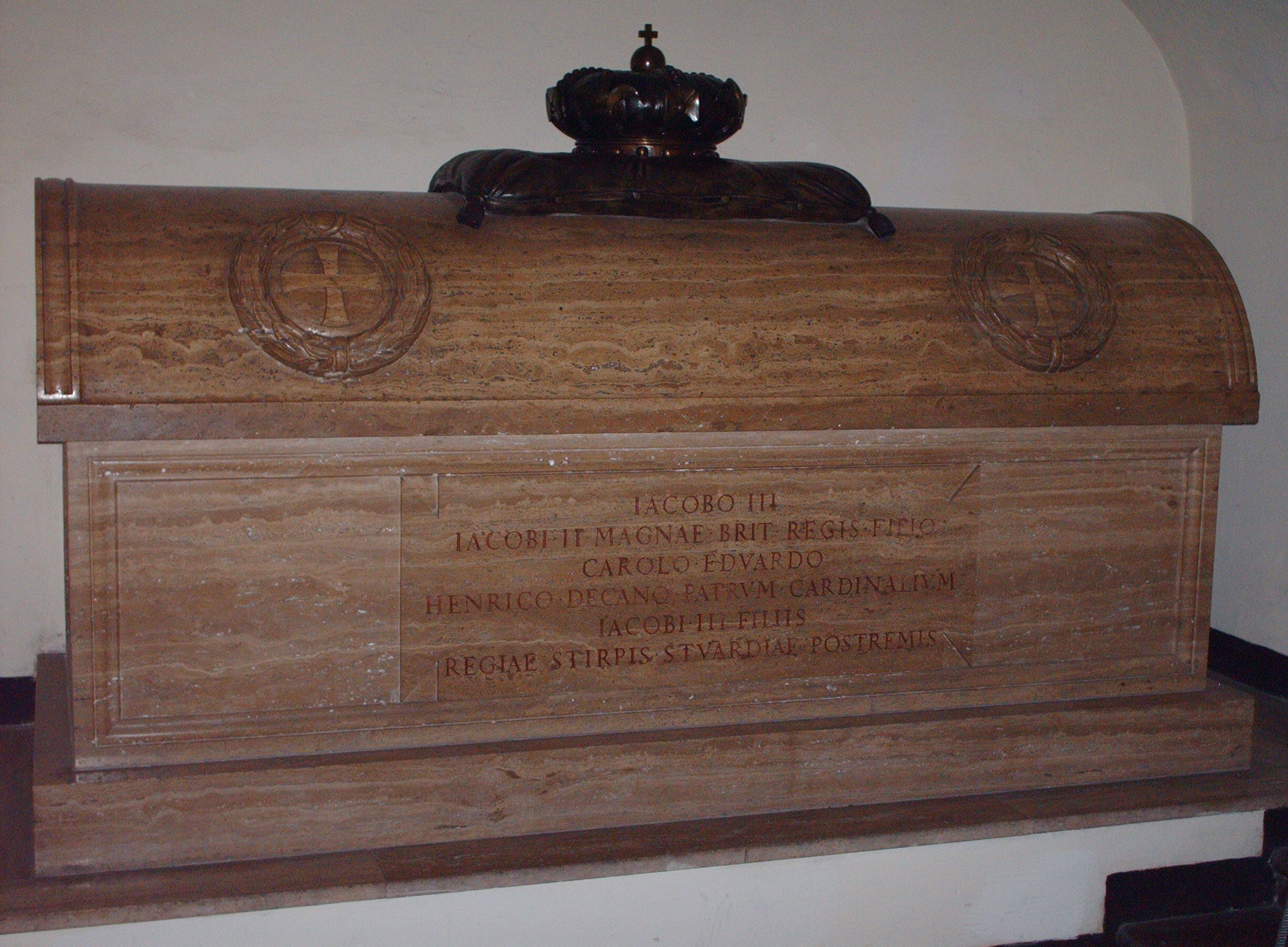
Tomb of Charles, his father and brother in St Peter's Basilica, Rome

Charles died in Rome of a stroke on 30 January 1788, aged 67. His brother the Cardinal Duke of York, who was present at the death, had the record read that he died on the morning of 31 January, as it was deemed unlucky to have him declared dead on the same date as the execution of his great-grandfather, King Charles I. Charles's will left most of his estate to his heir, his daughter Charlotte. There were a few exceptions, including some plates for his brother Henry, as well as some annuities for his servants.

On his death, a cast of his face was made, and his body was embalmed and placed in a coffin of cypress wood. Adorned with the Order of the Thistle, the Cross of St Andrew, the Order of the Garter and the Cross of St George, Charles was first buried in Frascati Cathedral near Rome, where his brother Henry was bishop. At Henry's death in 1807, Charles's remains (except his heart) were moved to the crypt of St Peter's Basilica in the Vatican, where they were laid to rest next to those of his brother and father. This was below the spot where the monument to the Royal Stuarts by Antonio Canova would later be erected. His mother Maria is also buried nearby at St Peter's. Charles's heart remained in Frascati Cathedral, where it is contained in a small urn beneath the floor, under a monument.

== Cultural depictions ==
Charles has been depicted in painting since the 18th century, much of it belonging to Romanticism and later Victorian representations of the Jacobites. Charles's departure from Scotland in 1746 is depicted in an engraving of a painting by Francis William Topham, Prince Charles Edward, bidding adieu to his friends. (Note: published in Fisher's Drawing Room Scrap Book, 1839, with a poetical illustration by Letitia Elizabeth Landon.) In 1892, John Pettie painted Charles entering the Ballroom at Holyroodhouse. Charles and the Jacobites would also be depicted in numerous drawings, prints and on objects, his likeness and coat of arms even depicted on objects such as engraved drinking glasses.

Charles has been depicted on stage as well as in film and television. He was portrayed by David Niven in the 1948 semi-biographical film Bonnie Prince Charlie. Charles was also portrayed by Andrew Gower in the historical dramatic series Outlander, based upon Diana Gabaldon's book series. His life has formed a component of numerous historical plays, including For Bonnie Prince Charlie (1897), the Young Pretender (1996) and The Glory (2000).

The legacy of Charles Stuart and his role in Jacobitism has also influenced songs and music. Examples include the folk songs "Óró sé do bheatha abhaile", "Bonnie Charlie", "Wha'll be King but Charlie?" and "Charlie is my darling". Charles's subsequent flight from Scotland is commemorated in "The Skye Boat Song" by the English author Sir Harold Edwin Boulton and in the Irish song "Mo Ghile Mear" by Seán Clárach Mac Domhnaill. The popular song My Bonnie Lies over the Ocean could be in reference to him as a way to refer to him but also to any woman. It was covered by Tony Sheridan and the Beatles in 1961.

== Arms ==
Arms used by Charles as Prince of Wales

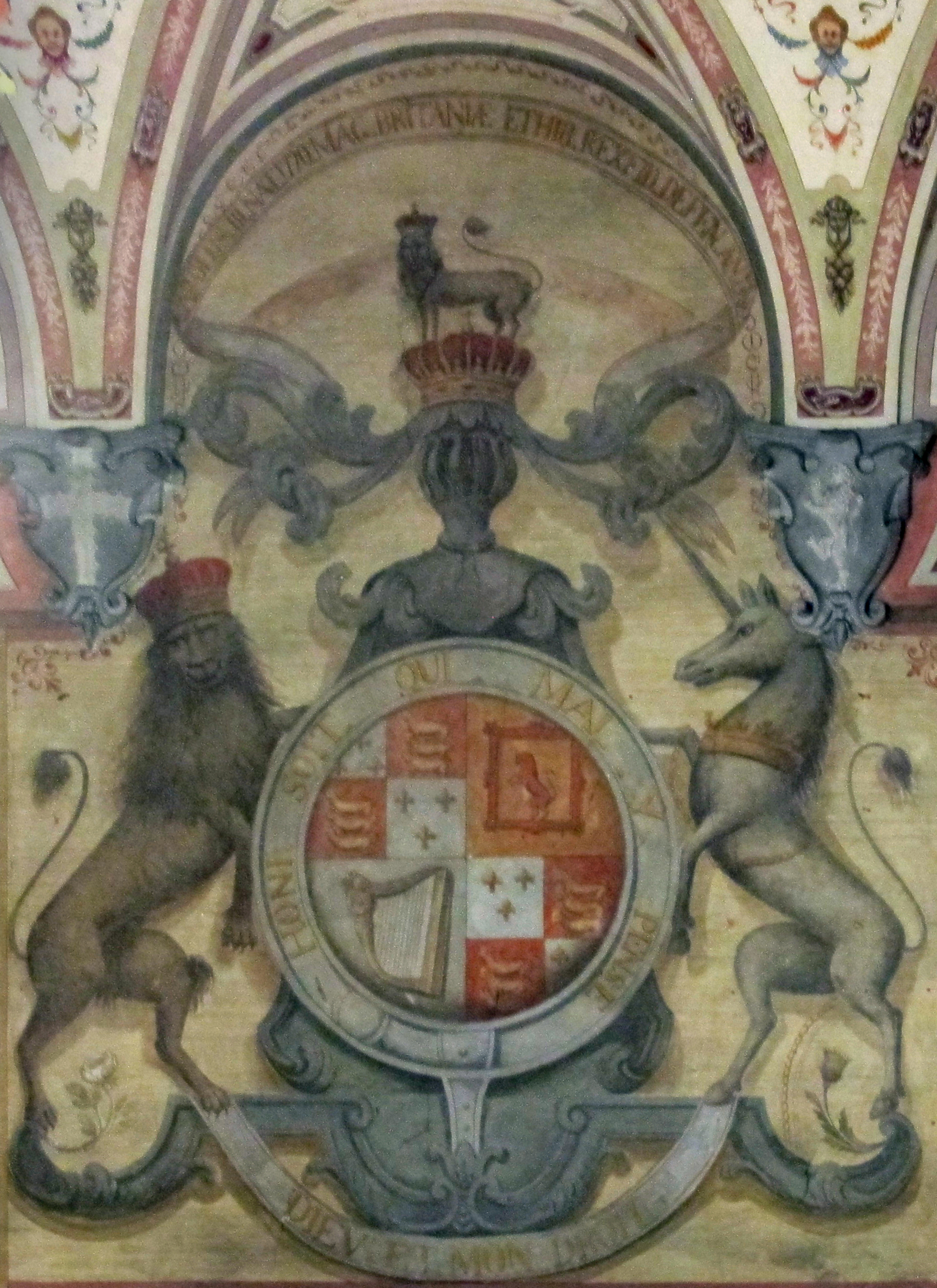
Coat of arms of The Young Pretender (Royal Arms of England) in the Palazzo di San Clemente in Florence

During his pretence as Prince of Wales, Charles claimed a coat of arms consisting of those of the kingdom, differenced by a label argent of three points.

== Ancestry ==
Ancestors of Charles Edward Stuart

8. Charles I of England
4. James II of England
9. Henrietta Maria of France
2. James Francis Edward Stuart
10. Alfonso IV d'Este, Duke of Modena
5. Mary of Modena
11. Laura Martinozzi
1. Charles Edward Stuart
12. John III Sobieski
6. Jakub Ludwik Sobieski
13. Marie Casimire Louise de la Grange d'Arquien
3. Maria Klementyna Sobieska
14. Philip William, Elector Palatine
7. Hedwig Elisabeth of Neuburg
15. Elisabeth Amalie of Hesse-Darmstadt

== Sources ==
- Aronson, Theo (1979). Kings over the water: the saga of the Stuart pretenders. London: Cassell. ISBN 978-0304303243.
- Bongie, Laurence (1986). The Love of a Prince – Bonnie Prince Charlie in France, 1744–1748. Vancouver: University of British Columbia Press. ISBN 978-0774802581.
- This article incorporates text from a publication now in the public domain: Chisholm, Hugh, ed. (1911). "Cawdor". Encyclopædia Britannica. Vol. 5 (11th ed.). Cambridge University Press. p. 587.
- Coltman, Viccy (2019). Art and Identity in Scotland. A Cultural History from the Jacobite Rising of 1745 to Walter Scott. Cambridge: Cambridge University Press. ISBN 9781108278133.
- Douglas, Hugh (1975). Charles Edward Stuart. London: Hale. ISBN 978-0709148159.
- Elcho, David Wemyss (1907). A Short account of the affairs of Scotland in the years 1744, 1745, 1746 by David, Lord Elcho printed from the original manuscript at Gasford with a memoir and annotations by the Hon. Evan Charteris. Edinburgh: Published by David Douglas. OCLC 1033725714.
- Kaiser, Thomas (1997). "The Drama of Charles Edward Stuart, Jacobite Propaganda, and French Political Protest, 1745–1750". Eighteenth-Century Studies. 30 (4): 365–381. doi:10.1353/ecs.1997.0035. JSTOR 30053865. S2CID 155039620.
- Johnston, Arran (2010). Valour does not wait. The rise and fall of Charles Edward Stuart. Prestonpans: Prestoungrange University Press. ISBN 978-0850111248.
- Kybett, Susan M. (1988). Bonnie Prince Charlie: A Biography of Charles Edward Stuart. London: Unwin Hyman. ISBN 978-0044403876.
- McLynn, Frank (2005). 1759: The Year Britain Became Master of the World. London: Pimlico. ISBN 978-0099526391.
- McLynn, Frank (1988). Charles Edward Stuart: A Tragedy in Many Acts. London: Routledge. ISBN 979-8646825446.
- McLynn, Frank (1985). The Jacobites. London: Routledge & Kegan Paul. ISBN 978-0710201652.
- McLynn, Frank (1998). The Jacobite Army in England, 1745. Edinburgh: John Donald. ISBN 978-0-85976-488-9.
- This article incorporates text from a publication now in the public domain: Vaughan, Herbert Millingchamp (1911). "Charles Edward". In Chisholm, Hugh (ed.). Encyclopædia Britannica. Vol. 5 (11th ed.). Cambridge University Press. pp. 940–942.
- Norie, William (1907). The Life and Adventures of Prince Charles Edward Stuart. Caxton.
- Pininski, Peter (2010). Bonnie Prince Charlie. A Life. Amberley. ISBN 978-1-84868-194-1.
- Preston, Diana (1995). The Road to Culloden Moor. Bonnie Prince Charlie and the 45' Rebellion. Constable. ISBN 978-0094761704.
- Riding, Jacqueline (2016). Jacobites: A New History of the 45 Rebellion. Bloomsbury. ISBN 978-1408819128.
- Silverman, Jerry (2010). Songs of Scotland. Melbay Publications. ISBN 978-1609749316.
- Stewart, James A. Jr. (2001). "Highland Motives in the Jacobite Rising of 1745–46: 'Forcing Out,' Traditional Documentation and Gaelic Poetry". Proceedings of the Harvard Celtic Colloquium. 20/21: 141–173. ISBN 978-0674023833. JSTOR 41219594.

Charles Edward Stuart House of Stuart Born: 31 December 1720 Died: 31 January 1788
Titles in pretence
| Preceded by James Francis Edward Stuart as James III and VIII | — TITULAR — King of England, Scotland, France and Ireland; Jacobite succession 1766–1788; Reason for succession failure: Grandfather deposed in 1688 | Succeeded by Henry Benedict Stuart as Henry IX and I |
