= Udny Green =

Village in Aberdeenshire, Scotland

Coordinates: 57°19′41″N 2°12′0″W

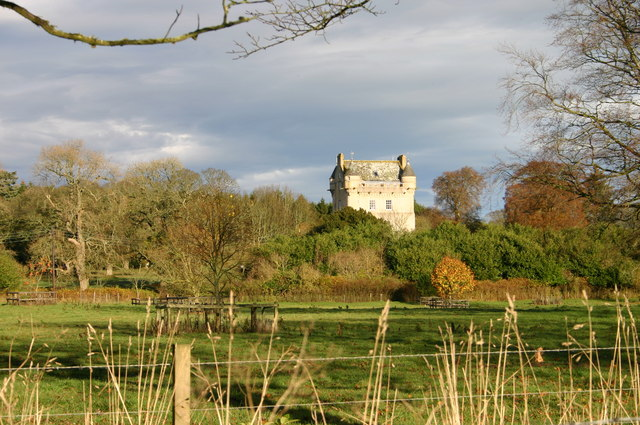
Udny Castle, near Udny Green

Udny Green (Scottish Gaelic: Olldanaidh; Doric: Widnie Green) is a village in Aberdeenshire, Scotland, located immediately south-west of Pitmedden. It forms part of the parish of Udny, along with the nearby settlement of Udny Station.

== History ==
Considered the last family jester of Scotland, Jamie Fleeman or Fleming (1713–1778) about 1734 was employed by the Laird of Udny. There were a number of annedotes printed about Fleeman, and in 1859, John B. Pratt published a set of stories that may have been related to Fleeman: The life and death of Jamie Fleeman, the Laird of Udny's fool.

On 22 September 1943, the Royal Engineers were called out to Udny Castle to investigate reports of an unexploded bomb. It was subsequently identified as a "flash bomb" used by the Luftwaffe at night to illuminate areas for navigation or photographic purposes.

== Village ==
The now-deconsecrated Udny Parish Church stands beside the village green, with the old kirkyard and Udny Mort House on the opposite side.

== Notable persons ==
- James Anderson of Hermiston (1739–1808), agriculturist, journalist, and economist. Managed lands of the Udny family.
- Mary Garson (1921–2007), psychologist and later nun. Born in the village.
- James Melvin (1795–1853), scholar of Latin. Briefly taught at private school in area.
- James Outram (1803–1863), army officer who served in the Indian Rebellion of 1857. Schooled in Udny.

== See also ==
- Clan Udny
- Formartine community area
