= Bonnie Prince Charlie Entering the Ballroom at Holyroodhouse =

Painting by John Pettie

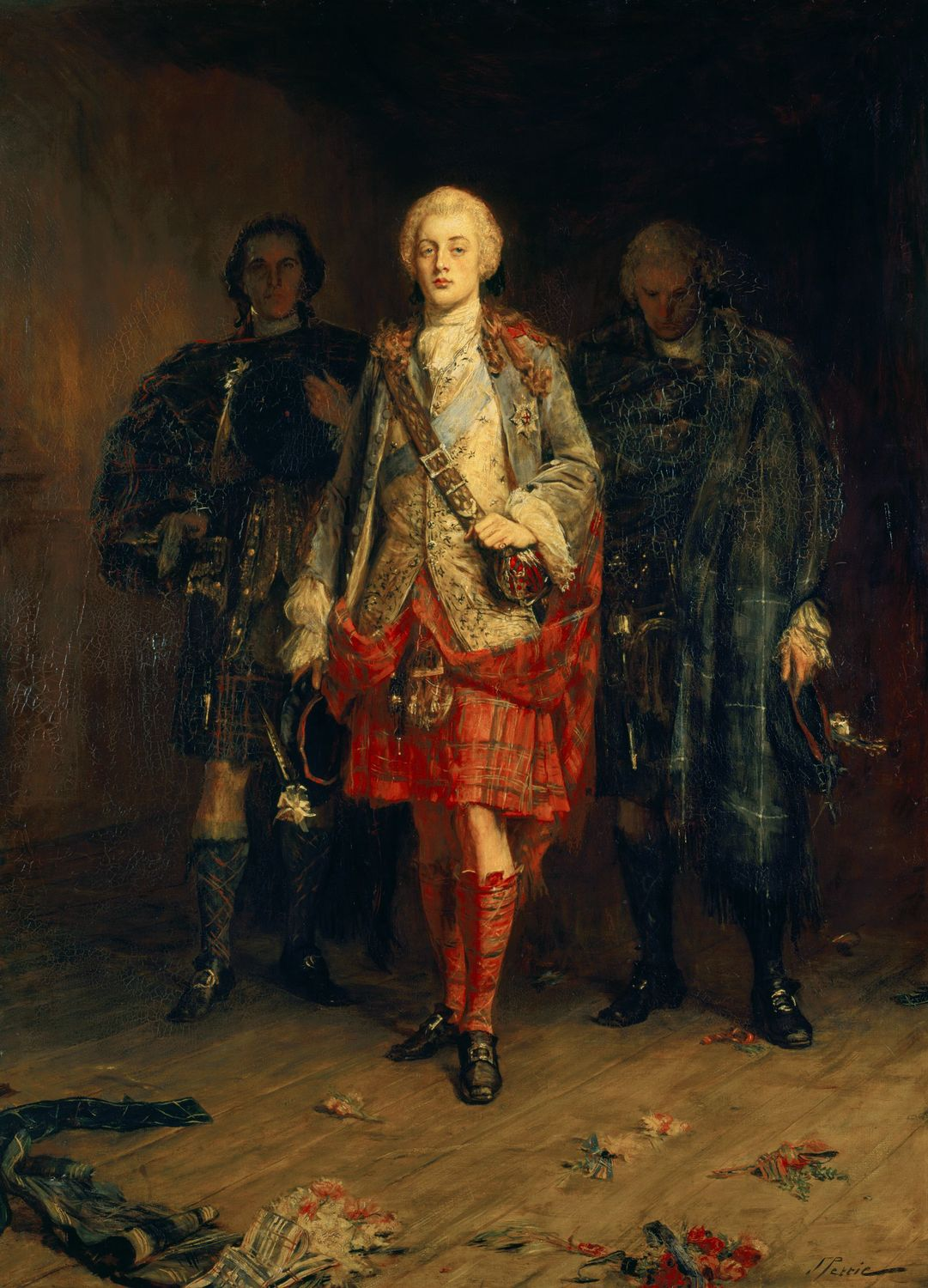
- Artist: John Pettie
- Year: 1892
- Type: Oil on canvas, history painting
- Dimensions: 158.8 cm × 114.3 cm (62.5 in × 45.0 in)
- Location: Holyroodhouse, Edinburgh

Bonnie Prince Charlie Entering the Ballroom at Holyroodhouse is an 1892 history painting by the British artist John Pettie. It depicts an event during the Jacobite Rising of 1745 when Charles Edward Stuart arrives at a ball held at the old royal palace Holyroodhouse.

Like many of Pettie's historical pictures, it is an embellished scene based on real events. Edinburgh fell to the Jacobites in September 1745 and Charles, the eldest son of the Jacobite claimant to the throne James, held court there; however, Pettie's depiction of the fictional ball is based on the 1814 novel Waverley by Walter Scott.

There was no-full length portrait of Charles, known to history as Bonnie Prince Charlie, to base the work on. Instead Pettie got his son-in-law the composer Hamish MacCunn to pose for the painting. Charles is shown on the cusp of the room arriving from darkness into the light and flanked by his loyal followers Donald Cameron of Lochiel and Lord Forbes. It was one of Pettie's final works and was displayed at the Royal Academy's Summer Exhibition of 1892 at Burlington House. In 1916 it was presented by its then owner to George V. It remains in the Royal Collection today.

== Bibliography ==
- Clarke, Deborah & Remington, Vanessa. Scottish Artists 1750-1900: From Caledonia to the Continent. Royal Collection Trust, 2015.
- Nicholson, Robin. Bonnie Prince Charlie and the Making of a Myth: A Study in Portraiture, 1720-1892. Bucknell University Press, 2002.
