= Palazzo di San Clemente =

Building in Florence, Italy

Coordinates: 43°46′43.42″N 11°15′48.48″E

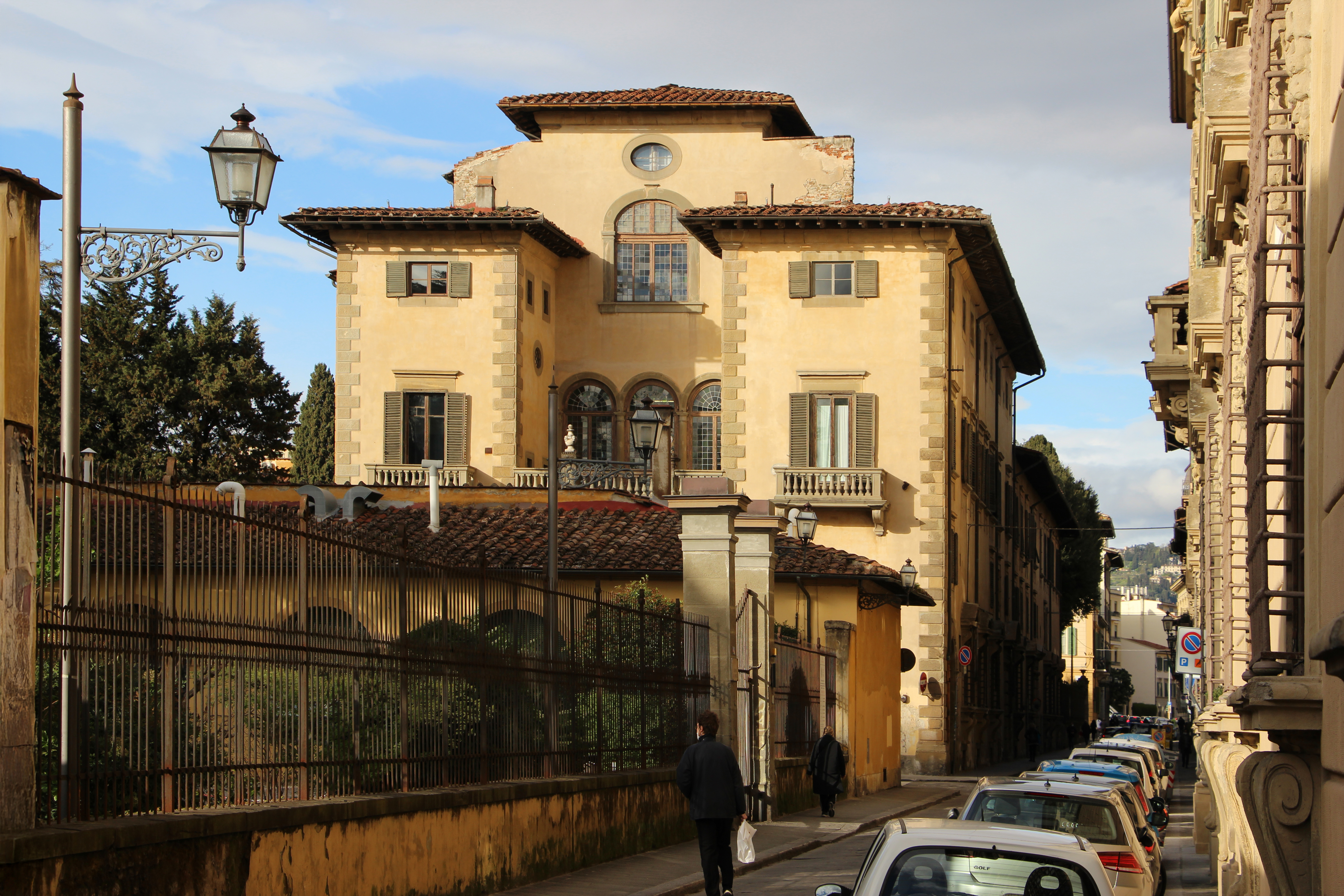
Palazzo di San Clemente.

Palazzo di San Clemente (also called Palazzo del Pretendente) is a residential palace in Florence, Italy.

== History ==
Along the current Via Capponi there was a small building visible in the plan of the city from 1584, which was acquired and enlarged by Luigi di Toledo, brother of Grand Duchess Eleanor of Toledo. Late Renaissance art biographer Giorgio Vasari speaks about it in the Life of Jacopo Sansovino.

In 1634 the Guadagni family bought it, entrusting architect Gherardo Silvani with the renovation of the palace and the garden (1644). The edifice was thus transformed into a suburban villa, of the type then known as a Casino. The family owned it until 1777, when they sold it to Bonnie Prince Charlie, who then used the alias of count of Albany; since the latter was the legitimist pretender to the thrones of England, Scotland, Ireland and France, the palace is also called Palazzo del Pretendente. Later it went to Simone Velluti Zati, duke of San Clemente, hence the current name. Russian prince Nikolai Demidov was his guest here in 1882.

The edifice is a seat of the Faculty of Architecture of the University of Florence.

== Sources ==
- Vannucci, Marcello (1995). Splendidi palazzi di Firenze. Florence: Le Lettere.
