= James Melvin =

Scottish scholar of Latin (1795–1853)

James Melvin (1795–1853) was a 19th-century Scottish scholar of Latin. He gathered a huge library and was the foremost Latin scholar of his day in Scotland.

== Life ==
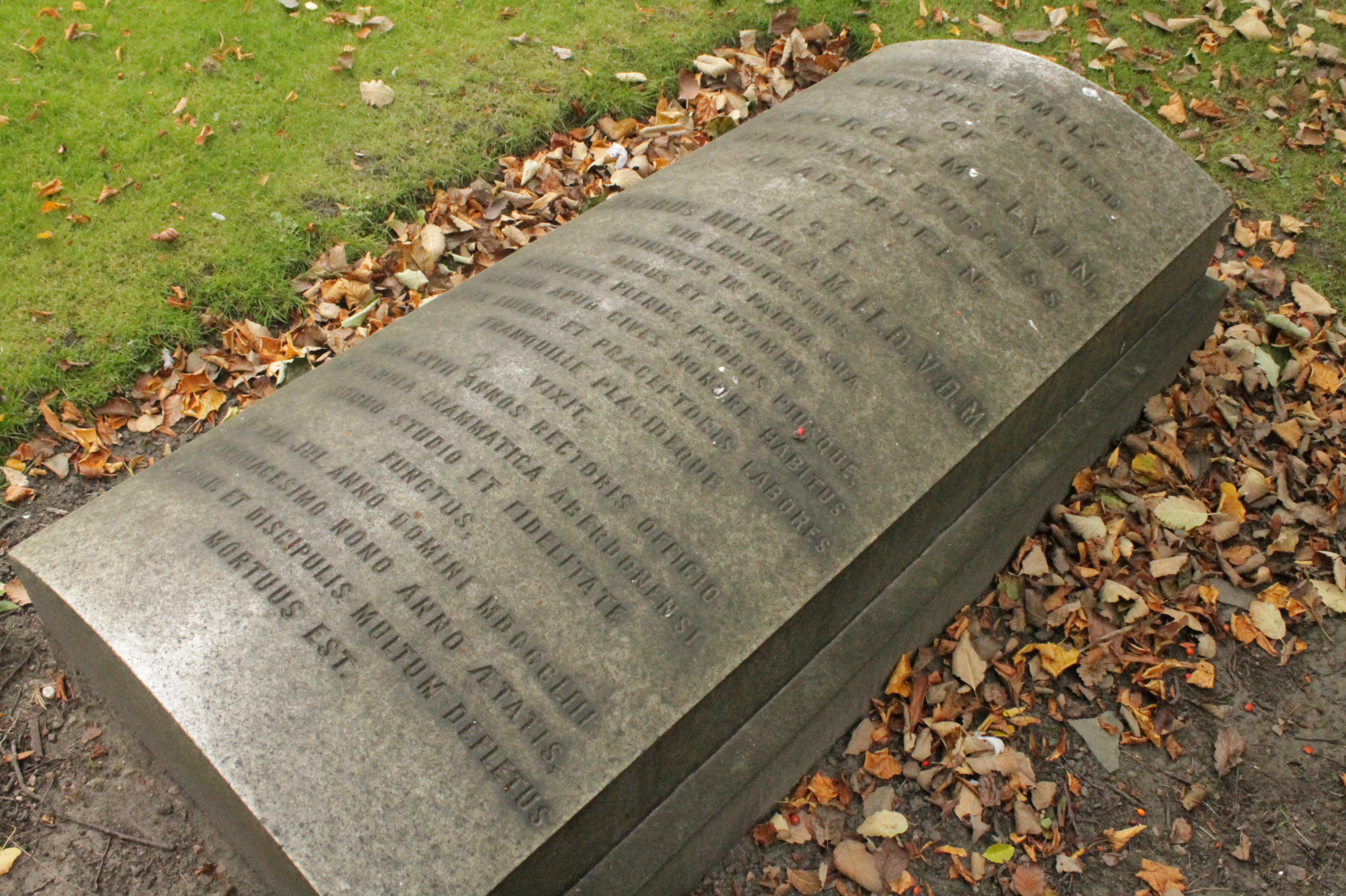
The grave of James Melvin, churchyard of the Kirk of St Nicholas in Aberdeen

He was born on 21 April 1795 in Aberdeen to poor parents. He was educated at Aberdeen Grammar School under the rectorship of Cromar. He won a bursary to Marischal College, University of Aberdeen, and graduated MA in 1816.

He worked as a Latin tutor at a private school owned by Mr Bisset at Udny, then at Old Aberdeen Grammar School under Ewen Maclachlan. In 1822 he became Classics master at Aberdeen Grammar School and in 1826 succeeded Cromar as Rector. He also lectured on Humanity at Marischal College, which awarded him an honorary doctorate (LLD) in 1834. His pupils included David Masson who later compared Melvin to the inspirational Thomas Arnold. Despite this he twice failed in his candidacy for Professor of Latin in Marischal College, in 1839 and again in 1852.

He died at home at 41 Belmont Street in Aberdeen on 29 June 1853. He was buried in the churchyard of the Kirk of St Nicholas on Union Street on 5 July. The curved granite slab on his grave is in Latin so gives his name as Jacobus Melvin.

Following his death he was succeeded as Rector of Aberdeen Grammar School by Sir William Duguid Geddes. In 1856 his sister, Agnes Melvin, donated slightly under 7000 Latin books to Marischal College, having no use for the books.

== Publications ==
- A Latin Grammar (1822)

== Memorials ==
A stained glass window in the library of Marischal College is dedicated to his memory in 1885. It was designed by J Hardman Powell.

== Artistic recognition ==
He was portrayed by James Cassie around 1850.

== Family ==
He never married and lived with his mother and sister at Belmont Street near the Grammar School (on School Hill). They had a Newfoundland (dog) named Caesar.
