= Garson (surname) =

Garson is a surname. Notable people with the surname include:

- Gerald Garson (1932–2016), American lawyer, former New York Supreme Court Justice and convicted felon
- Greer Garson (1904–1996), British actress, won the Best Actress Oscar for Mrs. Miniver (1942)
- Margaret Garson (1927–2020), Australian physician and cytogenetics researcher
- Mary Garson, Australian biochemist and academic
- Mary Garson (nun) (1921–2007), Scottish nun
- Mike Garson (born 1945), American jazz pianist
- Mort Garson (1924–2008), Canadian-born composer and arranger, electronic music pioneer
- Scott Garson (born 1976), American college basketball coach
- Stuart Garson (1898–1977), Canadian politician, former Premier of Manitoba and federal cabinet minister
- William Garson (1856–1911), Scottish-born Ontario and Manitoba businessman and political figure
- Willie Garson (1964–2021), American character actor
