= Jamie Fleeman =

Scottish family jester of the 18th century

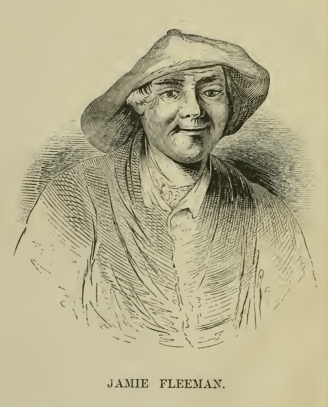
Jamie Fleeman, the Laird of Udny's Fool, one of the last family jesters in Scotland.

Jamie Fleeman or Fleeming (1713–1778) was better known as "the Laird of Udny's Fool" or "the Laird of Udny's Fule" in the Scots language. Although described as a fool, he had a reputation for his clever, witty repartee and many anecdotal tales of his actions are re-capped. He was specifically mentioned in the 1845 Statistical Accounts of Scotland and characterised in novels. Fleeman is associated with the Countess of Erroll and was used by her to carry messages to Jacobite rebels. He was probably the last family jester in Scotland.

== Early life ==
Fleeman was born in Longside, Aberdeenshire, in 1713 and was one of three children. His precise date of birth is not given but he is recorded as being baptised on 7 April 1713. Few details are known about his father except he was a crofter who was also named James Fleming. There is also scant information about his mother other than that she drowned in a deep pool beside the Bridge of Ludquharn. The pool became known as "Fleeman's Pot". Fleeman's sister, Martha, was a Presbyterian and often conversed by quoting Psalms and had the reputation of being demented. Fleeman's brother is believed to have died aboard HMS Serapis.

Fleeman is described as having a large round head with dull hair that stood on end giving the impression he had been "scared out of his wits", broad shouldered and possessing formidable strength. He often went barefoot and wore basic clothing of sack-cloth or serge material.

The home of Sir Alexander Guthrie near Ludquharn was where Fleeman spent his childhood days but he was already being favoured by other local gentry for his ready wit and amusing remarks. Most of his life was then predominantly spent as a part of the Laird of Udny's household although Fleeman still roamed wherever he chose.

== Career ==
Fleeman was employed by the Laird of Udny and was dependent on him. His primary function was to provide amusement to the family but he also worked as a farm labourer tending cows and geese. Although Fleeman has been described as a fool or a family jester, he was listed as a pauper in the statistical accounts. He is specifically mentioned by Reverend John Imray of Longside Parish under Section II, eminent characters of the New Statistical Account of Scotland 1845, where it states:

No offence is meant by introducing here the name of an individual who had a county (if not a national) reputation, and whose printed memorabilia have gone through several editions. This was Jamie Fleeman (or Fleeming), "the Laird of Udny's fool," who flourished here about the middle of last century. His name appears frequently in the session's list of paupers and his sayings and doings have been a theme of wonderment to a generation or two.

In 1734 Fleeman was with the Laird of Udny and his family at Knockhall Castle. The castle was destroyed by fire and Fleeman is credited with saving the lives of the family. He was said to have been woken by a dog who was his companion and after discovering the fire, first woke his friends before throwing a large oak chest through a window; normally the weight of the chest meant it needed three men to lift it. Initially Fleeman did not attempt to rouse anyone he disliked, including a bad-tempered domestic servant who he felt generally treated him badly. It was only after he was begged by other staff that he went back into the castle and woke the woman. The family returned to living at Udny Castle after the fire.

Fleeman is described as a "protector and confidante" of the Countess of Erroll who was a fervent Jacobite supporter. He was able to move around the area without being questioned or suspected of any illicit activity and she used him to deliver messages when she was mustering support for the Jacobite rebellion. She also used him to convey messages to Lord Pitsligo when he was in hiding at Auchiries.

His notoriety extended to Fleeman's name being included in one of Bram Stoker's Dracula stories. In the 1914 collection of works entitled Dracula's Guest and Other Weird Stories, first published after Stoker's death, in the tale called Crooken Sands, Mr Markham has asked his companion if he saw someone else dressed in the same manner as his own. The reply given was that there had not been any such fool since the time of Jamie Fleeman, the Laird of Udny's Fool. The fictional character of Davie Gellatley who appears in the 1814 novel Waverley by Sir Walter Scott is thought to be based on Fleeman. Gellatley is characterised as an 'innocent' and a 'fool'.

Some of Fleeman's remarks and actions were also recapped in a newspaper article in a significant weekly publication in New Zealand in 1889.

Fleeman is attributed as the last of the "family jesters in Scotland" and is better known than the laird who employed him.

== Anecdotes ==
Several of Fleeman's anecdotes are published.

One frequently quoted is the tale of Fleeman approaching a minister with a horse shoe he had found on the road. He asked the minister what it was and received the reply "Why Jamie, any fool would know that it is a horse shoe"; Fleeman's response was "Ah, what it is to be wise – to ken it's no a meer's shoe."

On another occasion a rather droll but superior gent condescendingly asked Fleeman "Whose fool are you?" and Fleeman answered "I'm Udny's feel. Wha's feel are ye?" (Note: The meanings of some of the less common words are: beast – cow, horse, sheep or ox; dinna – do not; feel or fule – fool; ken – know; meer's – mare's;)

Enough to make the newspapers in Australia by February 1849 was recalled as one alleged Sunday event was when the minister upon entering the Udny Parish Church saw a "Jamie Fleming" in the pulpit, and called upon Jamie to come down. The response:

Come ye up, sir, they're a stiff-neckit and rebellious generation, sir, an' it will tack us baith to manage them.

John B. Pratt published in 1859 a set of stories that may have related to Fleeman: The life and death of Jamie Fleeman, the Laird of Udny's fool.

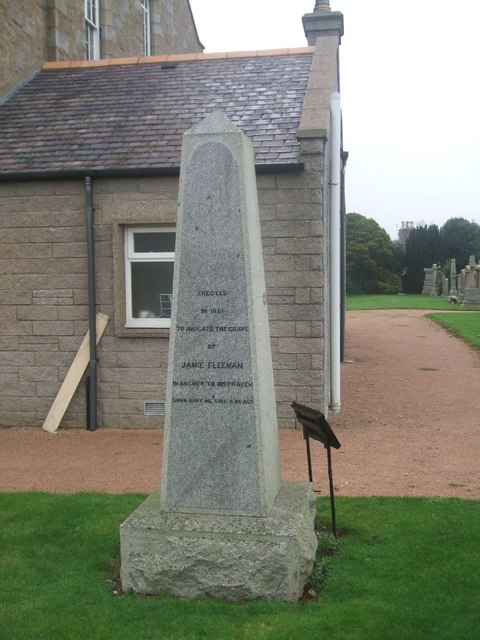
Jamie Fleeman's grave, Longside

== Death ==
During a summer evening of 1778, Fleeman became soaked in a heavy rain storm. He quickly developed a fever, which then turned to jaundice. He received no offers of help and spent time wandering between different houses but no one was willing to give him shelter. Fleeman's weakened state caused him to rapidly become emaciated and lose his strength. He eventually found shelter in a barn at Little Ardiffery, in the parish of Cruden. He secured the barn door with a piece of planking and fell asleep. A short while later, some farm labourers, unaware Fleeman was sleeping behind the door, forced it open causing the plank to strike Fleeman's head. The severity of his injury was not discovered until some hours later; he was then taken to the kitchen and his wound attended to. Fleeman insisted he wanted to return to Longside, some eight miles distant. He took a whole day to walk back to his sister's cottage in Kinmundy. Two days later, Fleeman died. Two versions of his last words are given; they were either: "I'm of a gentle persuasion, dinna bury me like a beast" or "I'm a Christian, dinna bury me like a beast."

Fleeman's grave is at Longside and a monument to mark his grave was erected in 1861.
