= Clan Udny =

Scottish clan

- Motto: All my hope is in God

Profile
- District: Aberdeenshire
- Clan Udny no longer has a chief, and is an armigerous clan
- Historic seat: Udny Castle or Knockhall Castle
- Last Chief: The Udny of Udny

Clan Udny is a Scottish armigerous clan from Aberdeenshire, Scotland.

Arms for Udny of the Ilk have been recorded on three occasions in the Lyon Register; 1672–7, 1748–51 and 1789.

The family Udny of Udny possessed the barony of Udny in Aberdeenshire for several generations prior to 1875. Udny Castle was probably initially constructed by the Udny family in the 14th or 15th century.

The name has been spelled sometimes as Widney and Uldney. Scottish folk singer Jock Duncan said about the pronunciation of Udny, when commenting on his song about the Aberdeenshire town of Udny on his CD Ye Shine Whar Ye Stan!: "I’ve heard many versions o it – an tunes an aa, fen I wis young. Widney wis the pronunciation. Never naebody heard o Udny: 'It’s Widney boy – are ye gaun doun tae Widney the nicht?’"

== Members ==
Ordered by date of birth.

- Robert Fullarton Udny (1725–1802), merchant, art collector and Fellow of the Royal Society. Brother of John.
- John Udny (1727–1800), diplomat who served as British Consul at Venice and Livorno. Brother of Robert.

== See also ==
- Udny Green village
- Udny Station village
