= Knockhall Castle =

Castle in Aberdeenshire, Scotland

- near Newburgh, Aberdeenshire in Scotland
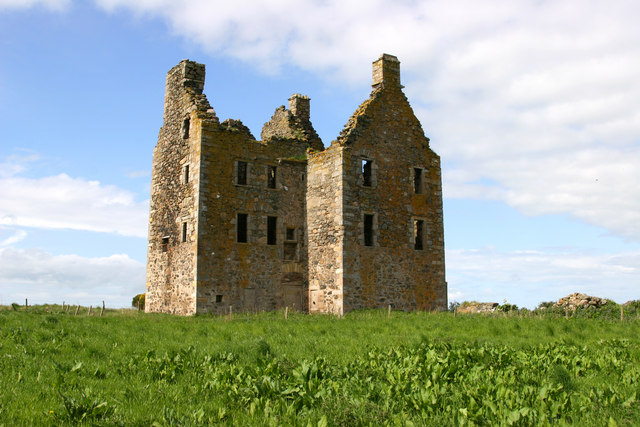
- Knockhall Castle in 2006

Site information
- Condition: Ruined

Location
- Coordinates: 57.3288°N 2.0123°W

Site history
- Built: 16th century
- Built by: William Sinclair

Scheduled monument
- Official name: Knockhall Castle
- Type: Secular: castle; manor house
- Designated: 11 February 1993
- Reference no.: SM5577

Knockhall Castle is a 16th-century ruined Scottish castle near Newburgh, Aberdeenshire. Built by William Sinclair, 5th Lord Sinclair, it is designated a scheduled monument.

== History ==
The castle was built by William Sinclair, 5th Lord Sinclair of Newburgh and completed sometime in 1565. James VI stayed on 9 July 1589. There is a stone door lintel carved with the date '1589’ in commemoration of the royal visit. John Sinclair, 10th Lord Sinclair sold the castle to Clan Udny in 1634. The building was damaged in 1639 when taken by the Earl Marischal for the Covenanters, but was later returned to Udny hands. The Clan occupied the castle until 1734, when an accidental fire caused extensive damage to the building. The Clan then moved back into their other property, Udny Castle. Jamie Fleeman, the Laird of Udny's fool, is credited with saving the life of the family in the fire.

== Architecture ==
Knockhall Castle is an L-plan tower house of three storeys with an attic. The ground floor was vaulted and contained service rooms, while the Great Hall occupied the first floor. In the 17th century the castle was altered, including the addition of a projecting tower and the enlargement of windows.

== Later history ==
Reports in late 2019 indicated that the castle was for sale but redevelopment would require planning permission.
