= Garzón =

Garzón may refer to:

Geographic places:

- Garzón (Colombia), a town and municipality in the Huila Department, Colombia
- Roman Catholic Diocese of Garzón, Colombia
- Garzón, Uruguay, a village in Maldonado department
  - Arroyo Garzón and Laguna Garzón, a stream and a lagoon in the same area
  - Laguna Garzón Bridge, a circular bridge in that area

People:

- Alberto Garzón, Spanish economist and former party leader of Izquierda Unida
- Baltasar Garzón, Spanish judge
- Jaime Garzón, Colombian journalist, comedian, and political satirist
- Gustavo Garzón, Argentine film and television actor
- Luis Eduardo Garzón, former mayor of Bogotá, Colombia
- Nelly Garzón Alarcón (1932-2019), Colombian nurse, teacher

== See also ==
- Garçon (disambiguation)
- Garson (disambiguation)
