= Udny Castle =

Tower house in Udny, Aberdeenshire, Scotland

Coordinates: 57.331481°N 2.197298°W

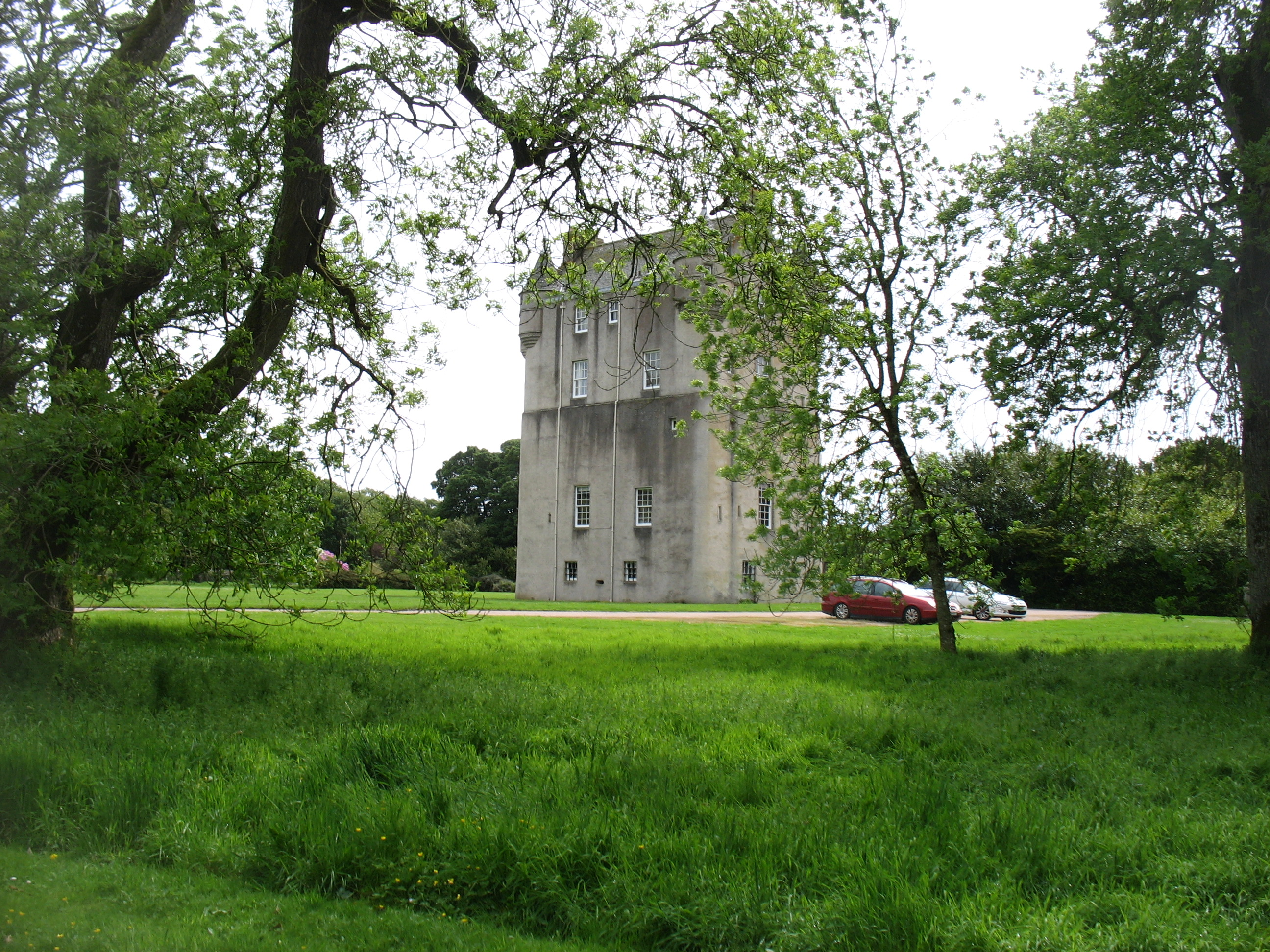
- The castle in 2019
- Interactive map of Udny Castle

Listed Building – Category A
- Designated: April 1971
- Reference no.: LB15922

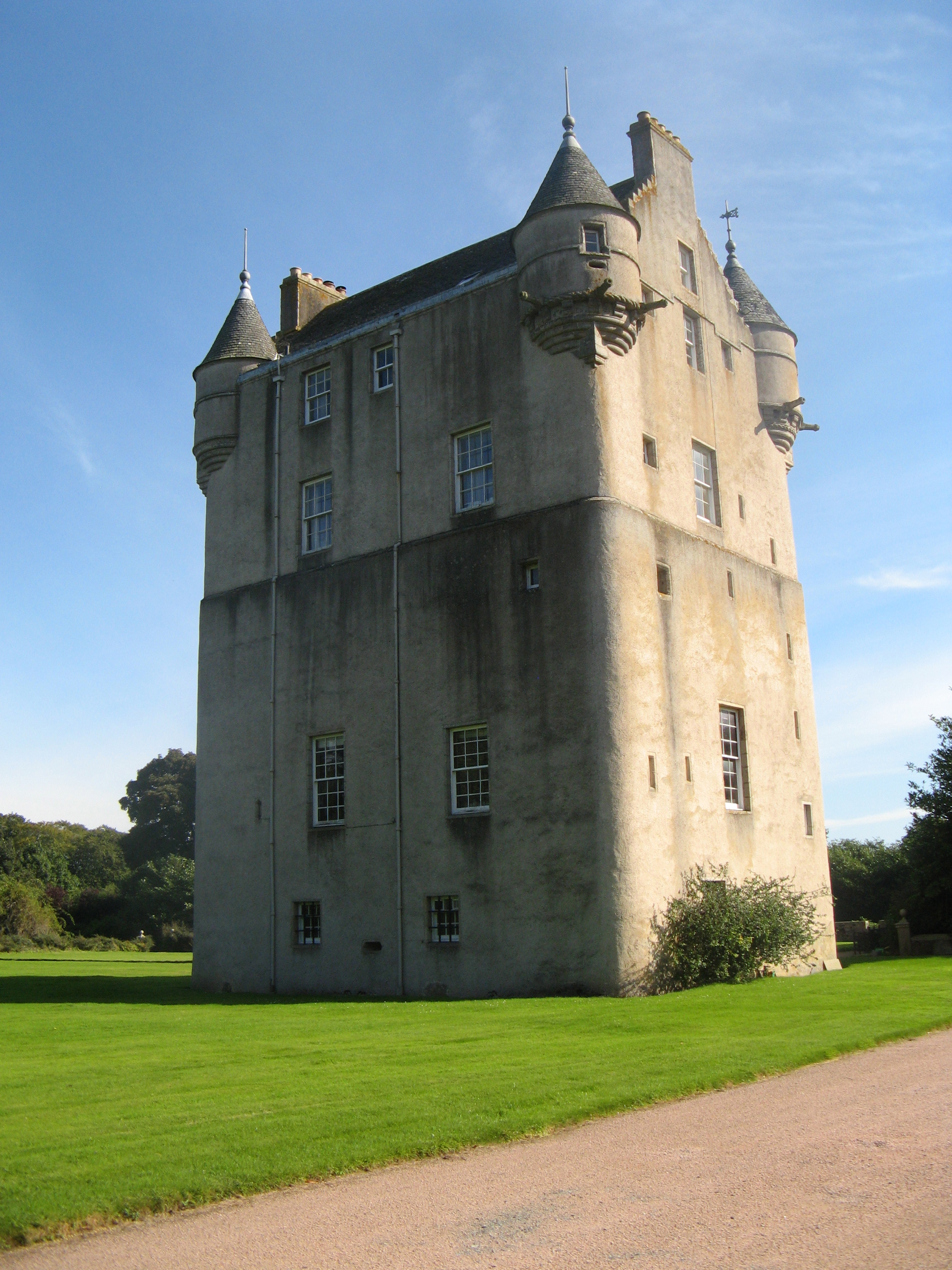
Udny Castle in 2013

Udny Castle is a tower house in the parish of Udny, south-west of the village of Pitmedden and north-east of the hamlet of Udny Green, Aberdeenshire, in the north-east of Scotland. Although the surrounding area is generally flat, the castle is sited on the highest ground and can be seen from a considerable distance. Its exact construction date is unknown, but its foundations probably date from the late 14th or early 15th century. Additional storeys were added and a later extension described as a "modern mansion" was incorporated before being demolished. It is a Category A listed building.

== History ==
The exact construction date is not known but it was probably initially constructed by the Udny family in the 14th or 15th century. The property is first recorded when it is shown on a charter for David II instigated by Ronald of Uldney.

MacGibbon and Ross suggested a construction date of the turn of the 16–17th centuries, but the indentation of the upper floors and thickness of the foundation walls suggest a much earlier date. The main construction work of the keep is believed to have spanned over 100 years and been undertaken by three consecutive lairds; it is reported to have "ruined them all".

The Udny family also owned Knockhall Castle and lived there until 1734 when Knockhall was destroyed by fire; they then returned to Udny. Jamie Fleeman, the Laird's fool, was responsible for saving the family papers from being destroyed in the fire.

The castle was abandoned sometime around 1775, then repair work was undertaken in 1801.

Colonel John Robert Fullerton Udny inherited the estate in 1802. He had been an army officer since 1797 but retired after his marriage to Emily Fitzhugh in 1812. Thereafter he only visited the estate occasionally as his main residence was in London. The couple had one son, John Augustus Udny, but he died a bachelor in 1859. The Colonel's wife died in 1846 after which he had an affair with Ann Allat whom he married on 2 January 1854. However, the couple had a son, John Henry Udny, born out of wedlock on 9 May 1853. A legal case was heard by the House of Lords as to whether John Henry was entitled to inherit the estate as his parents had been unmarried when he was born. The legal arguments describe how the Colonel had wished to do restoration work on the castle but could not afford to do so "owing chiefly to his connection with the turf".

The Colonel died in 1861. The House of Lords had decided in favour of John Henry and he inherited the estate as "though illegitimate at his birth, [he] was legitimated by the subsequent marriage of his parents".

In 1887, it is recorded as owned by John Hay Udny and had been in the family's ownership for several centuries.

A mansion house in the baronial style was added in 1874–75 to the design of architect James Maitland Wardrop (of the Wardrop and Anderson company) but was subsequently demolished during the 1960s. Wardrop's son, Hew, was also an architect and undertook some of the decorative work at the castle. He died suddenly of appendicitis while working at the castle on 4 November 1887.

In October 1950, Robert Udny-Hamilton, 11th Lord Belhaven and Stenton died in the castle, aged 79.

In 1964, restoration work was begun on the original tower house and the mansion house was demolished. Historic Scotland listed the castle as a Category A listed building in April 1971.

== Architecture ==
The castle walls are 8 feet (2.4 m) thick and it has an attic keep measuring 35 feet (11 m) by 43 feet (13 m). The building exterior is harled and it is five storeys high. Its angle turrets are embellished with corbels, some more decorative than others. Bartizans were included when an extra storey was added in the 17th century.

Features include an arched entrance and a vaulted basement. The hall extends the full width of the castle, and is sited on the first floor, accessed by a turnpike stairway. The measurements of the hall are given as being 27 feet (8.2 m) by 21 feet (6.4 m) with a height of 20 feet (6.1 m) to the vault's top. The hall ceiling was given a Jacobean styling during the Victorian era. Some plasterwork added when Wardrop's design work was included remains in the vaulted hall. The fireplace from the castle was removed and is sited in Maryculter House, Kincardineshire.
