= Émile Garçon =

French jurist (1851–1922)

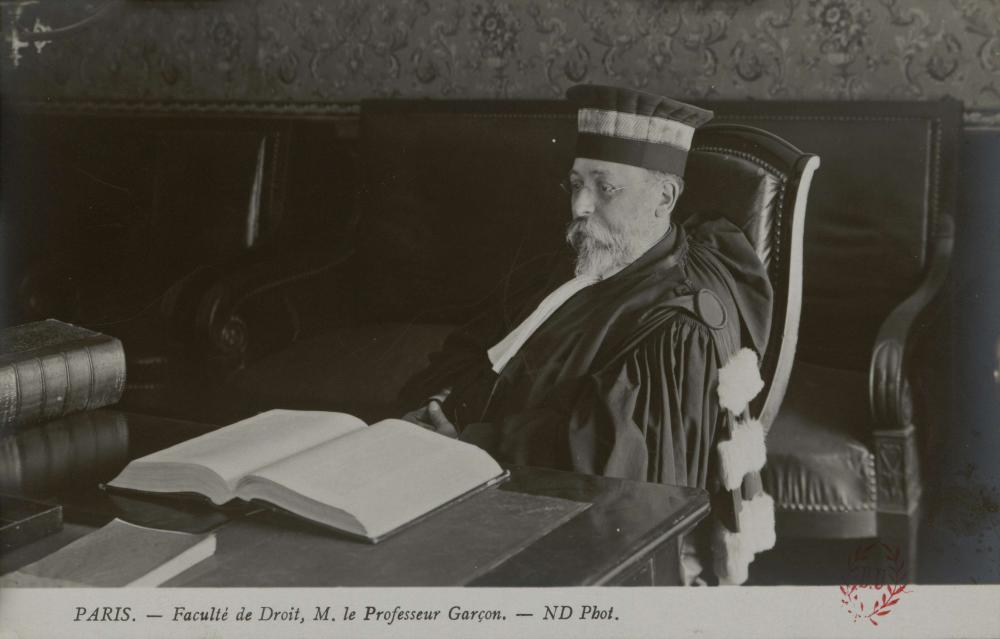
- Professor Garçon in Faculty of Law.
- Born: 26 September 1851; Poitiers, France
- Died: 12 July 1922 (aged 70); Paris, France
- Occupation: Jurist
- Children: Maurice Garçon

Émile Garçon (26 September 1851 - 12 July 1922) was a French jurist. He served as a Law Professor at the University of Paris.

== Biography ==
Doctor of Law from the Poitiers Faculty of Law in 1877 and agrégé des Facultés de droit in 1880, he became Professor of Criminal Law and Comparative Penal Legislation at the Paris Faculty of Law.

== Works ==
- Garçon, Émile (1895). Un Prince allemand physiocrate et ses correspondants, le marquis de Mirabeau et du Pont de Nemours. Paris. OCLC 494052281.
- Garçon, Émile (1896). Les Peines non déshonorantes. Melun. OCLC 494052295.
- Garçon, Émile (1896). Projet de Code pénal russe. Melun. OCLC 490855792.
- Garçon, Émile (1901). Code pénal. Paris: Sirey. OCLC 600746341.
- Garçon, Émile (1905). 1er Congrès du groupe français de l'Union internationale de Droit pénal, Paris, 1905 : discours d'ouverture prononcé à la séance du 7 juin 1905, en présence de M. le Garde des Sceaux. Paris: Imprimerie Chaix. OCLC 490851665.
- Garçon, Émile (1922). Le droit pénal: origines — évolution — état actuel. Paris: Payot. OCLC 954621662.
- Garçon, Émile (1922). Du crime dans ses rapports avec l'Art dramatique et la littérature. Paris. OCLC 881462983.
