= Mary Garson (nun) =

- Born: Mary Sunniva Garson; 3 October 1921; Udny Green, Aberdeenshire, Scotland
- Died: 8 March 2007 (aged 85); Bognor Regis, Sussex, England
- Citizenship: United Kingdom
- Occupation: Nun
- Years active: 1947–2007

Mary Sunniva Garson MBE (3 October 1921 – 8 March 2007) was a Scottish nun. A Catholic convert from Presbyterianism, she bought a house to form a community after being convinced wider action was necessary to help the infirm, after visiting a semi-blind elderly woman caring for two people. As her work began to steadily increase, Garson purchased a second house which allowed her to expand and began to provide sheltered accommodation. The community was later recognised as a pious union in 1959, and she became known as "Sister Mary Garson". Her group later expanded overseas and adopted the Rule of St Benedict in 1978.

== Early life ==
Garson was born on 3 October 1921 in Dedend in Udny Green, Aberdeenshire. She was the only daughter and the oldest of four children of the merchant seaman and later harbour master David Garson and his wife Jessie, née Anderson. Garson was brought up a Presbyterian. She was educated at Invergordon Academy, and later went on to graduate with a Master of Arts degree in psychology from the University of Aberdeen. During World War II, she was commissioned in the Women's Auxiliary Air Force and worked on the testing procedures for recruits into the Royal Air Force. She was later seconded to the British Army to aid with the diagnostic testing of soldiers returning from Burma (now Myanmar). After demobilisation, Garson was employed as an industrial psychologist and later an educational psychologist in Sussex.

== Career ==
She converted to the Roman Catholic faith in 1947 after becoming impressed with a family from that religion with whom she stayed "on the Continent". Garson later described herself as "a reluctant Catholic". Her contact with the Jesuit priest Bernard Bassett persuaded her that she had a religious vocation, but that its character was slowly being discerned. Gerson was encouraged by the clergy of Brighton to work amongst the city's elderly population while practising as a psychologist. She witnessed the elderly's desperation and loneliness; it has been suggested her inspiration was similar to that of fellow Catholic converts Leonard Cheshire and Sue Ryder.

While considering advice she received from Bassett, the chaplain of the Brighton cell asked Garson to visit a semi-blind elderly woman who was caring for her bedridden sister and a 90-year old friend. She was convinced that wider action was necessary and figured that £800 was required to take a mortgage to buy a house in the local area. The priest told Garson that the £800 donation was a coincidence as he had been given that sum by another person who was not aware of her plan. She was granted permission to undertake the project by the Roman Catholic church in March 1954. Garson continued to work as an educational psychologist at a child guidance clinic for the next eighteen months.

When she first opened the house the only seating available was wheelchairs and her group elected to decorate the house before the completion of the sale. Garson's group had the idea of forming a community where dedicated men and women would live a life of "prayer, hospitality and compassion". She drafted a set of rules for her community but Cyril Cowderoy, the Archbishop of Southwark, forbade men from getting into her group. Another difficulty followed in that one of the priests urged guarantors for the house purchase to withdraw from her wildcat scheme. As her work began to steadily increase, Garson sought a second house. She visited a country house which was formerly owned by the singer Vera Lynn, observed the well-stocked bar, and exclaimed to its owner "This would make a beautiful chapel."

She then bought the house and the number of residents increased to around 40. She started the first sheltered accommodation scheme in a third house that housed flats for the active elderly. "If we do our best," said Garson, "God will do the rest." Her co-workers gradually turned themselves into a religious community which were united in purpose and lifestyle and not residing in one home. The community was recognised by Codweroy as a pious union in 1959, and she became known as "Mother Mary Garson". In 1965, Garson's charitable and religious headquarters were moved to the Holy Cross Priory near Heathfield in East Sussex.

The group eventually adopted blue habits and then black veils and crucifixes. The congregation expanded into overseas countries starting in 1974 with a house for elderly people in Sri Lanka, and a large complex in India that embraced a convent, an old people's home, a hospital, creche, and crafts centre for young people which turned into one of five foundations in India. After going to Kenya, the group formally adopted the Rule of St Benedict at a General Chapter in 1978. Garson saw this Rule to "be both sensible and practical" and as The Independent wrote in their obituary of her, "she no doubt recognised St Benedict as one of the first and greatest of management consultants who knew how to make a human organisation work and prosper in harmony in all the problems of daily life in a community."

== Later life and death ==
Garson was heavily inspired by the monks of Worth Abbey in Sussex and particularly Victor Farwell, their first abbot. She lived on the grounds of Worth Abbey in one of its convents and this served as her generalate from 1977 to 1994. The bishop of the Diocese of Arundel and Brighton Bishop Cormac Murphy O'Connor recognised this as a diocesan congregation in 1992. That same year, the sisters were admitted into full association with the Benedictine Confederation. Garson was awarded the Pro Ecclesia et Pontifice for her services to the church in 2002. Two years later she was appointed an MBE for "services to others", and was presented with the award in a ceremony by Phyllida Stewart-Roberts, the Lord Lieutenant of East Sussex on 15 December 2004. Garson retired as prioress-general in 2005. She died at St Joseph's Home, Albert Road, Bognor Regis, Sussex, on 8 March 2007. Following a requiem at Worth Abbey, Garson was buried at Holy Cross Priory in Heathfield, East Sussex, twenty days later.
