= Alexander Forbes, 4th Lord Forbes of Pitsligo =

Scottish Jacobite nobleman and refugee

Alexander Forbes, 4th Lord Forbes of Pitsligo (1678–1762) was a Scottish Jacobite nobleman and refugee, also known as a writer.

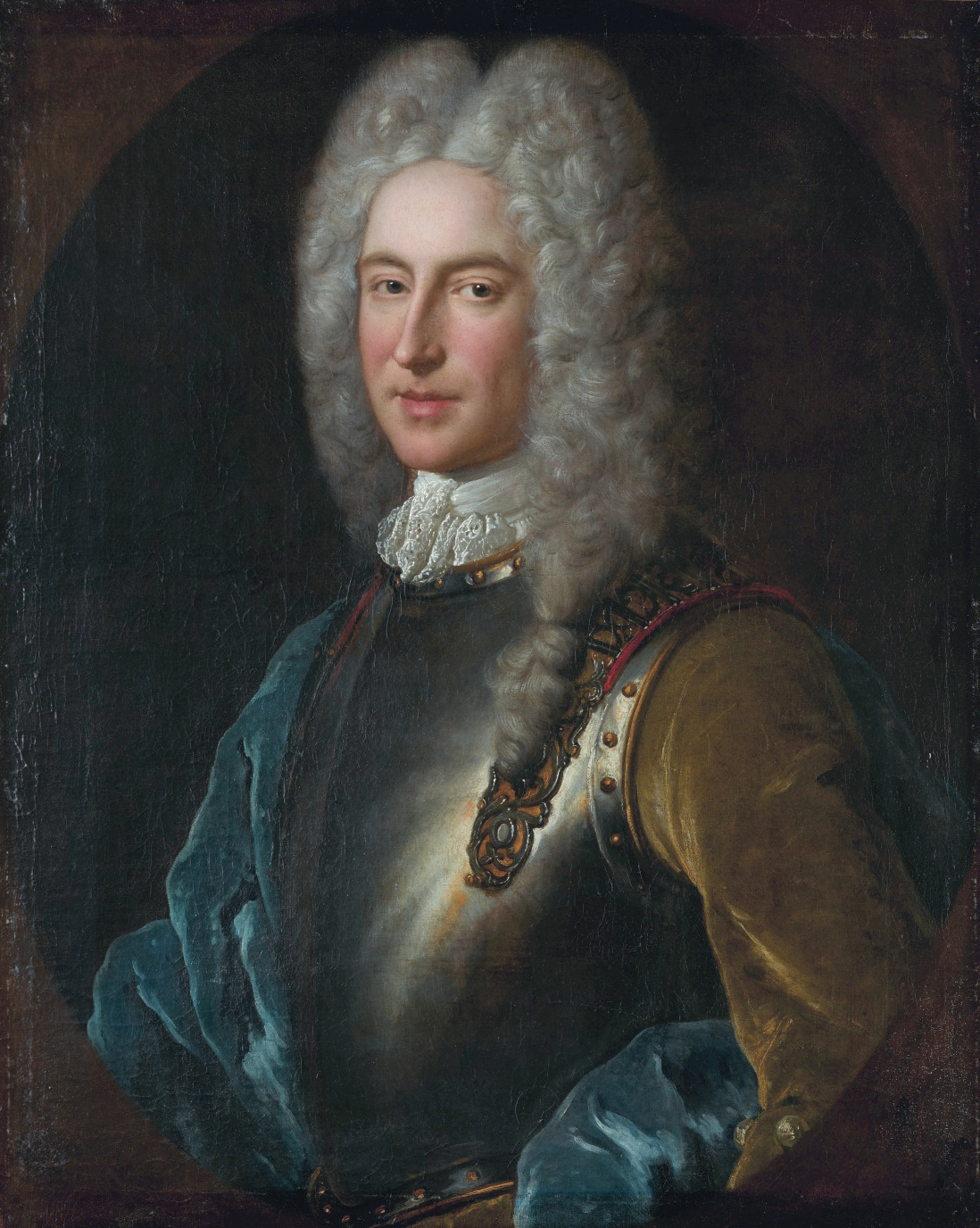
Alexander, 4th Lord Forbes of Pitsligo (Alexis-Simon Belle, 1720)

== Life ==
Arms of the Lord Forbes of Pitsligo: Quarterly: 1st and 4th, Azure, three bears’ heads couped argent, muzzled gules; 2nd and 3rd, Azure, three fraises argent.

He was the only son of Alexander Forbes, 3rd Lord Forbes of Pitsligo, by Lady Sophia Erskine, third daughter of John, 21st and 4th Earl of Mar, and was born 22 May 1678. He succeeded to the estates and title on the death of his father in 1691.

In early manhood, he travelled in France, made the acquaintance of Fénelon, and was introduced by him to Madame Guyon and other quietists. Their influence led him to devote attention to the mystical writers. He was an adherent of the Protestant Episcopal Church of Scotland, and a supporter of the exiled Stuart family. He was strongly opposed to the Act of Union, and on the oath of abjuration being extended to Scotland, ceased to attend Parliament.

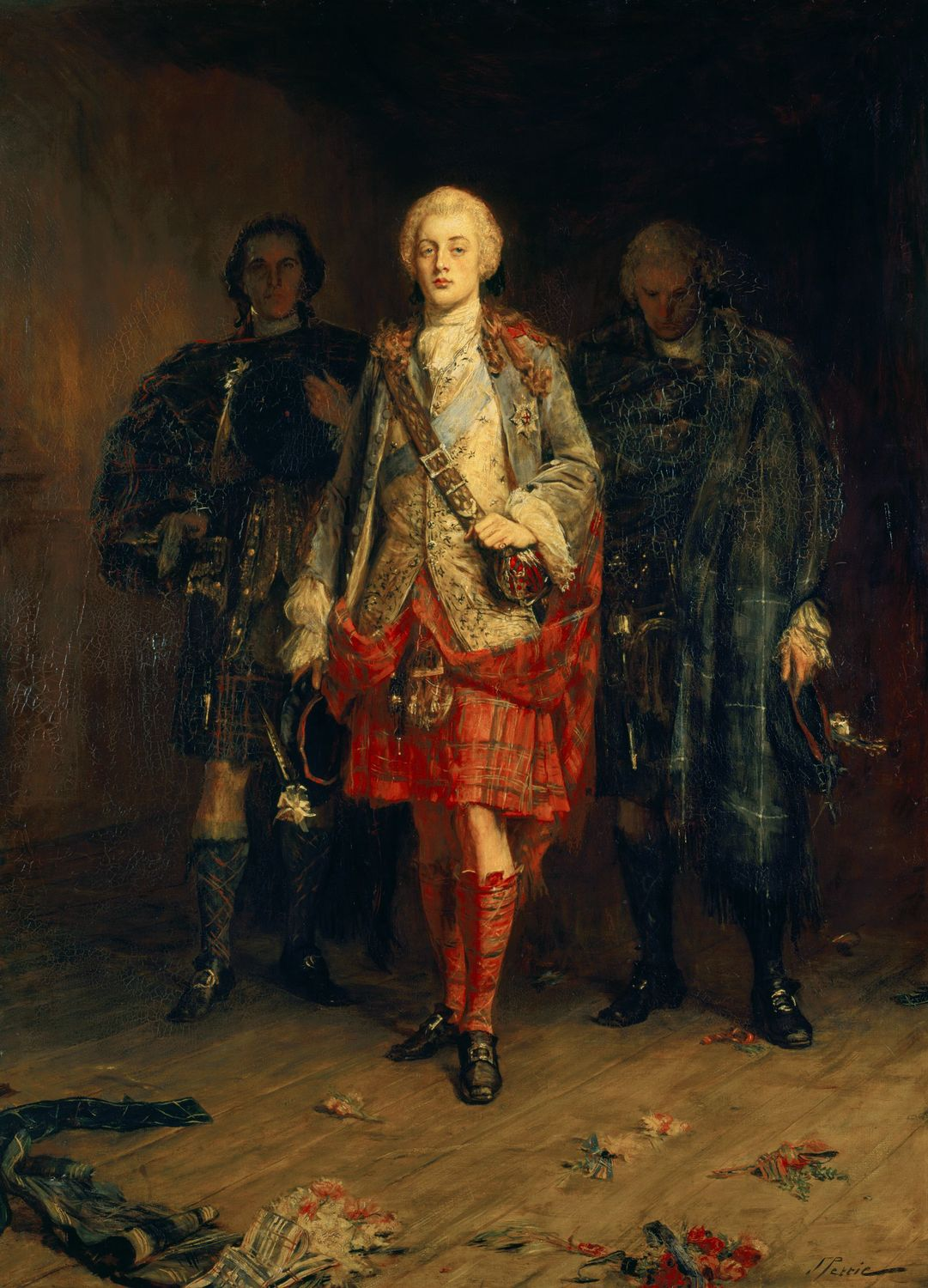
Bonnie Prince Charlie Entering the Ballroom at Holyroodhouse by John Pettie, 1892. Forbes is shown to the Prince's right.

Having taken part in the Jacobite Rebellion of 1715 he was compelled, after the retreat of Mar, to take refuge on the continent. In 1720 he returned to Scotland, taking up residence mainly at Pitsligo, where he continued a correspondence with the quietists, and engaged in a kind of transcendental devotion. On the outbreak of the Jacobite Rebellion of 1745, though sixty-seven years of age and asthmatic, he took up arms on behalf of the Stuarts. He raised a regiment of cavalry, numbering about a hundred, and composed chiefly of Aberdeenshire gentlemen and their tenants. He arrived at Edinburgh on 8 October 1745, a few days after the Jacobite victory at the battle of Prestonpans. After the defeat at the battle of Culloden he remained in hiding at what is today known as The World's End in nearby Fraserburgh and also in a cave (still known as Lord Pitsligo's Cave) among the cliffs near Quarry Head, approximately 2.5 miles from Rosehearty. He disguised himself as a beggar named Sanny Brown.

His estates were seized in 1748, but in the act of attainder he was named Lord Pitsligo, a misnomer for Lord Forbes of Pitsligo. On this account he tried to obtain a reversal of the attainder, but though the court of session gave judgment in his favour 10 November 1749, this decision was reversed on appeal to the House of Lords 1 February 1750. After this the search for him relaxed, and he stayed for the most part with his son at Auchiries, under the name of Mr. Brown. The Countess of Erroll conveyed messages to him using the services of Jamie Fleeman, the Laird of Udny's fool. In March 1756 a party was sent to search for him, but he hid behind a wainscot, concealed by a bed in which a lady slept. He died in 1762, aged 84.

== Works ==
In 1734 he published Essays Moral and Philosophical. He wrote Thoughts concerning Man's Condition in 1732. It was published in 1763, and again in 1835, with memoir by his kinsman Lord Medwyn.

== Family ==
He was twice married: first, to Rebecca, daughter of John Norton, a London merchant by whom he had one son, John, Master of Forbes, who purchased his father's estate upon his death; and secondly, to Elizabeth Allen, who had been companion to his first wife, but by this marriage there was no issue. His grandson, the banker Sir William Forbes, 6th Baronet, purchased Pitsligo Castle.

== Notes ==
Peerage of Scotland
Preceded by Alexnder Forbes	Lord Forbes of Pitsligo; 1690–1746	Forfeit
