= List of Sites of Special Scientific Interest in Gordon and Aberdeen =

The following is a list of Sites of Special Scientific Interest in the Gordon and Aberdeen Area of Search. NatureScot, the Scottish government body responsible for Sites of Special Scientific Interest (SSSIs) includes these SSSIs in the area of Aberdeenshire, the City of Aberdeen and Moray reflecting changes in local government boundaries. For other areas, see List of SSSIs by Area of Search.

- Balmedie Quarry
- Bellscamphie
- Bin Quarry
- Collieston to Whinnyfold Coast
- Corby, Lily And Bishop's Lochs (Note: Corby, Lily and Bishop's Lochs SSSI lies in part within Aberdeenshire and in part within the City of Aberdeen, a separate local authority.)
- Cove (Note: Cove SSSI is situated within the City of Aberdeen, a local authority entirely surrounded by, but distinct from Aberdeenshire)
- Craigs of Succoth
- Den of Pitlurg (Note: Den of Pitlurgh SSSI is situated on the boundary of Aberdeenshire and Moray.)
- Foveran Links
- Gight Woods
- Green Hill of Strathdon (Note: Green Hill of Strathdon is also a SAC (Special Area of Conservation) covering a slightly larger area than the designated SSSI.)
- Hill of Barra
- Hill of Johnston
- Hill of Towanreef (Note: Hill of Towanreef is also a SAC.)
- Inchrory
- Ladder Hills
- Loch of Skene
- Meikle Loch and Kippet Hills
- Mortlach Moss (Note: Mortlach Moss is also a Special Area of Conservation (SAC).)
- Morven and Mullachdubh (Note: Morven and Mullachdubh is also a Special Area of Conservation (SAC).)
- Moss of Kirkhill
- Nigg Bay (Note: Nigg Bay SSSI is entirely located within the City of Aberdeen and is not related to Nigg Bay in the Highland Scottish council area.)
- Old Wood of Drum
- Paradise Wood
- Pitcaple and Legatsden Quarries
- Pittodrie
- Red Moss of Netherley
- Red Moss, Oldtown
- Rhynie Chert
- Sands of Forvie and Ythan Estuary (Note: The Sands of Forvie are part of the Forvie National Nature Reserve. Together with the Ythan Estuary they are designated the Sands of Forvie and Ythan Estuary SSSI.)
- Scotstown Moor (Note: Scotstown Moor SSSI is located entirely within the City of Aberdeen.)
- Tilliefoure Wood
- Tips of Corsemaul and Tom Mor (Note: Tips of Corsemaul and Tom Mor is also a Special Protection Area (SPA).)
- Wartle Moss
- Whitehill
- Whitehills to Melrose Coast
