= River Ythan =

River in Scotland

Coordinates: 57°18′N 2°00′W

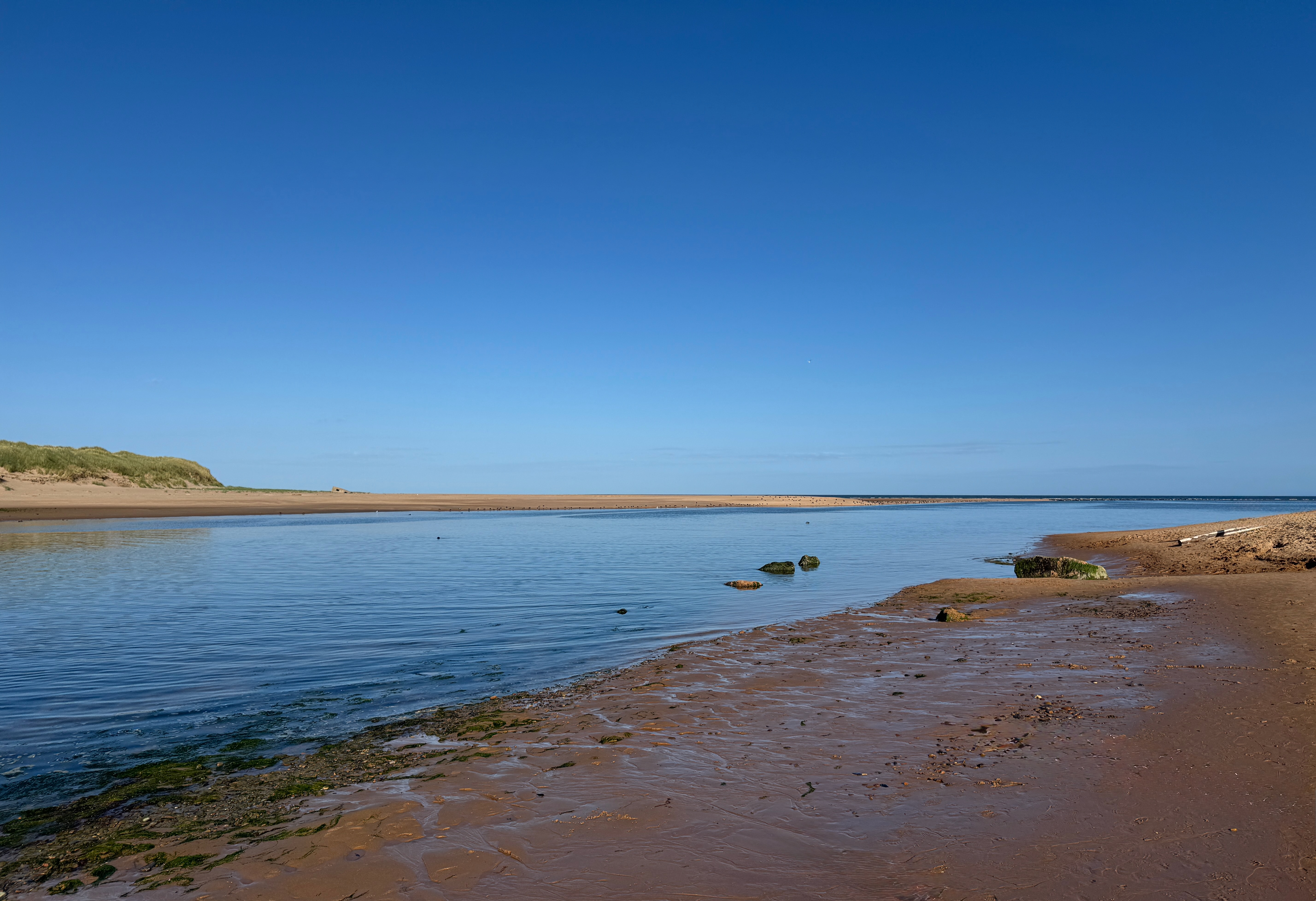
- The mouth of the River Ythan, draining into the North Sea near Newburgh

Location
- Country: Scotland

Physical characteristics
- Source: Wells of Ythan
  - location: Near Ythanwells, Aberdeenshire
- Mouth: North Sea
  - location: Near Newburgh
- Length: 60 kilometres (37 mi)
- Basin size: 680 square kilometres (260 sq mi)
- Discharge
  - average: 6 cubic metres per second (210 cu ft/s)

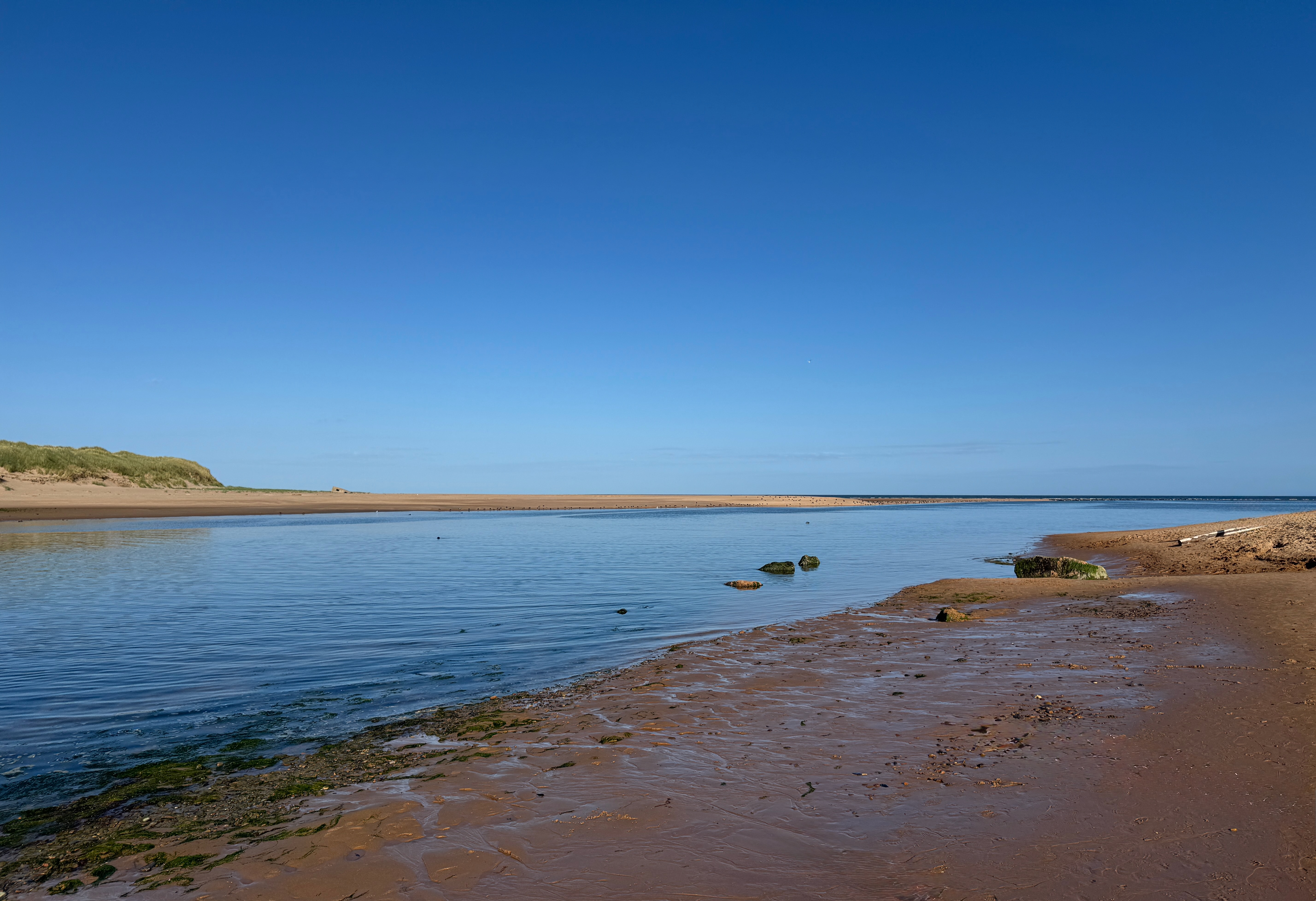
The mouth of the River Ythan, draining into the North Sea in the Forvie National Nature Reserve, near Newburgh

The Ythan /ˈaɪθən/ is a river in the north-east of Scotland rising at Wells of Ythan near the village of Ythanwells and flowing south-eastwards through the towns of Fyvie, Methlick and Ellon before flowing into the North Sea near Newburgh, in Formartine.

The lower reach of the river is known as the Ythan Estuary and forms part of the River Ythan, Sands of Forvie and Meikle Loch Special Protection Area for conservation, particularly as a breeding ground for three tern species (common tern, little tern and Sandwich tern) (Lumina, 2004).

The River Ythan has a catchment area of 680 km^{2} (260 sq mi). Reported average discharge figures vary, with estimates of 6 m^{3}/s (210 cu ft/s) or 7.2 m^{3}/s (250 cu ft/s).

== Nitrate Vulnerable Zone ==
The Scottish Government has designated the River Ythan catchment as a Nitrate Vulnerable Zone following concerns about the spread of algal mats in the river during the 1990s. The resulting restrictions on the use of fertilisers in the catchment were criticised by many farmers, as around 90% of the land in the catchment area is used for agriculture. However, the designation and subsequent actions to address the issue under the European Union's LIFE Fund Ythan Project have led to improvements in water quality, as an increasing number of farmers adopted techniques such as creating buffer strips between fields and the river, along with nutrient budgeting. Both the expansion of agri-environment schemes in the area and individual river restoration work undertaken under the auspices of the Ythan Project have contributed to an increase in wildlife habitat across the catchment.

== Etymology ==
The name Ythan may be derived from a Brittonic source, cognate with Old Welsh eith meaning "gorse" (Welsh eithin) or from an early *Iectona meaning "talkative one" (Welsh iaith; cf. River Ithon).

== Fishing ==
Fishing on the River Ythan is subject to conservation measures intended to protect populations of Atlantic salmon and sea trout.

== See also ==
- Ythan Wells Roman Camp site
