= Hackley Head =

Coastal headland in Aberdeenshire, Scotland

Coordinates: 57.33173°N 1.95514°W

Hackley Head (otherwise Forvie Ness) is a coastal headland in Aberdeenshire, in north-east Scotland. It lies south of Hackley Bay and north of the Sands of Forvie and the Ythan estuary, near the village of Collieston.

The headland forms part of the coastline between Hackley Bay and the Sands of Forvie, overlooking the Ythan estuary.
