= Thomas Millie Dow =

Scottish painter (1848–1919)

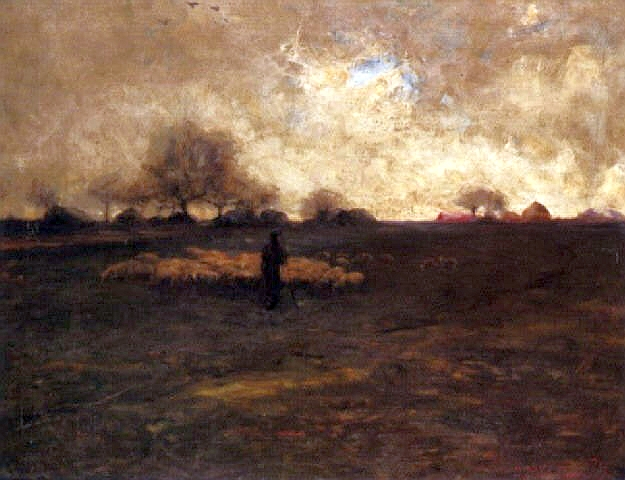
Thomas Millie Dow: Late Autumn at Barbazon (1879)

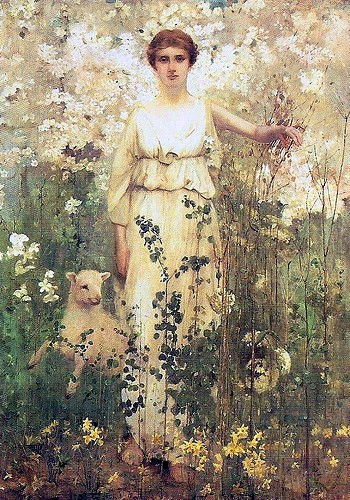
Thomas Millie Dow: Spring (1886)

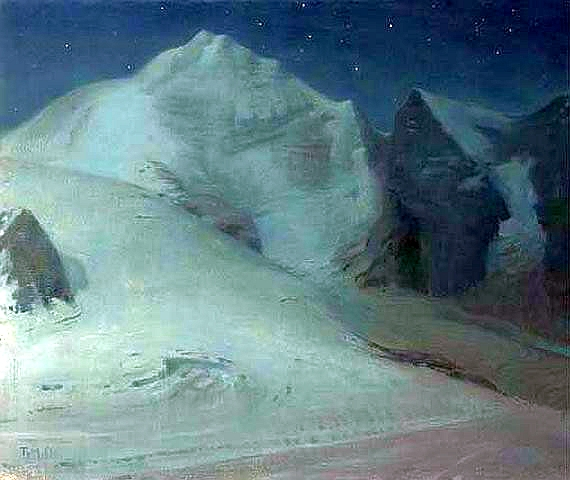
Thomas Millie Dow: Moonlight in the Alps (1888)

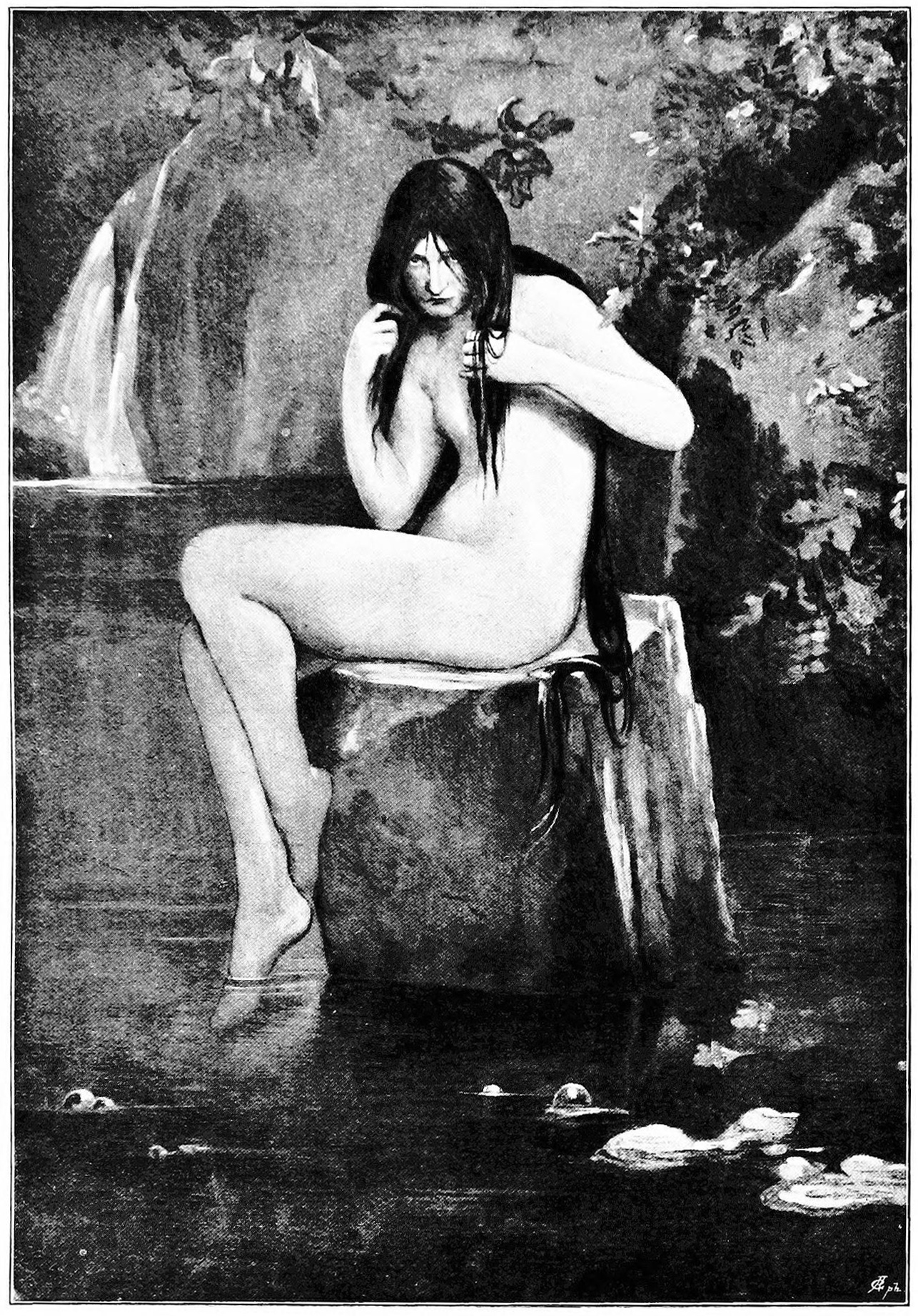
Thomas Millie Dow: The Kelpie (1895)

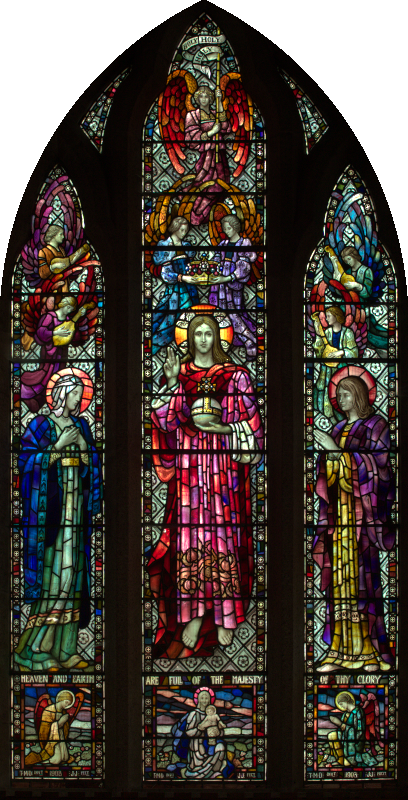
Stained-glass window, designed by Thomas Millie Dow and made by John Jennings, showing Christ in Majesty with the Virgin Mary and St John the Evangelist, at the east end of St John's-in-the-Fields Church, St Ives, Cornwall, UK. Thomas Millie Dow was the husband of the donor of the window, Florence Dow, née Cox (1903)

Thomas Millie Dow (28 October 1848 – 3 July 1919) was a Scottish artist and member of the Glasgow Boys school. He was a member of The Royal Scottish Society of Painters in Watercolour and the New English Art Club.

== Early life and education ==
Dow was born 28 October 1848 at Dysart, Fife. He was educated for the law and was expected to follow his father and brother into the family law firm in Kirkcaldy. Deciding against a career in law, Dow went to Paris in 1877 and enrolled for classes at the École nationale supérieure des Beaux-Arts under Jean-Léon Gérôme. Later, in 1879 he registered with the ateliers of Rudolphe Julien and Carolus Duran. Of his earlier instruction in painting and drawing little is known except for the encouragement he received from his uncle Alexander Millie, an amateur artist.

Two young men among the many young British and American students registered for classes in Paris in the late 1870s became Dow's particular friends. They were the Englishman William Stott of Oldham and the American Abbott Handerson Thayer. Both men were to remain important figures in Dow's personal and professional life and, as both had strong personalities and strong ideas about art, they came to exert a considerable influence over the artistic choices he made. Among other friends studying in Paris at the time were the Glasgow-based artists John Lavery, Alexander Roche, James Paterson and Alexander Mann.

== Work ==
Dow painted in oils, watercolour and pastels. His subjects include flower studies, landscapes, portraits and decorative allegorical works. The geographical range of his landscapes extends through Scotland, the northeastern United States, Morocco, northern Italy and Cornwall. Using a subtly refined palette he chose to depict the quiet moods of nature. The subjects of his compositions range from the intense stillness of woodland to the calm before a storm at sea; and from dusk deepening on a northern shore to the lifting haze of a Mediterranean spring morning.

From 1877 to 1879 Dow spent the winters in the Paris studios and making occasional sketching excursions with fellow students Mann, Paterson, and Bell, to the villages of Barbizon and Grez-sur-Loing in the Forest of Fontainebleau. Summers were spent painting in the towns and villages along the east coast of Scotland, travelling from Dysart through St Andrews and on up to Stonehaven, Cullen, Cowie, Collieston and Forvie Ness.

Upon his return from Paris and based at home in Dysart records show Dow exhibiting at the Royal Scottish Academy (RSA) in Edinburgh from 1878 and at the Royal Glasgow Institute of Fine Art (RGIFA) from 1879. However his letters to the Thayer family from this period reveal the degree of anxiety he felt about he direction his career should take.

On 6 September 1883 Dow sailed on the "Devonia" from Glasgow to New York. From there he travelled up the Hudson River to the home of Abbott Thayer and his wife Kate Bloede at Cornwall-on-Hudson. (Thayer had built there a studio on land owned by the Stillman family.) Dow stayed in the US into the early summer of 1884. During these several months he produced what may be his best-known landscape, The Hudson River (Kelvingrove Art Gallery and Museum, Glasgow). It is a view of the river taken from the Thayer's house.

The US visit had re-invigorated Dow. His letters to Thayer between 1885 and 1887 reveal his renewed enthusiasm for landscape. During this period he produced Ragweed and Crows (Hunterian, University of Glasgow), among other fine paintings. Dow traveled out of the city, south to Moniaive, for his first allegorical painting The Coming of Spring, and north for his study of birches, In a Wood at Forres, which was bought by Alexander Mann. He had begun a series of commissions, the first being Portrait of John Nairn (Kirkcaldy Museum and Art Gallery) and writes of working on a likeness in pastels of his sister Mary Lady in Black (private collection). Dow was at this time sharing the Glasgow studio of William York Macgregor and living with Mary and her husband Allan McLean, the lawyer, amateur painter and art collector.

It is for the work completed between 1885 and 1895 that Dow is most closely associated with that group of artists who later became known as the Glasgow Boys. Dow is among the 21 Glasgow-based artists whose work is assessed in David Martin's contemporary account entitled The Glasgow School of Painting (George Bell & Sons 1897). In his piece on Dow Martin wrote as follows. "His perception of colour is similar to his use of paint – keen and refined; and his observation of nature such as to give a true feeling of form, without a slavish imitation." Clearly Dow's subject matter and technique appealed to Martin. And he draws attention to what others have found since in Dow's work, that is, his "faculty of placing on canvas the essence of the abstract qualities of his subject, with a fine decorative arrangement of line and colour masses, and, let the theme be an idyllic landscape or an imaginative figure-subject, he combines in a satisfactory result the ideal with the real".

Though the Glasgow School grouping was "geographical in nature rather than stylistic" as Paul Harris makes clear in his introduction to the 1976 edition of Martin's account, it was to gain them a wider audience. Exhibitions at the Grosvenor Gallery and the Grafton Galleries in London led to invitations from Secession galleries in Vienna, Munich, Berlin in the 1890s and, later, to exhibitions in U.S. cities. Dow also joined the New English Art Club (NEAC) in 1887 and exhibited with them until 1891. Dow spent the summer of 1888 travelling in Switzerland and Germany painting in the mountains, some of the time in the company of William Stott. Stott's Portrait of Tom Dow is held in Edinburgh by the National Galleries of Scotland. He spent the winter/spring 88/89 in Morocco. Among his Tangier paintings is the pastel A Spring Day, Morocco (Kirkcaldy AG).

Dow married Florence Pilcher (née Cox) in 1891. Florence, a widow, had a boy and a girl from her first marriage. Dow's own daughter Mary Rosamond was born in 1892. Two years later, in 1894, the family moved from Glasgow to St Ives, Cornwall where Dow joined his friends and fellow painters Louis Grier and Lowell Dyer as members of the St Ives Art Club. Though living far from Glasgow, records show that Dow continued to exhibit there and in other cities in Scotland. Among his paintings shown at the RGIFA in 1892 were The Enchanted Wood (private collection) and, in 1894, The Herald of Winter 1894 (McManus Galleries Dundee).

For several years from 1896 the Dows spent the winter months in Italy. His Italian paintings include several watercolours and pastels of Apennine valleys and villages and some well-known Venetian landmarks. For his larger pieces he continued to paint allegorical subjects: The Kelpie 1895 (whereabouts unknown), A Vision of Spring 1901 (Manchester Art Gallery), the triptych Eve 1904 (Walker Art Gallery), and Sirens of the North 1911 (McManus Galleries Dundee). Of the Cornish paintings his most frequent subject in both oils and pastels is the harbour at St Ives. This he depicts in contrasting moods, busy with boats in the sunshine and lying calm under a moonlit sky.

Dow died on 3 July 1919 at St Ives, Cornwall, England and is buried at Zennor.
