= Foveran Links =

Dune system in Aberdeenshire, Scotland

- Site of Special Scientific Interest
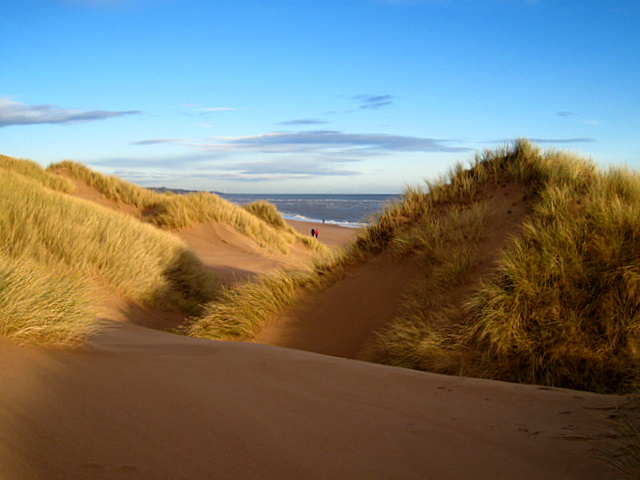

- Location within Aberdeenshire
- Location of Foveran Links.
- Area of search: North East Scotland
- Coordinates: 57.293109°N 2.0016430°W
- Interest: Geological
- Area: 104.41 ha (258.0 acres)
- Notification date: 8 December 2020

Foveran Links is a Site of Special Scientific Interest (SSSI) in the parish of Foveran, Aberdeenshire, Scotland. It comprises a mobile dune system along the coast south of the Ythan Estuary, which separates it from the sand dunes of the Forvie National Nature Reserve. The southern part of the site was partially destroyed by the construction of the Trump International Golf Links resort, leading to consultation on the removal of its SSSI status.

== Bibliography ==
- Hansom, J.D. (2007). Assessment of the Geomorphological Interests at Foveran Links SSSI (PDF) (Report).
- "Foveran Links SSSI". SiteLink. NatureScot.
