= Newburgh, Aberdeenshire =

Coordinates: 57.31557°N 2.00164°W

Newburgh
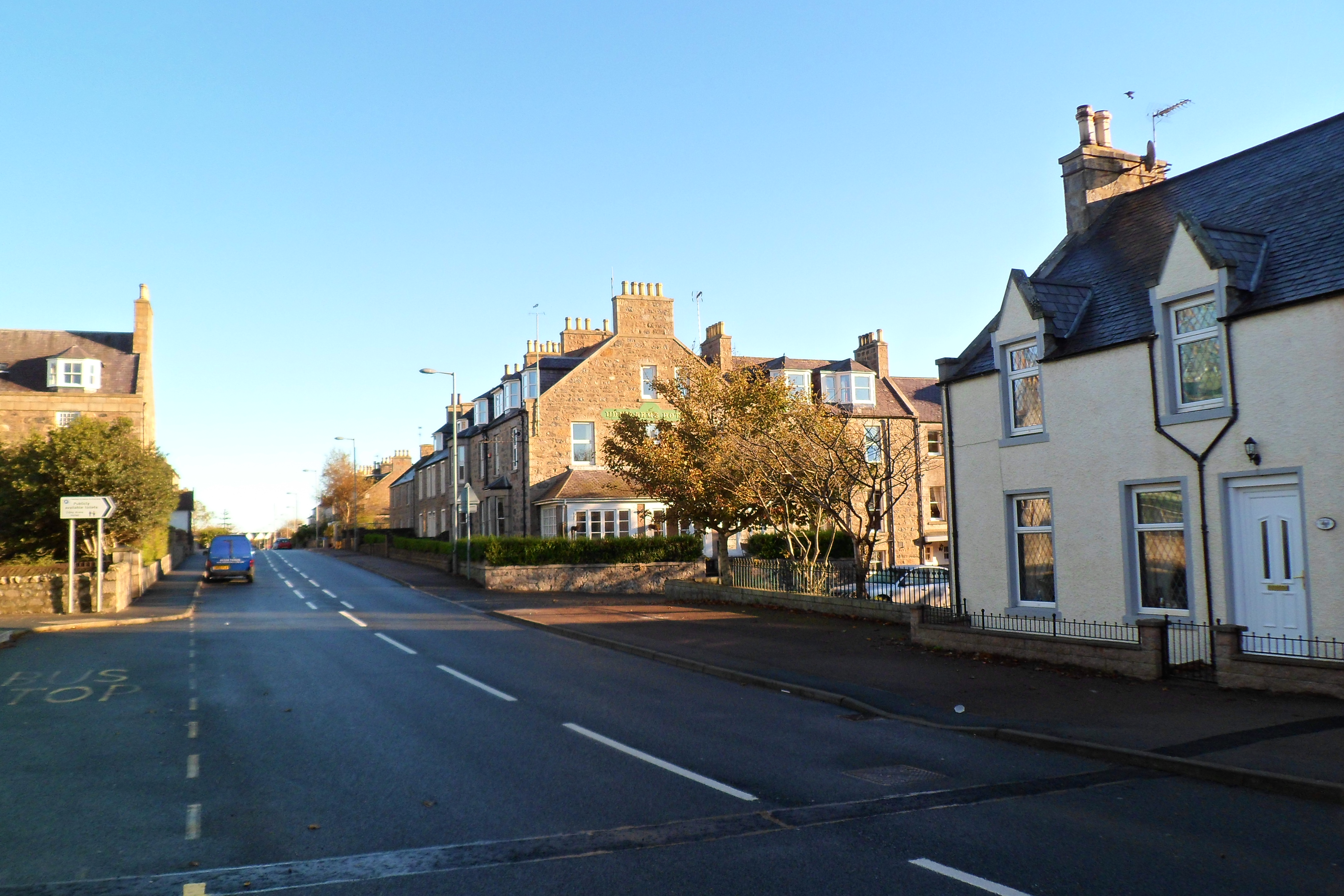
- Main Road with view of the Udny Arms Hotel

- Location within Aberdeenshire
- Population: 1,560 (2020)
- OS grid reference: NJ998254
  - Edinburgh: 104 mi (167 km)
  - London: 408 mi (657 km)
- Council area: Aberdeenshire
- Lieutenancy area: Aberdeenshire
- Country: Scotland
- Sovereign state: United Kingdom
- Post town: ELLON
- Postcode district: AB41
- Police: Scotland
- Fire: Scottish
- Ambulance: Scottish
- UK Parliament: Gordon and Buchan
- Scottish Parliament: Aberdeenshire East

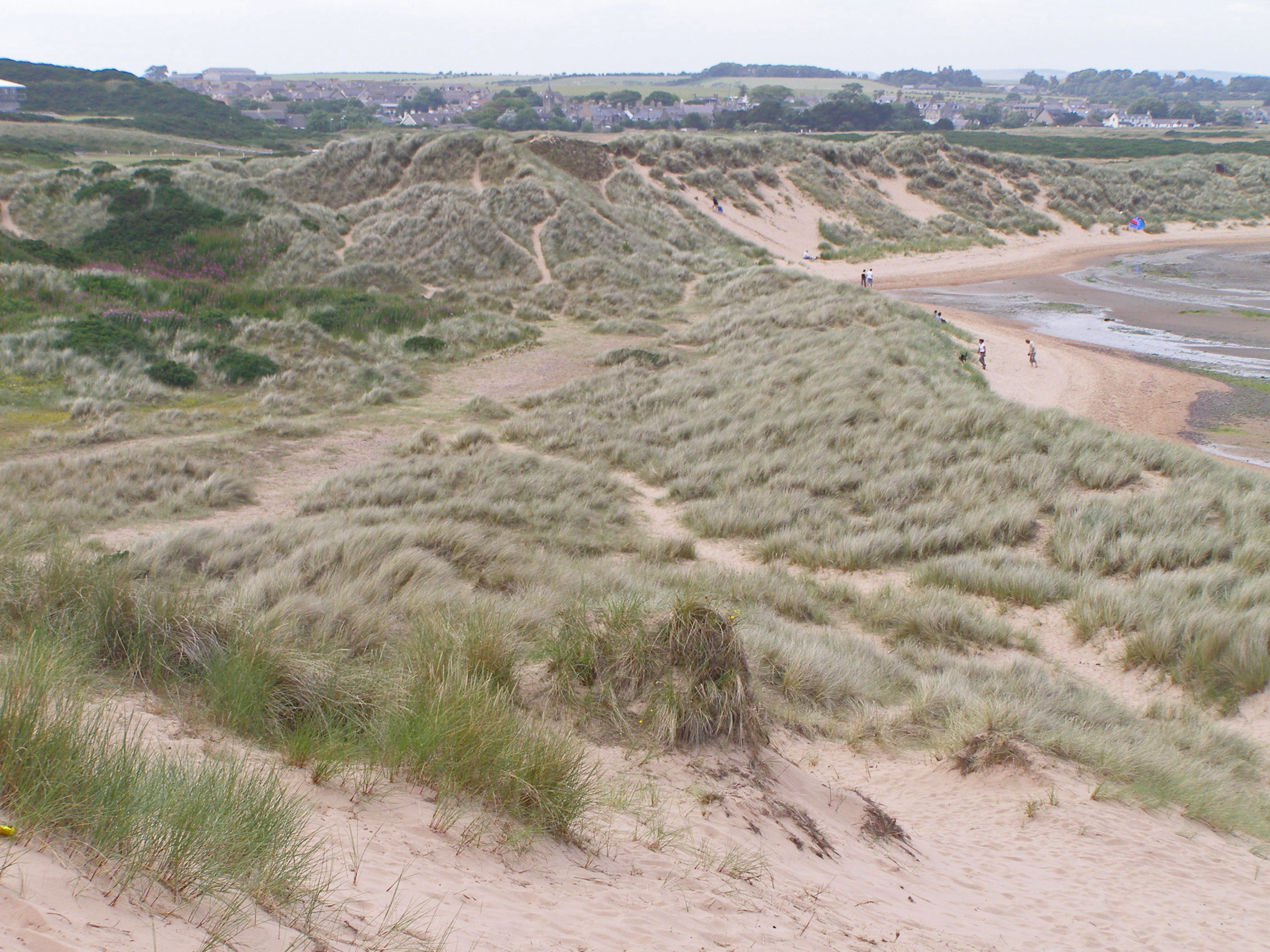
Dunes adjacent to Newburgh on south bank of Ythan Estuary

Newburgh is a coastal village in Aberdeenshire, Scotland. The village dates to 1261 AD, when William St. Clair, 6th Baron of Roslin, wanted to establish a chapel in the area. Originally built as a school, somewhat later the chapel of Holy Rood was established.

== Geography ==
Video of a seal at Newburgh beach, Aberdeenshire.

Newburgh is on the Ythan Estuary and near the Sands of Forvie. Near the estuary mouth, the presence of tern colonies is notable, since there are several distinct species that utilise the north banks of the Ythan Estuary, and comprise a meaningful percentage of the breeding pairs of terns in the United Kingdom. In the summer terns can be observed feeding in their characteristic diving patterns approximately 600 to 900 metres (660 to 980 yd) inland from the estuary. The Forvie Nature Reserve is very near and to the north, where there is said to be the largest eider duck colony in the world. Beside the beach is an eighteen-hole golf course with its bird shaped clubhouse and the Udny Arms restaurant.

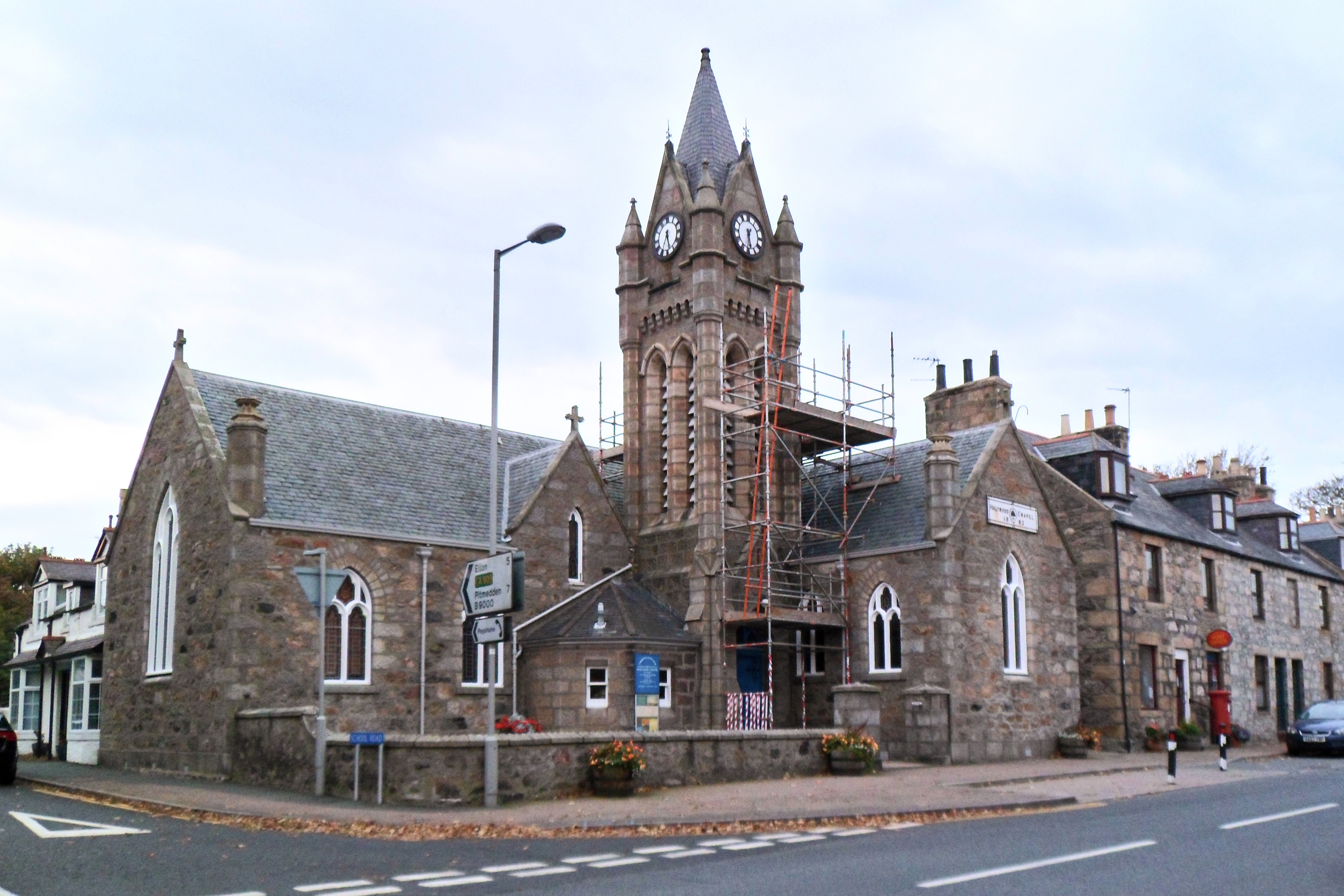
Holy Rood Chapel in Newburgh

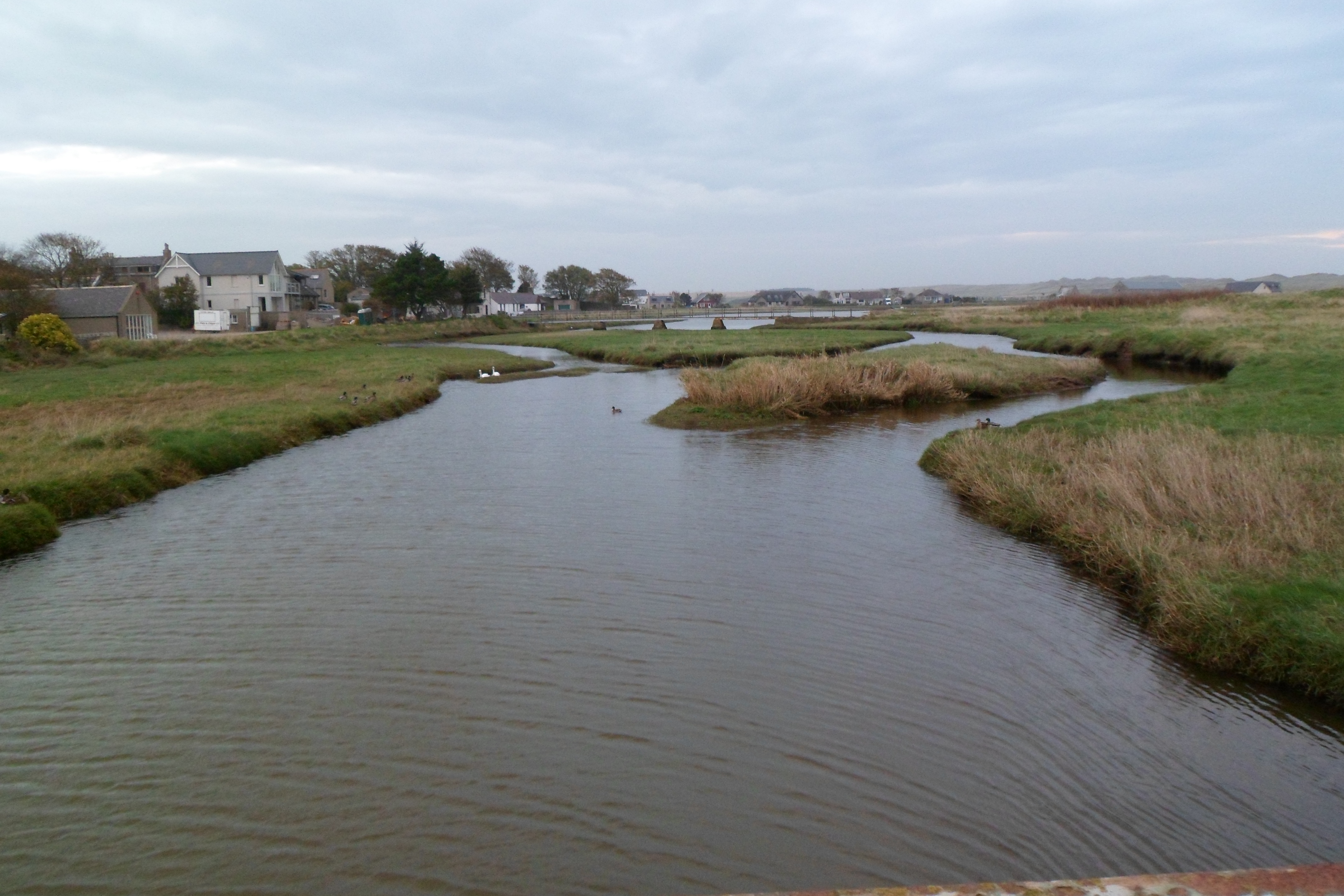
Ythan Estuary

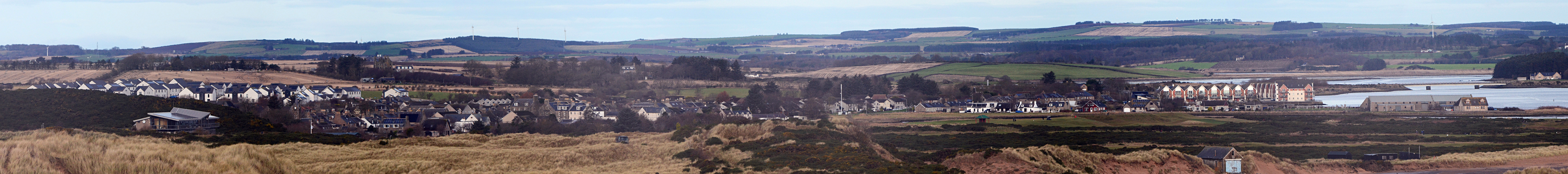
Panoramic view of Newburgh seen from a dune on the nearby beach

== History ==
During the nineteenth century, Newburgh was a main sea port for the nearby town of Ellon. A number of clipper ships sailed to destinations all over the globe to deliver tea and other cargoes and coal barges sailed up the east coast to offload at the quayside. Several of the wealthier clipper sea captains built houses in the village and named them after their most frequent ports of call. Hence several imposing properties exist in the village such as Shanghai house, Santa Cruz and Sydney house.

Newburgh was a victim of bombing in World War 2. Just past the eastern end of the Ythan Bridge, is a bomb crater left by an attacking German aircraft, the bomb, aimed at the wharf, skipped over the bridge and exploded on the embankment beside the Cruden Bay Road. Other bombs fell beside a mill at the south of the village (12 January 1942) and several dropped in the estuary whilst trying to attack buildings on the quayside.

A pillbox was located at the Ythan bridge; although this bridge has been demolished, the pillbox remains.

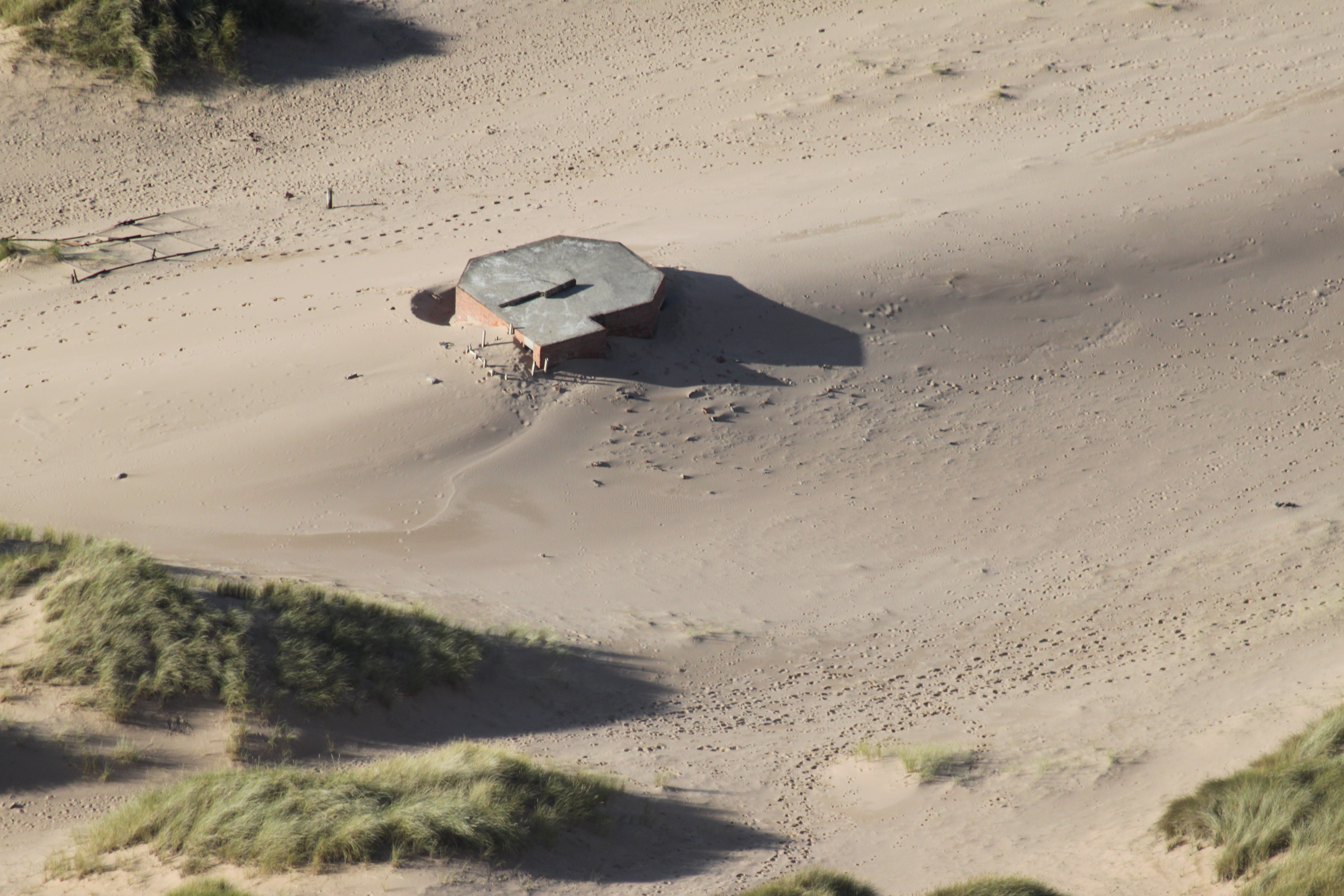
Pillbox and anti-invasion poles

The beach was classed as a high invasion threat from German units based on Norway. A number of pillboxes along with barbed wire, anti-tank blocks and scaffolding poles (that ran almost to Aberdeen along the coast) were installed.

Landmines were also planted in areas between Newburgh estuary and Aberdeen, in December 2012 a landmine was found in the dunes. It's unclear how it got there, as the listed minefield were at Forvie and Menie. Mines have been known to be dragged along the coast by currents.

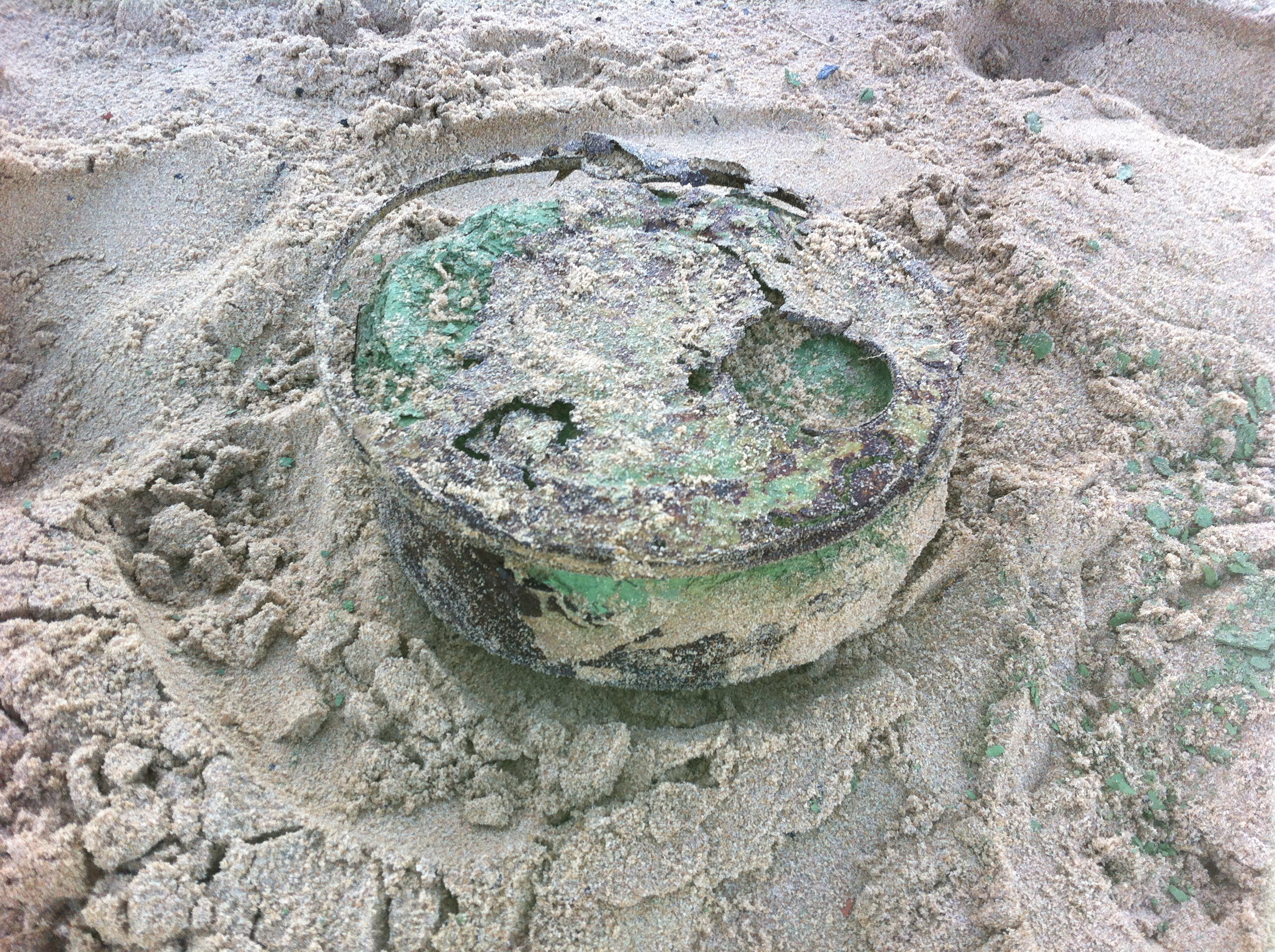
Newburgh Landmine

2005 saw a sudden expansion in housing in the village, with houses being built just west of the local school, and near the Ythan Hotel, at the southernmost point of the village. Whilst the houses at the west end of Newburgh were a marketing success, residents were fairly critical of the properties going up next to the Ythan, dubbing the area too swampy for the foundations.

== Fishing ==
The Annual Reports of the Fishery Board for Scotland provide an insight into the fishing in Newburgh in the years before the First World War. The report for 1900 relates that "only small boats fish from this creek. Fishermen engage also in piloting."

Fishery Statistics

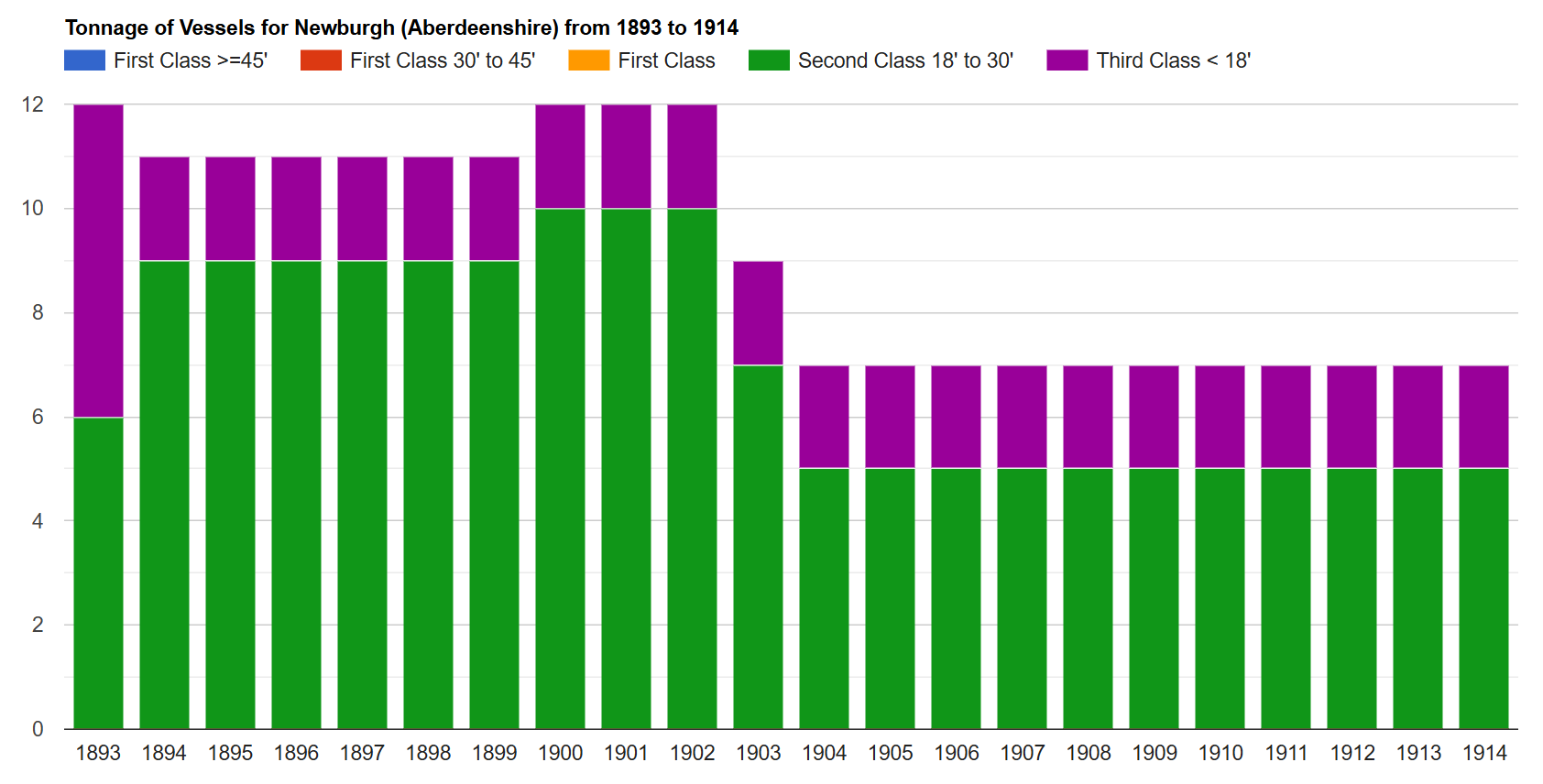
Tonnage of vessels

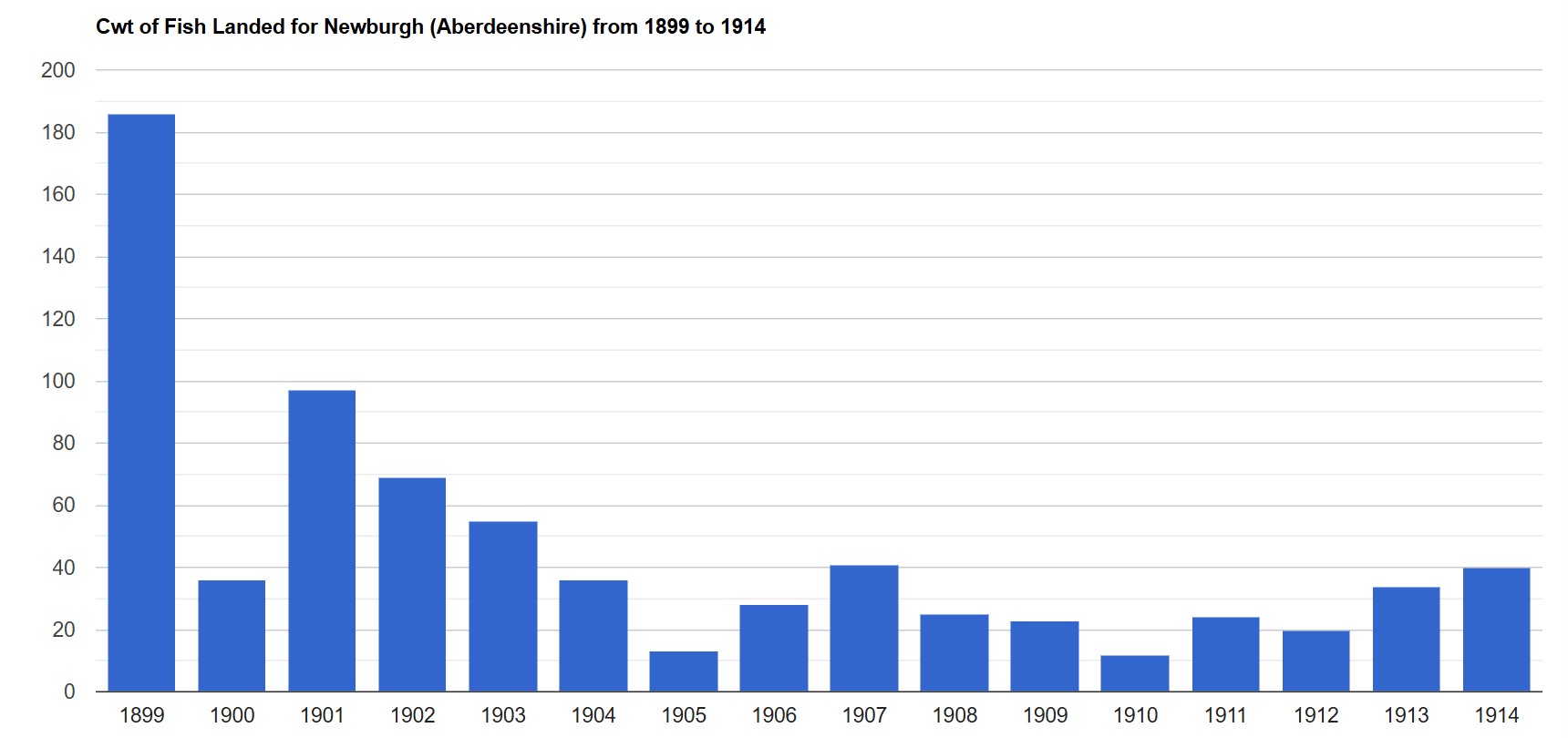
Cwt of fish landed

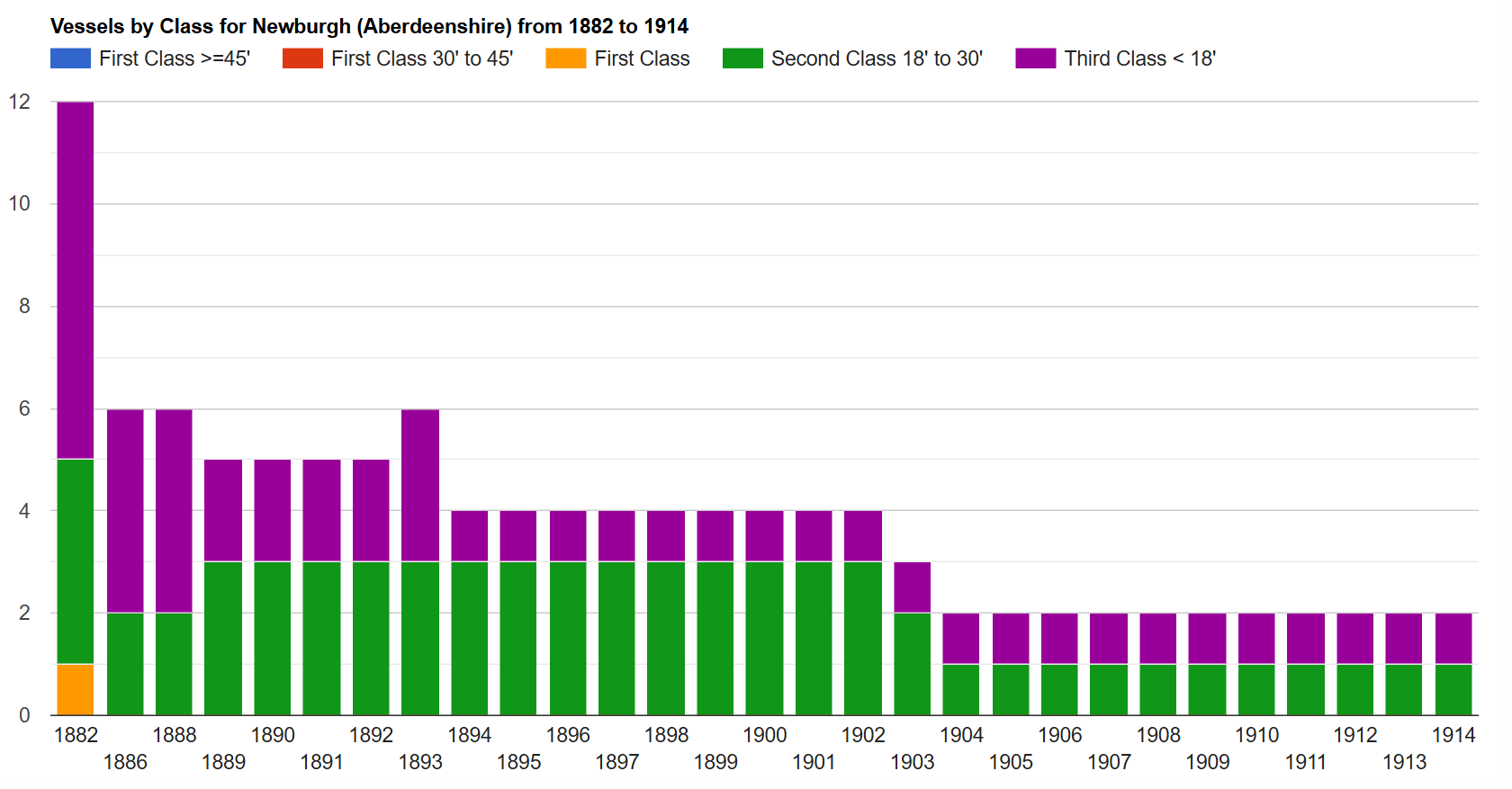
Vessels by class

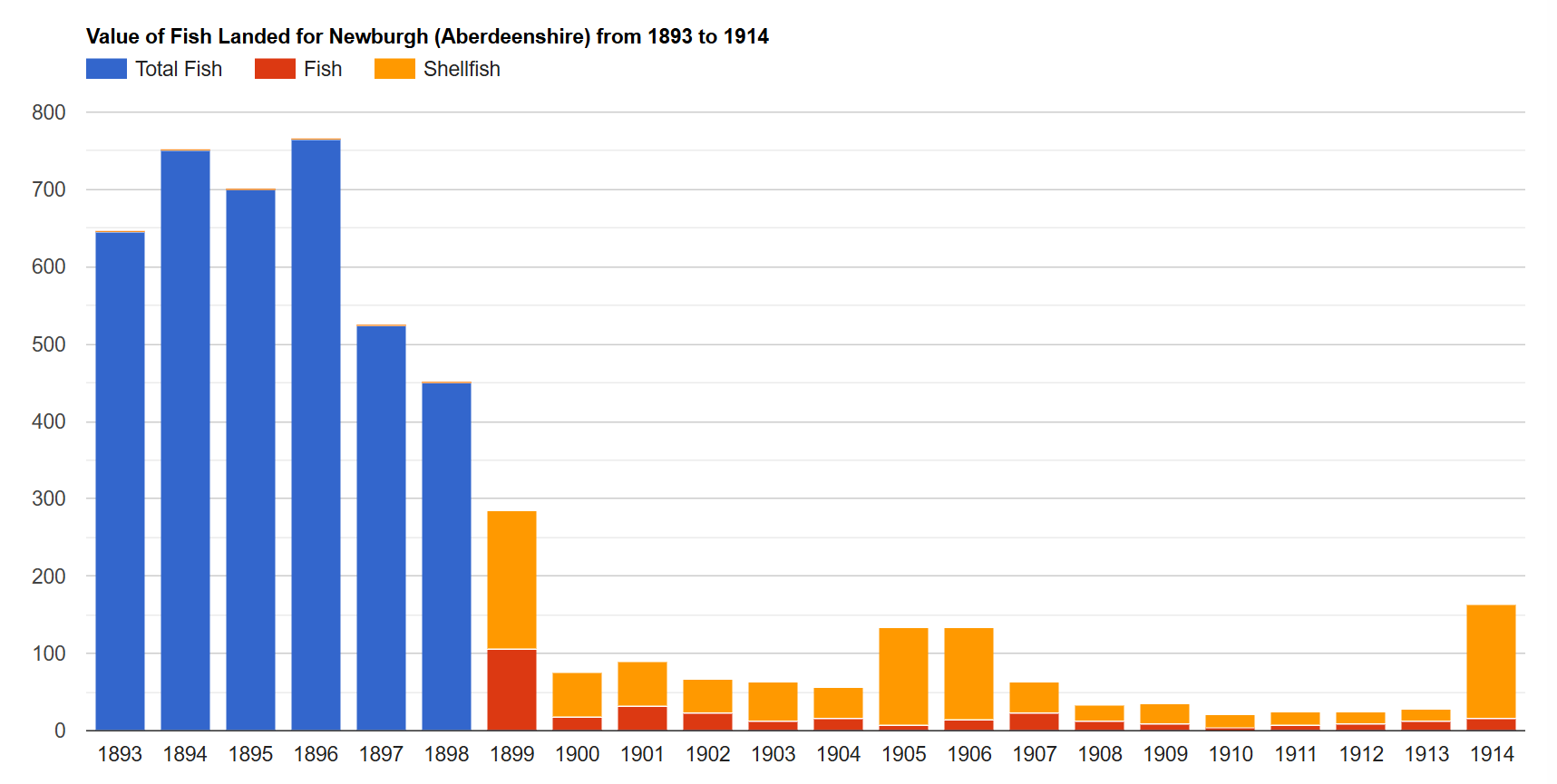
Value (£) of fish landed

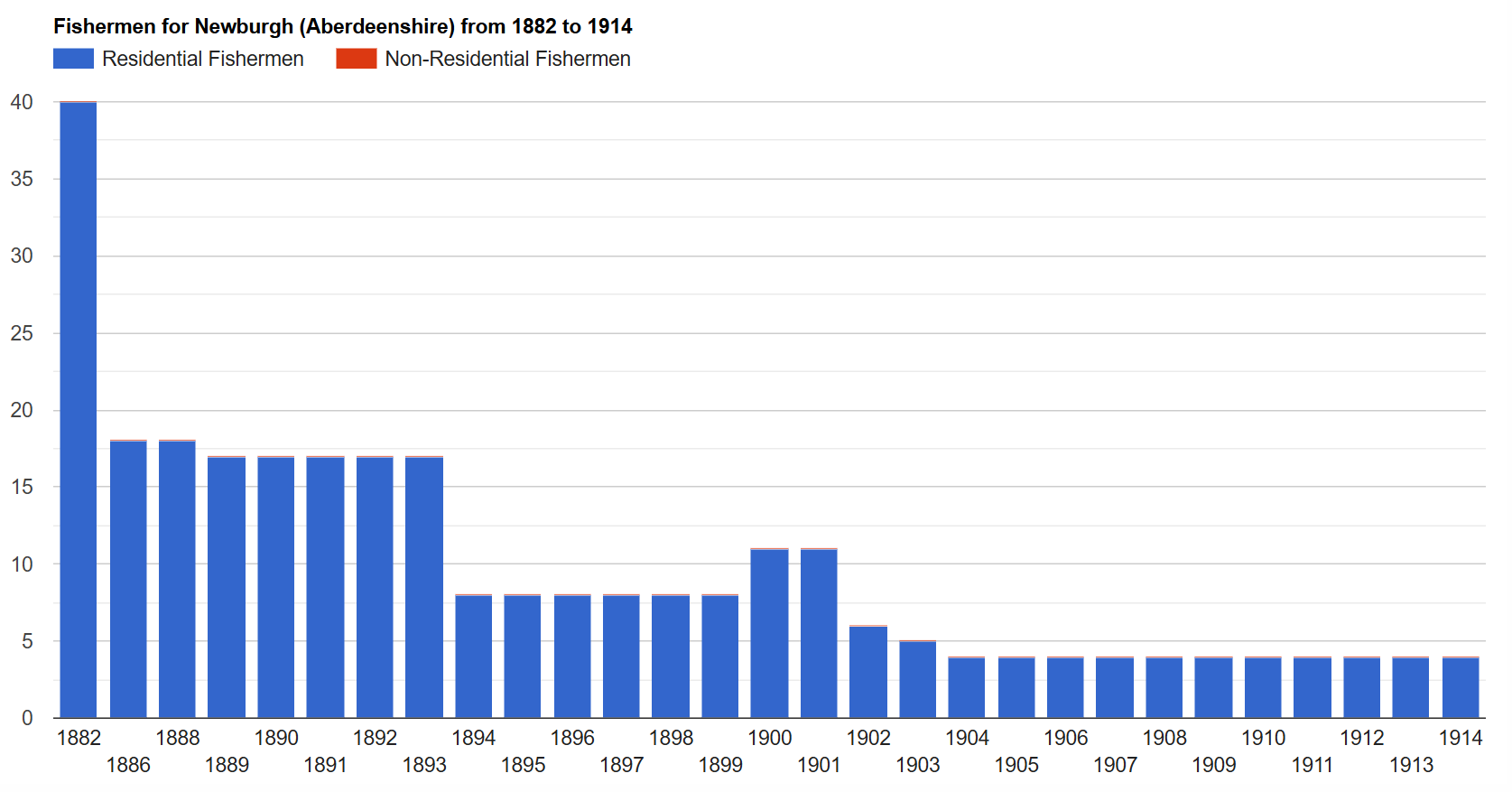
Fishermen

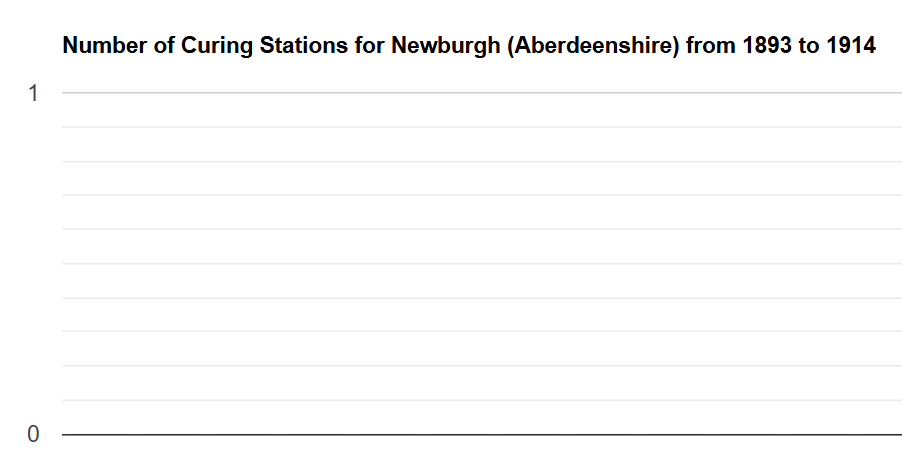
Placeholder - no curing stations

== Local information ==
Public transport, providing services to Aberdeen, Peterhead, Ellon and Dyce Airport, are presently run by Stagecoach North Scotland.

Education is served by Newburgh Mathers School, named after John Mathers, who, just before his death, left the residents of Newburgh enough money to set up a school in the local area for, as he put it, the education and clothing of twenty poor fishermen's sons of Newburgh. In terms of secondary education, Newburgh is within the catchment area for Ellon Academy.

The tallest point of Newburgh is the knoll Gallows Hill.

The police station in Newburgh no longer exists: in its place stands a house; however, the presence of a cell, in the past, is given away by the bars in one of the windows. Also, in the front of the house are the words police station engraved in the stone.

== Tourist attractions ==
The ruined Knockhall Castle is near Newburgh and was inhabited for a century by Clan Udny.

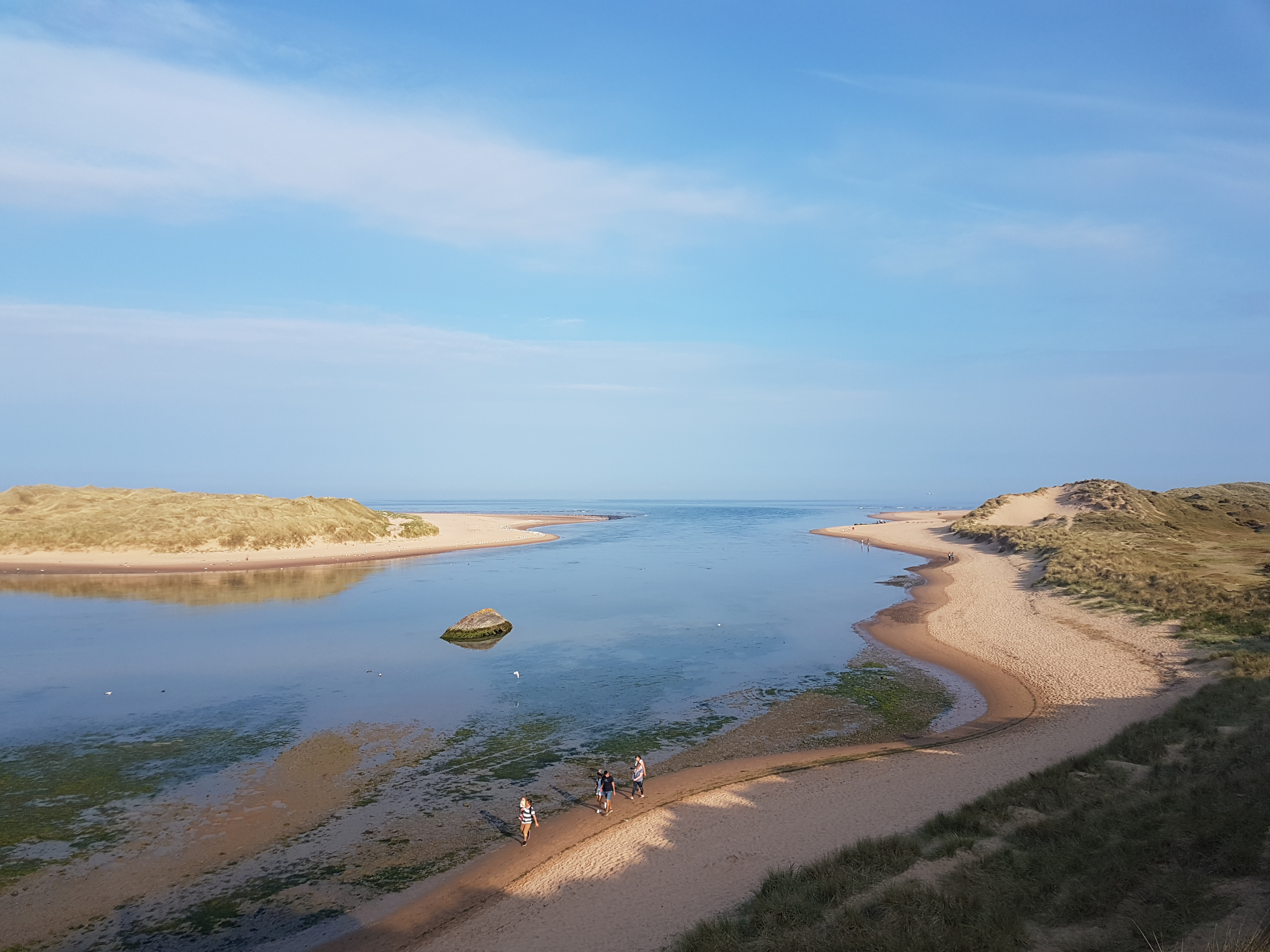
Newburgh beach

Coastal and country walks/cycling, bird watching, Sands of Forvie reserve, sea trout angling available. Newburgh on Ythan Golf Club, a links course. Wind/kite surfing in the area. Sand dunes and sandy beaches.
