= Meikle Loch =

Lake in Aberdeenshire, Scotland, UK

Coordinates: 57.367803°N 1.953272°W

Designations

Ramsar Wetland
- Official name: Ythan Estuary & Meikle Loch
- Designated: 30 March 1998
- Reference no.: 939

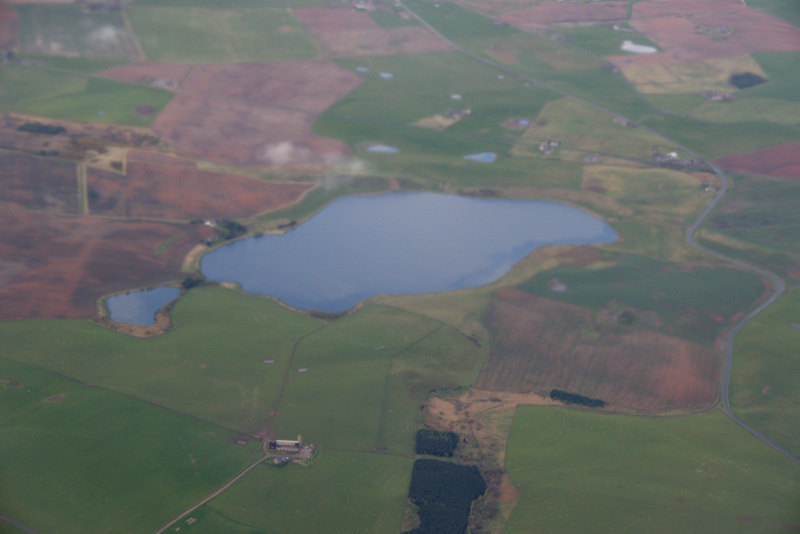
Meikle Loch from the air

Meikle Loch is an inland loch some miles north of Collieston, Aberdeenshire, Scotland. It is designated as part of the Ythan Estuary complex, along with the Sands of Forvie, as a Special Protection Area for wildlife conservation purposes. Meikle is a Scots word for large/big, which the loch is when compared to the adjacent Little Loch.

It is a eutrophic loch with limited aquatic vegetation but is important as a roost site for overwintering pink-footed geese. In summer, it forms part of a wider breeding area for three species of tern and supports areas of reedswamp vegetation.
