= Alexander Mann =

Scottish painter (1853–1908)

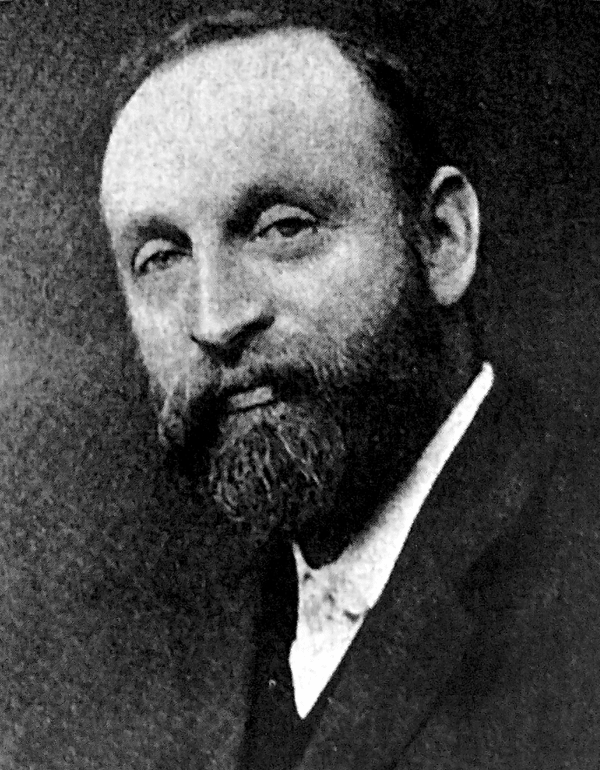
- Born: 1853
- Died: 1908 (aged 54–55)
- Known for: Painting

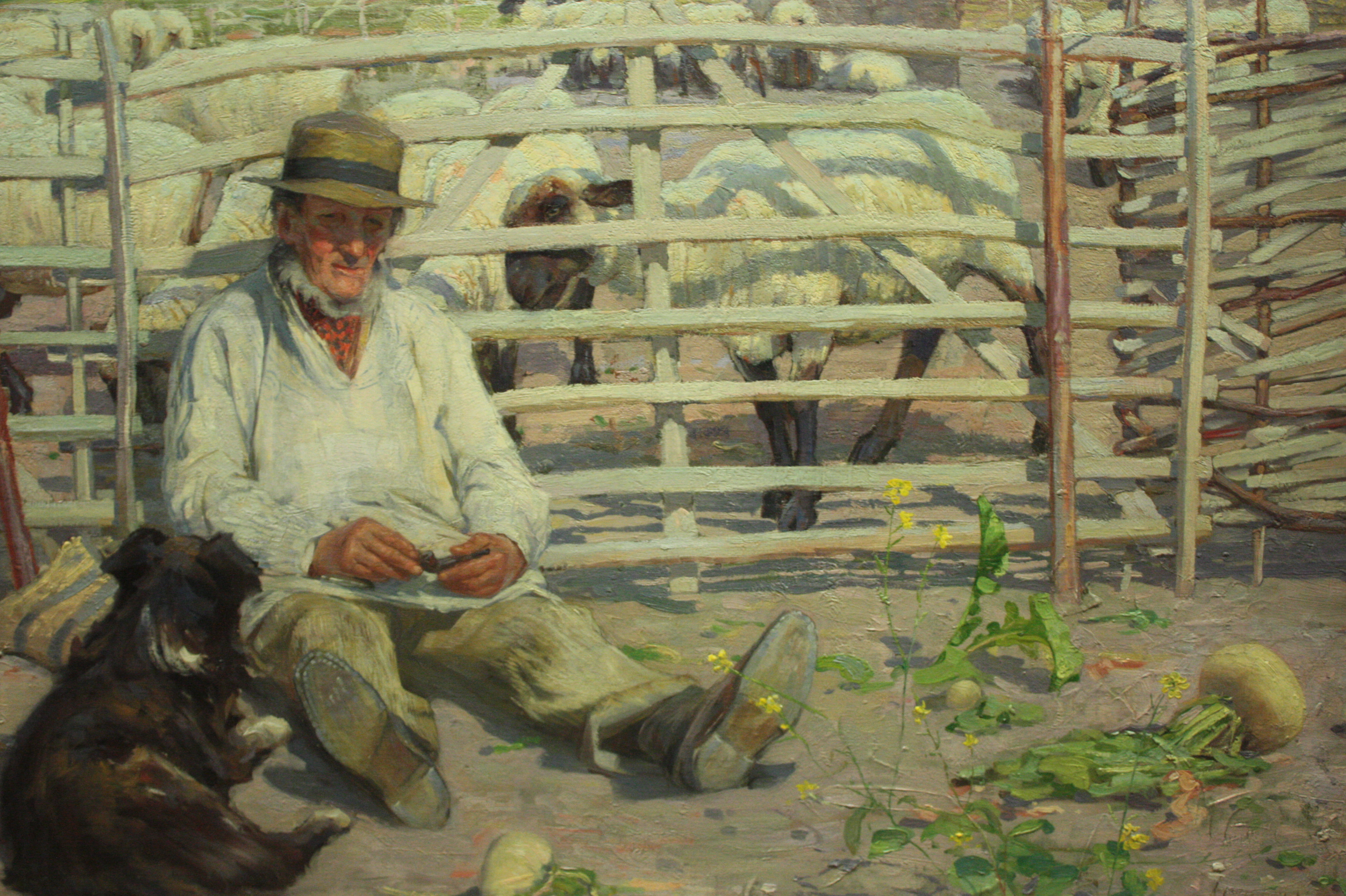
The Sheepfold by Alexander Mann

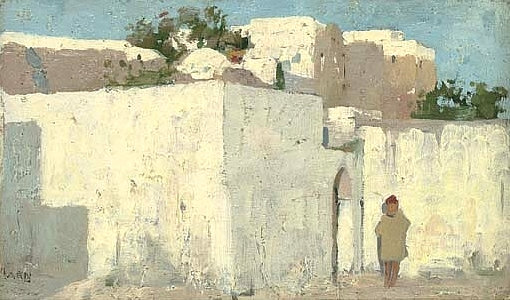
Alexander Mann painting

Alexander Mann (22 January 1853 – 26 January 1908) was a Scottish landscape and genre painter. He was a member of New English Art Club and Royal Institute of Oil Painters.

== Biography ==
Alexander Mann was born in Glasgow, Scotland on 22 January 1853. He died in London on 26 January 1908. He is buried in Blewbury Church, Oxfordshire.

The second son of James Mann, merchant and collector, he took drawing lessons from the age of ten with Robert Greenlees (1820–1894) and then attended evening classes at the Glasgow School of Art, where Greenlees was headmaster.

In 1877 he went to Paris and enrolled at the Académie Julian, and then studied under Mihály Munkácsy and from 1881 to 1885 under Carolus-Duran. From 1883 to 1893 Mann exhibited in London at the Royal Academy, Royal Institute of Oil Painters, Fine Art Society, New Gallery, Ridley Art Club, New English Art Club and Society of British Artists, a society that appointed James McNeill Whistler its president in 1886. At the same year he was invited to become the first Scottish member of the New English Art Club and was joined by several of his friends, notably John Lavery, Thomas Millie Dow of the Glasgow Boys and Norman Garstin.

Influenced by the Hague school and by Jules Bastien-Lepage, his picture A Bead Stringer, Venice gained an honourable mention at the Salon in 1885. After a public controversy over this painting when it was exhibited at the Royal Glasgow Institute, Mann settled in England, at West Hagbourne, Berkshire, and later in the neighbouring village of Blewbury, where he painted a series of views of the Downs and portraits of country people. Mann travelled extensively in Britain, paying several visits to the coast in Angus and Fife, and to Walberswick, Suffolk.

His travels also covered Europe and the Americas. A visit to Venice in 1884 was Mann's first artistic venture beyond Britain and the immediate environs of Paris; this was followed by a voyage to the Caribbean and the Southern States of America, perhaps inspired by American artist friend in Paris. From 1890 to 1892 he lived with his family in Tangiers. Later he travelled to Madrid through Southern Spain in 1892 accompanied by John Lavery, another alumnus of the Académie Julian.

He recorded his visits and ideas for studio compositions in sketchbooks, using photography as well to assist his memory of a subject. In 1895 Mann's work was exhibited in London at the Barbican and in Dublin at the Hugh Lane Municipal Gallery of Modern Art. But he preferred to "live away from the haunts of other artists" because the relative prosperity which he owed to his family made it unnecessary to pay much attention to exhibition institutions, patrons and dealers.

In 1893 he was elected a member of the Royal Institute of Oil Painters. Today he is regarded as one of the Glasgow Boys, although he was never an active member.

== Artistic style ==
Mann owed his drawing skills to Rodolphe Julien who regarded the study of the live model as indispensable to those who desired skilled draughtsmanship. However, his painterly techniques was required from Mihály Munkácsy although the apprenticeship with him didn't last long due to some incompatibility of temperament. Through Carolus Duran, Mann learned the importance of tonal values for the purpose of self-expression, which had been shown in some of his early figure paintings, such as Artificial Flower Workers and The Tapestry Workers.

Mann preferred the arcadia of the countryside. He painted gleaners, faggot gatherers, hop pickers and sheepfolds. Mann was also greatly attracted by the stillness of the deserted slow-moving waterways of rural England; the Alde and the Dorset Avon, beloved by many Scottish artists of the period. Another recurring subject is that of the children whether playing on the beach or asleep in the sun. His travelling led to paintings of Orientalist subjects such as some Arabian portraits or Tangier beach scenes.

From his early training in Glasgow, his early works followed the traditional Victorian landscape style, evoking a sense of prosaic naturalism and romanticism. Typical works include By the Findhorn, Morayshire and Sheepfold. Later, he moved to a much lighter palette. However his handling continued to be restrained, and for all the brilliant of his color, a respect of Corot-esque tonality was retained. Typical works include Tangiers scenes and some haystacks studies.
