= Ythan Estuary =

Estuary in Aberdeenshire, Scotland

Coordinates: 57°20′30″N 01°57′30″W

Designations

Ramsar Wetland
- Official name: Ythan Estuary & Meikle Loch
- Designated: 30 March 1998
- Reference no.: 939

The Ythan Estuary, Forvie National Nature Reserve, Aberdeenshire, Scotland.

The Ythan Estuary is the tidal component of the Ythan River, emptying into the North Sea 19 kilometres (12 mi) north of Aberdeen, Scotland. The estuary's tidal action extends 7 kilometres (4.3 mi) inland and has characteristic widths of between 250 metres (820 ft) and 780 metres (2,560 ft). Besides the tidal channel there are interfaces to the upland dunes including mudflats, sand beaches and shingle flats. Reaches of salt marsh occur, but they are primarily near the Waterside Bridge (crossing of the A975 road) and the mouth of the Tarty Burn, a small tributary river. The moorland bordering the east of the Ythan River near its mouth has been described as the most significant area of coastal moorland in northern Britain.

The Ythan Estuary is a designated Site of Special Scientific Interest (SSSI) along with the Sands of Forvie and forms part of the Ramsar site "Ythan Estuary & Meikle Loch" (site no. 939). There are 50 breeding pairs of common shelducks in the estuary, and there is a mixed tern breeding colony on the east shore 1 kilometre (3,300 ft) from the mouth comprising Arctic, Sandwich, little and common terns. Leisure activities including birdwatching, fishing, canoeing and wildfowling are permitted. There are hides to watch waders (best at low tide), and a wildfowling code of conduct with a voluntary refuge area south of the main bridge over the estuary (A975). Visitors can fish for estuarine species such as flounder for free but are advised not to disturb birds during the breeding season. Game fisher's catching salmon and sea trout is by permit only.

== Topography and geometry ==
North of the estuary mouth extend the Sands of Forvie, an extensive sand dune system that has been shown to contain evidence of Stone Age settlement. Some of the dunes north of the estuary rise to a height of about 80 metres (260 ft) and the lower ones to the south of the estuary rise to about 50 metres (160 ft) in height. Proceeding from the mouth the estuary inland, there are initially beach sands at the margin, thence shingle beach and mudflats. Quickly, by the time of reaching the first roadway bridge crossing about 1,300 metres (4,300 ft) up the estuary, there are mussel beds and marshy areas.

At its widest point the Ythan Estuary is approximately 780 metres (2,560 ft) wide. The verges of the upper reaches range from extensive mudflats to marsh and fen. Further upstream is a small island known as Geck Island (grid reference NJ999278) inaccessible to waders even at low tide, and which is a haven for cormorants. The broader landscape drained by the Ythan near the coast is a generally mild sloping farmland known as the Buchan plain, which is virtually devoid of trees. In the glacial era, the Ythan River at this point would have been a torrent of melt waters streaming down from the Scottish Highlands.

== Archaeology ==
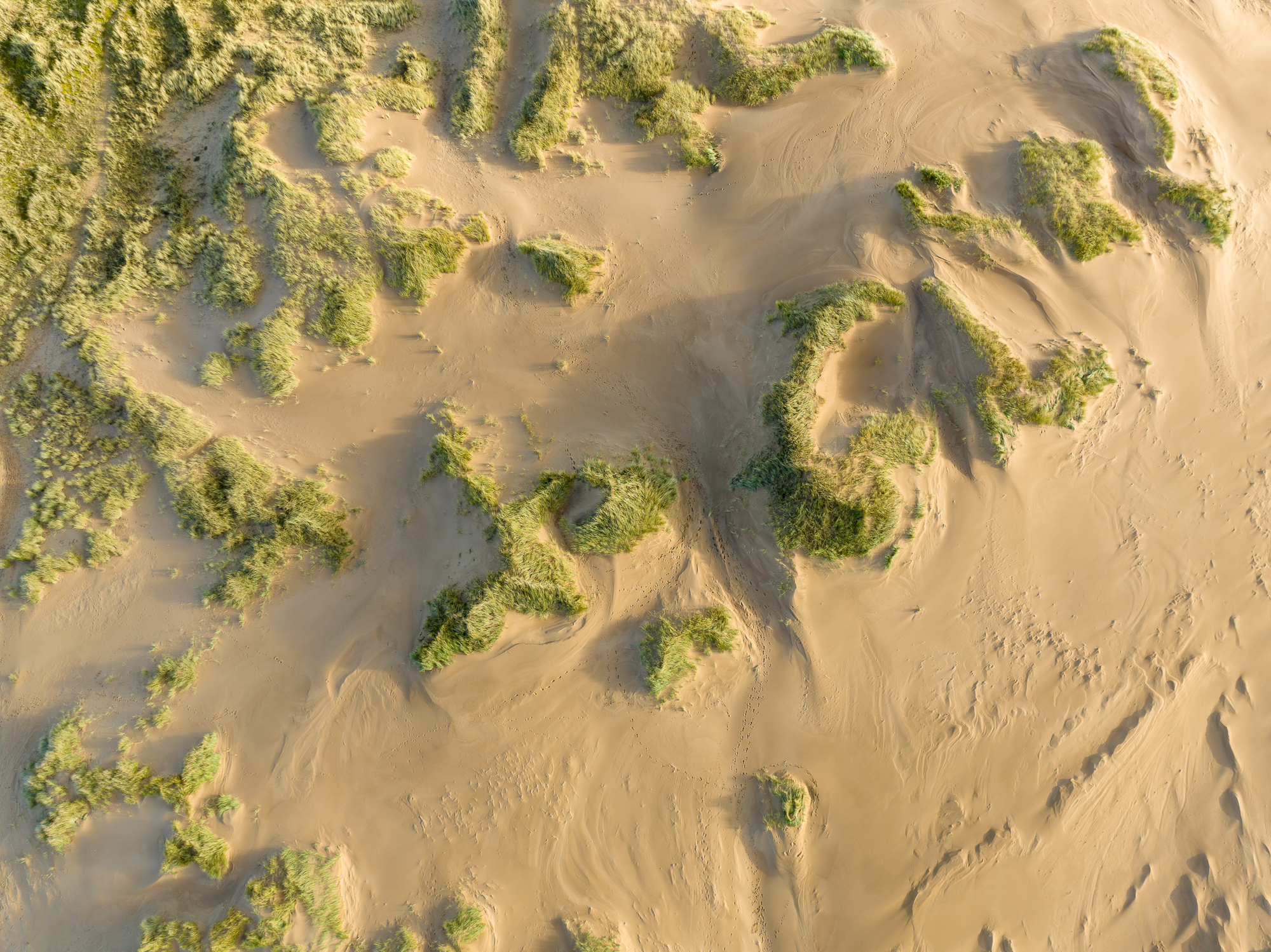
The Sands of Forvie, Forvie National Nature Reserve, Aberdeenshire, Scotland.

Prehistoric man had settlements in coastal estuaries along the northeast Scottish coast including the nearby River Don Estuary and the Ythan Estuary. Studies date the lithics recovered at least as early as 7000 BC, with most of the artefacts from the Ythan mouth area deriving from the Sands of Forvie. Most of the large collection of lithics was retrieved in the period 1994-2001 from a deflation surface within this active dune system. The excavations revealed the survival of superimposed land surfaces, whose layers revealed hearth structures and other characteristic mesolithic artefacts. Although no Viking artefacts have been recovered here, a few kilometres north along the coast is the only place name associated with Viking landings, Saint Olaf at Cruden Bay.

== Ecology ==
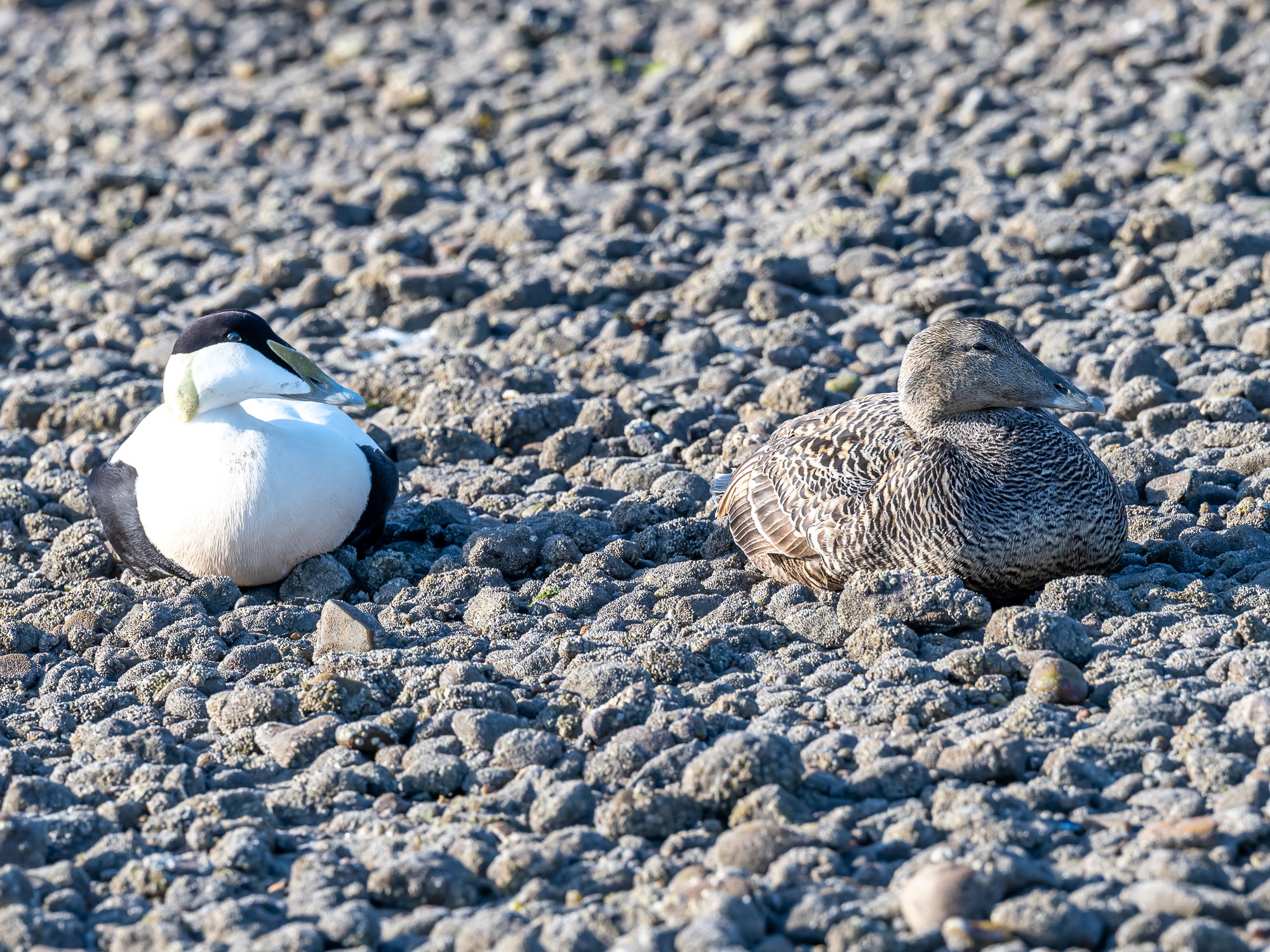
Common Eiders, The Ythan Estuary, Forvie National Nature Reserve, Aberdeenshire, Scotland.

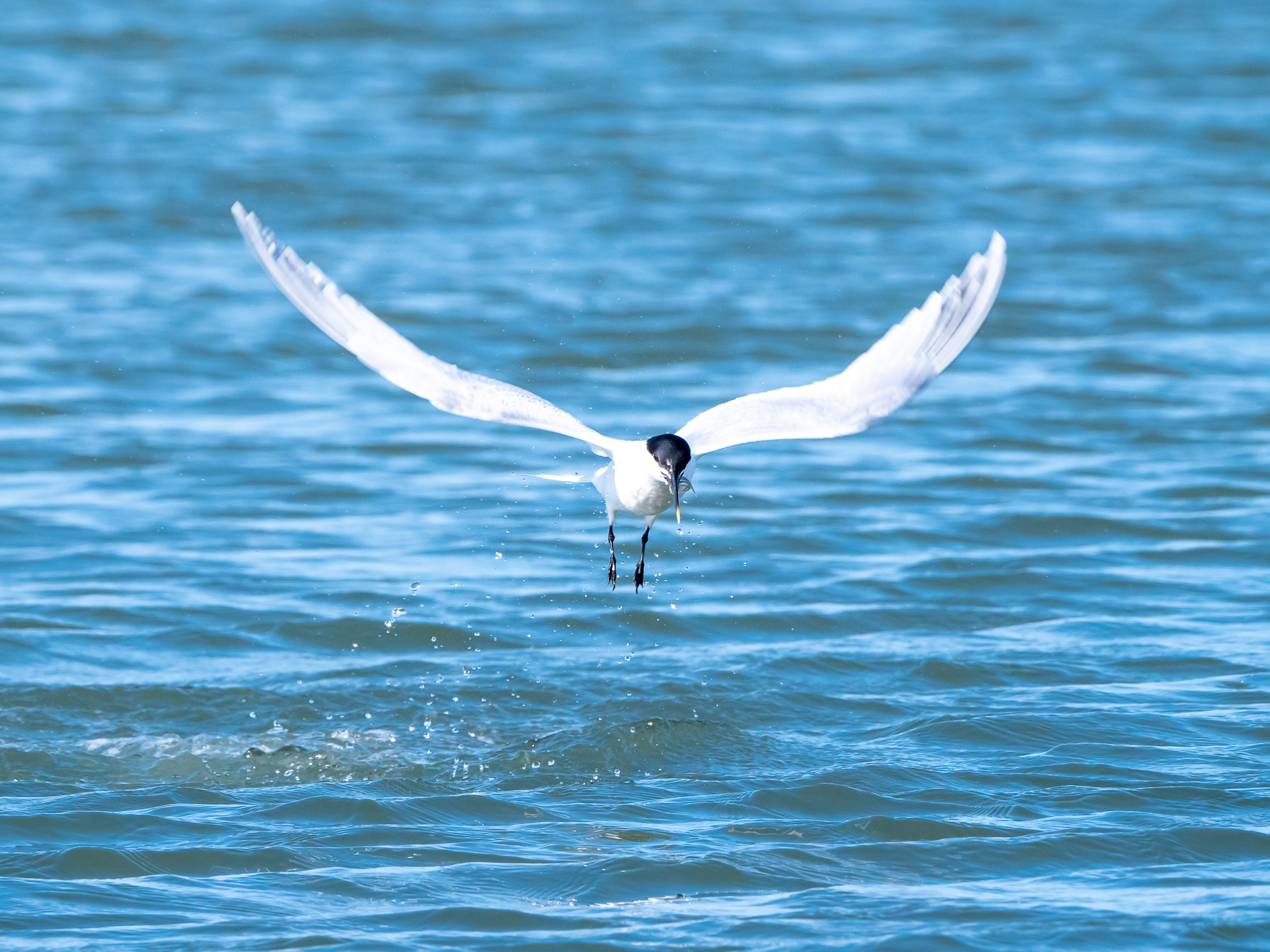
Sandwich Tern, The Ythan Estuary, Forvie National Nature Reserve, Aberdeenshire, Scotland.

There are several distinct habitats within the Ythan Estuary complex including marsh, littoral, estuarine, lacustrine and dunes. Thus there is an unusual diversity of flora and fauna present in this nature reserve. The estuary itself is tidal, located seven kilometres from the North Sea. In the estuary and its verges, the presence of tern colonies is notable, since there are several distinct species that utilize the north banks of the Ythan Estuary, and comprise a percentage of the breeding pairs of terns in the United Kingdom. In the summer terns can be observed feeding in their characteristic diving patterns approximately 600 to 900 metres inland from the estuary.

At the river mouth species of birds include scaup, long-tailed duck, red-breasted merganser and velvet scoter. In lesser numbers guillemot and razorbills are occasionally seen at this outlet to the North Sea. Extensive mussel beds are found about three kilometres from the estuary mouth, and these provide food for common eider (with the occasional king eider, oystercatchers and turnstones). On the Forvie Moor element of the Ythan Estuary complex, both mute and whooper swans occur. Meikle Loch is an element of the Ythan Estuary complex and sustains some aquatic vegetation, and from November to March is home to many wading birds, ducks and geese.

== Conservation status ==
The site is classified as a Special Protection Area (SPA) under the European Union Birds Directive, supporting bird populations of European importance. The component landforms which are considered elements of the SPA or SSSI are the estuary itself, the dunes to the east known as the Sands of Forvie, Meikle Loch and the adjacent Kippet Hills. The SPA (code UK9002221) was classified on 30 March 1998.

The Ythan Estuary complex supports the following nationally important bird populations during the breeding season:

- Common tern Sterna hirundo, 265 pairs representing up to 2.2% of the breeding population in Great Britain.
- Little tern Sterna albifrons, 41 pairs representing up to 1.7% of the total breeding population in Great Britain
- Sandwich tern Sterna sandvicensis, 600 pairs representing up to 4.3% of the breeding population in Great Britain

The site also supports the following wintering migratory population of European importance:

- Pink-footed goose Anser brachyrhynchus, 17,213 individuals representing up to 7.7% of the wintering Eastern Greenland/Iceland/United Kingdom population

== See also ==
- Fowlsheugh
- Wetland
- Important bird area
