= Forvie National Nature Reserve =

Nature reserve in Aberdeenshire, Scotland

- IUCN category II (national park)
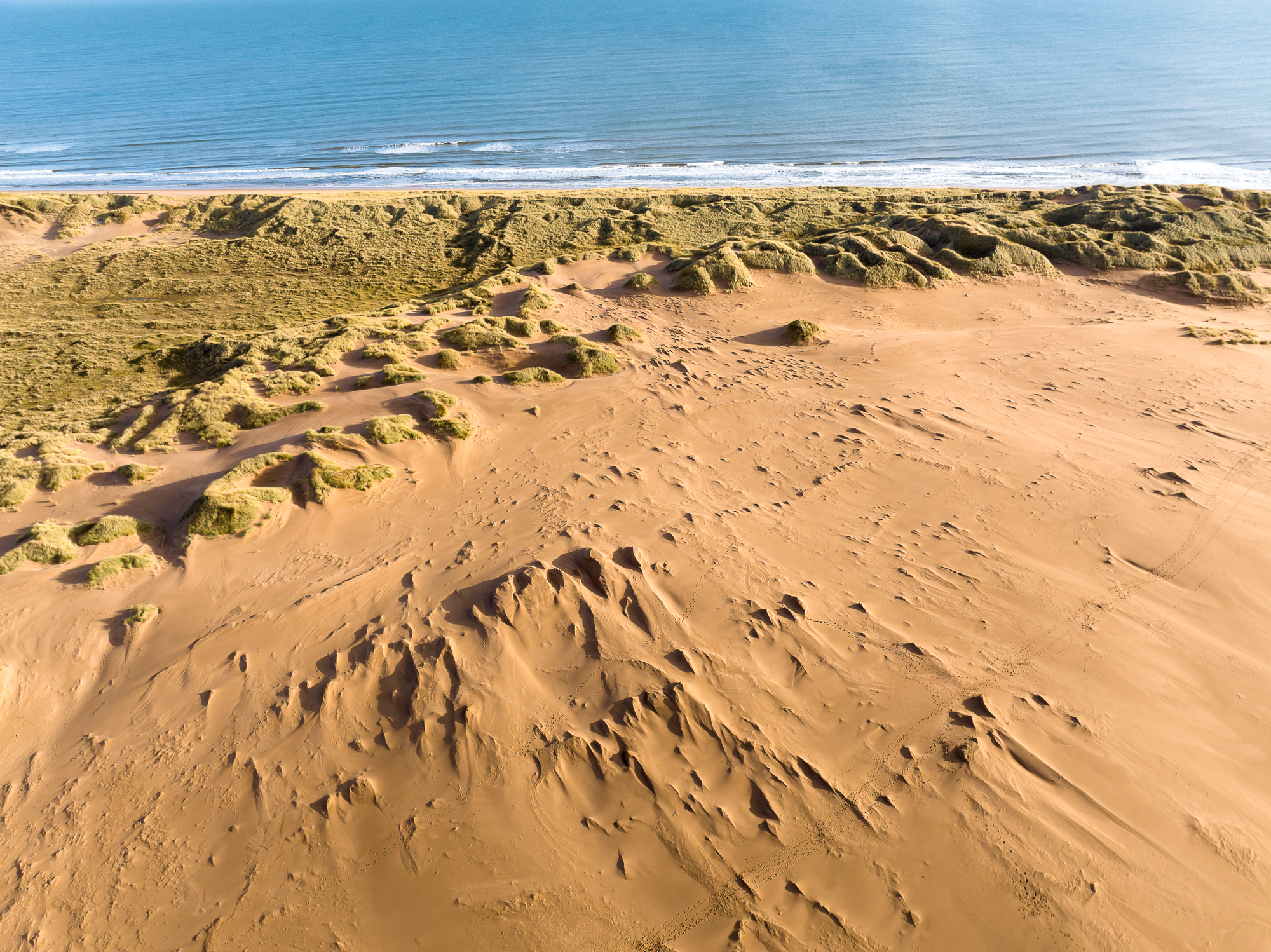

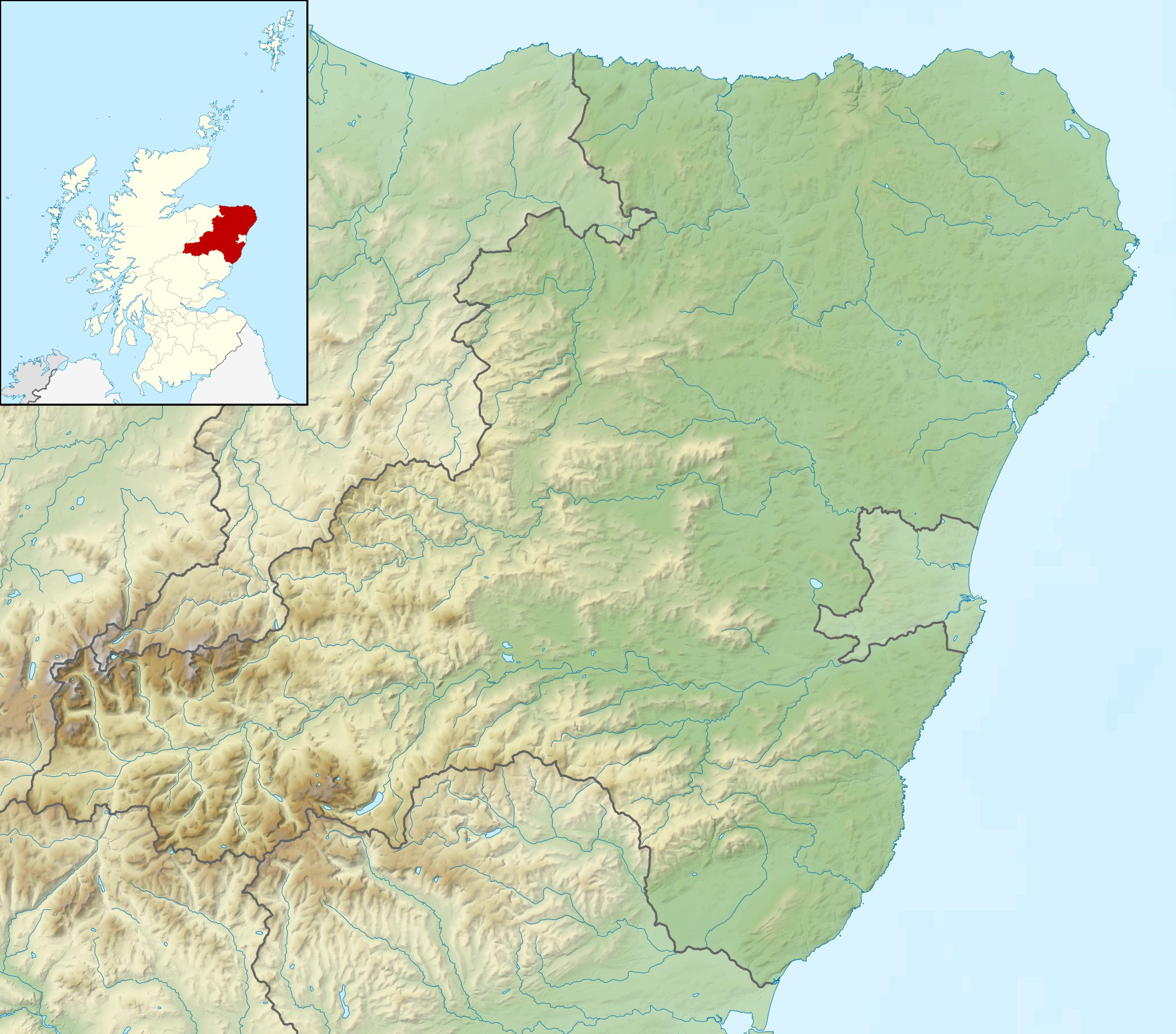
- Location within Aberdeenshire
- Location: Newburgh, Aberdeenshire, Scotland
- Coordinates: 57°18′43″N 1°59′10″W
- Area: 973 ha (2,400 acres)
- Established: 1959
- Governing body: NatureScot
- Website: Forvie National Nature Reserve

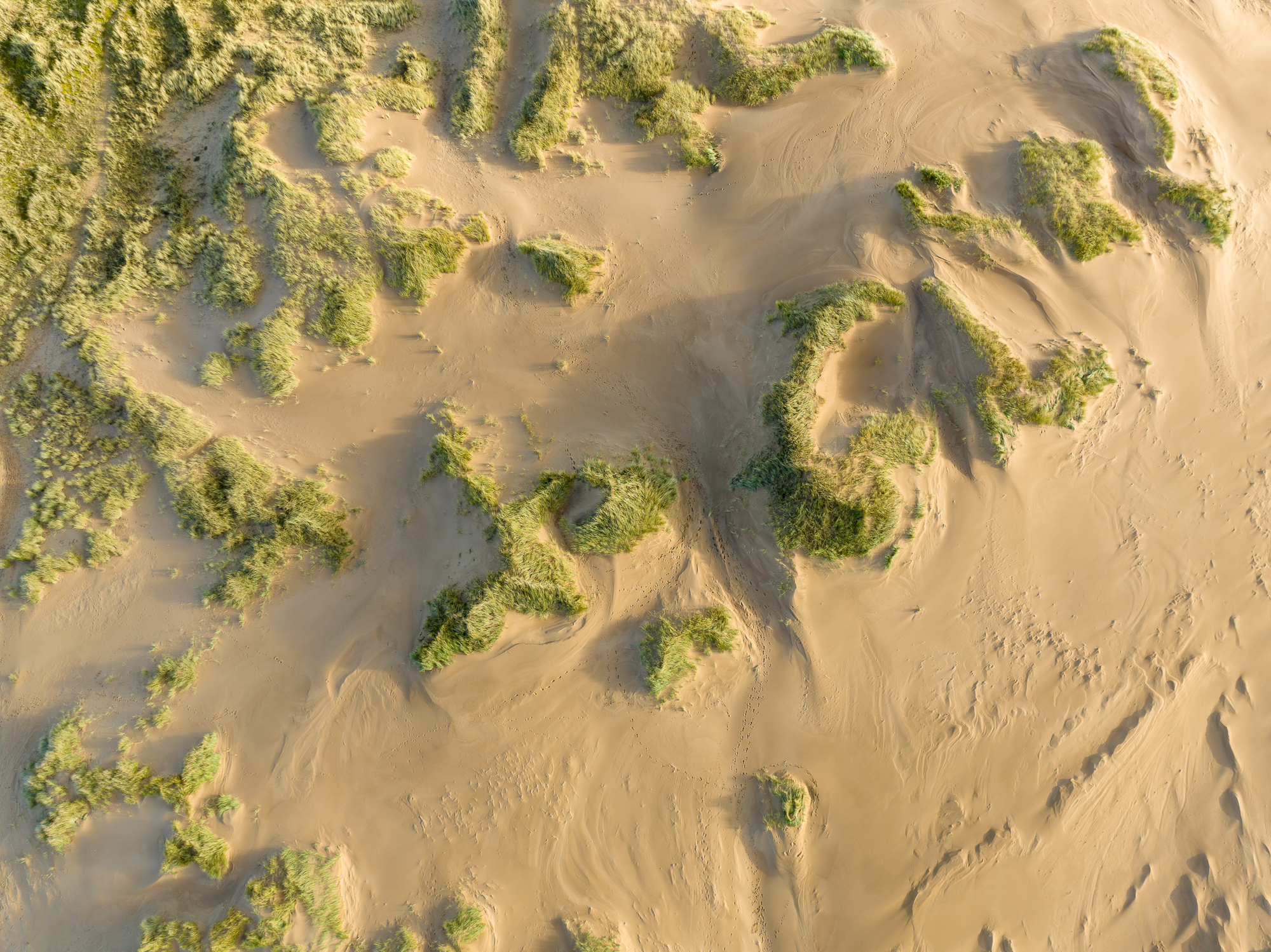
The Sands of Forvie

The Forvie National Nature Reserve is a national nature reserve owned and managed by NatureScot. It is located north of Newburgh in Aberdeenshire, in the northeast of Scotland. The reserve includes the Sands of Forvie, which are the fifth largest sand dune system in Britain, and the least disturbed by human activity. The dune system is an integral part of the Ythan Estuary, which also forms part of the reserve, and separates the sands from Balmedie beach.

The reserve contained at one point the largest breeding colony of breeding common eider in Britain and while they are still a protected feature of the reserve the eider colony suffered dramatic losses starting in 2006 and the subsequent years. The reserve also hosts an internationally important ternery and a protected seal haul-out containing both common seals and grey seals, predominantly the latter.

The area is designated as a both a Special Protection Area and a Special Area of Conservation under the Natura 2000 scheme, as well as being a Site of Special Scientific Interest. The site is designated a Category II protected area by the International Union for Conservation of Nature.

The sands were the site of the village of Forvie that was abandoned due to drifting sands.

== Sands of Forvie ==
The Sands of Forvie are one of the largest areas of blown sand in Scotland. The sand at Forvie is formed from the remains of sediment that was transported by rivers to the coast at the end of the last ice age. The sediment settled in the sea, but was gradually washed onshore by the action of waves and wind.

The sand dunes at Forvie can be divided into three distinct parts. The southernmost point of the reserve consists of a sand spit at the point where the River Ythan enters the sea. To the north the sand rests on raised beaches terraces and glaciated rocks. North of this region is an area where the sand lies on top of a rock plateau, with glacial deposits of varying depths sandwiched between the rock and the sand. The dunes are highly mobile, and can reach up to 20 metres (66 ft) in height. As there is relatively little plant life on these mobile dunes, they have been likened to the Sahara Desert.

== Flora and fauna ==
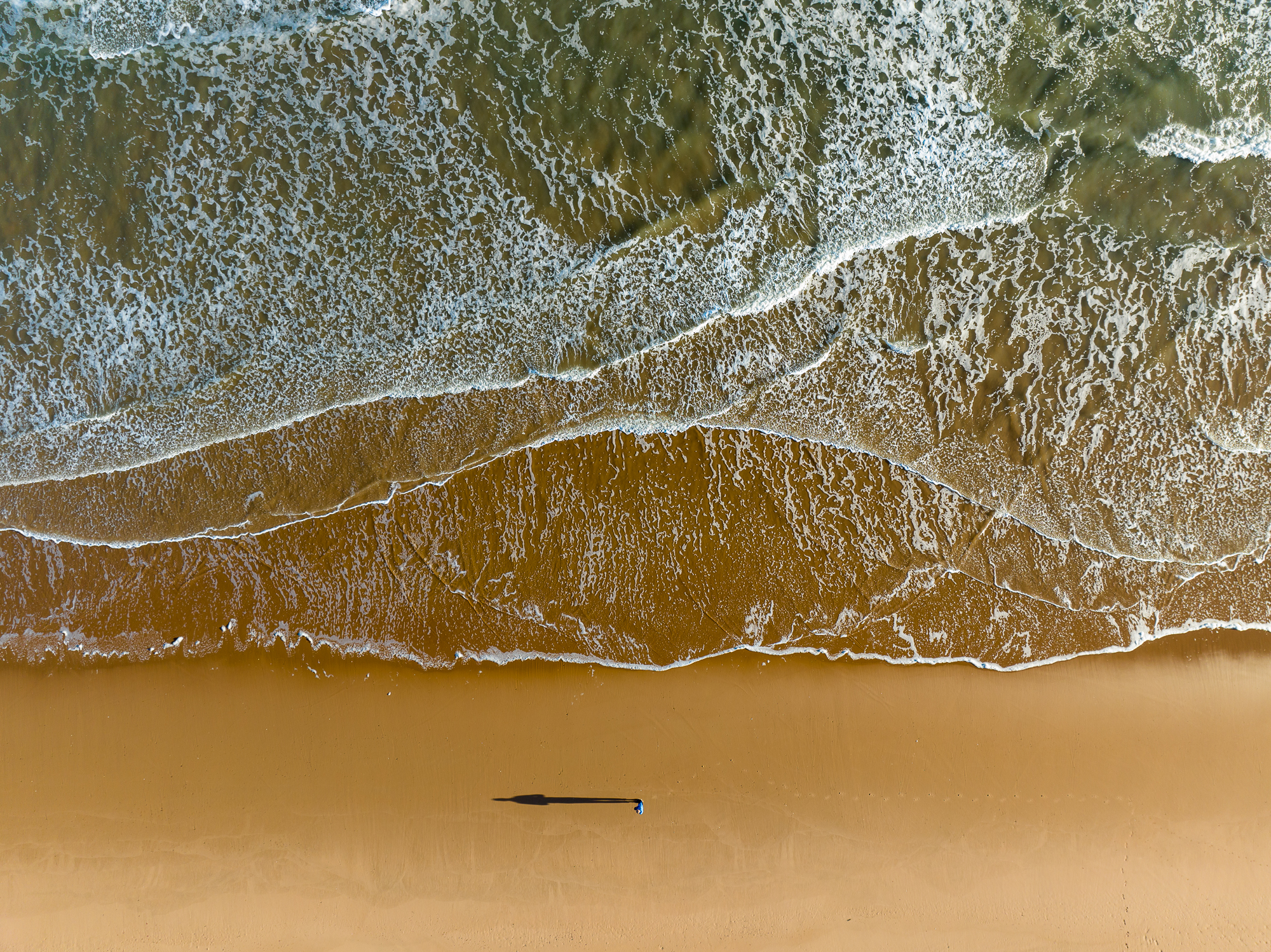
A view of the beach in Forvie National Nature Reserve

The reserve contains large areas of sandy foreshore, mobile and fixed dunes, dune pasture and lowland heath and the successional development of vegetation. The sand dunes are of various stages of evolution and contain plethora of plant species including marram grass (Ammophila arenaria), red fescue, (Festuca rubra), crowberry, (Empetrum nigrum), the cross-leaved heath (Erica tetralix), common sedge, (Carex nigra), marsh pennywort (Hydrocotyle vulgaris) and the invasive creeping willow (Salix repens ssp. argentea). Vascular plants are an identified and protected feature of the reserve under the Sands of Forvie and Ythan Estuary SSSI. 15 species are identified on reserve with 10 of which are red book listed species (Astragalus danicus, Carex maritima, Coeloglossum viride, Corollarhiza trifida, Gentianella campestris, Platanthera bifolia, Salsola kali, Mertensia maritima, Radiola linoides and Teesdalia nudicaulis) and five of which are classified as UK scarce species (Equisetum variegatum, Festuca arenaria, Ophioglossum azoricum, Potamogeton filiformis, Puccinellia distans).

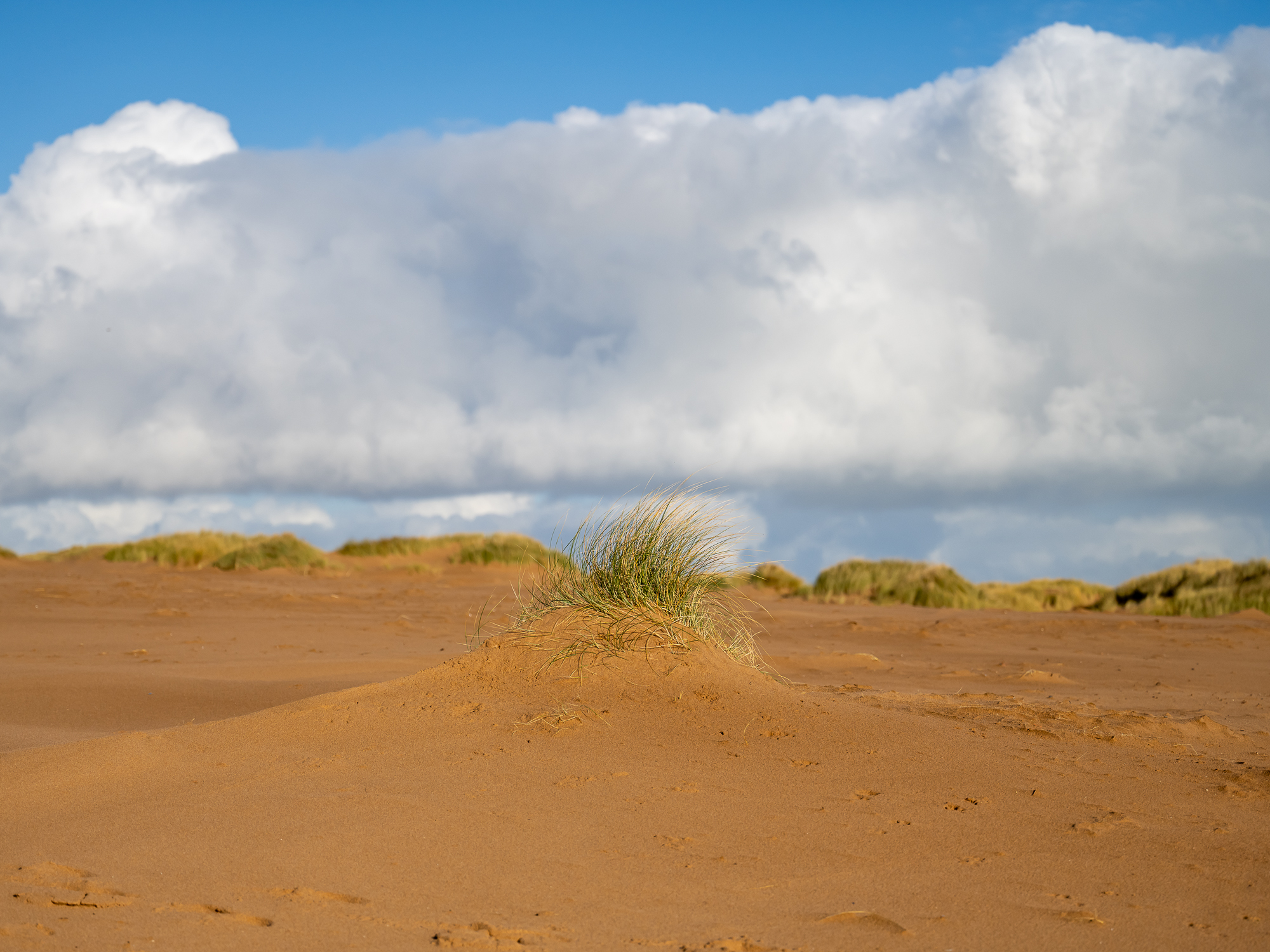
European marram grass in Forvie National Nature Reserve

Four species of tern breed at Forvie, building their nests among the dunes and on the beach. Little terns and arctic terns favour the foreshore and raised beaches, while the sandwich terns and common terns nest amongst the marram tussocks of the dune system. The breeding success of the terns has fluctuated widely over the years, and since 1995 NatureScot have undertaken selected culling of predating species, specifically crows, gulls and foxes. In addition to culling, NatureScot have also trialled the use of decoy terns to attract little terns into the areas protected from foxes by fences, as well as providing artificial shelters for tern chicks to use to avoid crows and gulls. In recent years the colonies of sandwich tern and black headed gulls have had great success in breeding with some of the highest populations recorded to date in 2019.

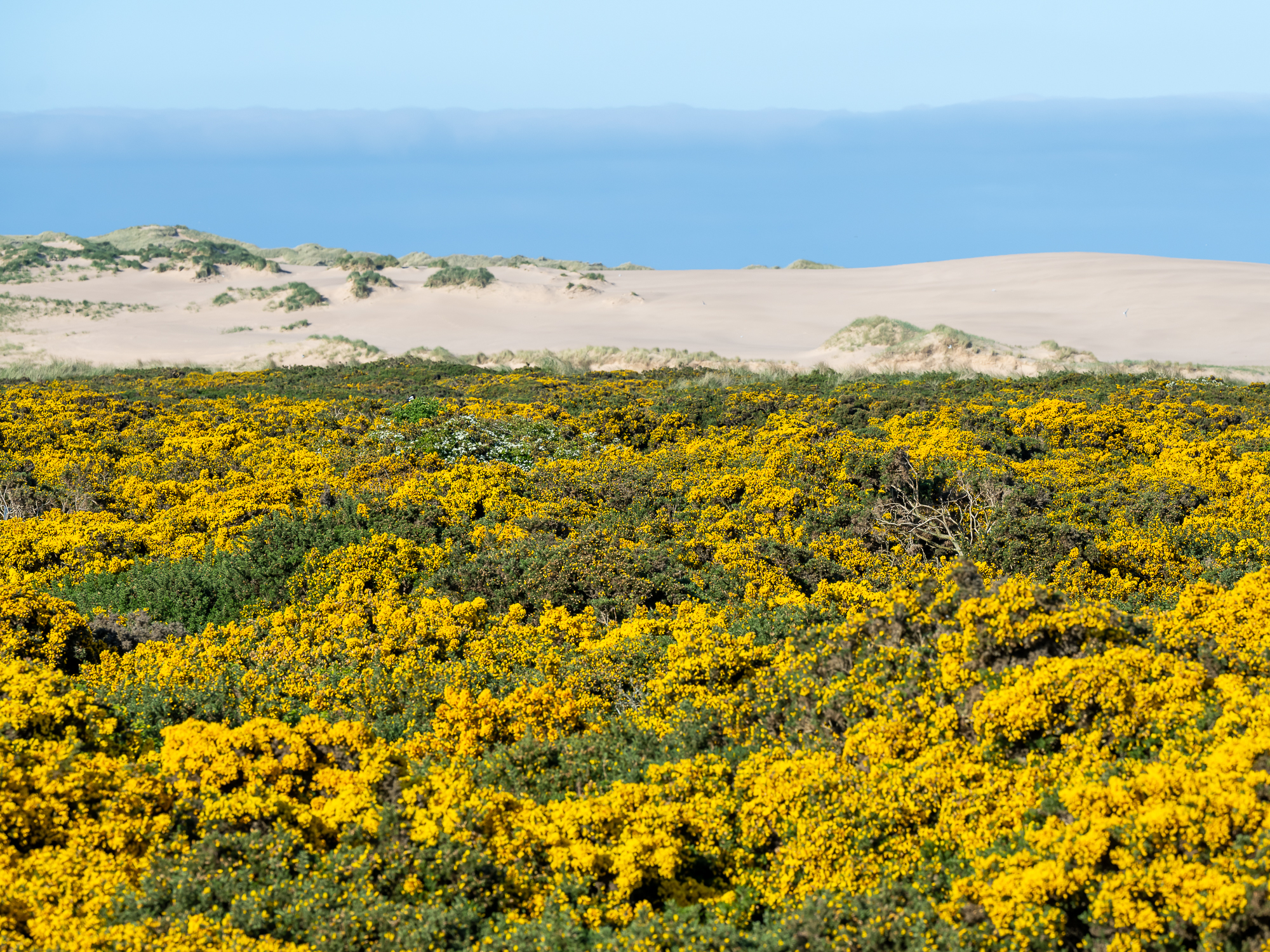
Common gorse in Forvie National Nature Reserve

The mudflats of the estuary provide an important wintering ground for migratory birds such as wigeon, oystercatcher, golden plover, lapwing, dunlin, curlew and redshank, and around 15,000 geese may be seen on the estuary each spring. The reserve hosts a population of protected breeding eider that spend the breeding season on reserve, with many heading to the Tay estuary for the winter, although there is also a smaller population that remains year-round. In 2005 the reserve held a population of over 5000 eiders but has since suffered losses and in 2019 recorded a spring peak of 1323 eiders.

The cliffs in the northern part of the reserve host breeding colonies of many seabirds, including northern fulmar, shag, cormorant, kittiwake and razorbill. Raptor species such as short-eared owls, kestrel, sparrowhawk, osprey and buzzard are also regularly seen, and in total 255 species of bird have been recorded at Forvie.

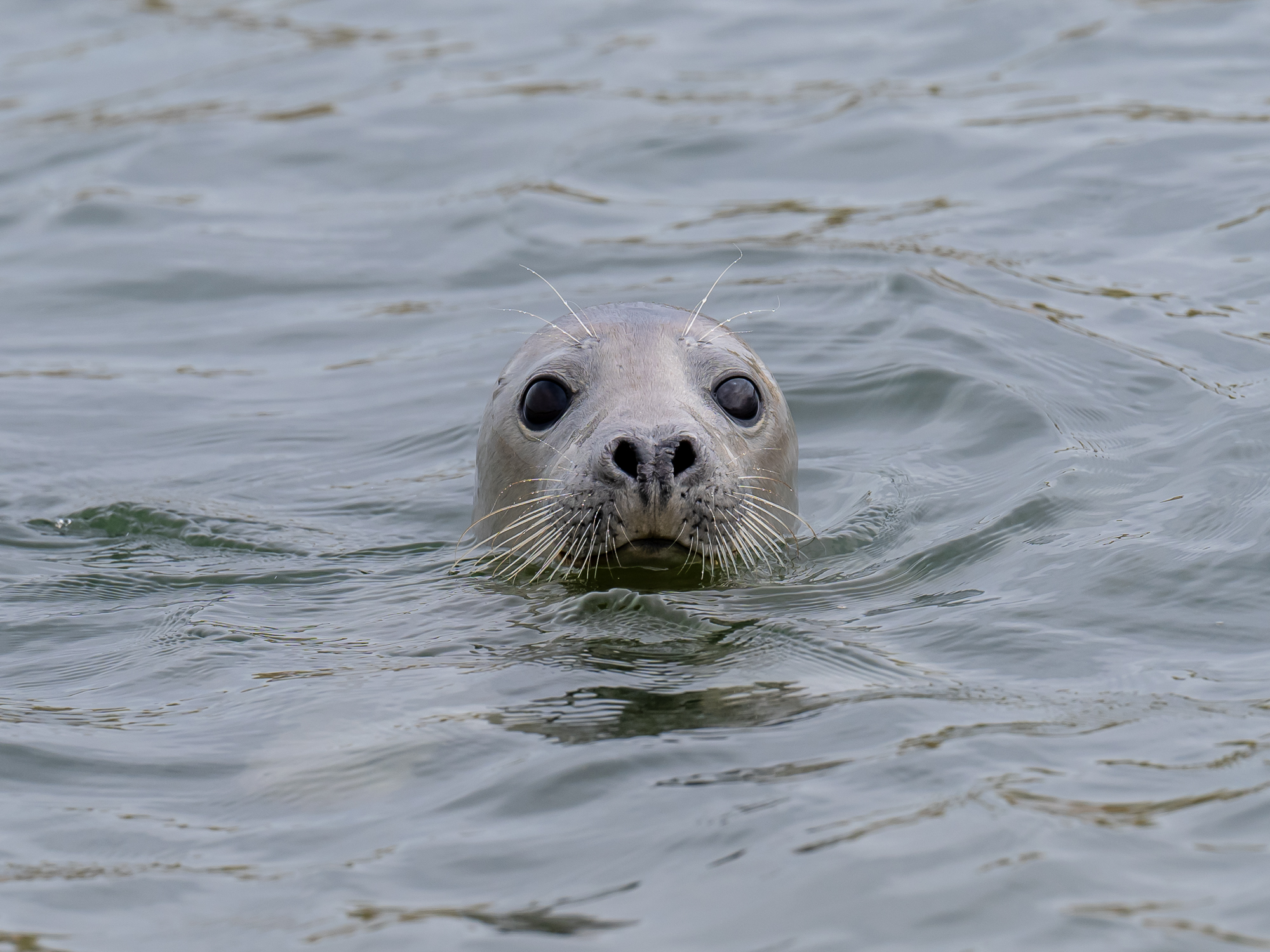
A grey seal in the North Sea near Forvie National Nature Reserve

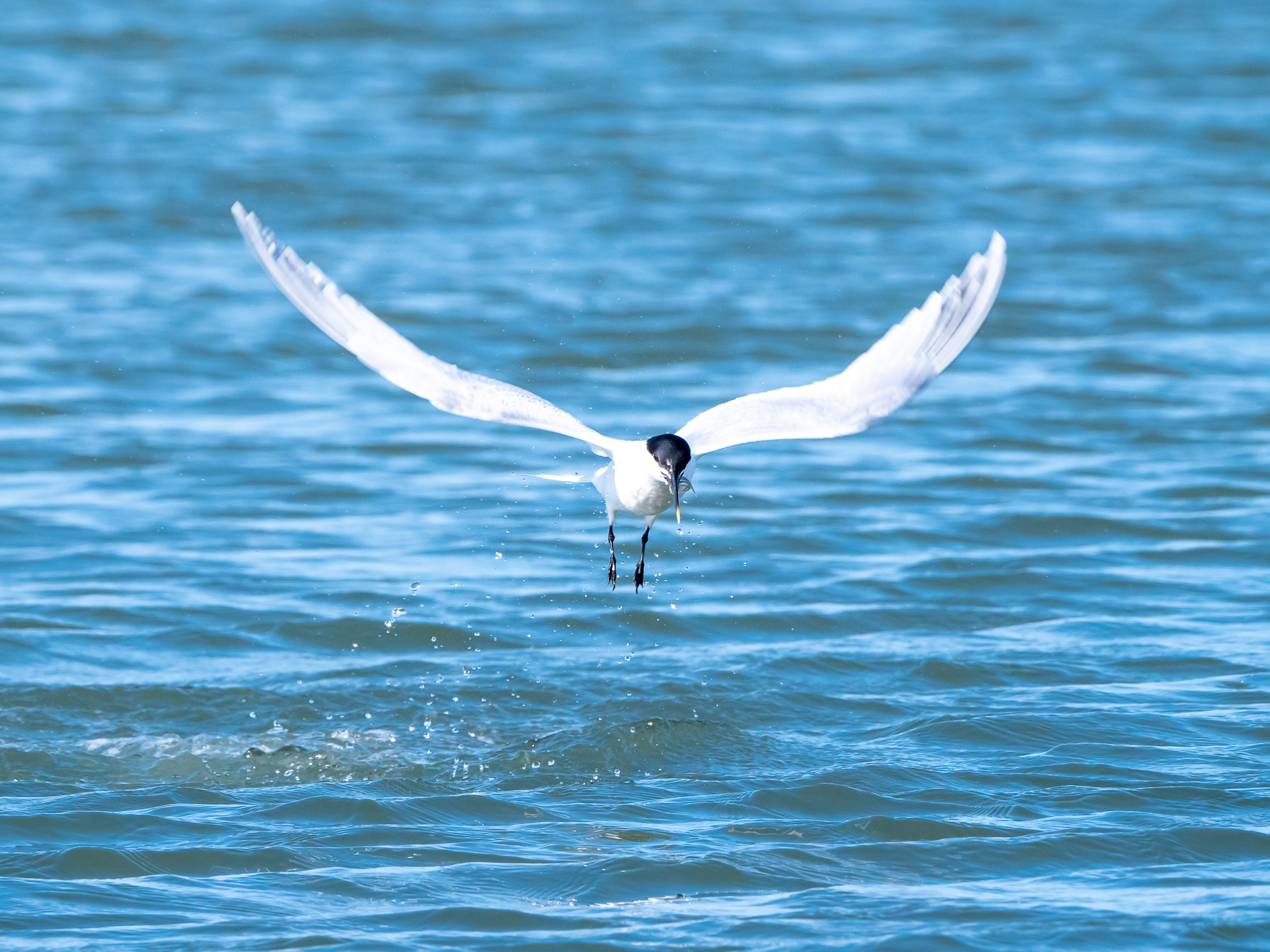
A sandwich tern near the Ythan Estuary in Forvie National Nature Reserve

Forvie is a popular site for viewing grey and harbour seals, which haul out onto beaches and mudflats at the mouth of the Ythan estuary. The Protection of Seals (Designated Sea Haul-out Sites) (Scotland) Order 2014 introduced additional protection for seals at 194 designated haul-out sites and in 2017 the seal haul-out site at Forvie National Nature reserve was granted this designation and legal protection. To avoid disturbance to the seals the advised viewpoint is established on the Newburgh beach. The population is growing rapidly with numbers anywhere between 1,000 and 3,000 seals present.

Bottlenose dolphins visit the seas off Forvie, and there is a population of Eurasian otter on the River Ythan. Other mammals found at Forvie and those typical of northeast Scotland such roe deer, red foxes, European badgers and stoats.

== History ==
The coastline at Forvie has a long history of human occupation. The earliest evidence of human activity takes the form of flint working sites and shell middens, which date from around 8,000 years ago. Excavations have also revealed burial cairns from the Neolithic period (around 6,000 years ago), and kerb cairns (built to hold cremation remains) dating from the Bronze Age. Other Bronze Age objects found at Forvie include pieces of a quern-stone and fragments of pottery. The remains of a small village of 31 huts dating from around 700 BC have also been identified. Finds from the village include jet beads, bracelets, querns and pottery.

In 1959 the Sands of Forvie was declared a national nature reserve (NNR) by agreement between the Nature Conservancy Council (predecessor body of NatureScot) and the landowners; the NNR was extended in 1979 to include the Ythan Estuary. In 2003 65 hectares (160 acres) were purchased from the landowners, with the remaining land being purchased in 2012.

=== During the World Wars ===
Forvie was active in World Wars I and II, although very few details are recorded on the use of the area. It was incorrectly claimed there was a nine-hole golf course from 1900 to the outbreak of World War II. The course built for Lady Cathcart in 1900 was on the west coast island Uist.

The layout of Forvie and Newburgh could be mistaken for the mouth of the River Don in Aberdeen. With this in mind, defences were put in places around the mouth of the Ythan. These consisted of pillboxes, two gun batteries and anti-tank blocks built by the 143rd Pioneer Corps. From a review of vulnerable beaches from April–October 1941, Forvie appeared on this list and was identified as "blocked with mines". The minefield ran from East to West (WO ref 31/521474 to 538472). These were British Type C land mines weighing about 65 lbs each.

Following a clear-up of the area in July 1944, a number of landmines were unaccounted for due to the shifting sands of the area. Mine clearance altered the area slightly as the Bomb Disposal Unit from the Royal Engineers used a converted Bren gun carrier (known as a wasp) as a flamethrower to scorch vegetation on the mined area. Images of the clearance and the location of the minefield is recorded in a local book covering World War II in northeastern Scotland. Records show on some days 222 mines being dealt with, the actual mine count is unknown but the area took several months to clear. On 27 July 1944, Sapper Harry Dean (28) of 11 coy, Royal Engineers was killed whilst clearing a mine at Forvie. Sapper Dean is buried in Yorkshire.

The Ythan Estuary, Forvie National Nature Reserve, Aberdeenshire, Scotland

Forvie sands was used to train the Gordon Highlanders and Highland Light Infantry in desert warfare, in addition to this Forvie Moor was used to train soldiers in the use of grenade, anti-tank grenades and two-inch trench mortars. Since the war, mortar bombs have been found across the moor. Craters are still visible in the area. The soldiers training at Forvie were billeted at the Slains Lodge and buildings in Collieston.

On 3 November 1940, 30 High Explosive Bombs were dropped on Forvie Links by the Luftwaffe. This is listed in the Aberdeenshire Civil Defence register, the craters can be seen in 1941 and 1946 aerial photos.

Whilst soldiers were training there, the moor were off limits to locals. However, on Sundays, the locals could use the moor. During this time, locals collected birds eggs to use as food was rationed, and there was a plentiful supply of rabbits. On Sunday 30 November 1941, three local boys found an unexploded anti-tank grenade in a rabbit burrow that the army had been demonstrating to the home guard. One of the boys (Alex Ross), then threw it away where it exploded causing him to lose sight in one eye.

On 31 March 1941, the British steamer Melrose Abbey ran aground. On 2 April 1941 she was hit by a drifting sea mine blowing a large hole in her side, and settled on the Ythan river bed. During this time, a machine gun was posted at Forvie Sands to offer some protection for the vessel whilst plans were made to move her as she was a target for passing aircraft. The ship was refloated on 26 July 1941 and towed to Aberdeen for repairs. She was later sunk by U-356 on 27 December 1942 north-east of the Azores. Several websites confirm this sinking, but this disagrees with the information in the reference below, which states that "As for Melrose Abbey, she was released from the Royal Navy in May 1945 and returned to her former owners, the Associated Humber Lines." The second reference may help to resolve this mix-up of ship names.

Beside the pill box of Forvie, two mobile naval four-inch guns were places and controlled by 942nd Defence battery.

On 26 January 1942, the SS Lesrix, which was carrying machinery, ran aground off Hackley head during a blizzard. Locals in the community aided in the rescue of some of the crew, although ten crew members were lost. A bronze medal for gallantry was given by the King to one local for his part.

During patrols on the beach and cliffs of Forvie, a dinghy was found and this sparked a search for a spy that had been landed by submarine. This spy was caught in the moray area. It was rumoured that Tillery house near Udny had fascist sympathizers, where spies and airmen were told this was a "safe house" during the war. Since there were also Norwegian army personnel in the area who patrolled the beaches, the coast guard and home guard were issued with passes to identify themselves to the Norwegian soldiers.

In 1948, the Forvie area was earmarked to be a bombing and artillery range for the Royal Air Force and Army, as a site further north than the existing area at Lunan Bay near Arbroath. Forvie was to be used for air to ground and dive bombing practice. This involved a gunnery range out at sea and a rifle range on the moor. This proposal was cancelled in 1950; records exist in the National Archives on the proposal.

=== Folklore ===
The deserted village of Forvie lies within the sand dunes. Excavations of the village church, which is dedicated to Saint Adamnan, shown that it was constructed in the 12th-century, and the dating of burials within the church indicate that it had become a ruin by the 15th-century: local folk history tells of a nine-day storm that occurred from a curse of three daughters deprived the inheritance of the land by dirty means, leading to the village being engulfed by sand in August 1413. The daughters were said to have prayed to heaven for the land to be made 'worthless'. Their prayer concluded: "Let nocht bee funde in Furvye's glebys Bot thystl, bente and sande." The parish of Forvie was annexed by the neighbouring parish of Slains in 1573.

== Visitors ==
The Forvie National Nature Reserve is visited by around 35,000 people each year. Stevenson Forvie Centre near Collieston at the northern end of the reserve provides information to visitors. The centre first opened in the 1980s, and was substantially upgraded in 1998 with funding from Shell and a bequest from a local resident, Margaret Stevenson, after whom the centre is now named.

Two waymarked trails to allow visitors to access the reserve. The 5.5 km (3.4 mi) Dune Trail is a circular route around the southern part of the reserve, through the dunes landscape and out to the beach, passing the site of the abandoned village and the ruins of the kirk. The 3.4 km (2.1 mi) Heath Trail is a circular route starting and finishing at the visitor centre, passing through the heathland of the northern part of the reserve. The two paths can be linked by a path running along the seafront.
