= Mole (architecture) =

Massive structure used as a pier, breakwater, or causeway

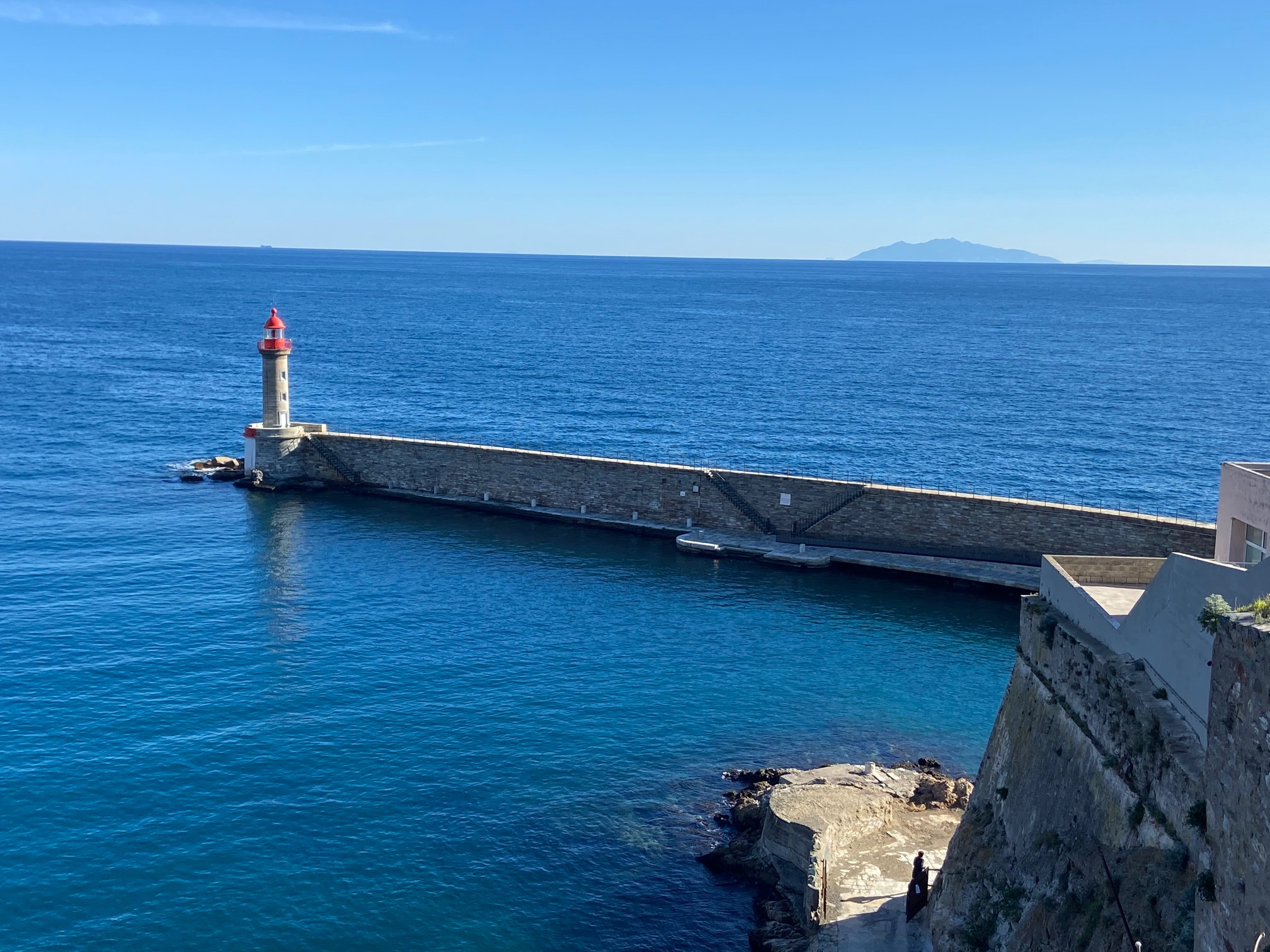
A mole at Bastia in Corsica

A mole is a massive structure, usually of stone, used as a pier, breakwater, or causeway separating two bodies of water. A mole may have a wooden structure built on top, resembling a wooden pier. However, the defining feature of a mole is that water cannot freely flow underneath it, unlike a true pier. The oldest known mole is at Wadi al-Jarf, an ancient Egyptian harbor complex on the Red Sea, constructed c. 2500 BCE.

The word comes from Middle French mole, ultimately from Latin mōlēs, referring to a large mass, especially of rock. The words molecule and mole (the unit of measurement in chemistry) have the same root.

== Heptastadion ==
Notable in antiquity was the Heptastadion, a giant mole built in the 3rd century BC in the city of Alexandria, Egypt, to join the city to Pharos Island, where the Pharos lighthouse stood. The causeway formed a barrier separating Alexandria's oceanfront into two distinct harbours, an arrangement which had the advantage of protecting the harbours from the force of the strong westerly coastal current. The Heptastadion is also believed to have served as an aqueduct while Pharos was inhabited, and geophysical research indicates that it was part of the road network of the ancient city. Silting over the years resulted in the former dyke disappearing under several metres of accumulated silt and soil, upon which the Ottomans built a town from 1517 onwards. Part of the modern city of Alexandria is now built on the site.

== Stone quaysides ==
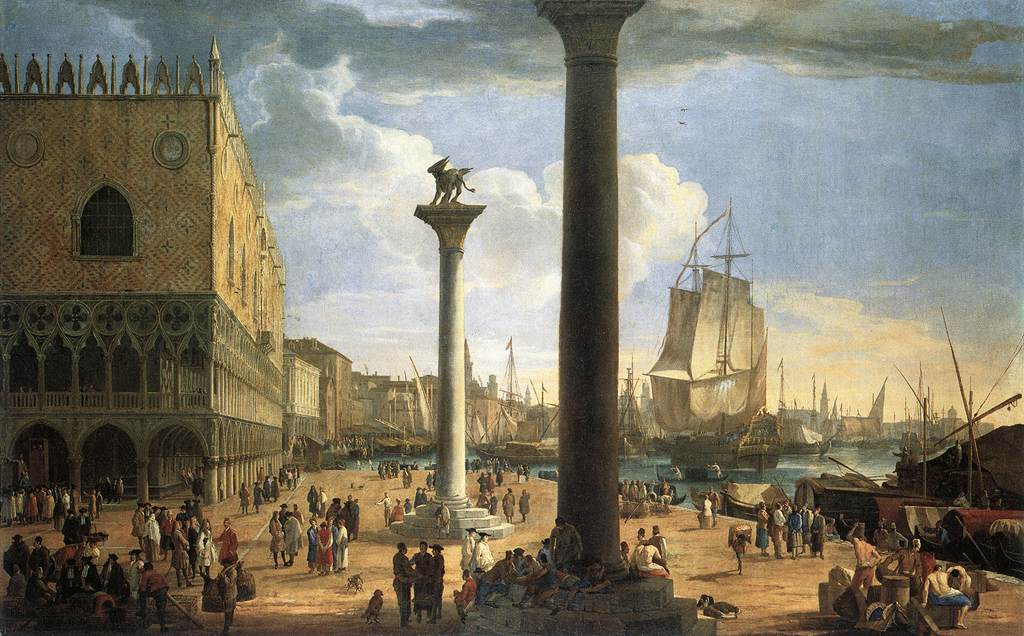
Painting of the Molo, Venice by Luca Carlevarijs. The Doge's Palace is shown on the left.

Stone quaysides are sometimes called moles. A well-known example is the Molo in Venice. It is the site of the Doge's Palace and two pillars which form a gateway to the sea. It has been depicted numerous times by artists, such as Canaletto.

== San Francisco Bay Area ==
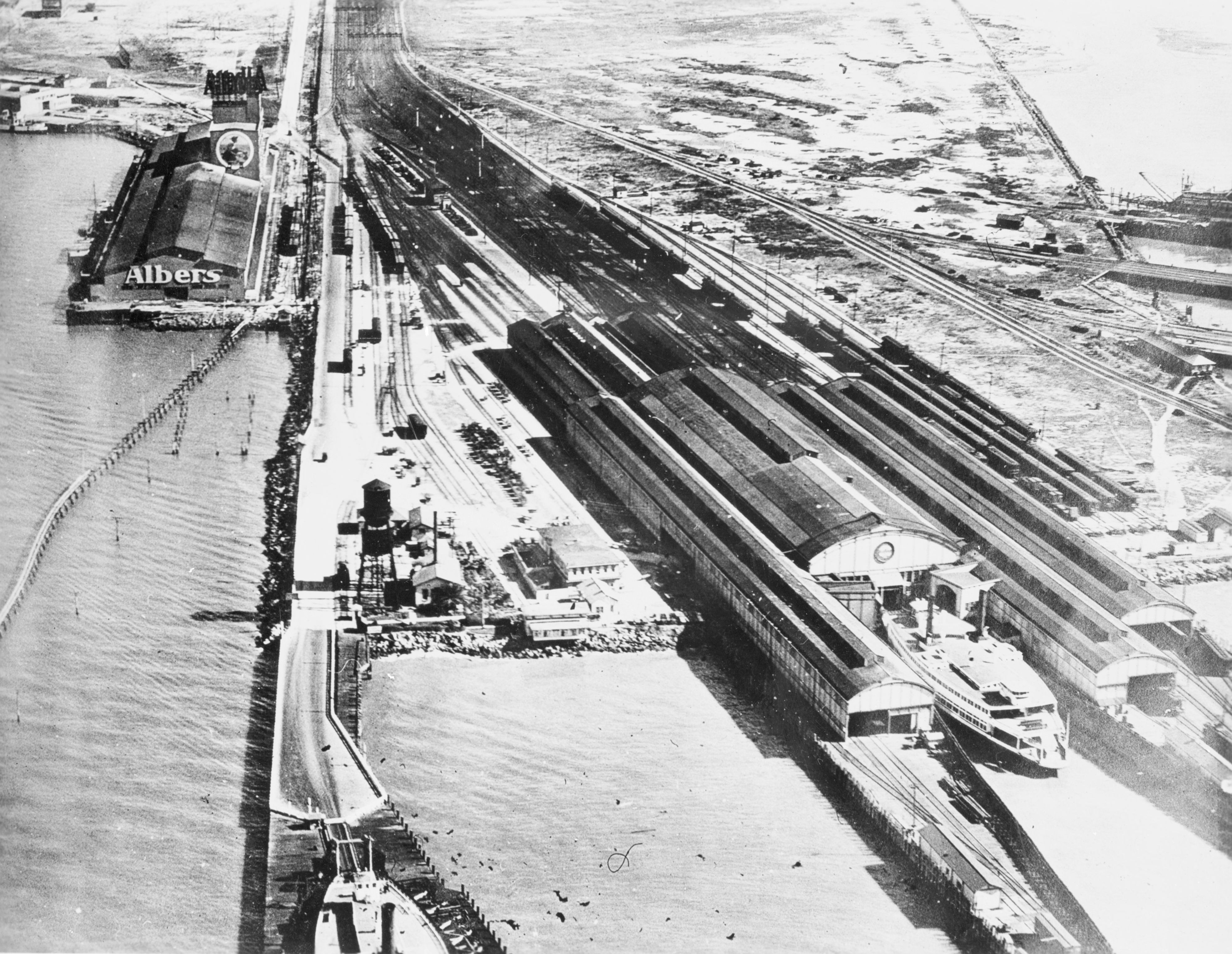
Oakland Long Wharf, San Francisco East Bay

In the San Francisco Bay Area in California, there were several moles, combined causeways and wooden piers or trestles extending from the eastern shore and utilized by various railroads, such as the Key System, Southern Pacific Railroad (two), and Western Pacific Railroad: the Alameda Mole, the Oakland Mole, and the Western Pacific Mole. By extending the tracks the railroads could get beyond the shallow mud flats and reach the deeper waters of the Bay that could be navigated by the Bay Ferries. A train fell off the Alameda Mole through an open drawbridge in 1890, killing several people. None of the four Bay Area moles survive today, although the causeway portions of each were incorporated into the filling in of large tracts of marshland for harbor and industrial development.

A large mole was completed in 1947 at the San Francisco Naval Shipyard in the Bayview-Hunters Point neighborhood of San Francisco to accommodate the large Hunters Point gantry crane. The mole required 3,000,000 cubic yards (2,300,000 m^{3}) of fill.

== Namibia ==
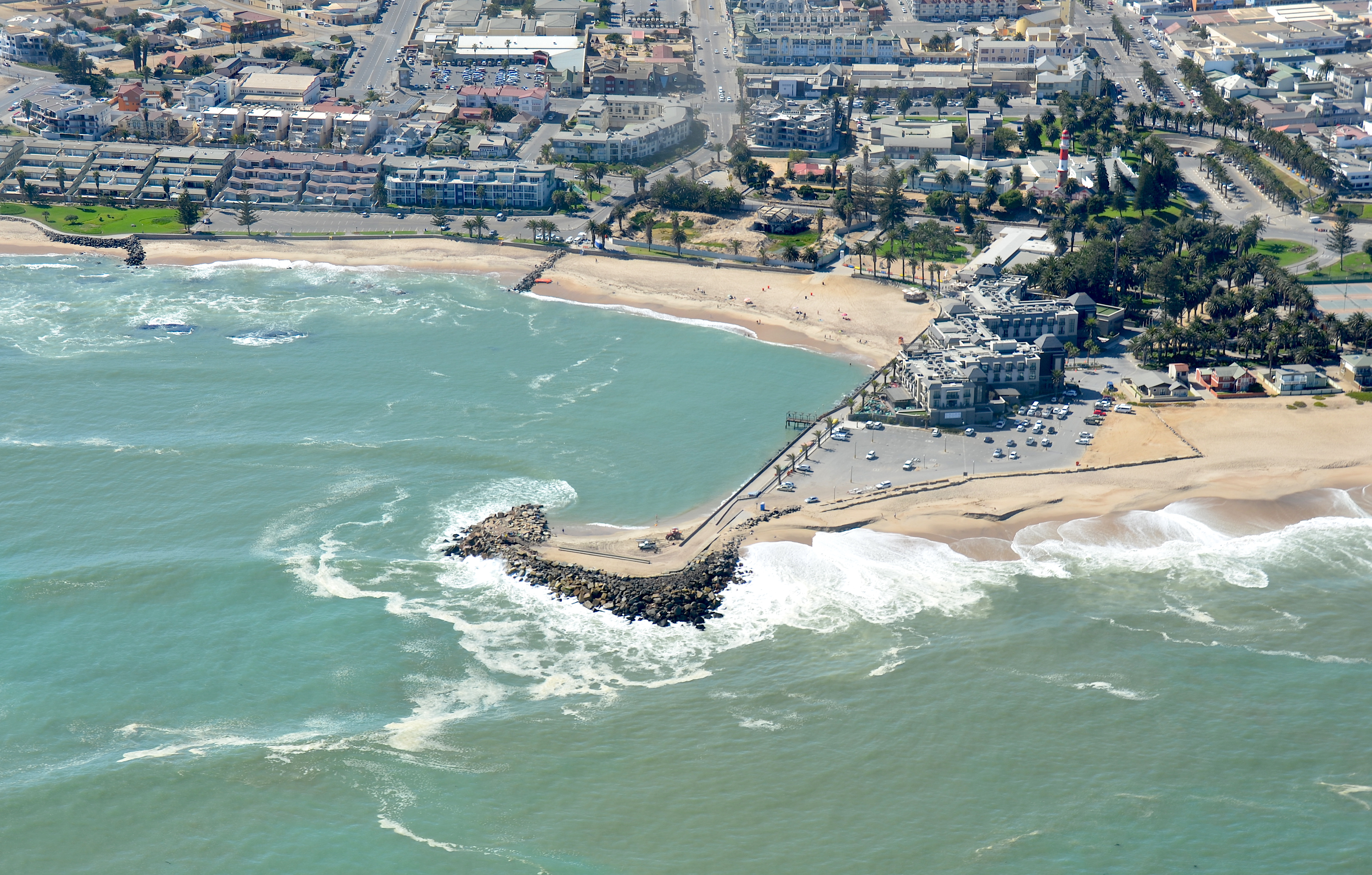
Aerial view of Mole Swakopmund (Namibia) (2017)

In Swakopmund, on the coast of Namibia, a mole was built in 1899. Designed by the engineer F. W. Oftloff, it was intended to develop the city's harbour. However, the Benguela Current continually deposited sand onto the mole until it became a promontory. The adjacent area has since become a popular leisure beach, known as the Mole Beach.

== World War II ==
=== Dunkirk evacuation ===
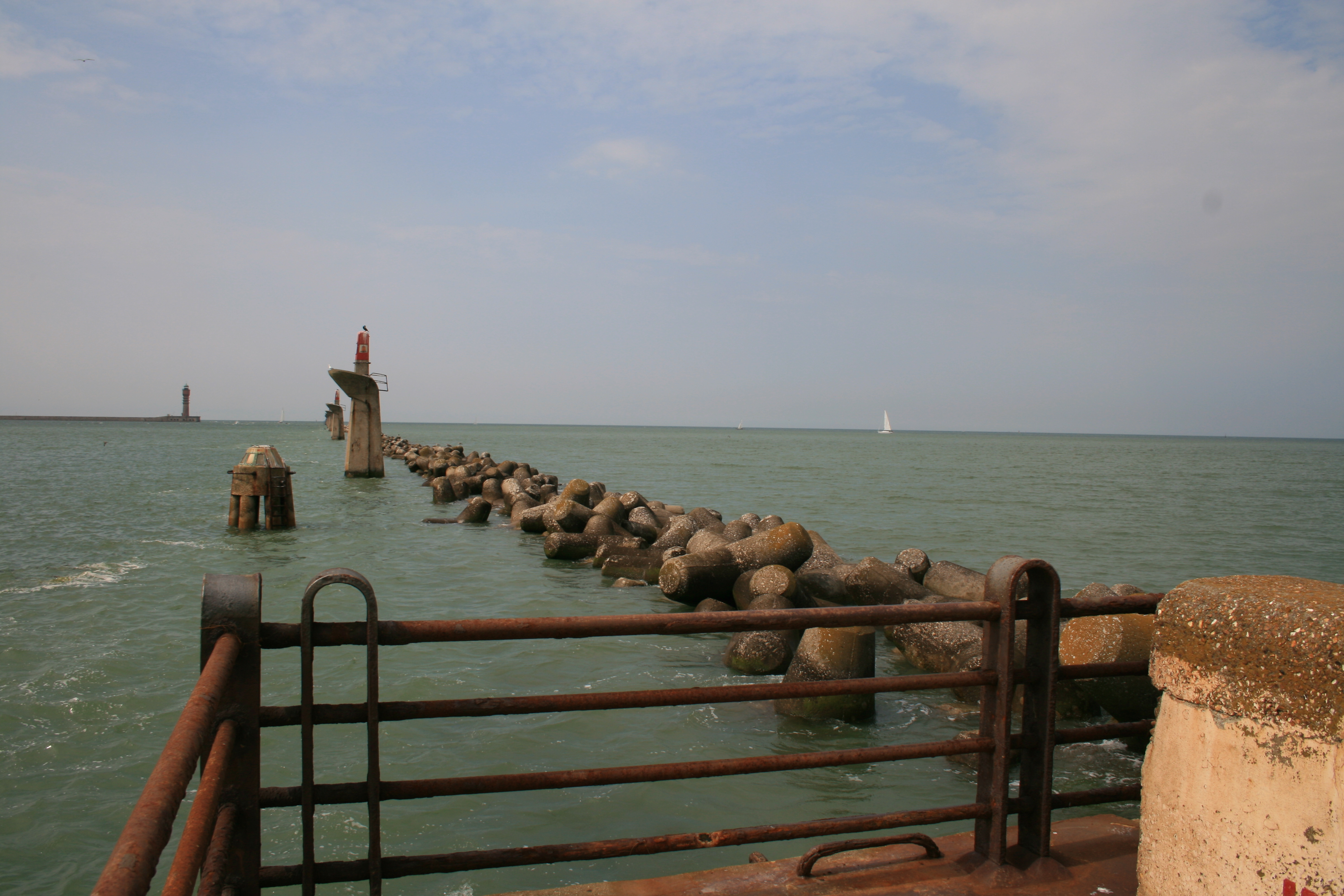
The remains of the East Mole of Dunkirk harbour, pictured in 2009

The two concrete moles protecting the outer harbour at Dunkirk played a significant part in the evacuation of British and French troops during World War II in May to June 1940. The harbour had been made unusable by German bombing and it was clear that troops were not going to be taken directly off the beaches fast enough. Naval captain William Tennant had been placed ashore to take charge of the navy shore parties and organise the evacuation. Tennant had what proved to be the highly successful idea of using the East Mole to take off troops. The moles had never been designed to dock ships, but despite this, the majority of troops rescued from Dunkirk were taken off in this way. James Campbell Clouston, pier master on the east mole, organised and regulated the flow of men on that site.

=== Churchill Barriers ===
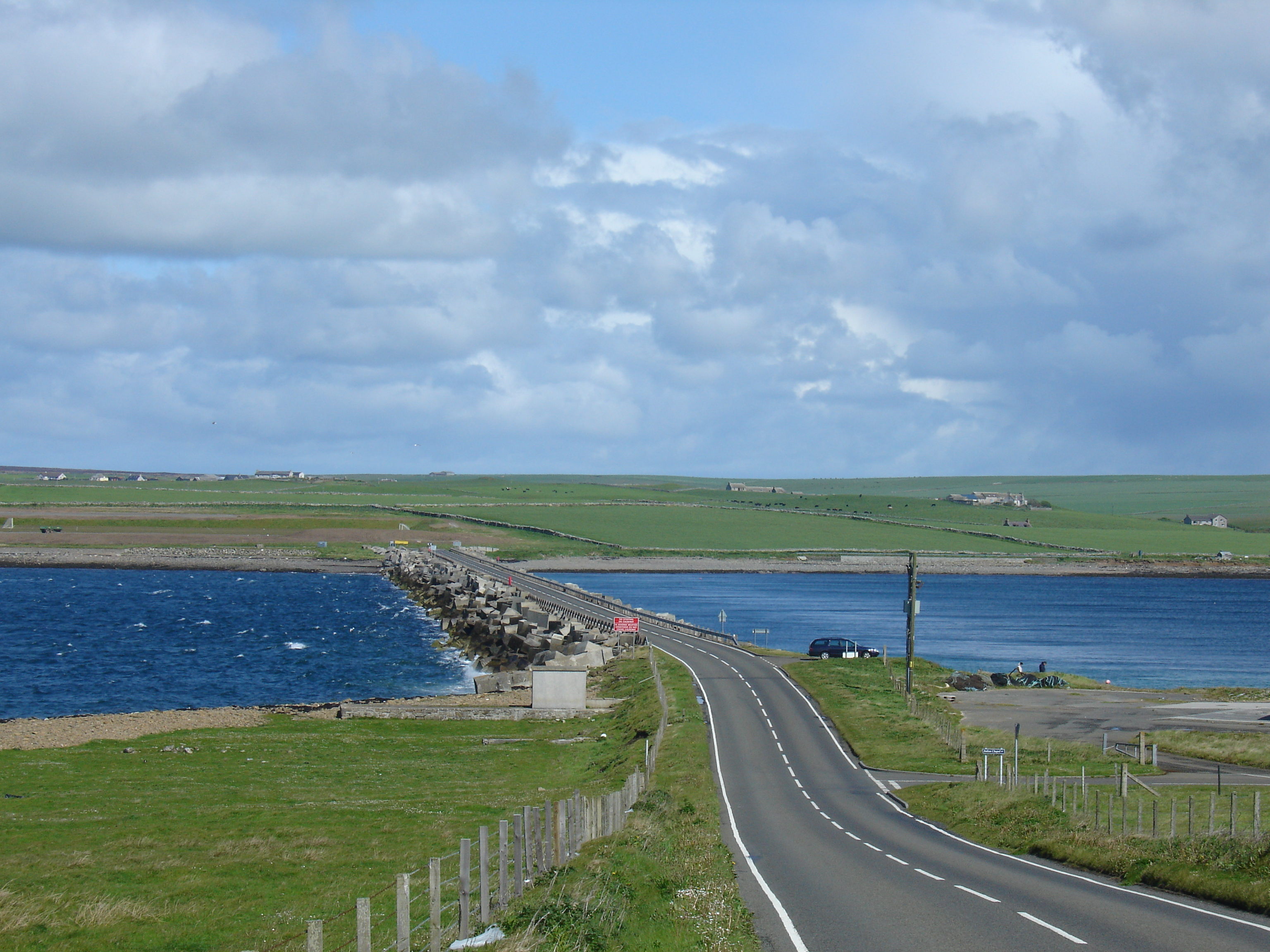
Churchill Barrier 1, blocking Kirk Sound

The Churchill Barriers are a series of four causeways in the Orkney Islands with a total length of 1.5 miles (2.4 km). They link the Orkney Mainland in the north to the island of South Ronaldsay via Burray and the two smaller islands of Lamb Holm and Glimps Holm.

The barriers were built in the 1940s as naval defences to protect the anchorage at Scapa Flow. They were commissioned following the sinking of HMS Royal Oak in 1939 by German U-boat U-47 which had penetrated the existing defences of sunken blockships and anti-submarine nets. The barriers now serve as road links, carrying the A961 road from Kirkwall to Burwick.

== See also ==
- Breakwater (structure) – Coastal defense structure
- Seawall – Form of coastal defence
- Groyne – Structure extending into a body of water to alter water flow
- Jetty – Low bank or small wharf stretching from the shore into a water span
