= John Firth =

John Firth may refer to:

- John Firth (cricketer) (1900–1957), schoolboy cricketer and Church of England clergyman
- John Firth (folklorist) (1838–1922), Scottish folklorist
- John Rupert Firth (1890–1960), commonly known as J. R. Firth, English linguist
- John Firth (baseball) (1855–1902), baseball player
- John C. B. Firth (1894–1931), World War I flying ace
