= Heptastadion =

Causeway in Ptolemaic Alexandria

- Map of ancient Alexandria, with the Heptastadion shown linking Pharos Island to the mainland.

- Map of Egypt showing the location of the Heptastadion.
- 31°11′58″N 29°53′06″E
- Type: Mole
- Cultures: Ptolemaic Kingdom
- Location: Alexandria
- Region: Egypt
- Part of: Alexandria Port

History
- Built: c. 300 BC
- Built by: Ptolemy I
- Event: Caesar's Civil War

Site notes
- Elevation: 0 m (0 ft)
- Length: 1,260 metres (4,130 ft)
- Condition: Buried

The Heptastadion (Greek: Ὲπταστάδιον) was a giant causeway, often referred to as a mole or a dyke built by the people of Alexandria, Egypt in the 3rd century BC during the Ptolemaic period. The Heptastadion was created to link Pharos Island to the mainland coast and given a name based on its length (Heptastadion is Greek for "seven stadia"— hepta meaning seven, and a stadion being a Greek unit of length measuring approximately 180 m (590 ft)). Overall it was more than three-quarters of a mile long.

== History ==
Alexander the Great founded the city of Alexandria in April 331 BC on the site of the small fishing village of Rhacotis as the marine base for his fleet. The city was built on a narrow limestone ridge opposite to Pharos Island where the Pharos lighthouse would later stand. Forces under Alexander's command cleared the sand and silt deposits which made the port unnavigable, and Alexander's engineer Dinocrates linked the port of Alexandria and the island of Pharos with a bridge 1,200 m (3,900 ft) long and 200 m (660 ft) wide, creating two harbour basins for commercial and military shipping. The northeast basin (currently the Eastern harbour) was designed for military vessels and the southwest basin (currently the main port of Alexandria) was for commercial use.

In the Ptolemaic period the lighthouse was constructed on the orders of Ptolemy I and II. It is probable that Ptolemy I was also responsible for the building of the Heptastadion. The causeway formed a barrier further separating the two harbours of Alexandria's oceanfront. This arrangement had the advantage of protecting the harbours from the force of the strong westerly coastal current. The east side of the mole became the Portus Magnus (the Great Harbour or Royal Harbour), now an open bay. The west side became the Portus Eunostus (the commercial harbour), with its inner basin Kibotos, now vastly enlarged to form the modern harbour. Two channels with bridges above were let under the causeway to allow access between the two ports. Julius Caesar ordered these channels to be blocked during the Alexandrian War. The Heptastadion is also believed to have served as an aqueduct while Pharos was inhabited, and geophysical research indicates that it was part of the road network of the ancient city.

== Later periods ==
Due to silting over the years, the former dyke now lies under several metres of accumulated silt and soil which form the Mansheya isthmus, upon which the Ottomans built their town from 1517 onwards. Today's city development lying between the present Grand Square and the modern Ras el-Tin quarter is built on the silt which gradually widened and obliterated the mole.
