= John Firth (folklorist) =

Scottish folklorist

John Firth (1838–1922) was a Scottish folklorist. He was born in Redland on Mainland, Orkney. He worked as a joiner and wheelwright and had a workshop in the village of Finstown, in the parish of Firth. He wrote Reminiscences of an Orkney Parish.
