= Lamb Holm =

Uninhabited island in Orkney, Scotland

Location
- Lamb Holm shown within the Orkney Islands
- OS grid reference: HY486003
- Coordinates: 58.8875°N 2.8925°W

Physical geography
- Island group: Orkney
- Area: 40 ha (0.15 sq mi)
- Area rank: 220
- Highest elevation: 20 m (66 ft)

Administration
- Council area: Orkney Islands
- Country: Scotland
- Sovereign state: United Kingdom

Demographics
- Population: 0

Lamb Holm is a small uninhabited island in Orkney, Scotland, now connected to its neighbours by two of the Churchill Barriers. During the early 1940s it was the site of 'Camp 60', housing 550 Italian Prisoners of War who helped construct the causeways. Another legacy of their time on the island is the Italian Chapel, now the island's main attraction. A grass airfield occupies much of the island interior.

Lamb Holm is classified by the National Records of Scotland as an uninhabited island that "had no usual residents at the time of either the 2001 or 2011 censuses."

== Geography ==
Lamb Holm lies in Holm Sound, one of the eastern entrances to Scapa Flow, between Mainland, Orkney and the island of Burray, It is 40 hectares (0.15 sq mi) in area.

The Churchill Barriers carry the road from South Ronaldsay to Mainland, Orkney. Lamb Holm is connected to Glimps Holm, to the southwest, by Barrier number 2, and to Mainland by Barrier number 1.

The quarry used to build the Churchill Barriers has now been flooded and converted into a fish farm.

On the northwest of the island, on the shore of St Mary's Bay, are the remains of a prehistoric settlement which have been designated as a scheduled monument.

There is a Bronze Age Barrow mound on the island named as "Laughton's Knowe". The name may have evolved from an earlier form "Lachtane" or "Lauchtain" associated with Orkney but prior to the family of this name settling on the island following the impignoration in 1472 resulting in an influx of Scottish Tacksmen loyal to the Stewart King of Scots, it is likely to have had either no name at all or an entirely different reference.

== Italian Chapel ==
Built by Italian prisoners of war during World War II, the highly ornamented Italian Chapel is now the island's main attraction. The chapel is a Category A listed building.

In 1942, more than 1300 Italian prisoners of war were captured in North Africa and taken to Orkney, where they remained until early 1945. Of these, 550 were taken to Camp 60, where they were put to work building the Churchill Barriers, four causeways created to block unwanted extra sea accesses to Scapa Flow.

In 1943, Major T. P. Buckland, Camp 60's new commandant, and Father Giacombazzi, the Camp's priest agreed that a place of worship was required. Two Nissen huts were joined to form a makeshift chapel. The prisoners, under the leadership of prisoner Domenico Chiocchetti, did all of the work to transform a simple corrugated iron structure into a work of beauty. The chapel was lined with plasterwork and an altar was made out of concrete. Chiocchetti painted the sanctuary end of the chapel. The beauty that he created led to the prisoners decorating the entire interior and creating a front façade out of concrete that concealed the shape of the hut and made the building look like a church.

Outside the chapel is a concrete sculpture of St George, seated on a horse and slaying a dragon with a lance. This was made by Chiocchetti and other prisoners in early 1943. Reinforced by spare bits of barbed wire and made from the same concrete being used to build the Barriers, this was the first art project approved by Major Buckland. It was the success of this sculpture, thought to represent the 'slaying of all misunderstandings between people of different cultures', that encouraged Buckland to approve the Chapel itself.

Since the prisoners' departure, several residents of Camp 60, including Chiocchetti, have made return visits to the chapel they created. In 1996 a declaration was jointly signed by officials in Orkney and Chiocchetti's hometown of Moena, reinforcing the ties between the two places. The building has been preserved and is still used as a chapel.

== Gallery ==
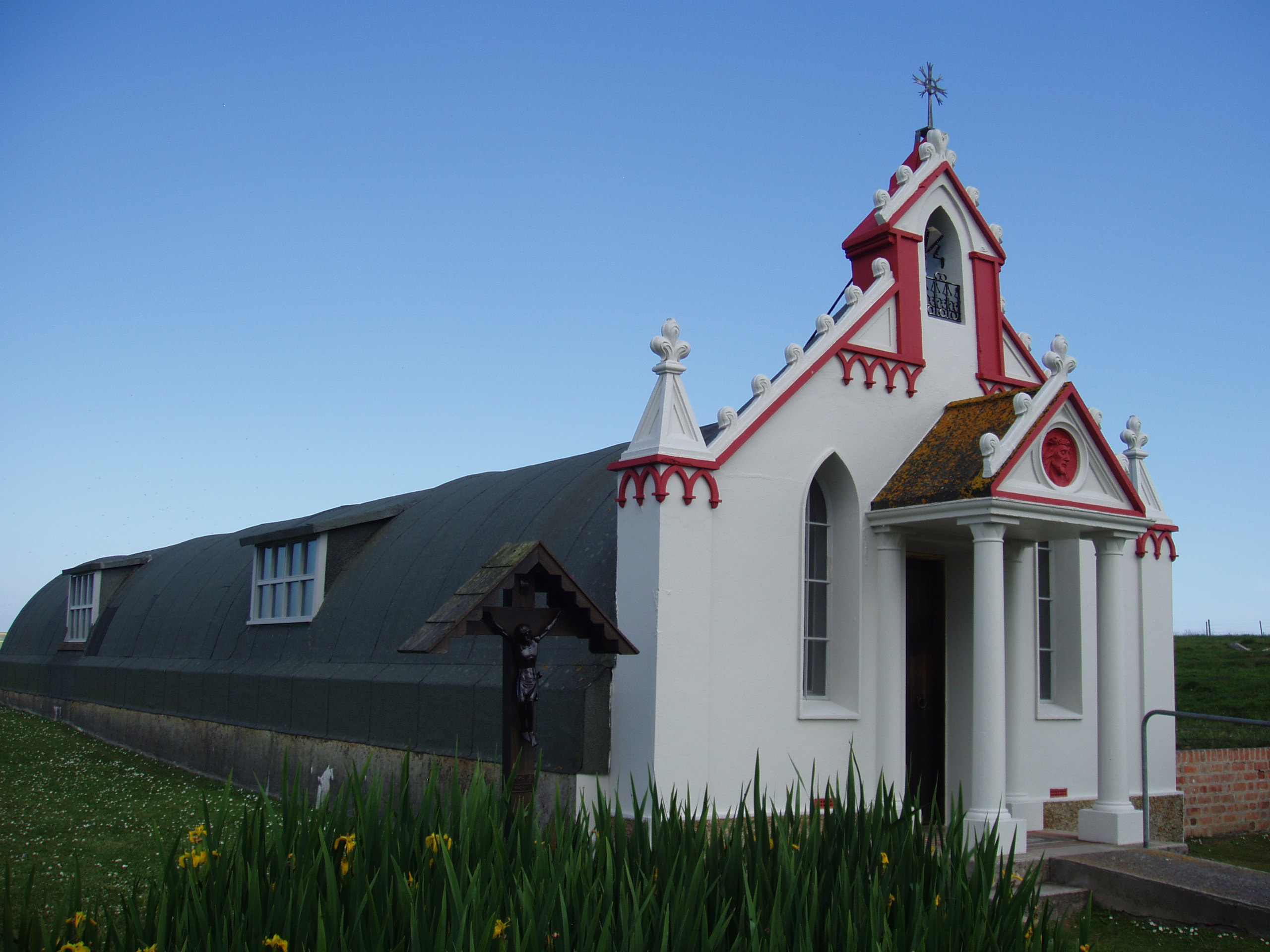
Exterior of the Italian Chapel

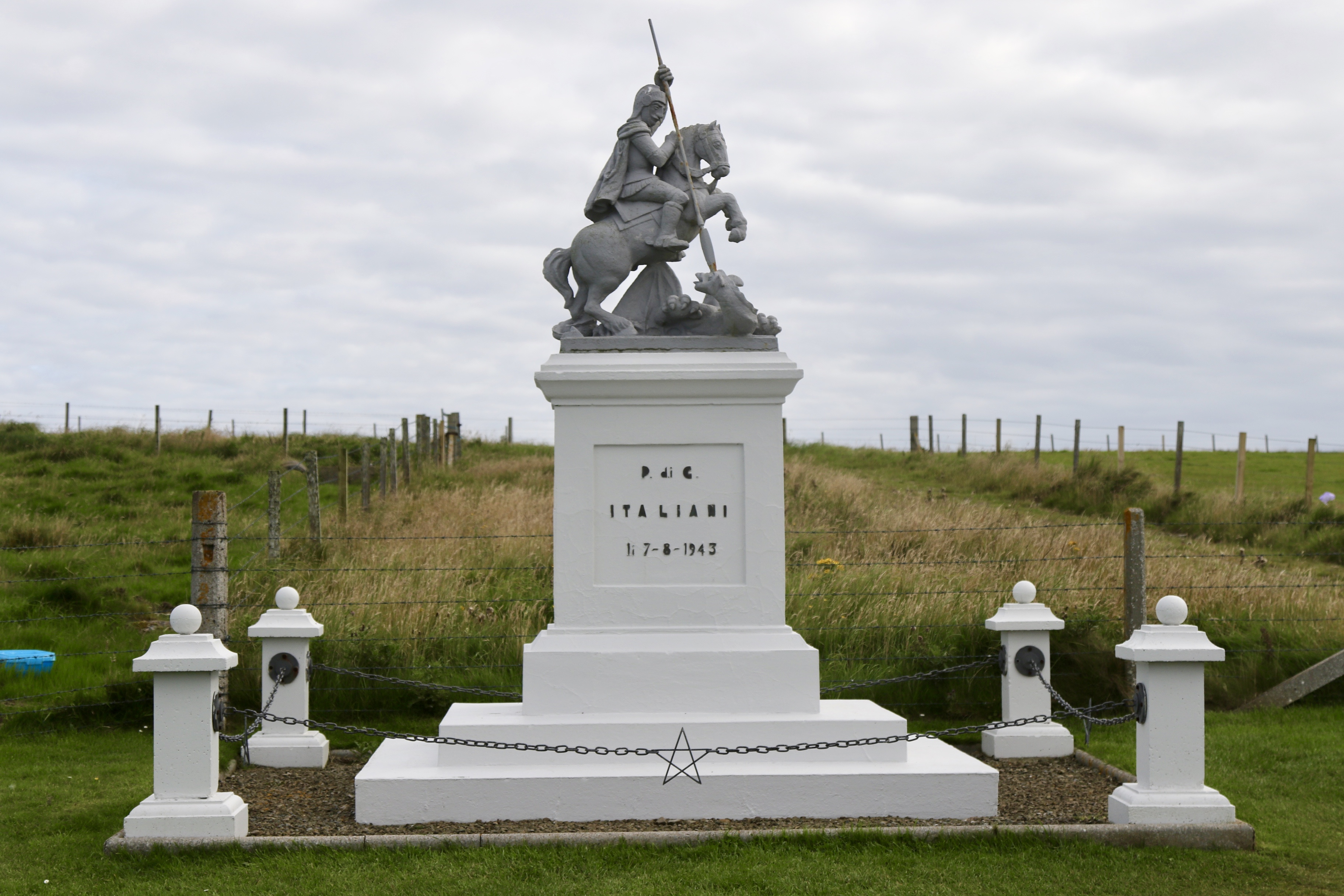
War Memorial with Statue of St George, Lamb Holm

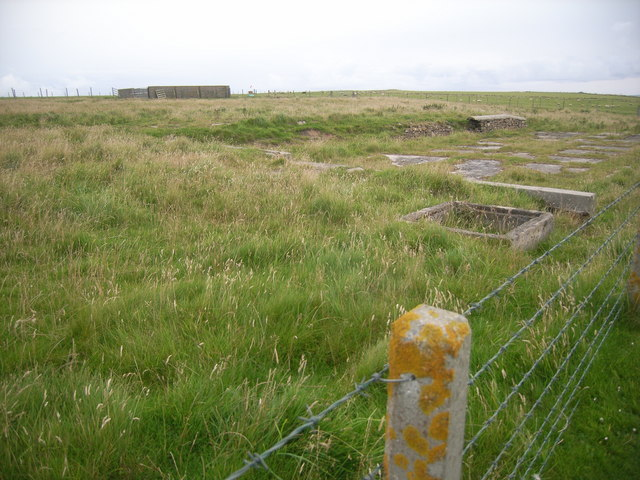
Hut platform remains of Prisoner of War Camp 60, Lamb Holm

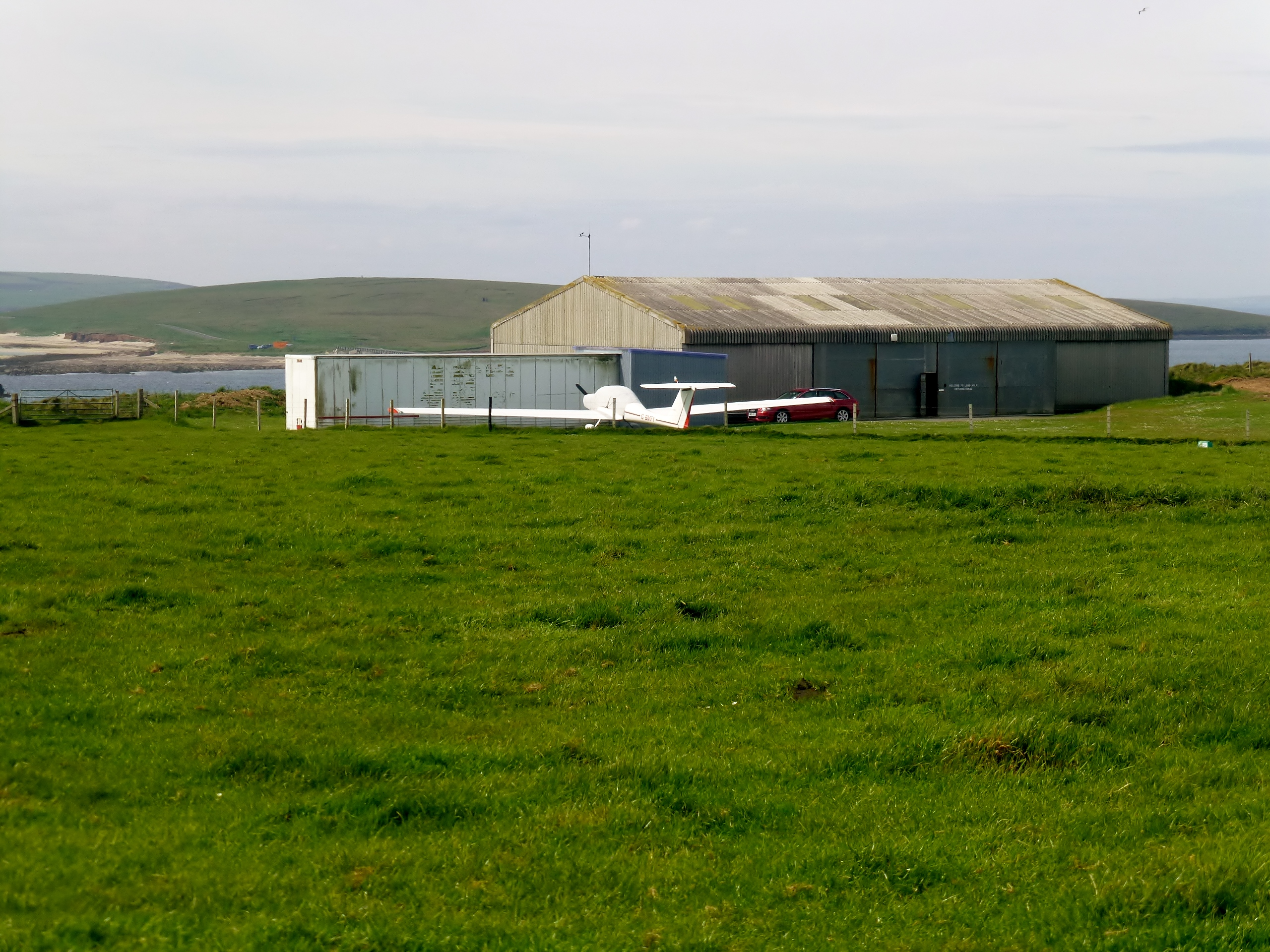
Lamb Holm Airfield

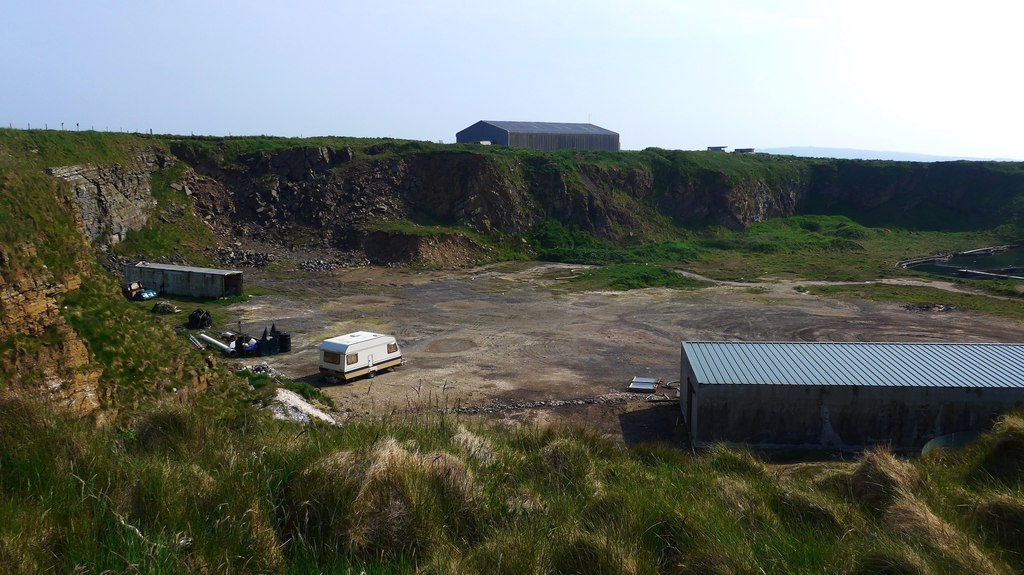
One of the Lamb Holm quarries in 2018

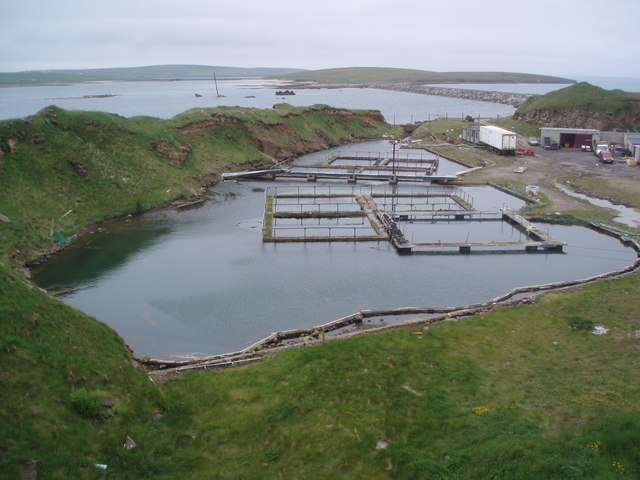
The flooded quarry on Lamb Holm, used for the Churchill Barriers. In the background is barrier no.2.

== See also ==
- List of islands of Scotland
