= Mainland, Orkney =

Main island of the Orkney Islands, Scotland

Mainland
- Map of Orkney with the Mainland highlighted

Location
- Location within Scotland
- OS grid reference: HY350158
- Coordinates: 59°00′N 3°06′W

Physical geography
- Island group: Orkney
- Area: 52,325 ha (202 sq mi)
- Area rank: 6
- Highest elevation: Mid Hill 271 m (889 ft)

Administration
- Council area: Orkney Islands Council
- Country: Scotland
- Sovereign state: United Kingdom

Demographics
- Population: 17,779
- Population rank: 3
- Population density: 33.98 people/km^{2}
- Largest settlement: Kirkwall

The Mainland, also known as Pomona, is the main island of Orkney, Scotland. Both of Orkney's burghs, Kirkwall and Stromness, lie on the island, which is also the heart of Orkney's ferry and air connections.

Seventy-five per cent of Orkney's population live on the island, which is more densely populated than the other islands of the archipelago. The lengthy history of the island's occupation has provided numerous important archaeological sites and the sandstone bedrock provides a platform for fertile farmland. There is an abundance of wildlife, especially seabirds.

== Names and etymology ==
The name Mainland is an anglicisation of the Old Norse Meginland, which had the same meaning. The Norsemen also called the island Hrossey, meaning "horse island". Historically, the island was known in English as Pomona (or Pomonia), a ghost name derived from a misreading of Solinus. (Note: In describing the mythical island of Thule, supposedly located five days' sail from Orkney, Solinus writes: Thyle larga et diutina pomona copiosa est ("Thule is fertile and is rich in long-lasting produce"). Some misread this as a description of two different islands, one named Thyle and the other named Pomona, and the latter came to be identified with the Mainland of Orkney. This misapprehension can be traced as far back as the 14th-century chronicler John of Fordun.) This name remained in use into the 19th century, and survives in the names of local establishments like the Pomona Inn in Finstown and the Pomona Café in the capital of Kirkwall.

== Geography ==
The island is relatively densely populated and has much fertile farmland. The bulk of the Mainland is west of Kirkwall and is low-lying, with coastal cliffs to the north and west and two sizeable bodies of freshwater, the lochs of Stenness and Harray.

The eastern part of the Mainland is shaped like the letter "W", the easternmost peninsula being known as Deerness. To the south, causeways called Churchill Barriers connect the island to Burray and South Ronaldsay via Lamb Holm and Glimps Holm.

Mainland effectively provides the core of the Orkney Islands, linking the northern members of the archipelago with the southern ones. At the east, and west ends, islands proceed to the north and south, somewhat in the shape of an "X". The western part of the island is part of the Hoy and West Mainland National Scenic Area, one of 40 in Scotland.

The population in 2011 was recorded as 17,162, an increase of just over 12% on the 2001 population of 15,315. By 2022 the population had grown to 17,779.

=== Parishes ===
There are 13 parishes on the island. Sandwick, Birsay and Stromness lie on the west coast, Rendall and Evie to the north west. Holm, Deerness and St Andrews are located to the east of central St Ola, which contains Kirkwall city. Firth, Orphir, Stenness and Harray lie west of Kirkwall and east of the westernmost parishes. Harray has the unique distinction of being the only landlocked parish in Orkney, although it too has a significant coast along the Loch of Harray, albeit a freshwater one.

=== Economy ===
The economic sectors include agriculture, fisheries and aquaculture, as well as oil and gas. A 2020 report states that "over the last 20 years there has been a growth in ... manufacturing, tourism, food and drink processing and, more recently, renewable energy". Tourism is certainly significant with over 190,000 visits to the islands, many on cruise ships, in 2019.

Tourism was negatively affected by the COVID-19 pandemic during 2020 and into 2021. A September 2020 report stated that "The Highlands and Islands region has been disproportionately impacted by the COVID-19 pandemic to date, when compared to Scotland and the UK as a whole". The industry required short-term support for "business survival and recovery" and that was expected to continue as the sector was "severely impacted for as long as physical distancing and travel restrictions". A scheme called A Support for businesses - Island Equivalent was introduced by the Scottish government in early 2021 to financially assist hospitality and retail businesses "affected by Level 3 coronavirus restrictions". Previous schemes in 2020 included the Strategic Framework Business Fund and the Coronavirus Business Support Fund.

=== Main settlements ===
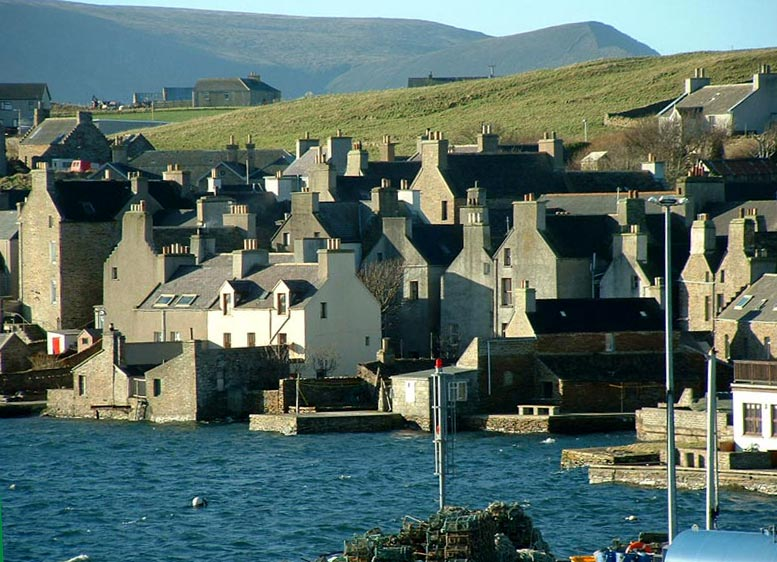
Stromness is the second largest settlement on Mainland, and Orkney in general.

The three main settlements on Mainland, in order of magnitude are Kirkwall and Stromness, both of which are burghs, and Finstown.

Kirkwall

Kirkwall, the capital of the islands, is on the isthmus between west Mainland and east Mainland, which historically enabled it to have highly active harbours facing in two directions for the southern and northern Orkney Islands; the southern one, Scapa Flow, is a large, calm and immediately ocean-accessible natural harbour. Kirkwall has the seat of the Bishop of Orkney, and St. Magnus Cathedral is to be found there. It is also one of the island's ferry ports.

Stromness

A long-established seaport that grew with the expansion of whaling, Stromness has a population of approximately 2,200 residents. The old town is clustered along the main street, flanked with houses and shops built from local stone, with narrow lanes and alleys branching off it. There is a ferry link to Scrabster in Caithness on the Scottish mainland as well as the Isle of Hoy.

Finstown

Finstown is the third largest settlement, and used to be known as the "Toon o' Firth". The origin of its name is thought to be from an Irishman named David Phin who came to the area in 1811. It is on the direct Stromness to Kirkwall road.

=== Geology ===
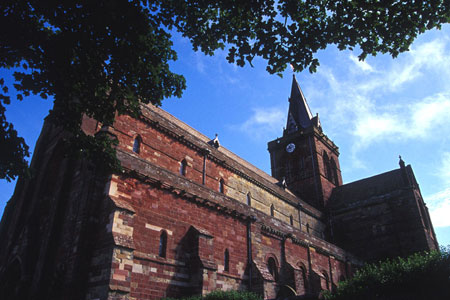
St Magnus Cathedral, built from the Old Red Sandstone prevalent on the island

In common with most of the Orkney isles, Mainland rests almost entirely on a bedrock of Old Red Sandstone, which is about 400 million years old and was laid down in the Devonian period. These thick deposits accumulated as earlier Silurian rocks, uplifted by the formation of Pangaea, eroded and then deposited into river deltas. The freshwater Lake Orcadie existed on the edges of these eroding mountains, stretching from Shetland to the southern Moray Firth. As in nearby Caithness, these rocks rest upon the metamorphic rocks of the eastern schists, and in Mainland where a narrow strip is exposed between Stromness and Inganess, they are represented by grey gneiss and granite.

The Lower Old Red Sandstone is represented by well-bedded flagstones over most of the islands; in the south of Mainland these are faulted against an overlying series of massive red sandstones.

Many indications of glacial action exist in the form of striated surfaces in Kirkwall Bay, with boulder clay with marine shells, and many boulders of rocks foreign to the islands made of chalk, oolitic limestone, flint, &c. Local moraines are found in some of the valleys.

The soil generally is a sandy loam or a strong but friable clay, and very fertile. Large quantities of seaweed as well as lime and marl are available for manure.

=== Surrounding islands ===
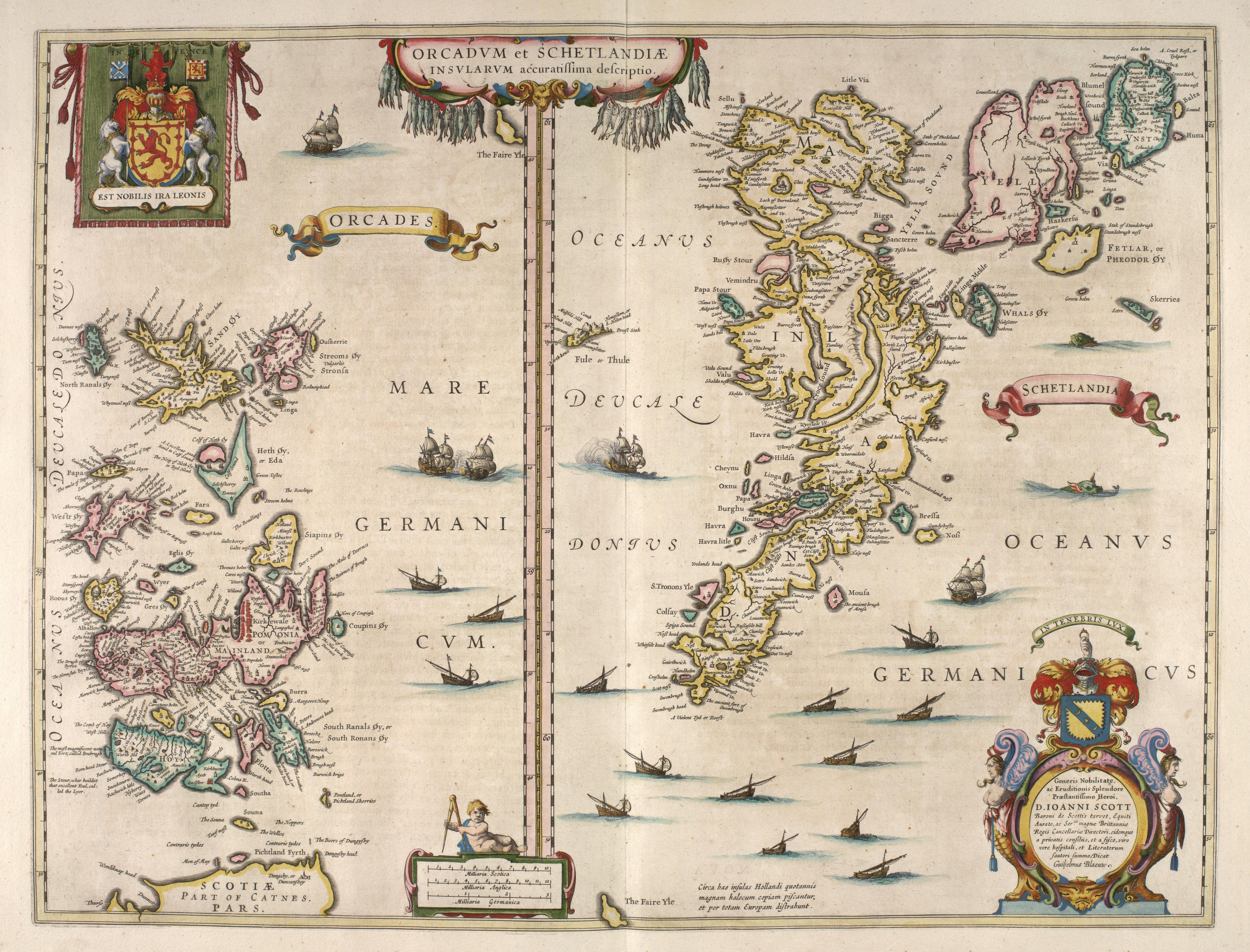
Blaeu's 1654 map of Orkney and Shetland. It uses "Pomonia or Mainland".

There are numerous smaller Orkney islands surrounding the mainland, some which are islets only separated at higher stages of the tide, or skerries which are only exposed at lower stages of the tide. These include Barrel of Butter, Bo Skerry, Bow Skerries, Braga, Brough of Bigging, Brough of Birsay, Damsay, Holm of Houton, Holm of Grimbister, Holm of Rendall, Iceland Skerry, Inner Holm, Kirk Rocks, Little Skerry, Mirkady Point, Nevi Skerry, Outer Holm, Oyster Skerries, Puldrite Skerry, Quanterness Skerry, Scare Gun, Seal Skerry, Skaill Skerries, Skerries of Clestrain, Skerries of Coubister, Skerries of Lakequoy, Skerry of Work, Skerry of Yinstay, Smoogro Skerry, Thieves Holm, Whyabatten, and Yesnaby Castle.

The other islands in the Orkney Islands are generally classified as north or south of the Mainland. The exceptions are the remote islets of Sule Skerry and Sule Stack, which lie 37 miles (60 km) west of the archipelago, but form part of Orkney for local government purposes.

== History and notable sites ==
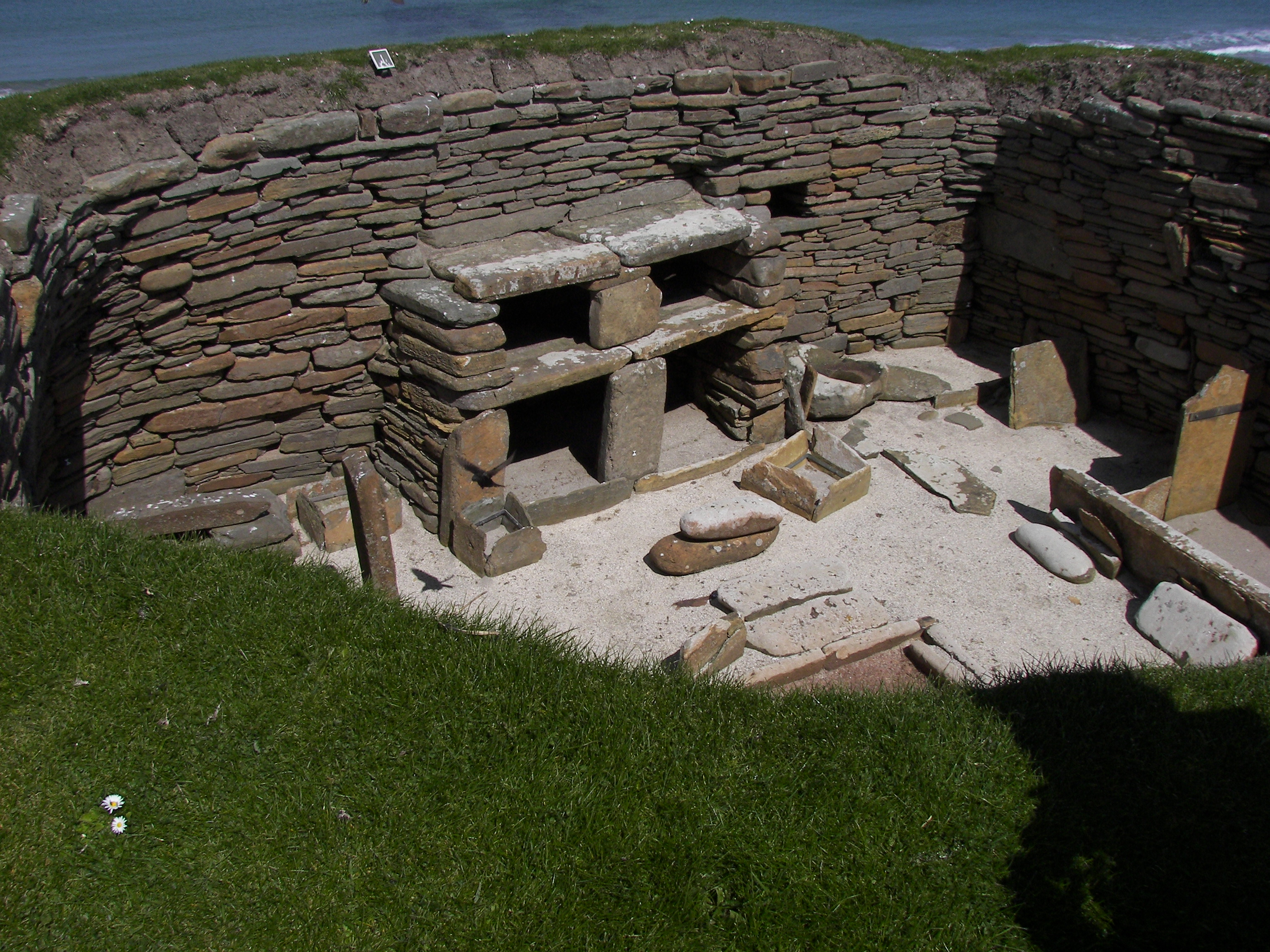
Skara Brae

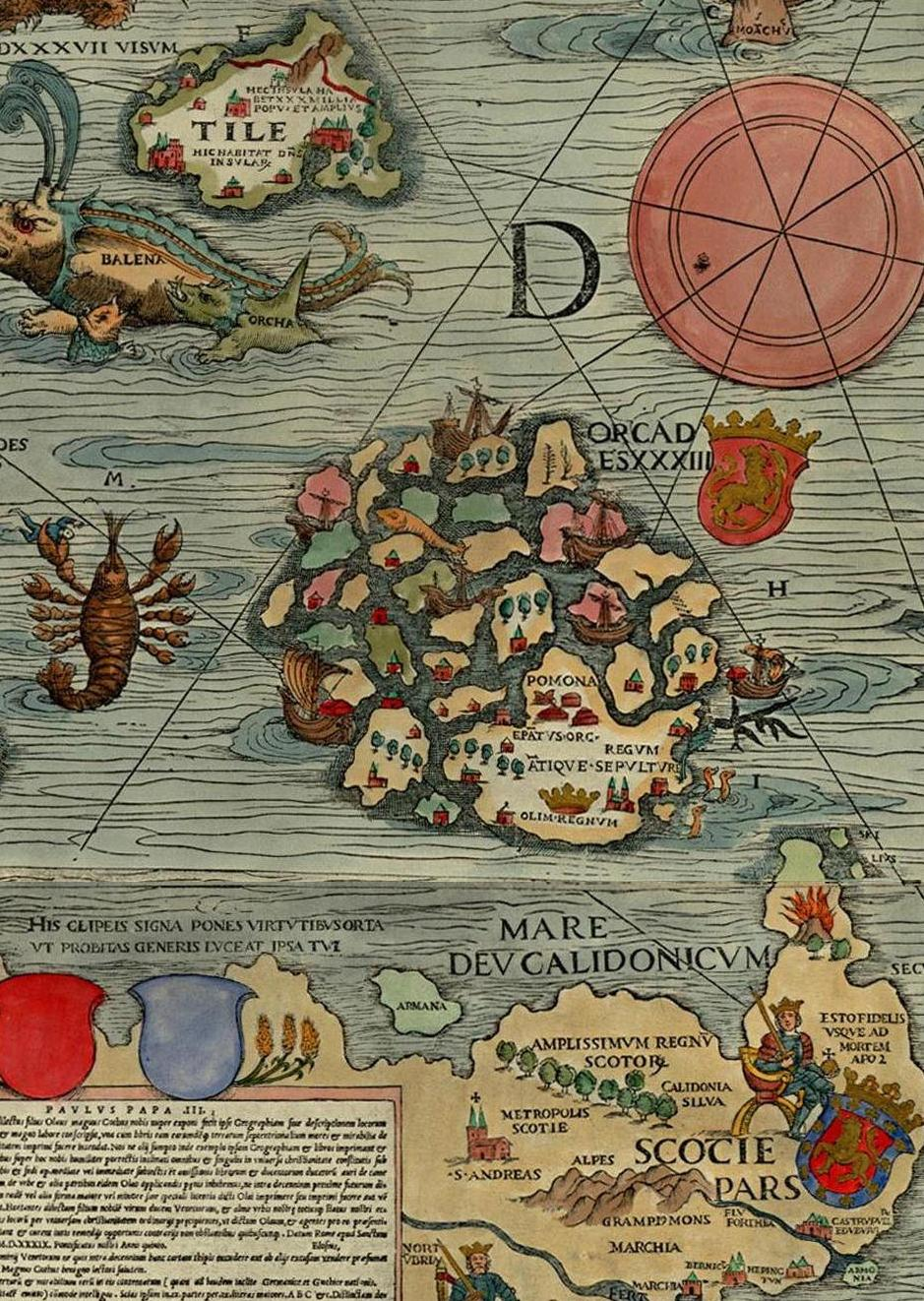
Mainland, as "Pomona" from the not wholly accurate Carta Marina of 1539.

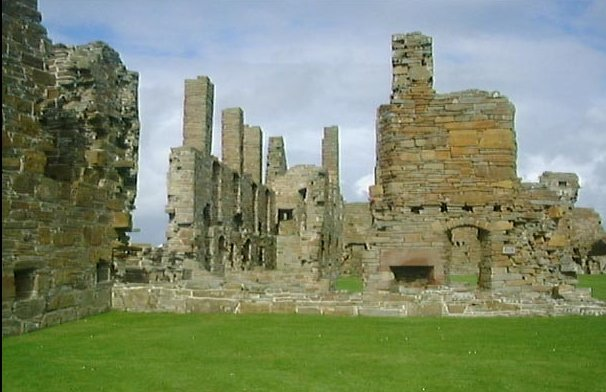
Earl's Palace, Birsay

The western section of the island contains numerous Neolithic and Pictish constructions.

Most of the best known Neoloithic ancient monuments are located in west Mainland, which includes the "Heart of Neolithic Orkney", a UNESCO World Heritage Site. This comprises the large chambered tomb of Maes Howe, the ceremonial stone circles the Standing Stones of Stenness and the Ring of Brodgar and the Neolithic village of Skara Brae, together with a number of unexcavated burial, ceremonial and settlement sites. The group constitutes a major prehistoric cultural landscape which gives a graphic depiction of life in the north of Scotland some 5,000 years ago. Nearby is the Barnhouse Settlement, a smaller cluster of prehistoric buildings.

Other sites of interest include St. Magnus Cathedral and the ruin of the Bishop's Palace in Kirkwall, the Earl's Palace, a ruined 16th-century castle in Birsay parish, and Skaill House, a manor house and museum near Skara Brae.

Viking settlers comprehensively occupied Orkney, and Mainland became a possession of Norway until being given to Scotland during the 15th century as part of a dowry settlement. Evidence of the Viking presence is widespread, and includes the site of a settlement at the Brough of Birsay, the vast majority of place names, and runic inscriptions at Maeshowe and other ancient sites.

Stromness is of relatively recent origin, being first recorded as the site of an inn in the 16th century, although the name is of Norse origin. Stromness became important during the late 17th century, when England was at war with France and shipping was forced to avoid the English Channel. Ships of the Hudson's Bay Company were regular visitors, as were whaling fleets.

The Churchill Barriers are a series of four causeways with a total length of 1.5 miles (2.4 km). They link the south of Mainland in the north to the island of South Ronaldsay via Burray and the two smaller islands of Lamb Holm and Glimps Holm. On 14 October 1939, the Royal Navy battleship HMS Royal Oak was sunk at her moorings within the natural harbour of Scapa Flow, by the German U-boat U-47 under the command of Günther Prien. U-47 had entered Scapa Flow through Holm Sound, one of several eastern entrances to Scapa Flow. To prevent further attacks, Winston Churchill ordered the construction of permanent barriers. They now serve as road links, carrying the A961. Work began in May 1940 and the barriers were completed in September 1944, but were not officially opened until 12 May 1945, four days after the end of World War II in Europe.

== Climate ==
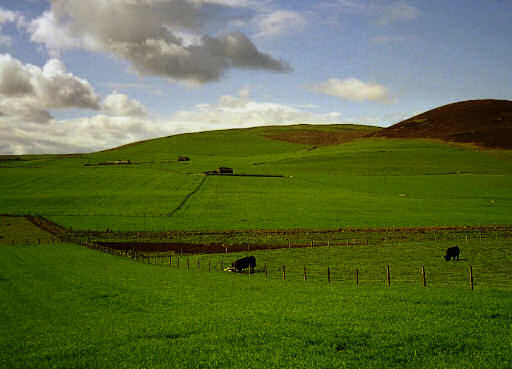
Farmland at Yesnaby. Much of Orkney was improved and drained during the 18th and 19th century, giving the islands the green appearance that they often have today.

The climate is remarkably temperate and steady for such a northerly latitude. The average temperature for the year is 8 °C (46 °F), for winter 4 °C (39 °F) and for summer 12 °C (54 °F).

The average annual rainfall varies from 850 to 940 mm (33 to 37 in). Fogs occur during summer and early autumn, and furious gales may be expected four or five times in the year.

To tourists, one of the fascinations of the islands is their nightless summers. On the longest day, the sun rises at 03:00 and sets at 21:29 GMT and darkness is unknown. It is possible to read at midnight and very few stars can be seen in the night sky. Winter, however, is long. On the shortest day the sun rises at 09:05 and sets at 15:16.

== Transportation and infrastructure ==
=== Road ===
Mainland contains the vast majority of the island's roads, and is also connected to those on the main south east islands, such as South Ronaldsay and Burray thanks to the Churchill Barriers.

There are ideas being discussed to build the Orkney Tunnel, an undersea tunnel between Orkney and the Scottish Mainland, at a length of about 9–10 miles (14–16 km) or (more likely) one connecting Orkney Mainland to Shapinsay. The Orkney-Caithness route would be connected to Mainland, via the Churchill Barriers, but would make landfall on South Ronaldsay, if constructed.

=== Air ===
The main airport in Orkney is Kirkwall Airport, operated by Highland and Islands Airports. Loganair provides services to the Scottish Mainland (Aberdeen, Edinburgh, Glasgow and Inverness), as well as to Sumburgh Airport in Shetland. Most of the scheduled flights within Orkney depart/arrive at Kirkwall from one of the other islands.

=== Ferry ===
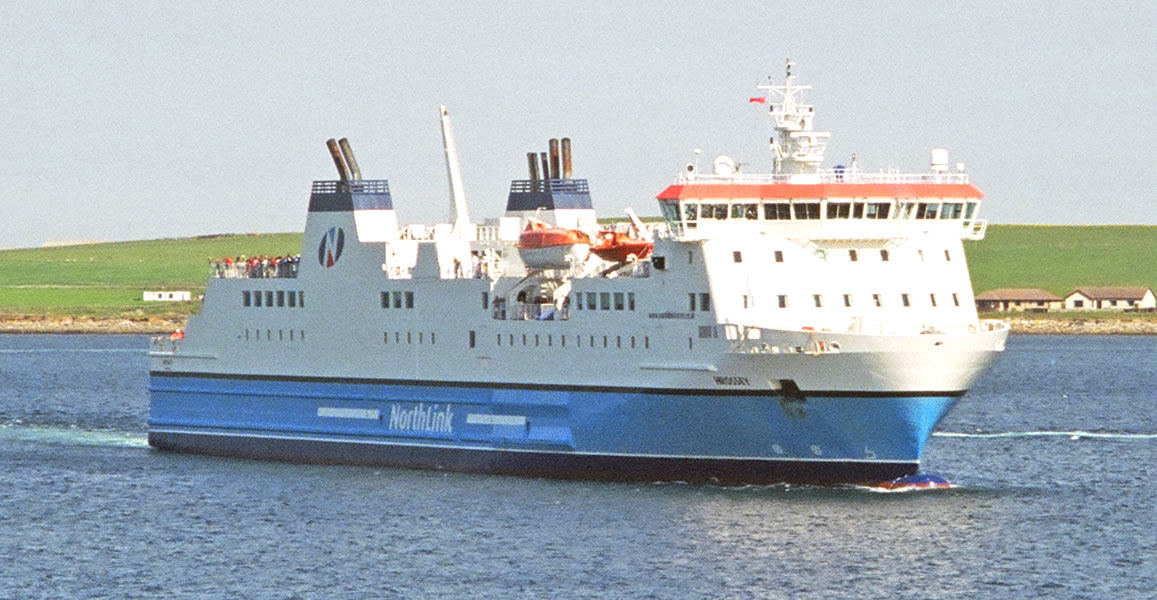
NorthLink Ferries - MV Hrossey

Ferries serve both to link Orkney to the rest of Scotland, and also to link together the various islands of the Orkney archipelago. Ferry services operate between Orkney and the Scottish Mainland and Shetland on the following routes:

- Lerwick to Kirkwall (operated by NorthLink Ferries)
- Aberdeen to Kirkwall (operated by NorthLink Ferries)
- Scrabster to Stromness (operated by NorthLink Ferries)
- Gills Bay to St Margaret's Hope (operated by Pentland Ferries)

Two services also connect Caithness, with South Ronaldsay, which is in turn connected to Mainland by road.

Inter-island ferry services connect all the inhabited islands to Orkney Mainland, and are operated by Orkney Ferries, a company owned by Orkney Islands Council.

== Flora and fauna ==
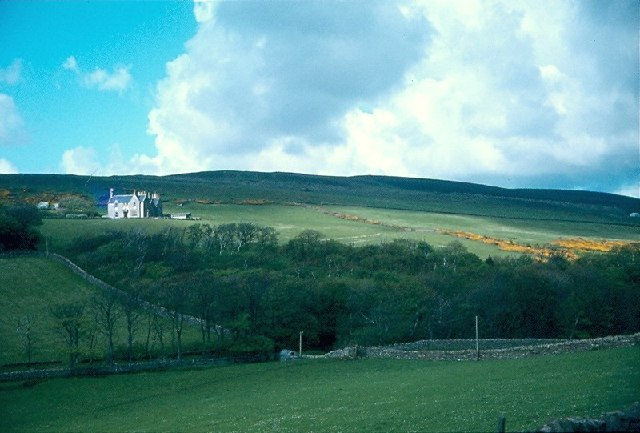
Most of Mainland is treeless, but there are woods at Kirkwall and elsewhere, including Binscarth Woods in Finstown.

Mainland has a great deal of marine life surrounding it, especially seabirds. Corncrakes can also be found in some parts. The Loch of Harray can host up to 10,000 wintering duck and is important for pochard. Some 4,000 ha of Mainland’s moorland has been designated an Important Bird Area (IBA) by BirdLife International because it supports populations of red-throated loons, short-eared owls, hen harriers and merlins.

There are few wild land mammals although there is an endemic sub-species of the common vole, the Orkney vole or cuttick, (Microtus arvalis orcadensis) found only in the Orkney archipelago. It may have been introduced by early settlers about 4,000 years ago. Brown hares and rabbits can be found and there are frogs, but no toads.

There are six hundred recorded species of plant on the Orkney Mainland. Two rarities to be found here are the oyster plant (Mertensia maritima) and the Scottish primrose (Primula scotica). The latter is endemic to the north coast of Scotland, including Orkney and nearby Caithness. It is closely related to the Arctic species Primula stricta and Primula scandinavica.

== Notable people from Mainland ==
- William Balfour Baikie, explorer, naturalist and philologist (Kirkwall)
- Thomas Clouston, psychiatrist (Birsay)
- Stanley Cursiter, painter (Kirkwall)
- Magnus Erlendsson, Earl of Orkney
- John Firth, author of Reminiscences of an Orkney Parish
- Rögnvald Kali Kolsson, who initiated the building of St. Magnus Cathedral
- George Mackay Brown, writer, (Stromness)
- Eric Linklater, writer, (Kirkwall)
- Ernest Marwick, antiquarian, (Evie)
- Edwin Muir, writer and translator, (Deerness)
- John Rae, Arctic explorer (Orphir)
- Cameron Stout, TV personality (Stromness)
- Thomas Stewart Traill, professor of medical jurisprudence at the University of Edinburgh (Kirkwall)
- William Walls, lawyer, industrialist and Dean of Guild of Glasgow (Kirkwall)

== Gallery ==
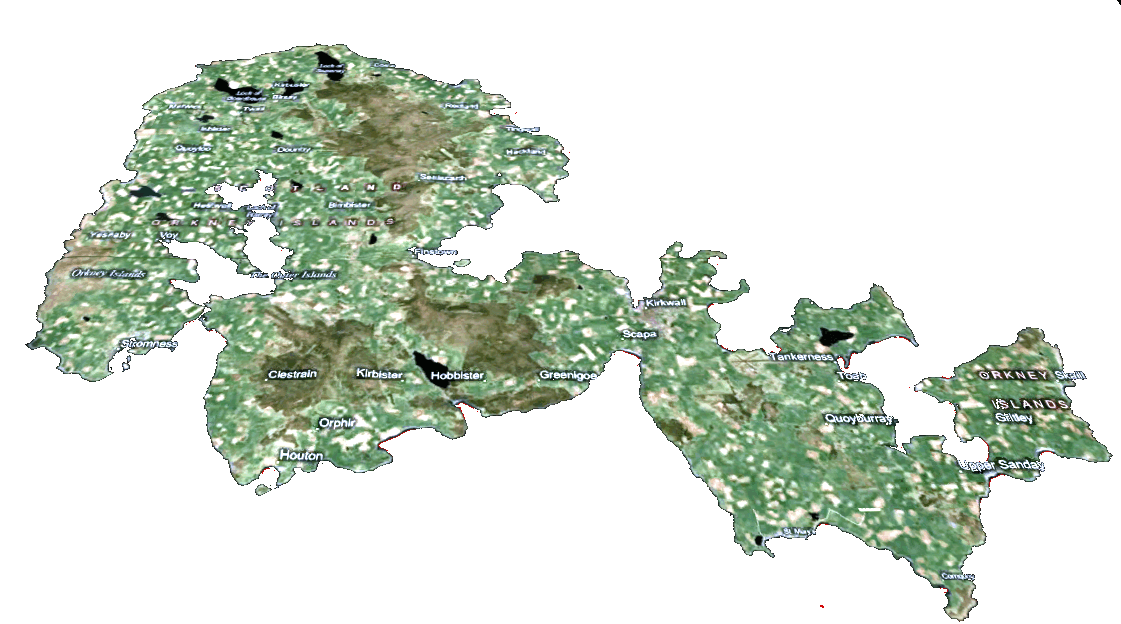
Mainland

Sea Arch at Yesnaby

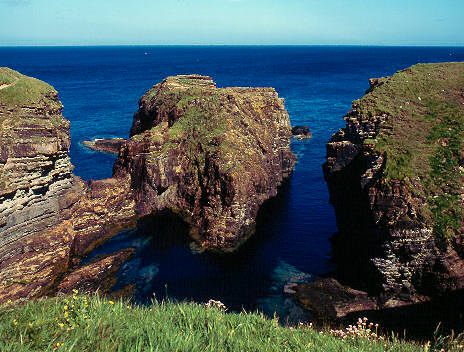
Brough of Deerness

== See also ==
- Geology of Orkney
- List of islands of Scotland
- List of places in Orkney
- Mainland, Shetland
