= Burray =

Island of the Orkney Islands, Scotland

Location
- Burray shown within the Orkney Islands
- OS grid reference: ND460963
- Coordinates: 58°51′09″N 2°54′54″W

Name
- Old Norse name: Borgarey

Physical geography
- Island group: Orkney
- Area: 903 ha (3.5 sq mi)
- Area rank: 55
- Highest elevation: 80 m (262 ft)

Administration
- Council area: Orkney Islands
- Country: Scotland
- Sovereign state: United Kingdom

Demographics
- Population: 445
- Population rank: 23
- Population density: 49 people/km^{2}
- Largest settlement: Burray Village

Burray (/ˈbʌriː/) is one of the Orkney Islands in Scotland. It lies to the east of Scapa Flow and is one of a chain of islands linked by the Churchill Barriers.

== Geography and geology ==
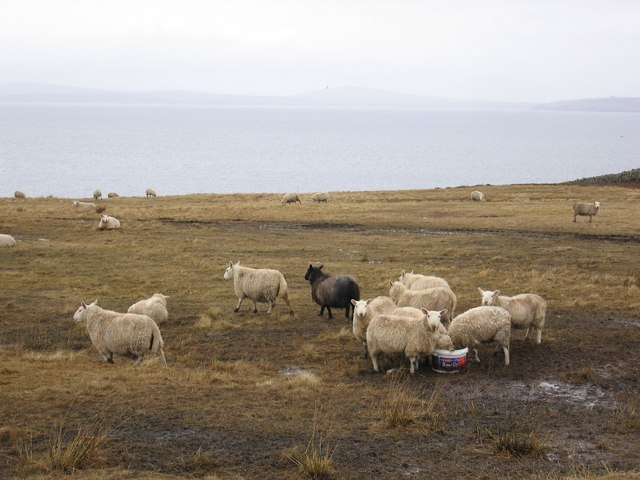
Sheep on Burray

Burray lies between Mainland, Orkney and South Ronaldsay, and is linked to both by the Churchill Barriers. Barriers 1, 2, and 3 connect Burray with Mainland, Orkney via the islets of Glimps Holm and Lamb Holm in Holm Sound to the north east. Barrier 4 links to South Ronaldsay, across Water Sound. To the west is the tidal island of Hunda, also joined by a causeway. Further west, across Scapa Flow, are the islands of Flotta and Calf of Flotta, approximately 6 kilometres (3.7 mi) away.

In 2001, the population of Burray was 357, a total that had grown to 409 by 2011 and to 445 by 2022. The main settlement, Burray Village, is a former fishing port on the south west coast. There are also settlements of Northtown, Southtown and Hillside on the island.

Burray is made up of Old Red Sandstone of the Devonian period. The island is indented in the north west by Echnaloch Bay, which takes its name from Echna Loch. Burray Ness and Burray Haas are two headlands in the east.

== Visitor attractions ==
Attractions in Burray include the Fossil and Heritage Centre at Viewforth.

The island has a reasonable amount of birdlife, with Eurasian curlew, herring and lesser black-backed gulls breeding here.

== History ==
=== Viking history ===
One of the largest Viking hoards in Scotland was discovered on 22 April 1889 by Mr G. Petrie, Little Wart, Burray when he was peat-cutting in the North Town Moss. It consisted of over 140 items of silver bullion, including many fragments of arm ring or 'ring-money', and about a dozen coins The date proposed for deposition is c. 998.

=== Ecclesiastical land ===
In 1494/5 Bishop Andrew of Orkney was granted Burray by James IV. Bishop Andrew's successor Bishop Reid leased Burray and Flotta out on 19 year leases, a practice that had become common in Orkney in order to avoid the bishopric becoming too involved in the direct management of the land.

=== Sir James Stewart ===
During the early 18th century, the laird of Burray was Sir James Stewart, who commenced significant agricultural improvements in a 170 hectares (420 acres) enclosure called the Park of Cara. (Note: Park of Cara was a rectangular enclosure at the northern end of South Ronaldsay overlooking Burray.) Stewart was responsible for the murder of a political rival, James Moodie of Melsetter, in Kirkwall in 1725, and went on the run for twenty years. A Jacobite sympathiser, he fought in the Battle of Culloden and was one of the few survivors. However, when he returned to Burray after the battle, he happened to chance upon the son of the murder victim, who reported him to the authorities. Stewart was arrested for treason (rather than murder), and ended up dying in a prison cell in London in June 1746.

The novelist Mary Brunton was born Mary Balfour on Burray on 1 November 1778.

=== Fishing ===
The Annual Reports of the Fishery Board for Scotland provide an insight into fishing in Burray in the years before the First World War. In 1913 the Board reported that the fishermen in Burray were "crofter fishermen. Fifteen local crews prosecuted the herring fishing with good results".

Fishery Statistics

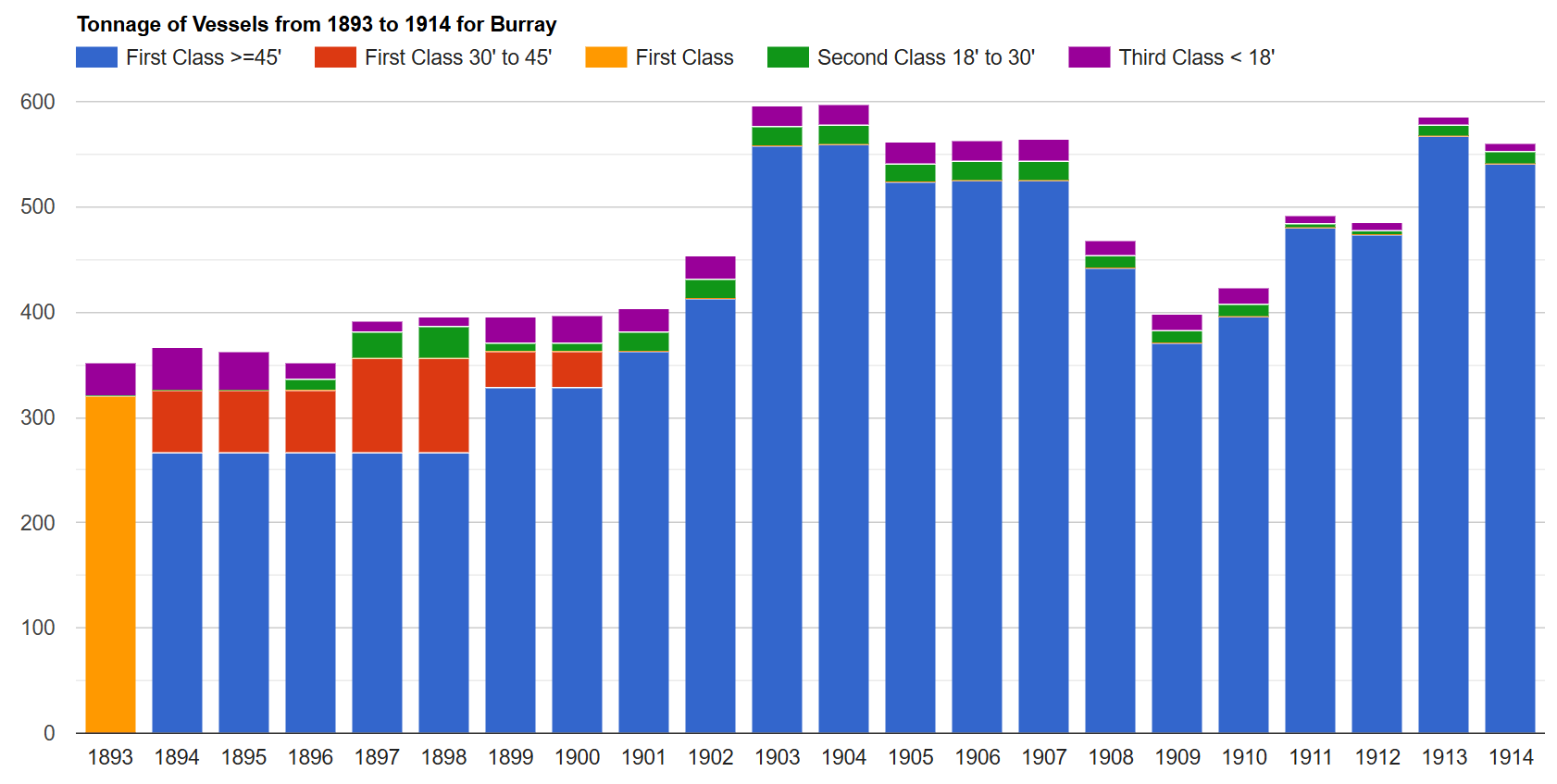
Tonnage of vessels

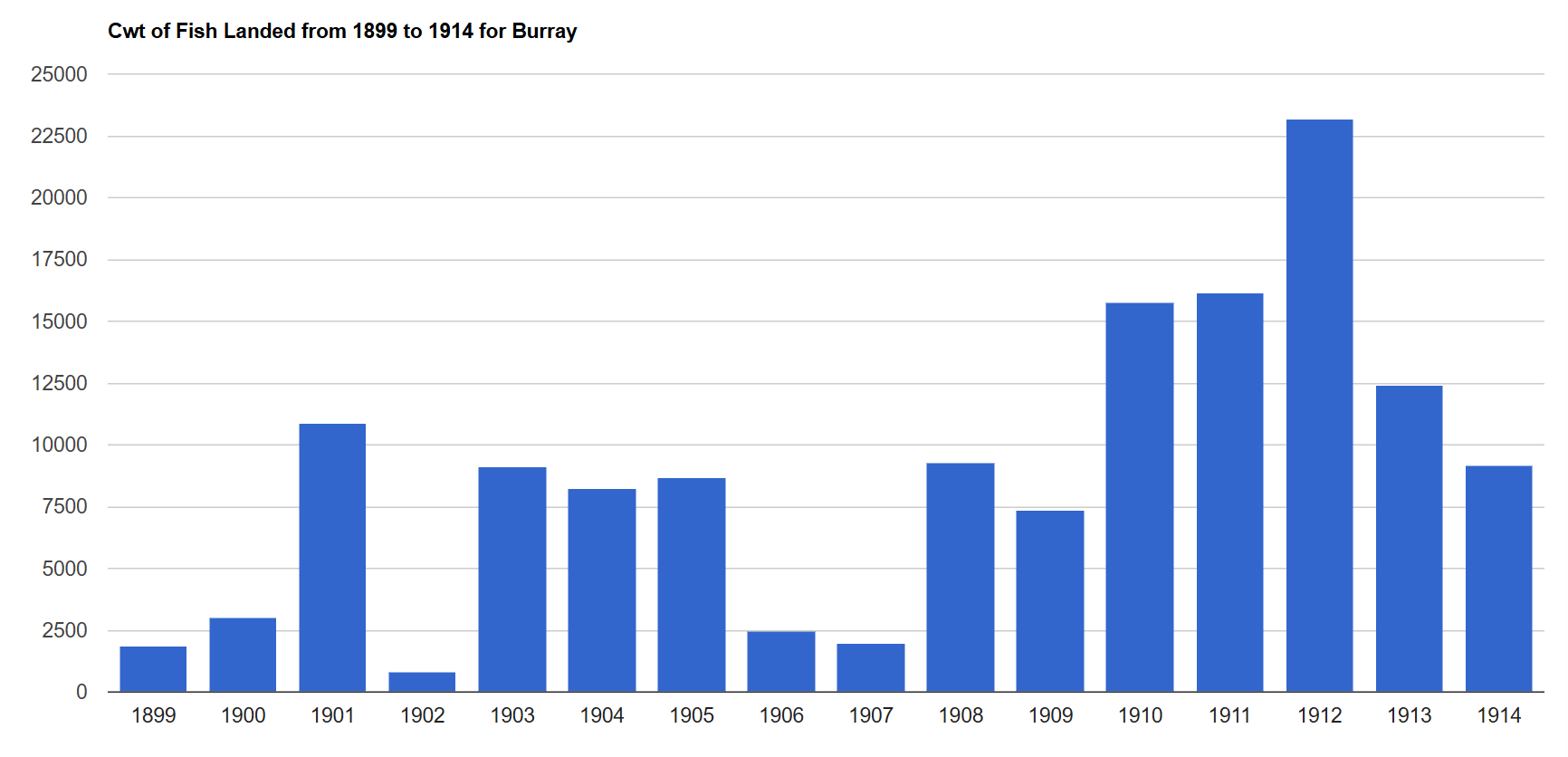
Cwt of fish landed

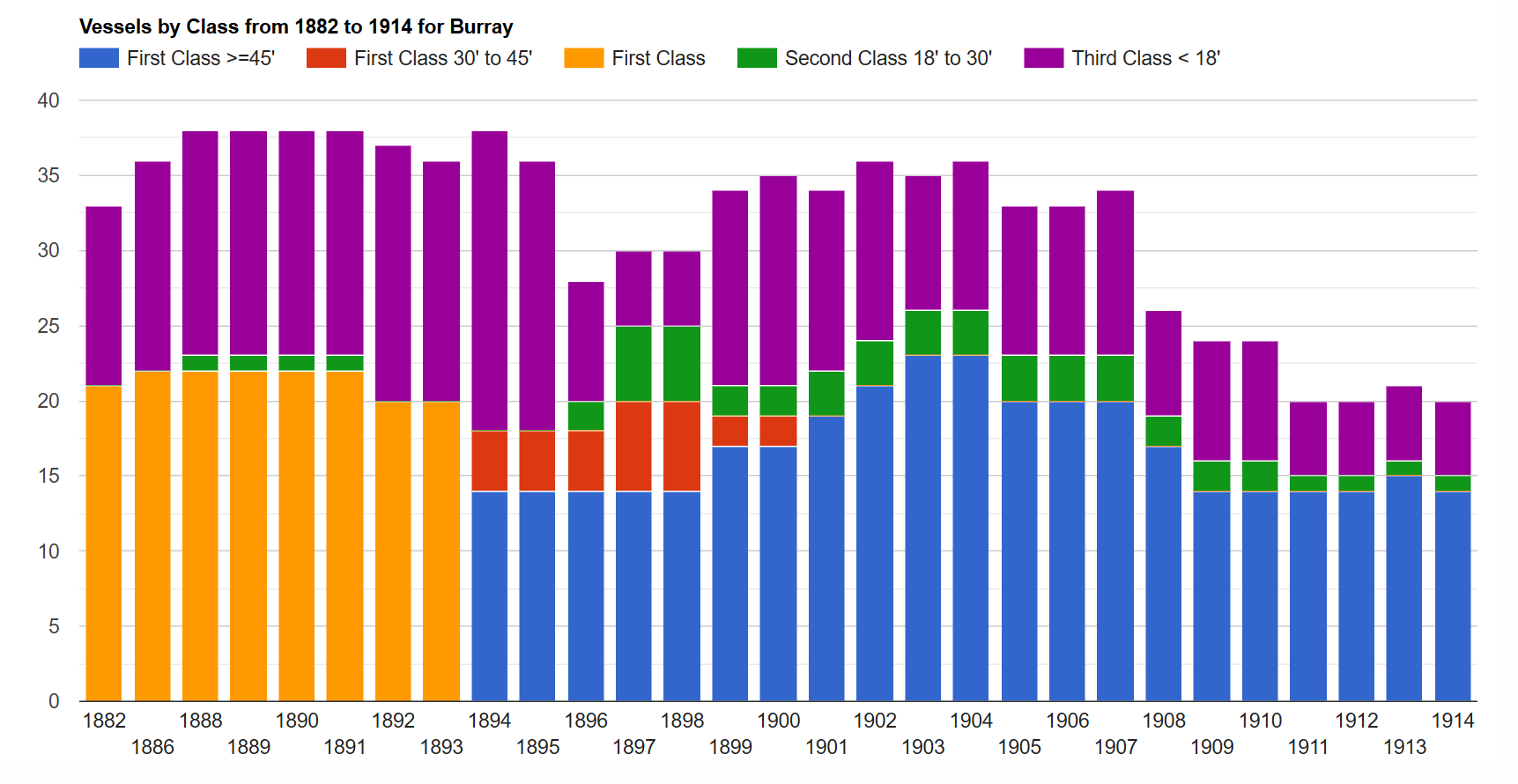
Vessels by class

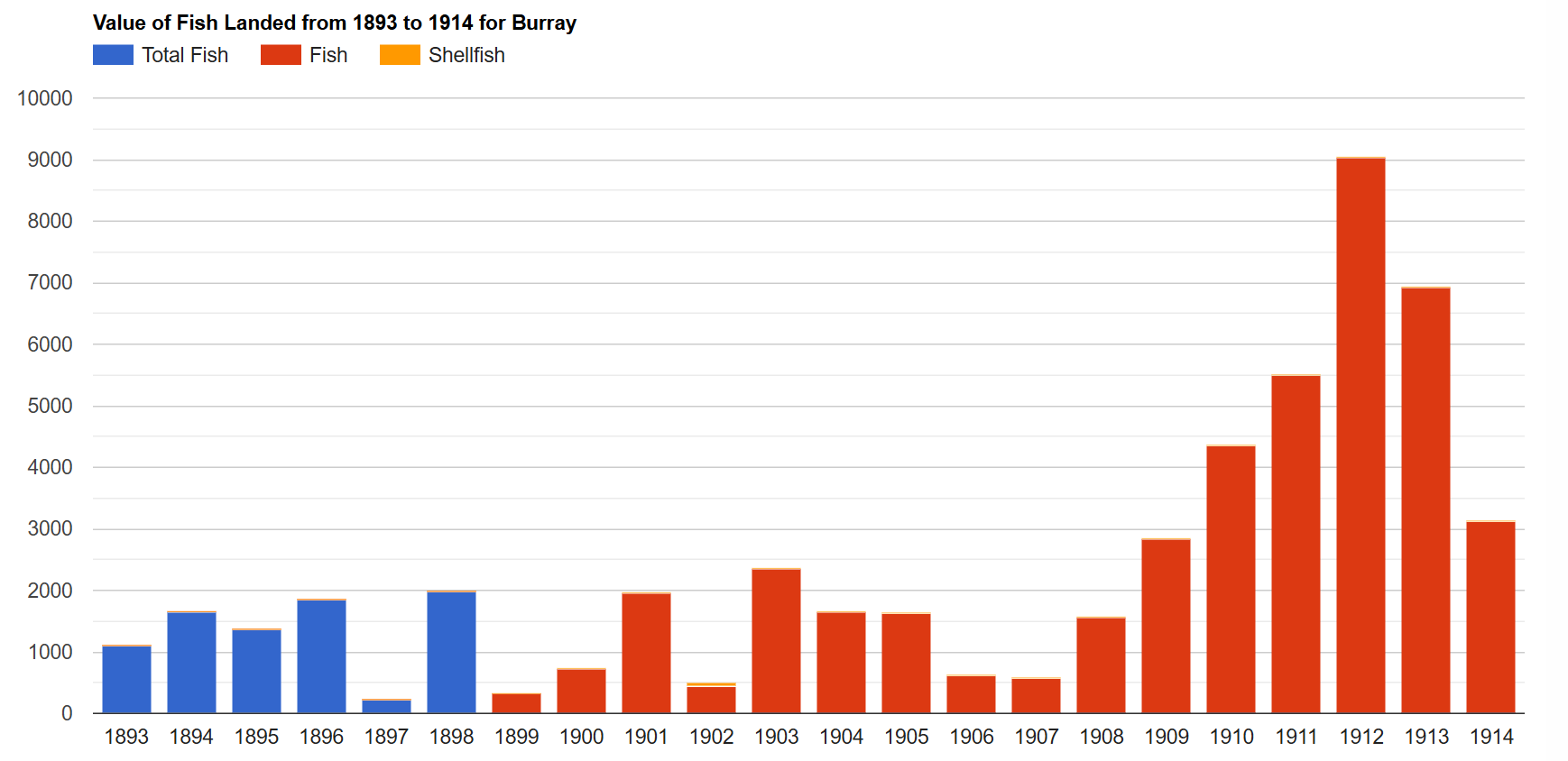
Value (£) of fish landed

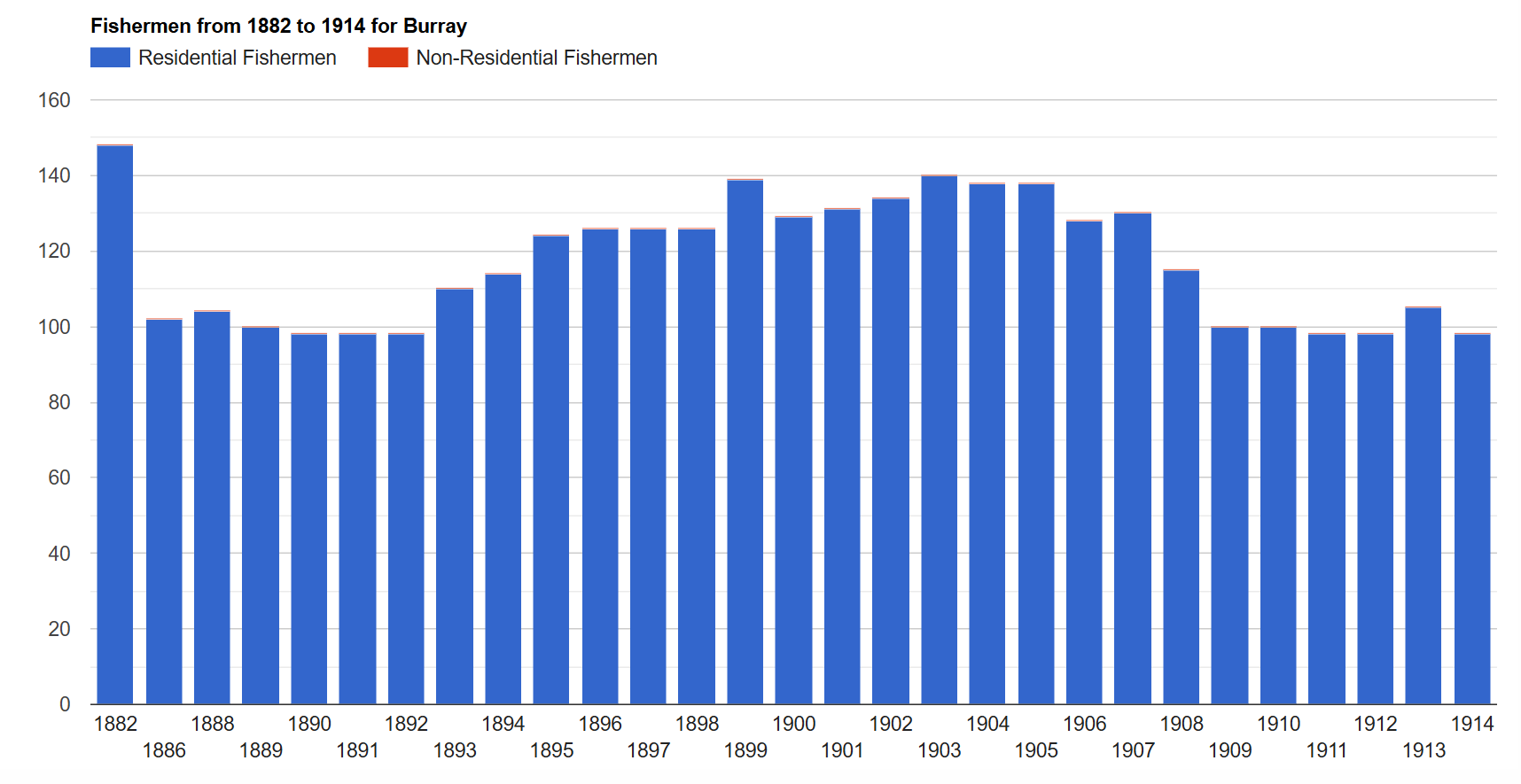
Fishermen

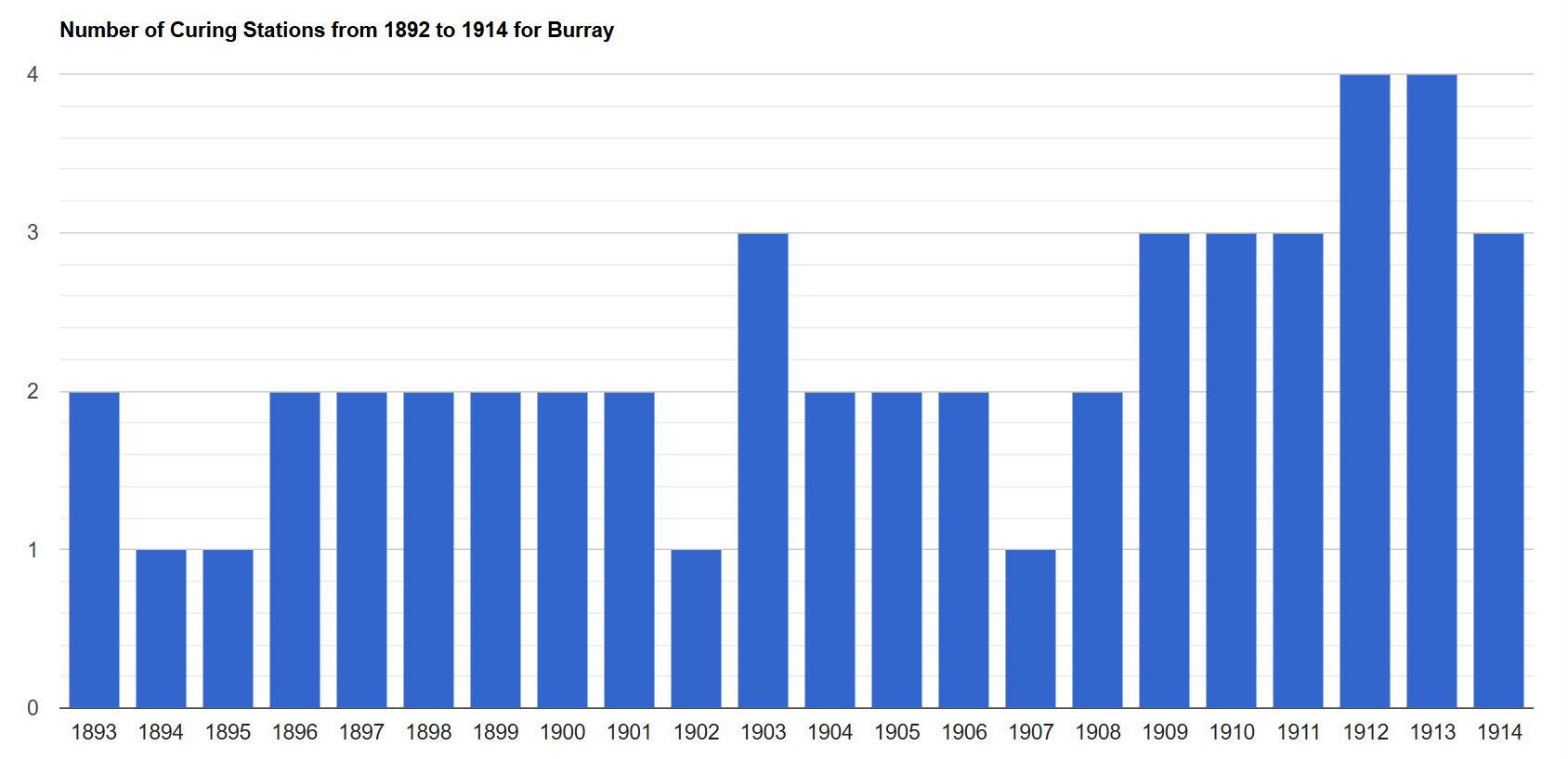
Number of curing stations

=== WWII and construction of Churchill Barriers ===
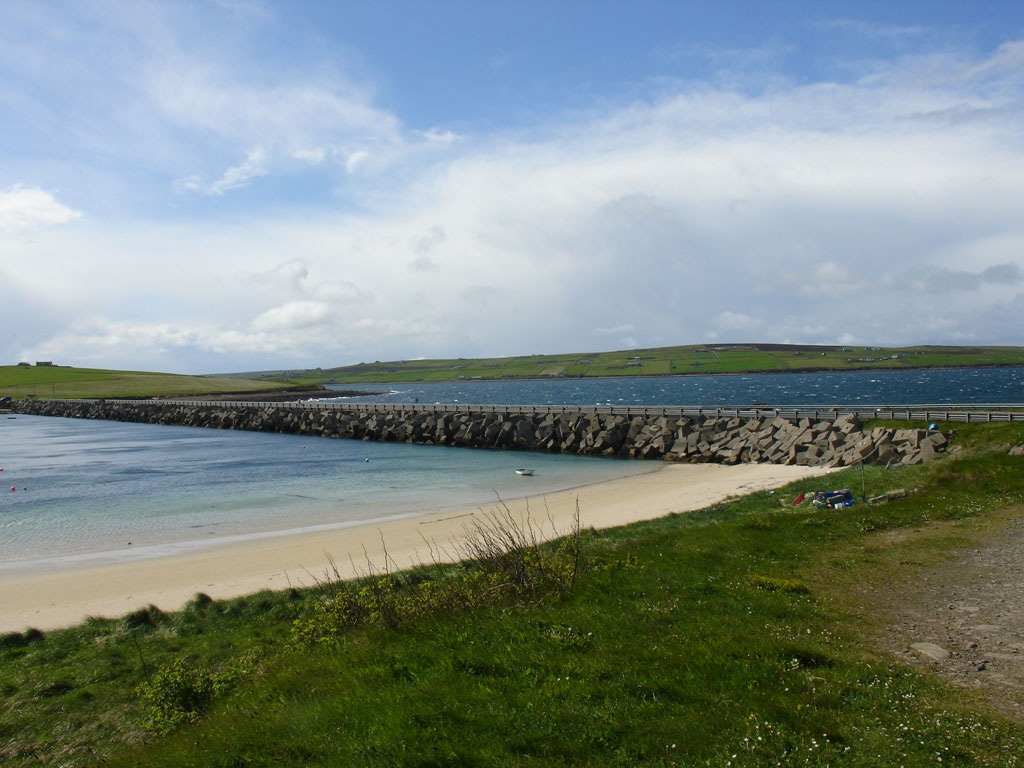
Churchill Barrier 3, linking Glimps Holm and Burray

On 14 October 1939, the Royal Navy battleship HMS Royal Oak was sunk at her moorings within the natural harbour of Scapa Flow, by the German submarine U-47 under the command of Günther Prien. U-47 had entered Scapa Flow through Holm Sound, just to the north of Burray, one of several eastern entrances to Scapa Flow. The eastern passages were protected by measures including sunken block ships, booms and anti-submarine nets, but U-47 entered at night at high tide by navigating between the block ships.

To prevent further attacks, the First Lord of the Admiralty, Winston Churchill ordered the construction of permanent barriers. Work began in May 1940 and the barriers were completed in September 1944, but were not officially opened until 12 May 1945, four days after the end of World War II.

The Churchill Barriers project required a substantial labour force, which peaked in 1943 at over two thousand. Much of the labour was provided by around 1200 Italian prisoners of war, who had been captured in the desert war in North Africa, who were transported to Orkney from early 1942 onwards. As the use of POW labour for War Effort works is prohibited under the Geneva Conventions, the works were justified as 'improvements to communications' to the southern Orkney Islands.

The prisoners were accommodated in two camps, some at Camp 34 at Warebanks on Burray and the rest at Camp 60 on Lamb Holm where the famous Italian Chapel was built. Camp 34 had its own chapel but this was destroyed at the end of the war with the rest of the camp. Photos exist of Camp 34's football team and band.

== See also ==
- List of islands of Scotland
