= Glimps Holm =

Small uninhabited islet in Orkney, Scotland

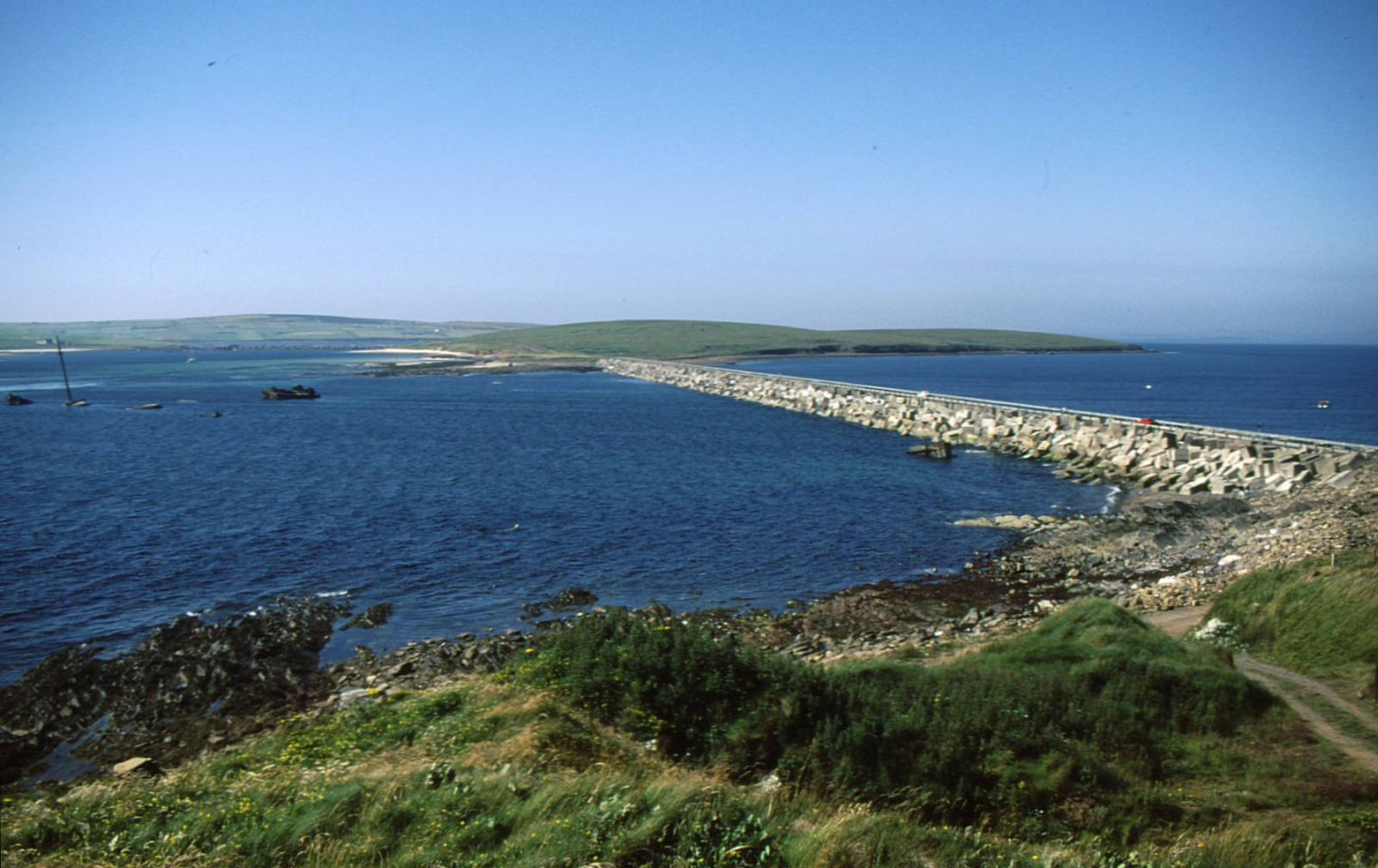
- View of Glimps Holm from Lamb Holm, showing Barrier No. 2

Location
- Glimps Holm shown within Orkney
- OS grid reference: ND472991
- Coordinates: 58.88°N 2.91°W

Physical geography
- Island group: Orkney
- Area: 55 hectares (0.21 sq mi)
- Area rank: 189=
- Highest elevation: 32 metres (105 ft)

Administration
- Council area: Orkney Islands
- Country: Scotland
- Sovereign state: United Kingdom

Demographics
- Population: 0

Glimps Holm or Glims Holm is a small uninhabited islet in Orkney, Scotland. It lies in Holm Sound, one of the eastern entrances to Scapa Flow, between Mainland Orkney and the island of Burray. Nearby is Lamb Holm. The two are linked by Churchill Barrier No. 2, one of a series of causeways built during World War II to protect Scapa Flow from U-boats. Barrier No. 3 links Glimps Holm to Burray.
