= Heritage tourism =

Tourism based on cultural heritage sites

Heritage tourism is a specific type of tourism that focuses on the exploration and appreciation of a region's cultural, historical, and environmental heritage. This form of tourism includes both tangible elements, such as historically significant sites, monuments, and artifacts, and intangible aspects, including traditions, customs, and practices.

A specific subset of heritage tourism, cultural heritage tourism, emphasises the human dimension of these sites, focusing on the traditions, practices, and values that are deeply connected to them. Likewise, heritage tourism focuses specifically on the history of a region, as well as its natural heritage.

Heritage tourism can look like visiting historically significant locations, engaging with local traditions (Folklore), and gaining insights into the historical and contemporary aspects of a community, culture or religion.

Consequently, heritage tourism also underscores the importance of preserving cultural and historical resources. This can be extremely beneficial for a region, not only by helping in the preservation of vital customs and culture, but also by contributing to the economic development and sustainability of the area.

== History ==
In some Christian and Islamic traditions, the purpose of a pilgrimage was often to honor the shrine of a prophet or saint, such as that of Muhammad in Mecca during the Islamic pilgrimages of the Hajj and Umrah. Other popular pilgrimage sites in Europe included Lourdes in France and Canterbury in England. In some cases pilgrims contribute significantly to the economies of certain regions.

For example, the rediscovery of ancient Roman ruins at Pompeii and Herculaneum stimulated an interest in the civilizations of the ancient world and travel. Additionally, in the 19th century, there was an increase in tourism and in grand tours of Europe to historical sites. The concept of historical monument emerged in the Western world, accompanied by tourism.

=== UNESCO World Heritage Convention ===
Heritage tourism is promoted by the World Heritage Convention, which is a part of UNESCO. This stemmed from various safeguarding campaigns. The decision to build the Aswan High Dam in Egypt, including a plan to flood the valley containing the Abu Simbel temples, caused several conflicts.

In 1959, after an appeal from the governments of Egypt and Sudan, UNESCO launched an international safeguarding campaign. Archaeological research in the areas to be flooded was accelerated. And the Abu Simbel and Philae temples were dismantled, moved to dry ground, and reassembled. The campaign cost about 80 million US dollars, half of which was donated by some 50 countries.

Other safeguarding campaigns, such as saving Venetian Lagoon (Italy), the archaeological ruins at Mohenjo-daro (Pakistan), and restoring the Borobudur Temple Compounds (Indonesia), had been performed as well. Consequently, UNESCO initiated, with the help of the French cultural heritage organization, ICOMOS, the preparation of a draft convention on the protection of cultural heritage.

=== In China ===
Heritage tourism increased in China in the 1990s and resulted in more tourism to small towns.

== Cultural tourism ==
Community tourism in Sierra Leone

Culture, heritage and the arts have contributed to the appeal of tourist destinations. Cultural heritage tourists might travel to see performances and productions of intangible heritage associated with the history of certain regions. Revenue from this form of tourism can be transferred to local economies, but this form of tourism can also appropriate cultural heritage for entertainment. Heritage tourism can sometimes be supported by municipalities through promotion and tourist information in their administrative units, e.g., cities such as Poland's Warsaw.

== Forms ==
Cultural heritage tourism involves visits to immovable historic sites which might include industrial sites such as fortifications, transportation facilities, and other sites that might show the technologies of the past. The purchase of cultural goods, including numismatic coins, antiquarian books, and antiques, can also be associated with heritage tourism when collectors travel to those locations.

Tourism organizations in these regions can offer specialized visits that allow tourists to experience the gastronomic heritage associated with multiple brands. For example, Brittany (France) is associated with Galette, while Normandy is associated with Calvados. In the United States, the region known as the Old Bourbon is associated with Bourbon whiskey production.

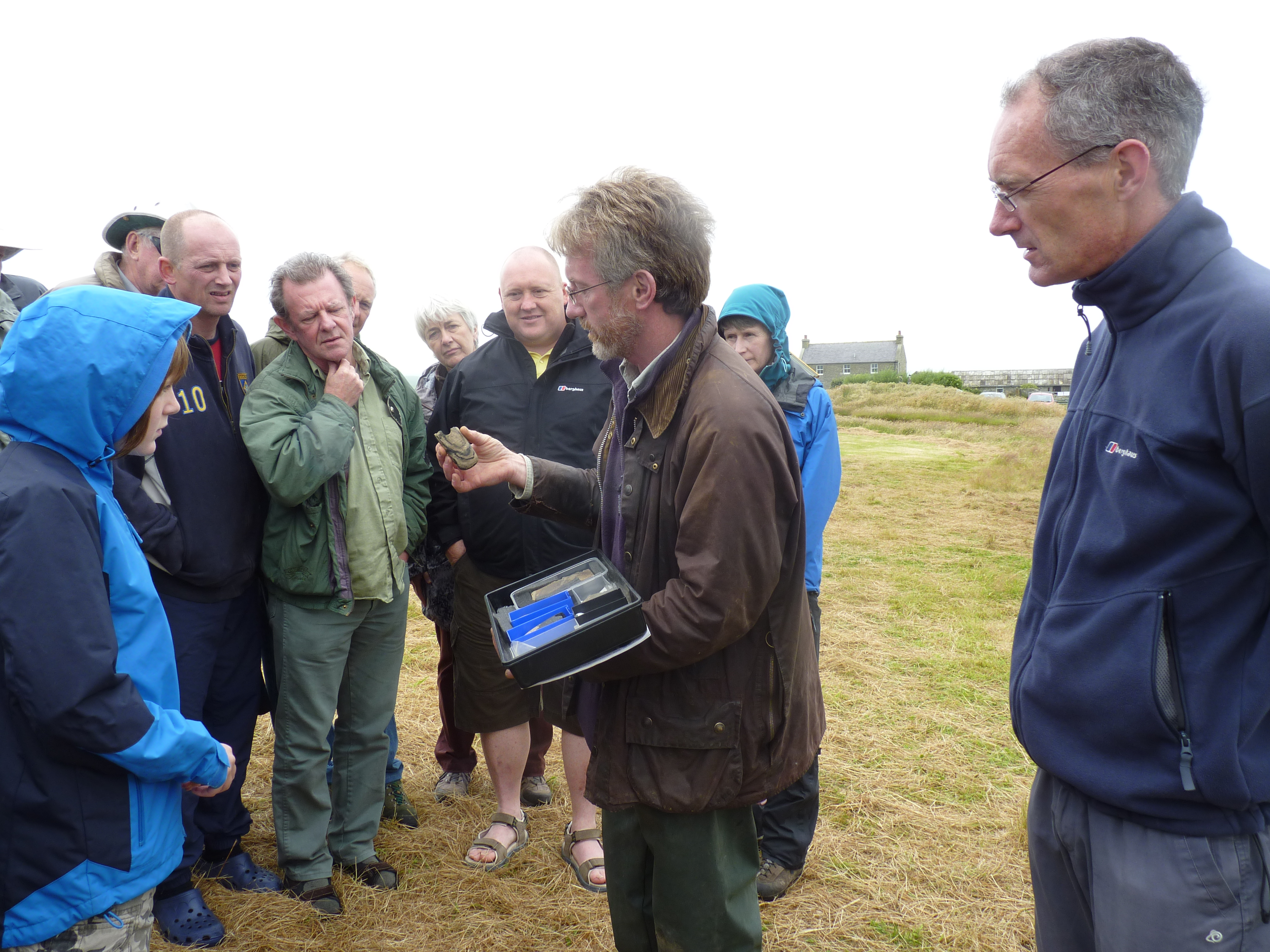
An archaeologist from the UHI Archaeology Institute with heritage tourists at the Ness of Brodgar

Natural heritage tourism involves visits to natural features consisting of physical and biological formations or groups of such formations, geological and physiographical formations and precisely delineated areas which constitute the habitat of threatened species of animals and plants, natural sites, or precisely delineated natural areas.

== Authenticity ==
Authenticity is a recurring concern in heritage tourism, both as something visitors seek and as something sites present. An influential early account argued that tourists pursue what they take to be the “back regions” of a destination, where life is assumed to be more genuine, and that tourist settings are frequently arranged so as to give the impression that such a region has been entered when it has not, a phenomenon termed staged authenticity.

Much subsequent research has examined heritage authenticity from the visitor’s point of view. A complementary line of work approaches it from the producer’s side, that is, from the position of the heritage manager whose decisions shape what is presented. One such account conceptualises the cultural heritage object as having three overlapping attributes — its physical form, its links to what is culturally and historically significant, and its vitality in actively transmitting meaning — and treats the authenticity a site produces as a matter of the indexical and iconic cues these attributes supply.

== Consequences ==
The effect on indigenous peoples whose land and culture are being visited by tourists has been considered a problem. In Mexico, tourism increased because of the predicted end of the Maya calendar. Some activists claim the indigenous Maya are not benefiting from the traffic. However, heritage tourism has sometimes contributed to the economies of certain regions, for example, heritage tourism contributed 50 million pounds to Orkney's economy in 2017.

Colonial officials employed fieldworkers' notes, books and fieldwork to understand aboriginal people.

== See also ==
- Heritage interpretation
- Heritage centre
- List of heritage railways
- World Heritage Site
- Genealogy tourism
- Dark tourism
- Overtourism
- Sustainable tourism
- IT.A.CÀ - Festival of Responsible Tourism
