= Ness of Brodgar =

British archaeological site

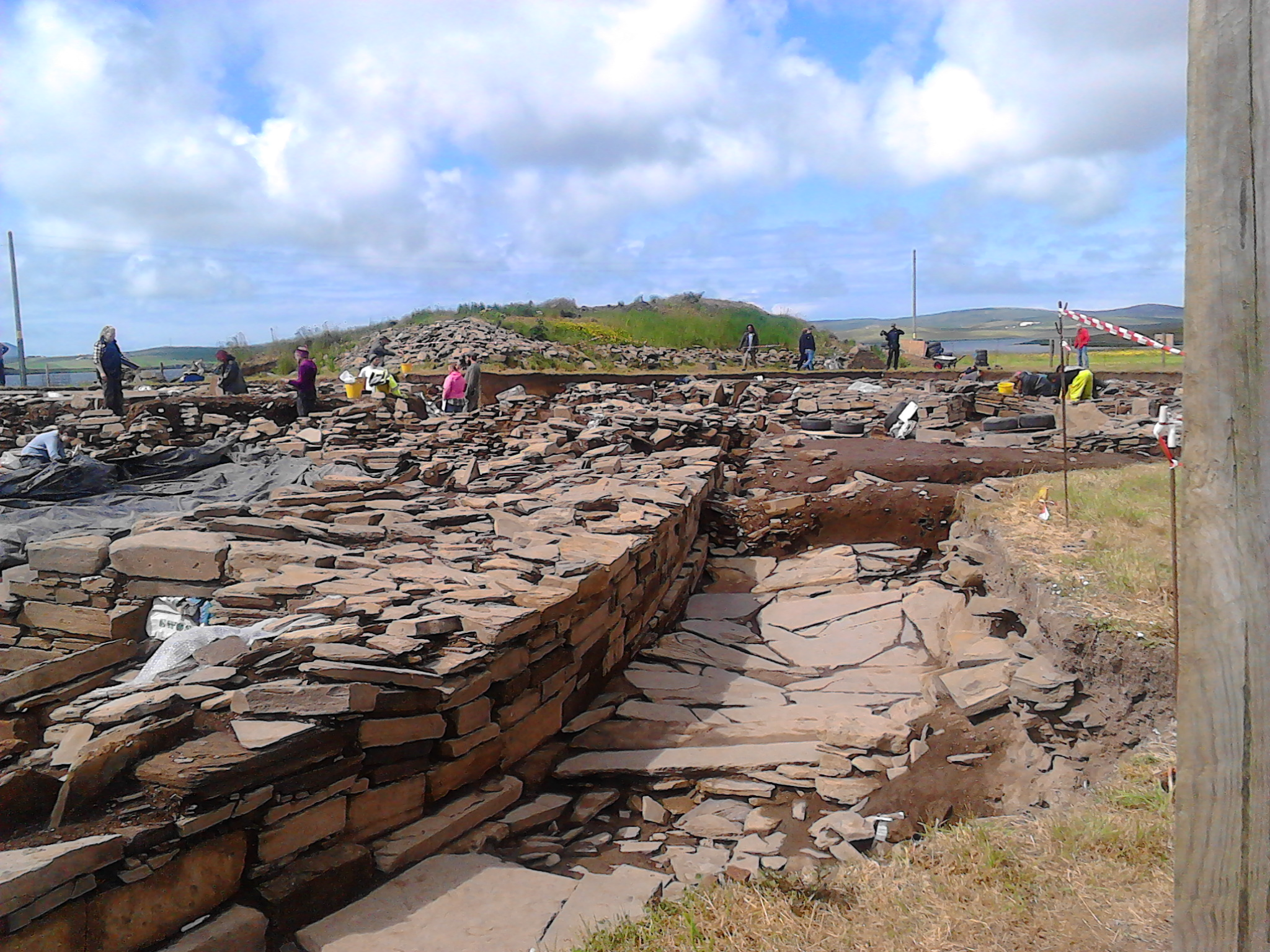
- The site in 2016

- Location in Scotland, United Kingdom
- 58°59′50″N 03°12′56″W
- Type: Settlement or religious site
- Periods: Neolithic
- Location: Mainland, Orkney, Scotland, United Kingdom

History
- Built: c. 3000 BC
- Abandoned: c. 2200 BC

Site notes
- Excavation dates: 2002-2024
- Archaeologists: Nick Card
- Owner: Ness of Brodgar Trust; also private ownership
- Public access: Only by guided tour during excavation

UNESCO World Heritage Site
- Type: Cultural
- Criteria: i, ii, iii, iv
- Designated: 1999 (23rd session)
- Part of: Heart of Neolithic Orkney
- Reference no.: 514
- Region: Europe and North America

The Ness of Brodgar is a Neolithic-era archaeological site covering 2.5 hectares (6.2 acres) located between the Ring of Brodgar and the Stones of Stenness in the Heart of Neolithic Orkney World Heritage Site on Mainland, Orkney, Scotland. Excavations took place from 2003 to 2024, after which the site was infilled to protect the exposed structures from environmental damage.

The site has provided evidence of decorated stone slabs, a stone wall 6 metres (20 ft) thick with foundations, and a large building described as a Neolithic temple. Activity at the site can be dated to around 3500–3400 BC. By 2200 BC, the site had been closed down and partially dismantled.

== Location ==
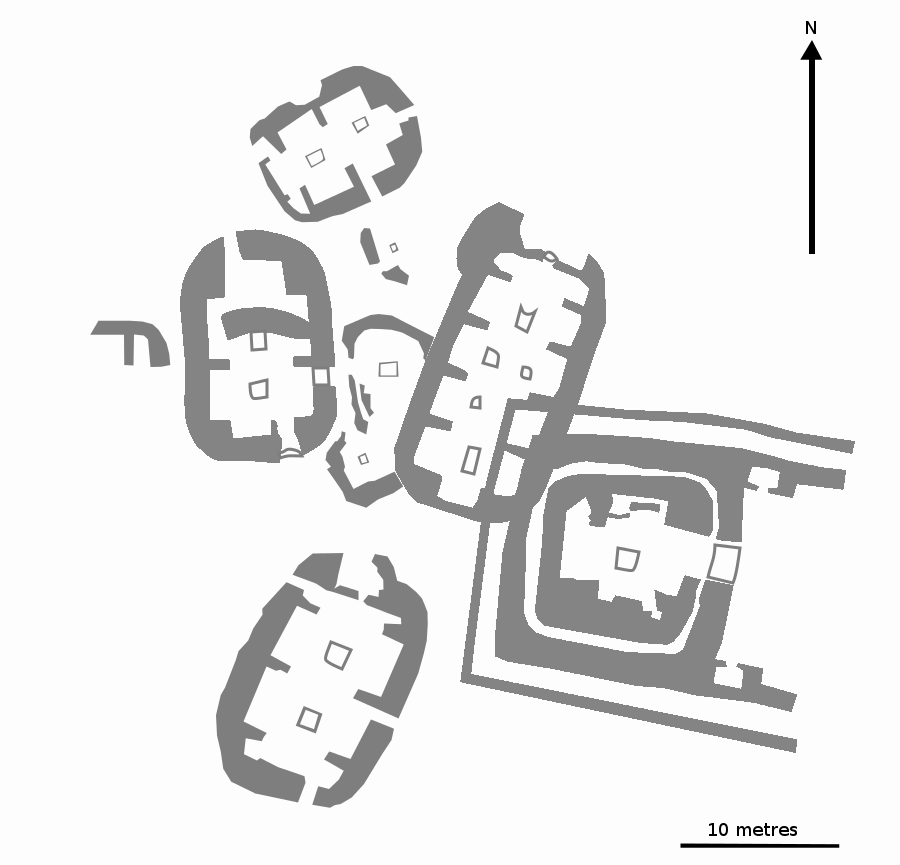
General plan of "Trench P" - the largest of several trenches on the site

Located off the West Mainland of Orkney, The Ness of Brodgar is the name of a peninsula that separates the freshwater Loch of Harray and brackish Loch of Stenness. Surrounded by windswept grassy plains and farmland, the Ness of Brodgar is located within the Heart of Neolithic Orkney World Heritage Site, an area revered for its grouping of well preserved neolithic monuments. The site spans about three hectares (about seven and a half acres), and contains the remains of a complex of Neolithic stone structures dating back to around 3000 BC.

Researchers claim that during the early Neolithic period, during the time the Ness of Brodgar buildings would have been constructed, the landscape surrounding the Ness of Brodgar and its neighbouring lakes was very different. Loch Stenness is predicted to have been less brackish, and the nearby landscape would have contained more mixed forests of birch, hazel, willow, oak, and pine. Both lakes would have had lower water levels, leading to theories that there may be additional buried Neolithic buildings beneath the lakes today. Over time, rising sea levels, storm surges, and agricultural land development changed the surrounding landscape into what it is today. People from Skara Brae would have been able to walk to the Ness of Brodgar, watch or take part in ritual activity and walk home within a day.

To the southeast are the Standing Stones of Stenness and to the north-west is the Ring of Brodgar. A short bridge connects these two sites. Also visible from the site are, to the east, the chambered cairn at Maeshowe and, to the southeast, the Barnhouse Settlement. A couple of kilometres northwest of the Ring of Brodgar is the Ring of Bookan, a third henge, with associated mounds. The Neolithic village at Skara Brae lies a few kilometres away, as does the chambered cairn at Unstan. More archaeology is likely submerged beneath the lochs.

== Structures ==
The structures at Brodgar are numbered in the order of discovery. As more of the site was uncovered and the interpretations improved, some numbers went out of use, so as of 2026 the main structures are numbered 1, 5, 8, 10, 12, 14, 26 and 27.

The structures currently visible are structures 1, 5, 8, 10, 12, 14, 26, 27, and part of 32. There are also past structures beneath them, and some buildings were destroyed, modified, or built over. Buildings that are no longer visible include structures 7, 11, 9, 16, 17, 18, 19, 20, 21, 22, 23, 28, 29, 30, 33, 34, and 36.

Starting in the early 2000s, the excavation of the Ness of Brodgar consisted of 10 trenches and 9 test pits. Excavation ended in August 2024. The trenches are labelled J, L, M, N, P, Q, R, T, X, and Y. The pits are labelled A, C, D, E, F, G, H, I, and K.

The structures are made of flagstone, a sedimentary rock found abundantly throughout Orkney. Flagstone is easily split into flat stones and was therefore a good material for fine building work using Neolithic tools. Some of the stone found on site is too thin for floor tiles or wall building, and is understood as the earliest evidence ever found of roofs.

=== Trench P ===
==== Structure 1 ====
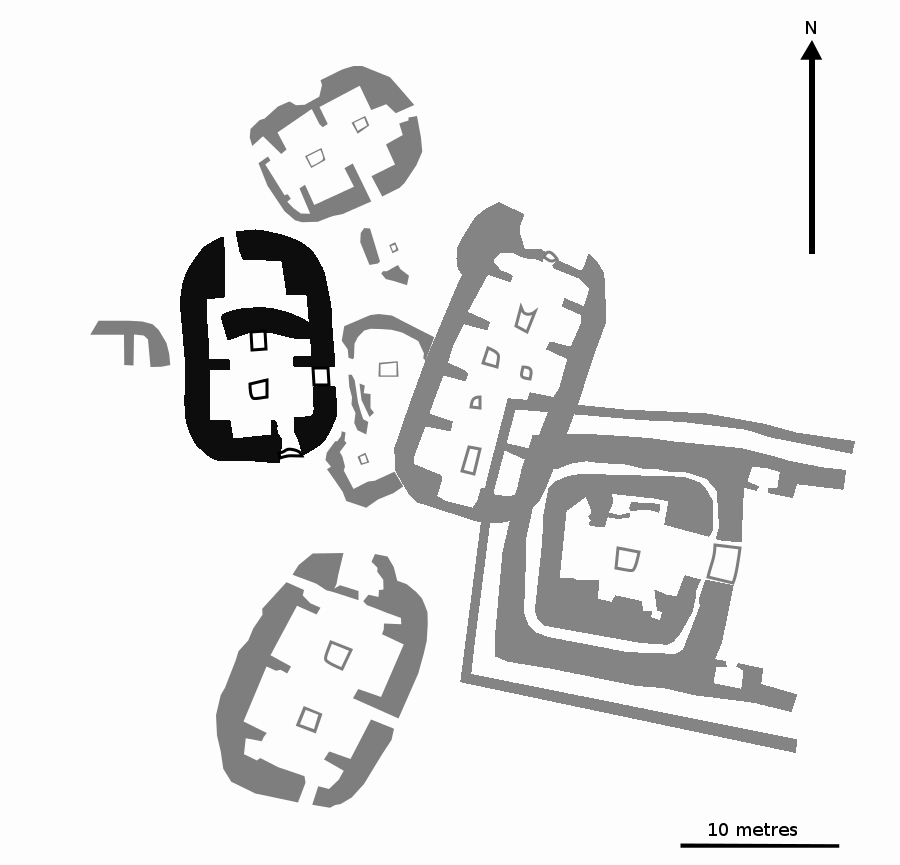
Structure 1

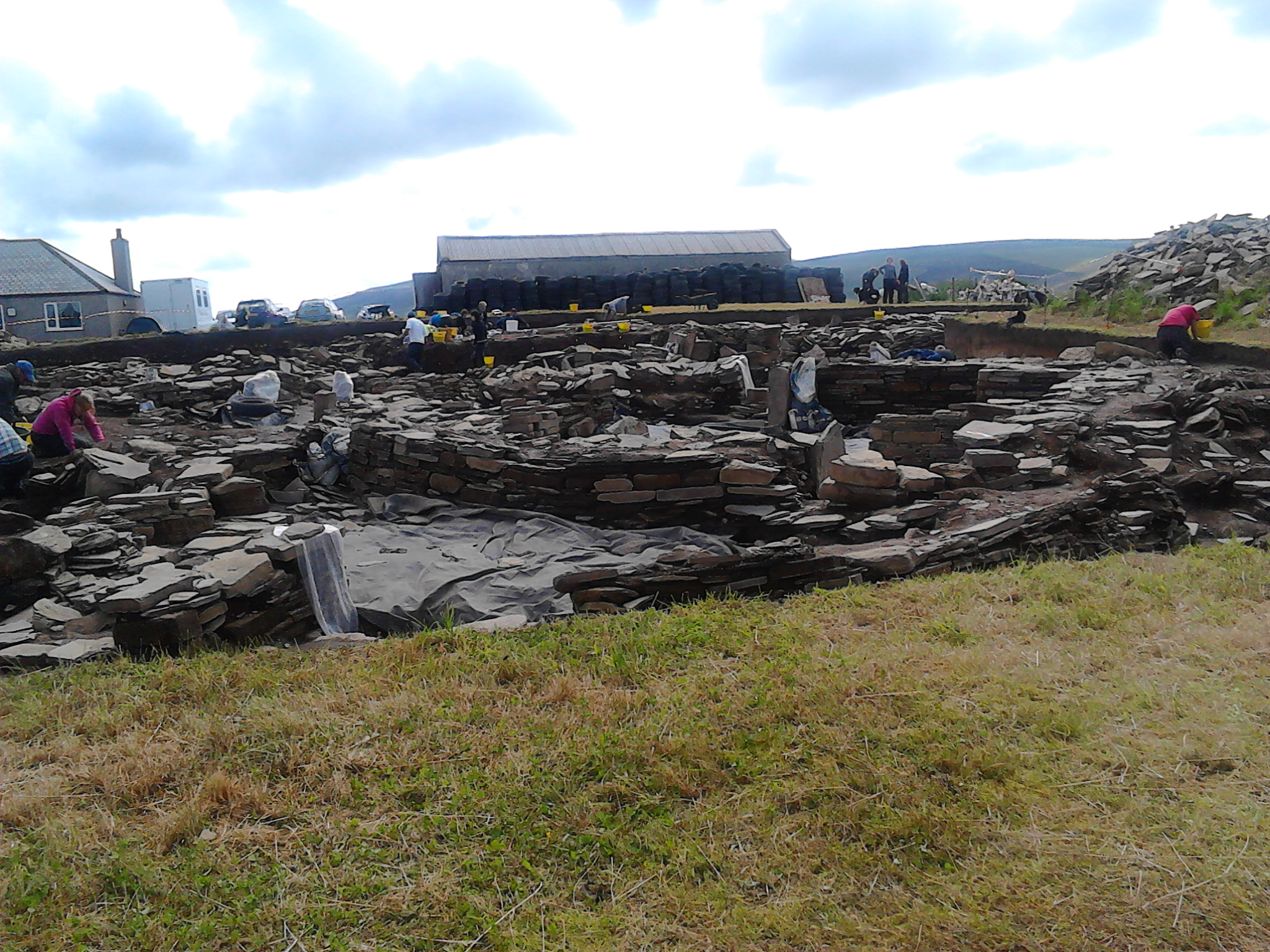
Structure 1 in July 2016

Structure 1 was discovered in 2003, and was the first structure in the Ness of the Brodgar site to be found. What remains of the building are well preserved metre high walls, and feature more than 70 examples of Neolithic art. The structure was rebuilt and remodelled at least three times. It appears to have been built on the remains of an earlier structure, structure 40.

The original form of structure 1 was built around 3100 BC, and measured around 15 metres long and 10 metres wide. It was shaped like a double cross, with a set of piers connected to the side walls and partitioned by orthostats in the floor. The piers divided the building in half. Each side had its own hearth and offset entrance doorways. The south entrance featured decorated stones.

Some of the individual stones of structure 1 were painted yellow, red, and orange using ochre pigment made of haematite mixed with animal fat, milk or eggs. This is the earliest discovery in Britain of evidence that Neolithic people used paint to decorate their buildings.

Structure 1 has a complex history and appears to have been central to the site. Originally it was more than 15 metres (49 ft) long, but was radically rebuilt within about a century of its first construction: two doors were blocked up, a new door was inserted and a new wall built. It was decorated with many pieces of stone artwork, some of which were internal to the walls and would never have been seen while the building was in use.

Around 200 years after its initial creation, structure 1 underwent major reconstruction. Most of the partition slabs were removed, and a curved wall was built across the middle of the northern room, reducing the size of the structure. Three large orthostats were inserted into the curved wall. Both original doorways were sealed, and a new one was made on the eastern wall. Roof tiles discovered beneath the new wall suggest that the roof had caved in or had been collapsed intentionally.

In 2015, the bones of a baby, which died around the time of birth, were unearthed in a recess of this building.

==== Structure 8 ====
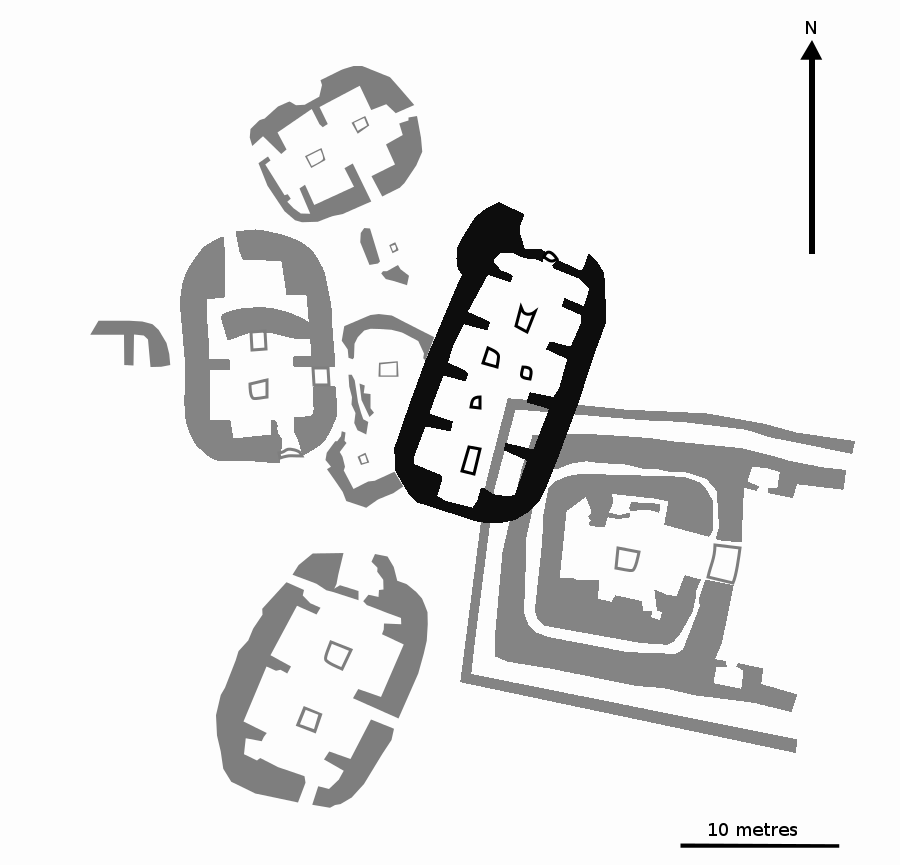
Structure 8

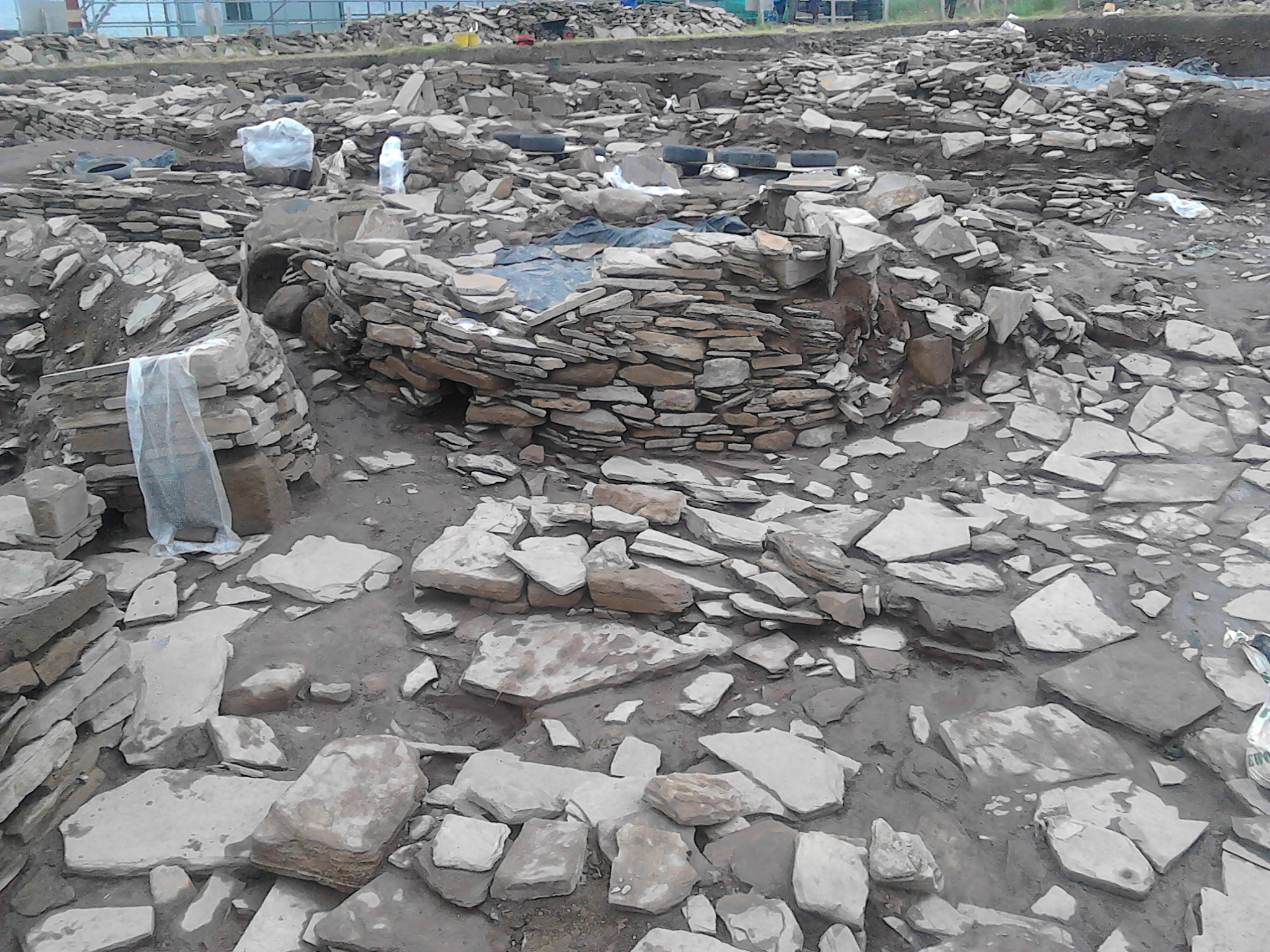
In this image taken in July 2016, structure 8 is visible to the rear. The prominent structure is structure 1.

Structure 8 is a long, somewhat oval shaped structure built on top of structures 17 and 18. The inside of the structure was separated by double piers and contained at least four stone hearths.

Structure 8 was the first building at the Ness where stone roof tiles were discovered, and the first building on site where coloured pigment was found on the walls. Structure 8 was built around 3100 BC, just after structure 1 was completed. This structure was built on unstable foundations. The building was slowly sinking to one side, eventually resulting in a collapse that destroyed the southern half of the building. Even after the partial collapse, the building remained in use. Excavation resulted in the discovery of many items, including animal bones, polished quartz, and stone spatulate tools. None of the spatulate tools show signs of wear and their purpose is unknown. Other finds from this structure included a whalebone mace head and a whale's tooth set in stone.

==== Structure 10 ====
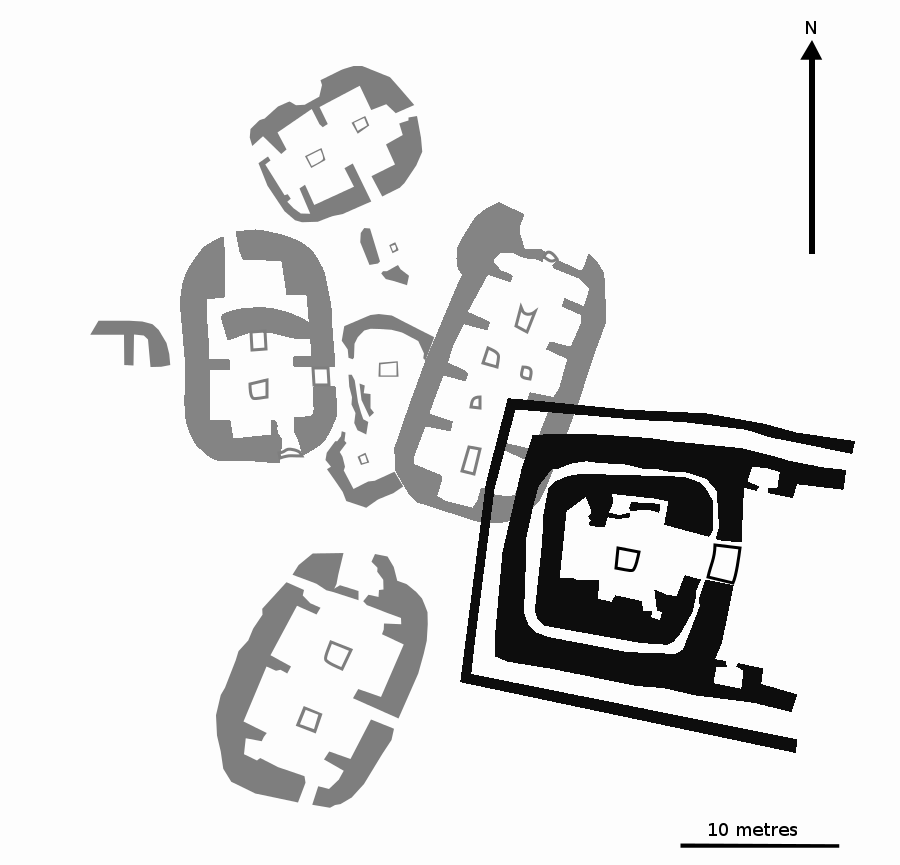
Structure 10

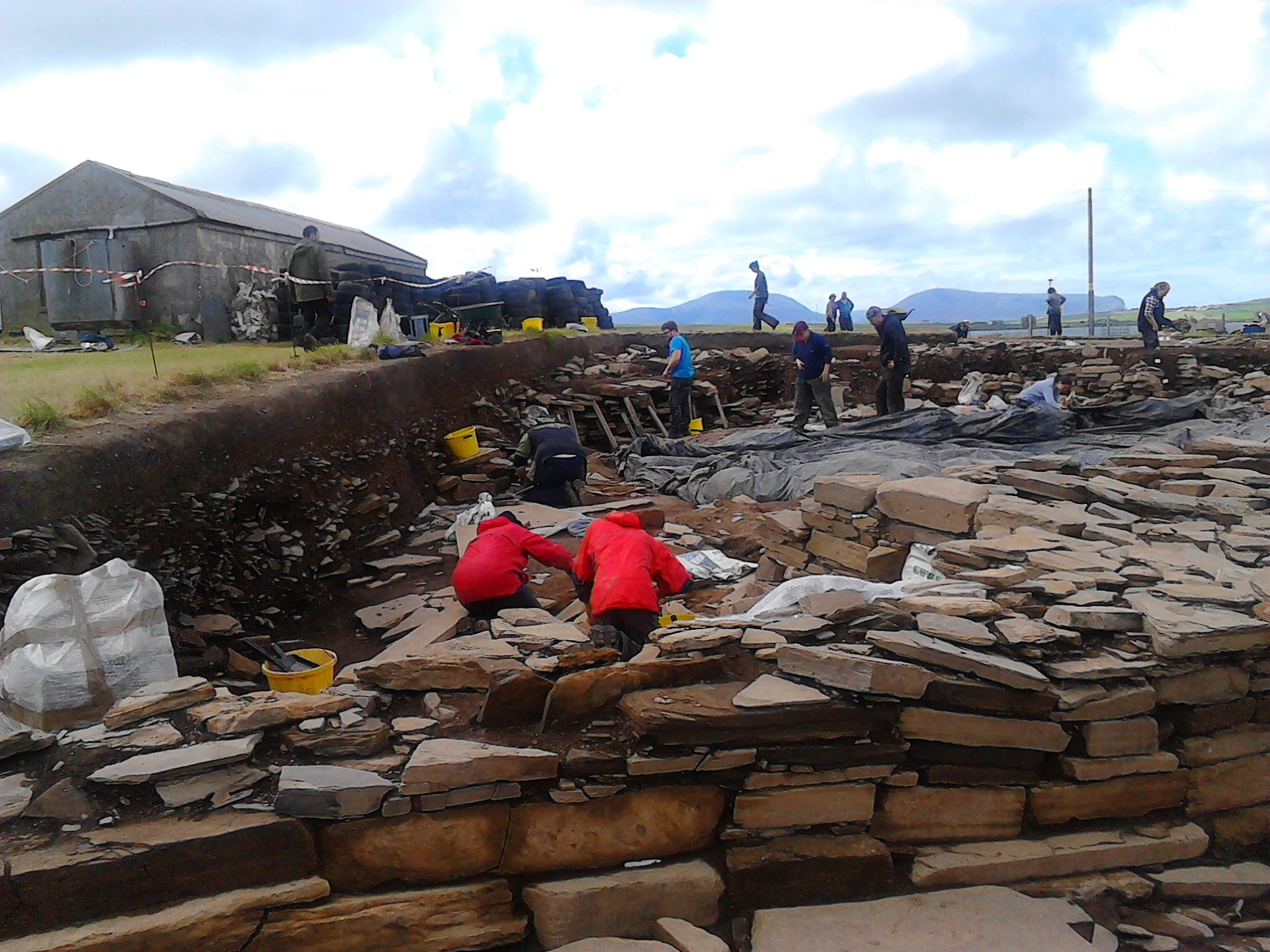
Archaeologists at work on structure 10 in July 2016

Structure 10 was discovered in 2008, and is built on top of the rubble from Structure 8's collapsed wall, as well as the remains of Structure 20 and 33. It is a large square building with an inner, middle, and outer wall. The stone both inside and outside the building is decorated with paint and engravings. It is believed to have been constructed around 2900 BC, and appears to have been partly rebuilt around 2800 BC, probably due to structural instability. This is the largest structure of its kind anywhere in the north of Britain and it would have dominated the ritual landscape of the peninsula.

Structure 10 was used until around 2400–2200 BC, when it appears to have been "closed" in an extraordinary and unique episode of ceremonial demolition involving the slaughter of several hundred cattle. Tibias (shin bones) of approximately 400 cattle comprise the vast majority of bones found. The bones were laid around structure 10 and an upturned cow skull was placed within it. The tibias appear to have been cracked to extract the marrow, suggesting that this slaughter was accompanied by a feast. All the slaughter seems to have taken place in a single event. After the feast, the whole carcasses of several red deer were placed atop the broken bones, and structure 10 was largely destroyed. This event appears to have marked the closure and abandonment of the Ness of Brodgar site.

==== Structure 12 ====
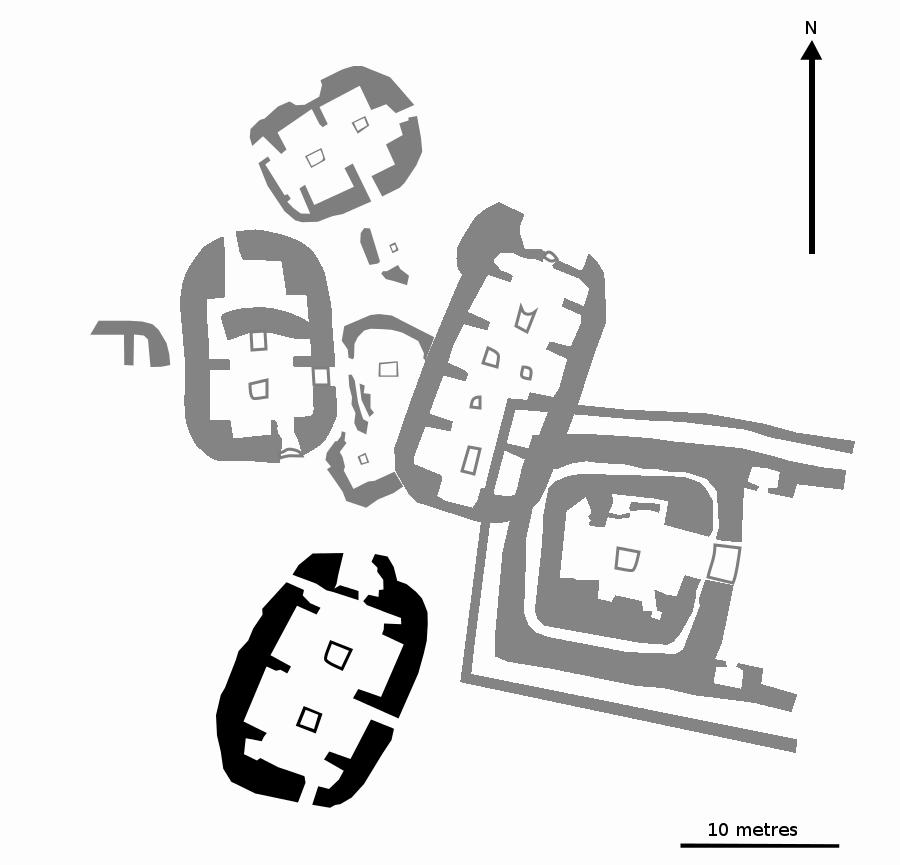
Structure 12

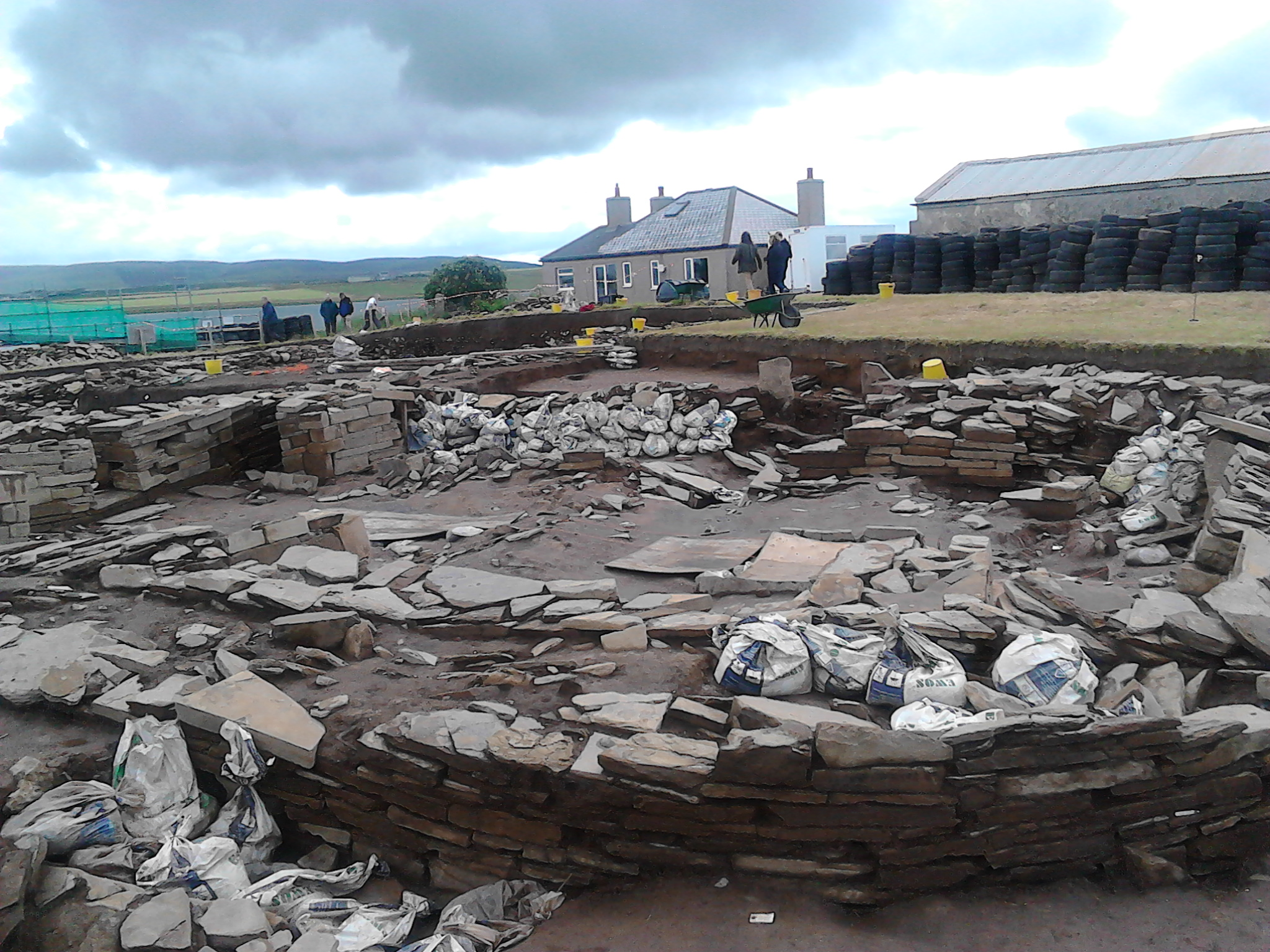
Structure 12 in July 2016. Just visible at the back of this photograph is Neil Oliver.

Structure 12 was built over at least three ovular structures, with estimates for its initial construction dating (radiocarbon) back to around 3100-2900 BC. Split into two sections, the building includes six piers, four recesses and two hearths, one on each side. Because of its precarious position over previous structures, parts of the southern end of the building collapsed. This collapse most likely occurred between 2820-2585 BC based on radiocarbon dates from smashed pots near the southern hearth. Structure 12 was then remodelled several times, including rebuilding the southern wall, filling the original south and northwest entrances, and adding eastern and northern entrances. After these reconstructions, structure 12 was eventually, and likely deliberately, destroyed, and several large decorated stones were artificially fractured.

The new north entrance led to a forecourt which survived the destruction of the main building. Excavation of this forecourt revealed two upright grooved ware pots, pottery shards, hammerstones, and a macehead piece. The red, black, or white pottery at structure 12 was typically decorated by attaching cordons (strips of clay) directly to the main piece, but these often fell off. Another technique was to carve a groove into the piece and press the cordon into it.

The grooved ware styles found at the Ness of Brodgar in structure 12 later spread southwards from Orkney through the repeated motifs of the "eyebrow" and "Brodgar Butterfly," amongst others.

==== Structure 14 ====
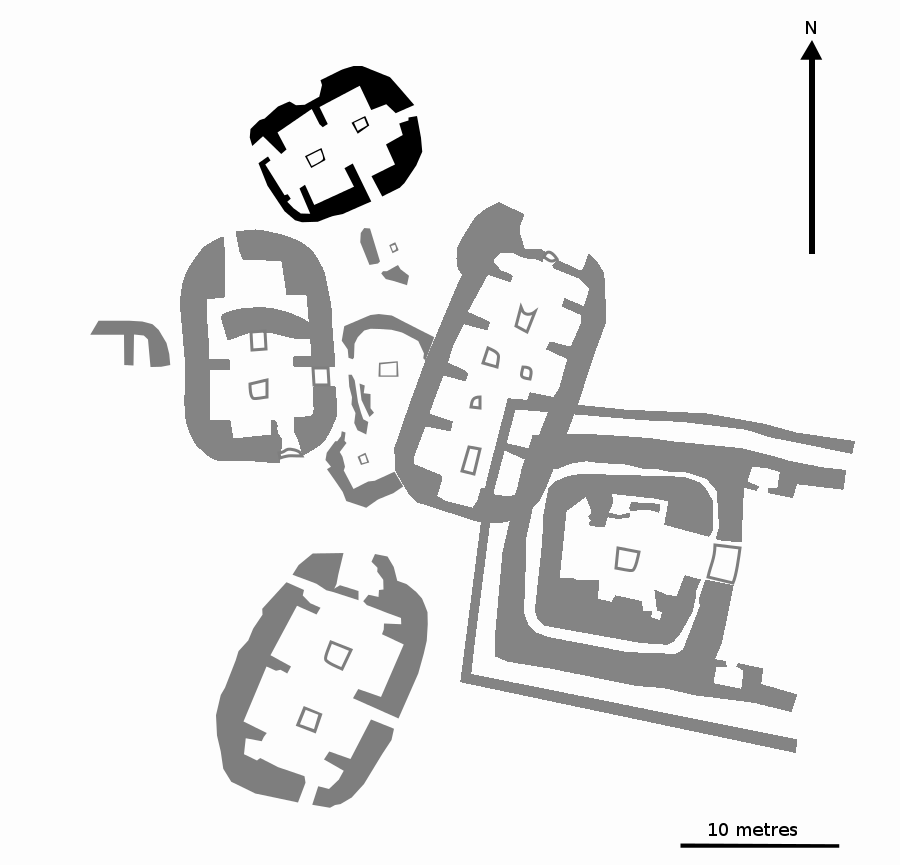
Structure 14

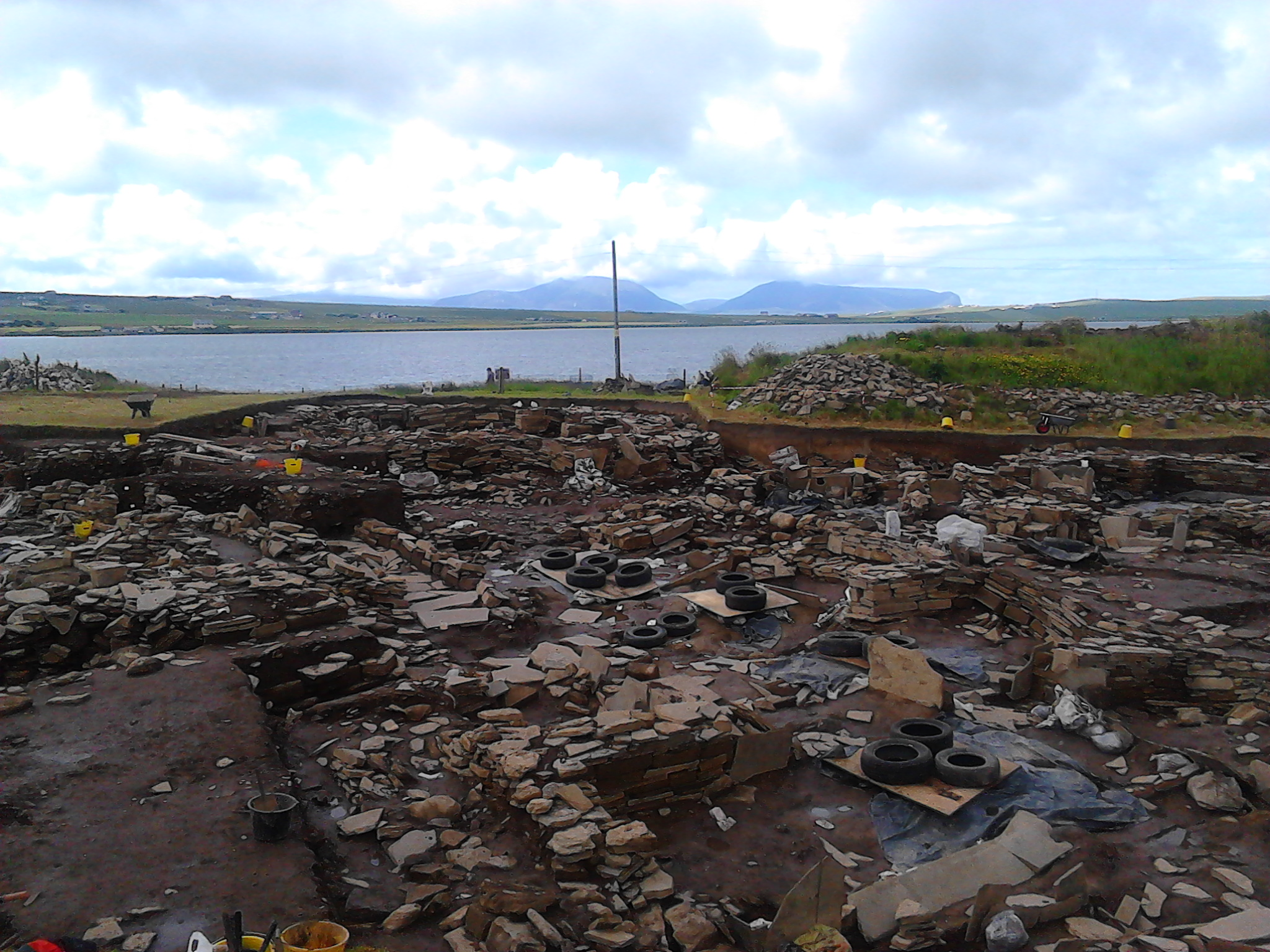
Structure 14 as it appeared in July 2016. The tarpaulins visible in this image are left over from when the site was covered and closed down (dig restarted 4 July). The tyres were used to weigh them down.

Structure 14 was built around 3000 BC, roughly contemporaneously with structures 1, 8 and 12. It is in the northernmost part of Trench P, northeast of and built against one wall of Structure 1. An ovular building with internal measurements of about 8.5 metres (28 ft) metres by 5.75 metres (18.9 ft) metres, structure 14 went through at least two phases of construction. The first phase featured three entrances and several orthostats forming divisions within the building. The second phase included removing some of those orthostat divisions, narrowing the southern entrance, leveling the floor of the northwest side, and adding yellow clay to the floor of the whole structure. Structure 14 had entrances on the northeast end and southeast side, with a cell in the southwest and two hearths centered in each half of the building. The entire structure was eventually dismantled, leaving only the northern foundations and small parts of the southern walls.

A great deal of stone from structure 14 was taken in antiquity for re-use elsewhere, and like all the other structures except structure 10, it appears to have been largely demolished by 2600 BC.

An axehead made of gneiss and a polished igneous stone were found beneath the floor of structure 14, and a carinated bowl shard was found among midden deposits and structural remains dating back to around 3300 BC, before structure 14 was built. A baked clay artefact known as the "Brodgar Boy", and thought to be a figurine with a head, body, and two eyes, was unearthed in the rubble of structure 14 in 2011. It was found in two sections, the smaller of which measures 30 mm.

==== Structure 16 ====
Structure 16 was built sometime between 3000-2900 BC directly south of structure 14. It was about 5 metres (16 ft) by 3 metres (9.8 ft), with an entrance directly across from the entrance of structure 14. Structure 16 had a central hearth and one clay floor deposit, though the eastern side has not been excavated as of 2021. It was likely torn down at the same time as structure 14.

==== Structures 17 and 18 ====
Structures 17 and 18 were both built around 3200 BC, and structure 8 was built on top of them. Both interiors were divided in half by stone piers, and each side had a stone hearth. There were also recesses on each side framed by stone slabs. A paved pathway connects both structures. Structure 17 likely had a stone roof, while structure 18 uniquely included yellow clay in its walls and not just the floor like all the other structures.

==== Structure 26 ====
Structure 26 is a D-shaped building likely built between 2800-2700 BC. It rests between structures 10, 12, and 30, with interior dimensions of 6.5 metres (21 ft) by 4.5 metres (15 ft) metres. It had one entrance in the southeast corner, and a single hearth in the centre. The decorated stone that makes up much of its walls was likely taken from the remains of structures 10 and 12.

==== Structure 28 ====
Structure 28 was built in Trench P around the same time as structures 17 and 18, around 3200 BC, before it was replaced by structure 12 sometime between 3100-2900 BC. The original structure measured around 12 metres (39 ft) by 8.5 metres (28 ft). However, not long after construction, the northern end was shortened by about 2 metres (6.6 ft). The location of any hearths and entrances in structure 28 are unclear. The inner walls of the sub-rectangular building were built of flagstone with pink stripes that came from the West Mainland of Orkney, possibly on the Ness of Brodgar peninsula. This same stone appeared in structure 12 and structure 26. Rubble from structure 28 is visible in some parts of the floor of structure 12, as well as in the lower parts of the walls.

==== Structures 21 and 29 ====
On the side of Trench P and west of structure 1, the eastern part of structure 21's north wall is visible. As of 2021, excavators suspect that structure 21 was similar in size and layout to structure 12. Parts of structure 21 were removed for later use in other buildings. Both structures 21 and 29 date to around 3000-3100 BC depending on the source, along with structures 1, 8, and 12. A small piece of a wall from structure 29 is south of structure 1 and northwest of structure 12.

==== Structure 30 ====
Structure 30 can be found in the corner of Trench P, south-east from structure 12, still mostly buried. Geophysical survey indicates that the structure is rather large and piered. The wall that is exposed is very thin compared to its neighbouring buildings, and is thought to have been built after structure 12.

==== Structures 23 and 33 ====
The remaining evidence of structure 33 is a small curved wall east of structure 28. It was likely similar to structures 14, 17, and 18, and was contemporaneous with structure 28. Structure 23 is only known through a small segment of wall northeast of structure 28. It was built against the northern end of structure 33. Structure 23 was likely similar in size to structure 26. Eventually, much of structure 23 was destroyed to use in the forecourt of structure 12.

==== Structures 20 and 36 ====
Structure 20 was covered by the construction of structure 10 in around 2900 BC, but was originally a sub-rectangular building measuring around 16 metres (52 ft) long. Structure 20 was likely split up by orthostat dividers, and went through some sort of remodelling sometime before it was dismantled for structure 10 to be built. Structure 36 was the original version of structure 14. Structure 14 was built directly on top of the foundations for structure 36, meaning the two were likely the same size and shape.

=== Trench J ===
==== Structure 5 ====
Structure 5 was discovered in 2005 and was the first structure to be excavated. It was built around 3300 BC, and is the largest non-funerary construction found in Orkney from the Early Neolithic period ever found. Excavated in 2008, only some of the building is exposed. The exposed sides of the building measure 16 metres long and can get up to 7.5 metres (25 ft) wide. A geophysical survey of the area suggests that there are 4.5 metres (15 ft) of building buried past the southwestern edge of the trench, making the structure 5 over 20 metres (66 ft) long.

The exposed portion of structure 5 consists of a long, boat-shaped room. A third of the building is still buried, so the building is difficult to measure. Like many others at the site, structure 5 has gone through several periods of reconstruction and modification.

Originally, structure 5 was much smaller, being 7.5 metres (25 ft) wide and more than 14 metres (46 ft) long. It was built on top of the no longer extant structure 41. Its wall cores were made of small stones and boulder clay, unlike other buildings at the site that used debris. The original building had one entrance on the south-eastern wall and a rectangular hearth. The building's walls were lined with stone furnishings like the Skara Brae "dressers".

The original building was later modified, extending the walls to give the building a more rectangular shape. The lack of stone tiles within the structure suggest that it was roofed using other, more easily decomposed materials such as turf. Several post holes were dug post-renovation to insert timber poles to hold up the roof, a sign of hasty structural repairs.

The building was modified for the last time when it was extended on both sides into the boat shape present today. Due to the extension of the northern end of the building, the door was moved to the centre of the eastern side wall. Soon afterwards, building 5 was partially dismantled, indicating a possible collapse which could have led to the decommissioning of the building. The timber posts were carefully removed, suggesting the roof had either been removed or collapsed. Artifacts were then thrown into the post holes and buried.

An inconsistent layering of matter within the building suggests that the floors of the room were kept very clean. From ashy deposits, archaeologists know that the building contained a central hearth.

=== Trench T ===
==== Structure 27 ====
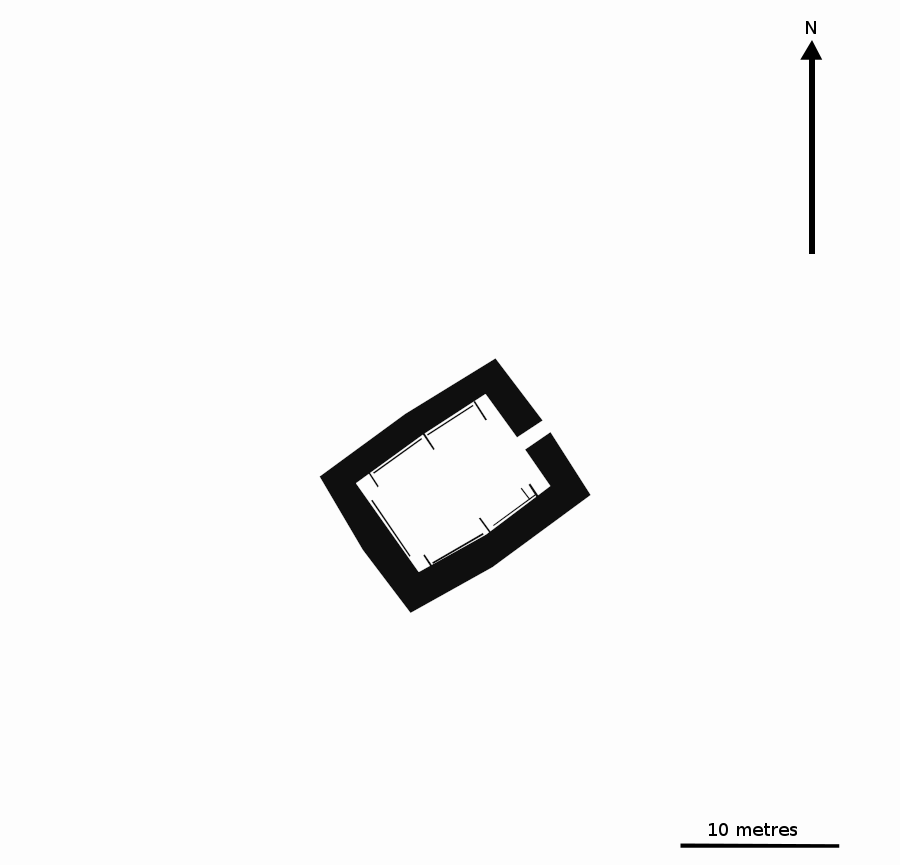
Structure 27

Structure 27 is yet to be firmly dated, but archaeological consensus is that it might have been contemporary with structure 10, in which case it would have been first built around 2900 BC. It stood outside the site's southern boundary wall. It was about 17 metres (56 ft) by 11 metres (36 ft), with an interior measuring about 11 metres (36 ft) by 7.5 metres (25 ft). It had one entrance on the north side, one hearth in the centre, and stone furniture on the interior periphery. A drainage system leading to a drain underneath the southwest wall, surrounds the structure. There may have been a paved path on the outside similar to structure 10. It also had a stone-tiled roof. Fragments of wood and one 60 centimetres (24 in) plank were found preserved in clay, and likely served as supports for the roof. The building was eventually formally decommissioned and dismantled before stone robbers later took parts of the southeastern and southwestern walls.

The structure's walls were deliberately curved, a high quality masonry technique not often seen at the time. Six slabs, approximately 4.5 metres (15 ft) long and 15 centimetres (5.9 in) thick, were incorporated into the structure's interior walls creating another unique structural effect. Other stone slabs with decorations similar to other orthostats on the site formed recesses on both ends of the building. There was one hearth in the centre, but it only had a small layer of ash. Either the hearth was not frequently used, or it was regularly cleaned.

Extensive bone deposits were found around the structure's northwest corner under an orthostat, like those found around structure 10. These bones were mostly cattle, with one otter bone.

=== Hidden Structures ===
Over the original occupation of the Ness of Brodgar, some buildings were demolished and built over. Only the remains of these buildings exist.

==== Structures 11 and 19 ====
Around 2900 BC, structures 11 and 19 were built between structure 1 and structure 8, around the same time that the southern half of structure 8 had been demolished.

Structure 11 sat right next to structure 1 and borrowed a wall from the demolished half of structure 8. Inside, the structure was divided by stone slabs and contained a square hearth opposite the entrance. The floor had been repaired and altered multiple times, somewhat simultaneously with structure 19, supporting the theory that they may have been part of the same building.

Structure 19 was right next to structure 1, only separated by a small paved passageway. Its entrance had two stone pillars, and inside a stone built oven sat in the North-Western corner. The walls were double-skinned, meaning there was a gap of air between the outer and inner layers, which would help with insulation. After structure 19 was demolished, structure 7 was built on top of the remains.

==== Structures 7, 9, 22, and 34 ====
Structures 7, 9, 22, and 34 are scattered around Trench P.

Structure 7 was made from parts of structure 19 after it fell out of use. The small oval building roughly followed the same layout, with a central hearth in the northern half of the building. Archaeologists think the hearth was used for cooking food, and unlike many of the other structures, structure 7 has no evidence of a stone tiled roof.

Structure 9 is still partially buried, with only two wall sections having been excavated. The walls are poorly constructed and curved, and the building contained no hearth or flooring, suggesting a hasty construction.

Structure 22 was built on top of the remains of structure 14, and was partially paved with flagstones. It had one entrance on the northwest side, and, like many of the other structures, was ovular in shape.

Structure 34 is thought to be one of the last constructions in Trench P, and partially overlaps with the remains of structure 8's southern wall. Inside, a three sided box made of stone slabs was discovered, its use still unknown. Other finds in the structure include pottery, animal bone deposits, and a child's milk tooth.

==== Structure 32 ====
At the southern end of Trench J, structure 32 lies on top of the remains of structure 5. It had roughly paved flagstone flooring and a single north-western entrance. It also had a double skinned wall, though the outer wall was not well built. Hearths moved around the building, indicated by 15 separate hearth settings. This hints at periodic short term use of the building.

== Finds ==
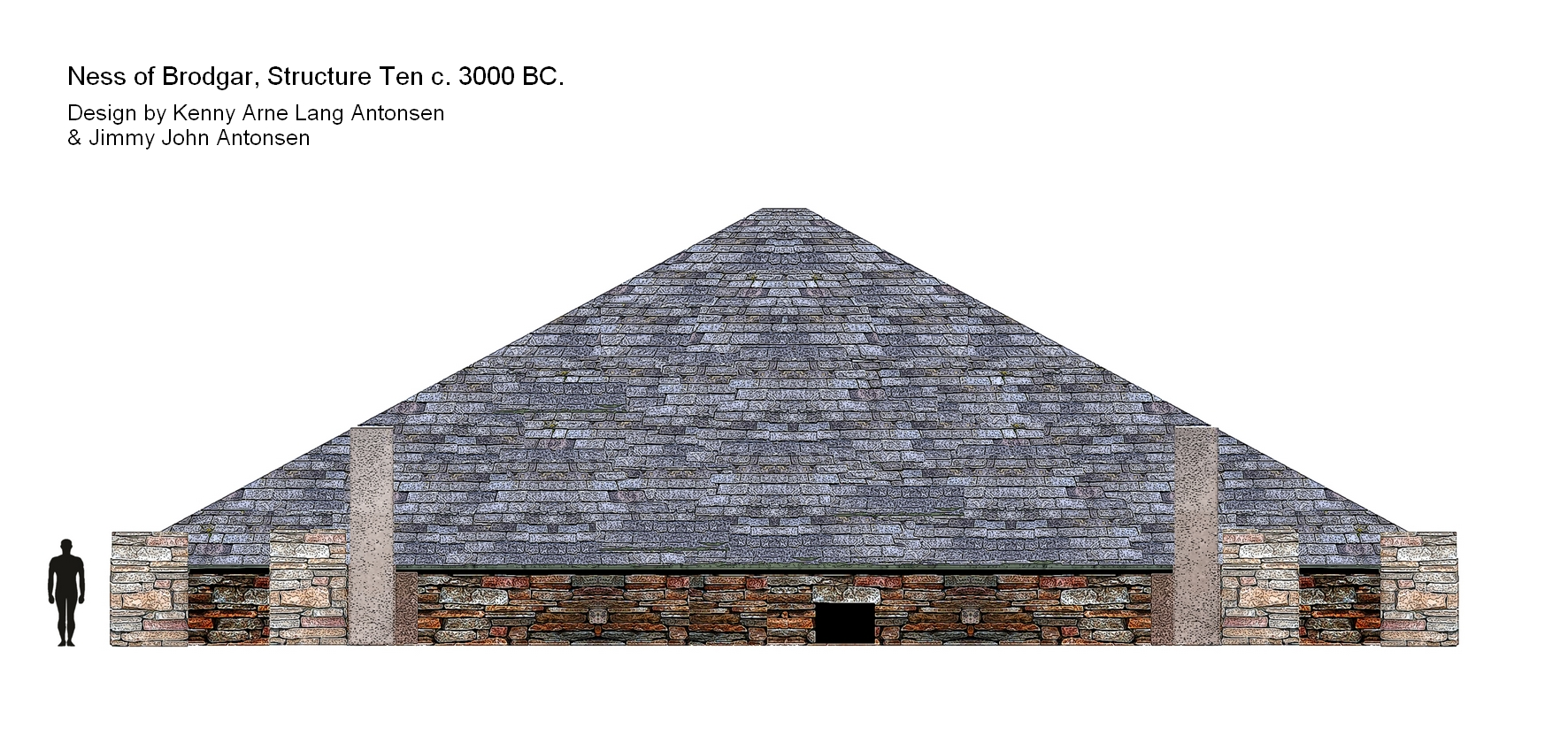
Structure 10, artistic reconstruction c. 3000 BC

Excavations have revealed several buildings, both ritual and domestic, and the works suggest there are likely to be more in the vicinity. Pottery, cremated animal bones, stone tools, and polished stone mace heads have been discovered. All of the main structures have stone slabs with geometric designs carved into them typical of other nearby Neolithic sites like Skara Brae. Structures 1 and 8 also had signs of pigment on some of their stones. The main techniques for stone decoration found at the site are scratching, carving, peeking, pick dressing, and painting. Many of the stones are also cup-marked.

There are the remains of a large stone wall (the "Great Wall of Brodgar") that may have been 100 metres (330 ft) long and 6 metres (20 ft) or more wide. It appears to traverse the peninsula where the site is located, and may have been a symbolic barrier between the ritual landscape of the Ring and the mundane world around it.

In 2013, an intricately inscribed stone was found in structure 10, described as "potentially the finest example of Neolithic art found in the UK for several decades". The stone is inscribed on both sides. A few days later archaeologists discovered a carved stone ball, a very rare find of such an object in situ in "a modern archaeological context".

Later finds include Skaill knives (Note: A Skaill knife is a flaked stone with a sharp edge used for cutting. This neolithic tool is named after Bay of Skaill find site, the location of the World Heritage Site Skara Brae on Orkney.) and hammer stones, and another, perhaps even bigger wall. The dig involves archaeologists from Orkney College and from the universities of Aberdeen, Cardiff, and Glasgow.

Six Neolithic carved stone balls made of camptonite with an average diameter of 65.58 millimetres and an average knob diameter of 36.46 millimetres were found at the site. They are currently held in The Orkney Museum.

== World Heritage status ==
The Heart of Neolithic Orkney was inscribed as a World Heritage site in December 1999. While the Ness of Brodgar is not explicitly named in the 1999 inscription, it is included in both the original and modified (2015) buffer zones surrounding the Heart of Neolithic Orkney site because of its position directly between the Ring of Brodgar and the Stones of Stenness. UNESCO World Heritage buffer zones come with legal regulations intended to protect both the listed sites themselves and their surroundings, which contribute environmental context to the greater archaeological and cultural understanding of the site.

Like all World Heritage sites in Scotland, The Heart of Neolithic Orkney is managed by Historic Environment Scotland, previously Historic Scotland. Historic Environment Scotland aims to maintain sites like The Heart of Neolithic Orkney to spread awareness of the early customs and achievements of people in what is now Scotland.

As of 2016, the Ness of Brodgar was one of the most visited sites in Orkney.

== Excavation ==
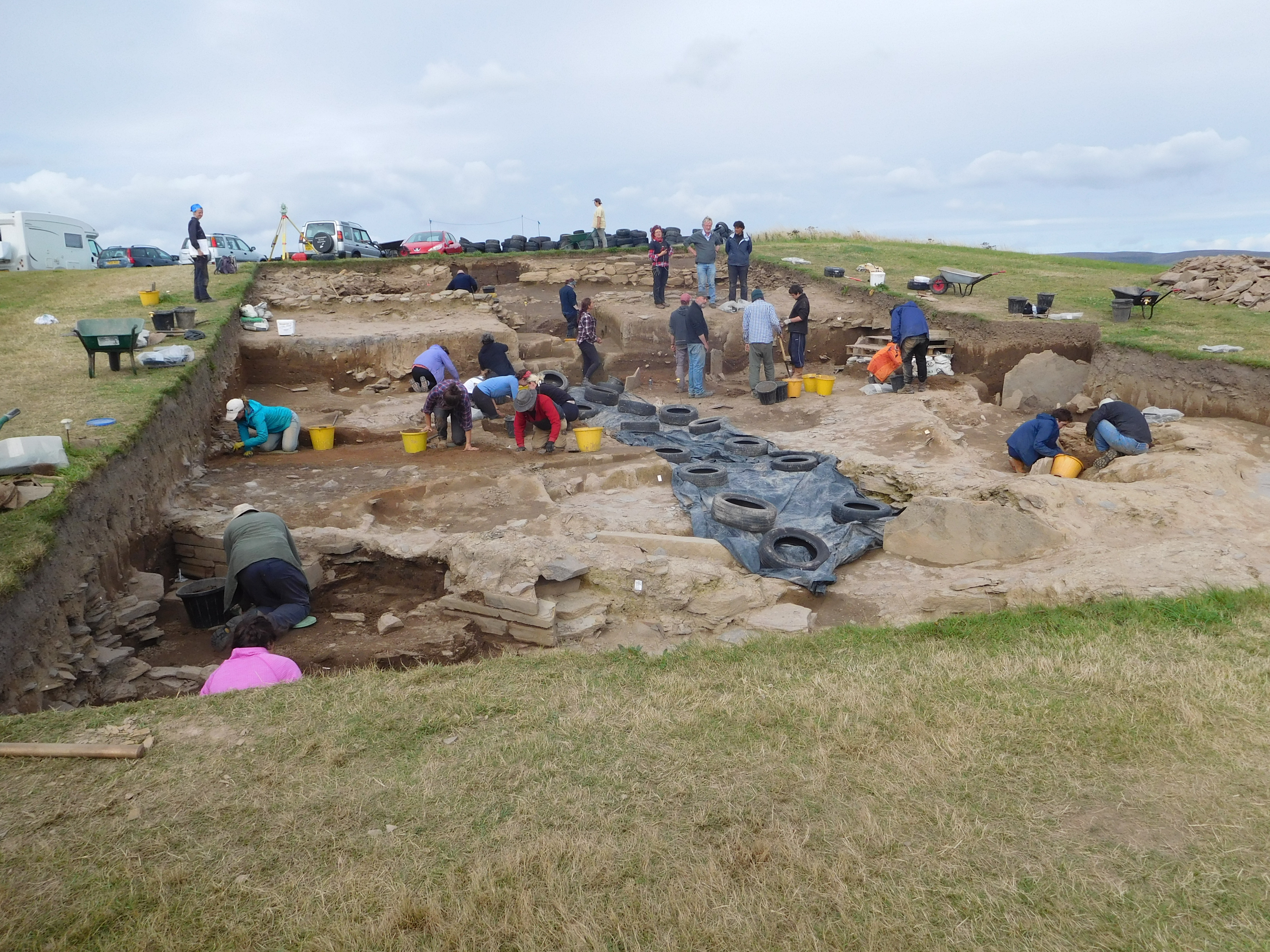
Dig at the Ness of Brodgar in August 2018

A 2002 geophysical survey of the area as part of the Heart of Neolithic Orkney Geophysics Programme unexpectedly showed anomalies on the peninsula. In 2003 a large notched slab discovered during ploughing was examined. Investigation of the findspot uncovered a Neolithic building similar to Structure 2 and roughly 15 metres by 20 metres with two internal recesses. About 0.3 metres of the double-faced stone walls remained. Archaeological excavations were begun at the site by a team from the Orkney Research Centre for Archaeology of the UHI Archaeology Institute led by Nick Card. Trial trenching was conducted between 2004 and 2008 to investigate the mound and the threat from ploughing. Trenches A through J were opened. The mound was determined to be about 250 metres by 100 metres (NW–SE) and over 4 metres high.

From 2009 until 2024, the site was excavated during the summer period. For the remainder of the year, it was covered in polyethylene plastic and tyres to protect it from the environment. It was announced in March 2023 that the site would be buried and returfed in August 2024, to preserve the site for future archaeologists, as some of the quarried stonework had begun to laminate and crumble on exposure to the air. Reburial began on 16 August 2024, and was "all but completed" as of 27 September 2024.

Prompted by new ground penetrating radar imagery a new four-week excavation will be conducted in July 2026. The dig will be open to visitors, on weekdays, between Tuesday 7 July and Thursday 30 July 2026.

== See also ==
- Westray Wife – another Neolithic figurine discovered in Orkney.
- Skara Brae – a stone-built Neolithic settlement, located on the Bay of Skaill.
- UHI Archaeology Institute

== Bibliography ==
- Wickham-Jones, Caroline (2015). Between the Wind and the Water (2nd ed.). Oxford, UK: Windgather Press. ISBN 978-1-909686-50-2.
- Towers, Roy; Card, Nick; Edmonds, Mark (2015). The Ness of Brodgar. Archaeology Institute. Kirkwall, UK: University of the Highlands and Islands. ISBN 978-0-9932757-0-8.
