= UHI Archaeology Institute =

Research and teaching institute in Orkney, Scotland

- Established: 2014
- Parent institution: University of the Highlands and Islands
- Director: Jane Downes
- Academic staff: 17
- Location: Orkney College UHI, East Road, Kirkwall, UK; 58.9865°N 2.9470°W
- Website: archaeologyorkney.com

UHI Archaeology Institute is an academic department of the University of the Highlands and Islands in Scotland. It was founded in 2014, incorporating Orkney College's archaeology department and the Orkney Research Centre for Archaeology. The director is Professor Jane Downes. The institute offers both undergraduate and postgraduate teaching. The Orkney Research Centre for Archaeology (ORCA) is the institute's commercial archaeology branch and is registered with the Chartered Institute for Archaeologists.

== History ==
The institute was founded in 2014, expanding on the archaeology department hosted by Orkney College, part of the University of the Highlands and Islands. The Institute received funding from The Robertson Trust, Orkney Islands Council, and Highlands and Islands Enterprise. The UHI started running undergraduates programmes in archaeology in 2011.

The institute was created to carry out teaching and research, with a branch providing commercial archaeology services, the Orkney Research Centre for Archaeology (ORCA) which was founded in 2007 and is registered with the Chartered Institute for Archaeologists.

== Impact ==
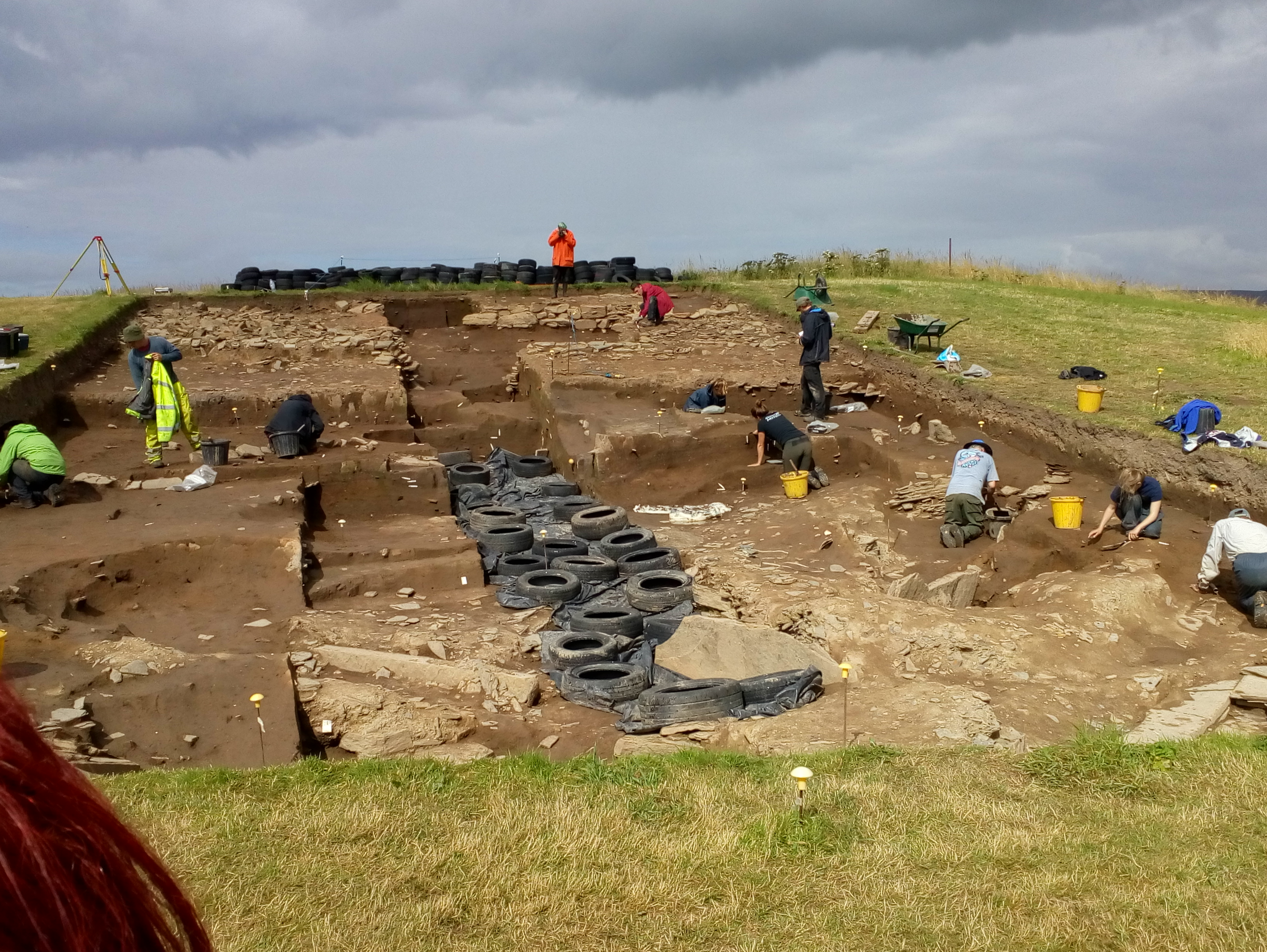
Excavations at the Ness of Brodgar in 2017

Tourism is a key component of Orkney's economy, with 700,000 visiting the Heart of Neolithic Orkney World Heritage Site between 2014 and 2020. Tourism to contributed £50 million to Orkney's economy in 2017. Excavations at the Ness of Brodgar and investigations across the World Heritage Site led by UHI Archaeology Institute led to news coverage and increased tourism to Orkney.

== Teaching ==
In the 2021 Postgraduate Taught Experience Survey, the institute's Masters courses on Contemporary Art and Archaeology, Archaeological Practice, and Archaeological Studies received satisfaction ratings of 100%, 86%, and 70% respectively; the university overall scored 87% in the survey.
