= Ring of Brodgar =

Neolithic stone circle in Orkney, Scotland

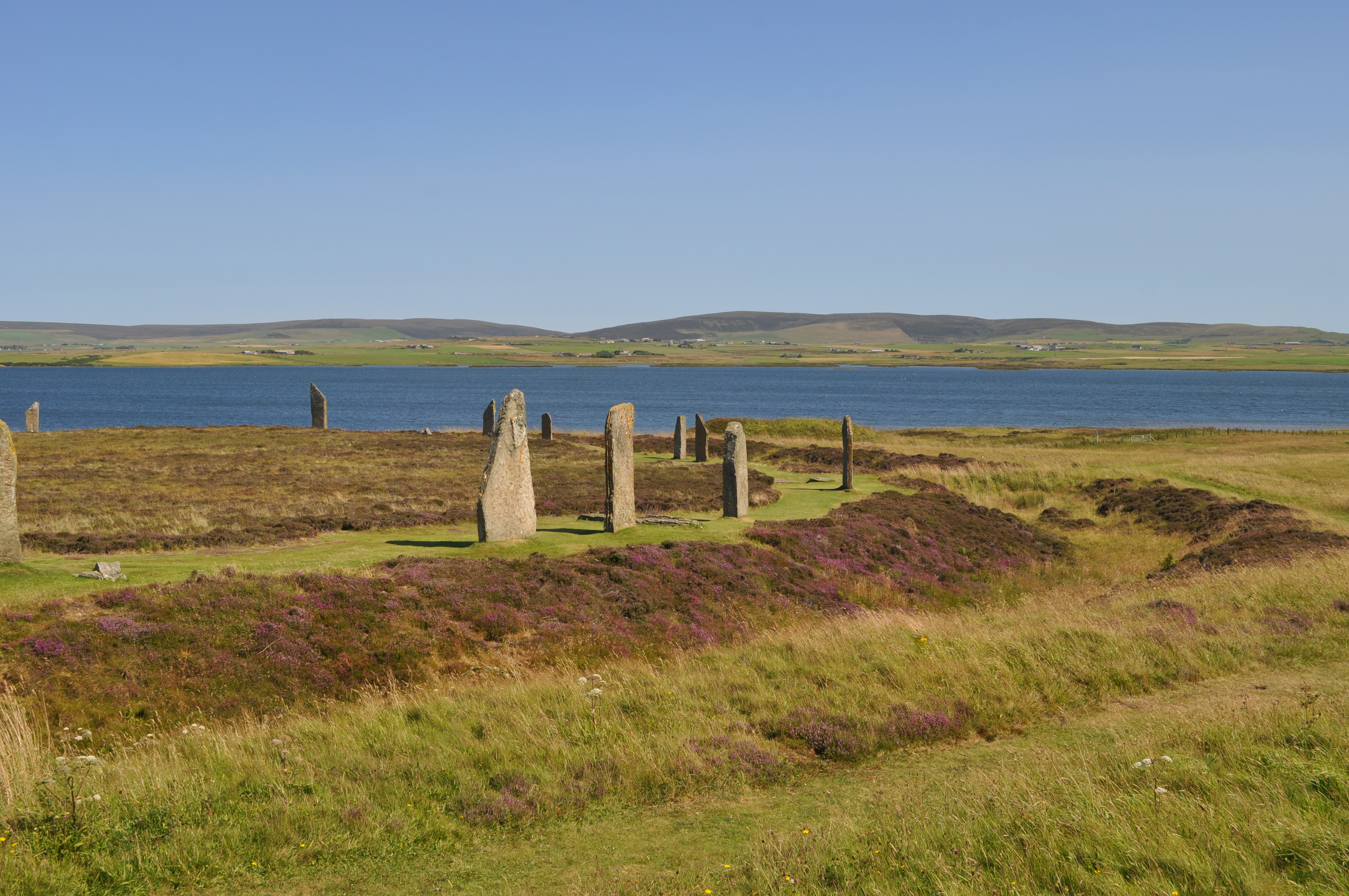
- The ring with Loch of Harray beyond

- Location in Scotland, United Kingdom
- 59°00′05″N 3°13′47″W
- Type: Standing stones, henge
- Periods: Neolithic
- Location: Mainland, Orkney, Scotland, United Kingdom

History
- Built: c. 2250 BC

Site notes
- Material: Stone
- Diameter: 104 m (341 ft)
- Owner: Historic Environment Scotland
- Public access: Yes

UNESCO World Heritage Site
- Type: Cultural
- Criteria: i, ii, iii, iv
- Designated: 1999 (23rd session)
- Part of: Heart of Neolithic Orkney
- Reference no.: 514
- Region: Western Europe

Scheduled monument
- Official name: Ring of Brogar stone circle
- Type: Prehistoric ritual and funerary: barrow; cairn (type uncertain); henge; stone circle or ring; stone setting
- Designated: 18 August 1882
- Reference no.: SM90042

The Ring of Brodgar (or Brogar, or Ring o' Brodgar) is a Neolithic henge and stone circle about 6 miles north-east of Stromness on Mainland, the largest island in Orkney, Scotland. It is part of the UNESCO World Heritage Site known as the Heart of Neolithic Orkney.

== Location and landscape ==
The Ring of Brodgar stands on a narrow isthmus on the island of Mainland in Orkney, Scotland, about 10 kilometres (6.2 mi) north-east of the town of Stromness. The monument occupies a prominent position between two large freshwater lochs: the Loch of Stenness to the south and the Loch of Harray to the north. This narrow strip of land forms a natural corridor through the central Orkney landscape and places the stone circle in a visually striking and geographically distinctive setting.

The monument lies within one of the densest concentrations of Neolithic archaeology in Britain. Nearby are several major prehistoric sites, including the Standing Stones of Stenness to the south-east, the chambered tomb of Maeshowe to the east, and the large ceremonial and settlement complex at the Ness of Brodgar between the two lochs. Together these monuments form part of the wider ceremonial landscape now recognised as the Heart of Neolithic Orkney UNESCO World Heritage Site.

Within an area of roughly 5 square kilometres (1.9 mi^{2}) surrounding the ring are numerous prehistoric monuments including other stone circles, chambered tombs, standing stones, burial mounds, cairns, and earthworks. This unusually dense concentration of sites indicates that the central part of Mainland, Orkney functioned as a major ceremonial centre during the Neolithic period.

The circle stands on gently rising ground with wide views across the surrounding lochs and farmland. The open terrain allows the stones to be seen clearly against the skyline, and the monument maintains visual relationships with several nearby prehistoric sites across the central Orkney landscape. Its position roughly midway between monuments such as Stenness and Maeshowe suggests that the location was deliberately chosen within a broader ceremonial complex.

Although the precise reasons for selecting this location remain uncertain, the monument's placement between two lochs and among several important Neolithic sites suggests that natural features such as water, visibility, and movement through the landscape played an important role in the siting of the ring.

== General information ==
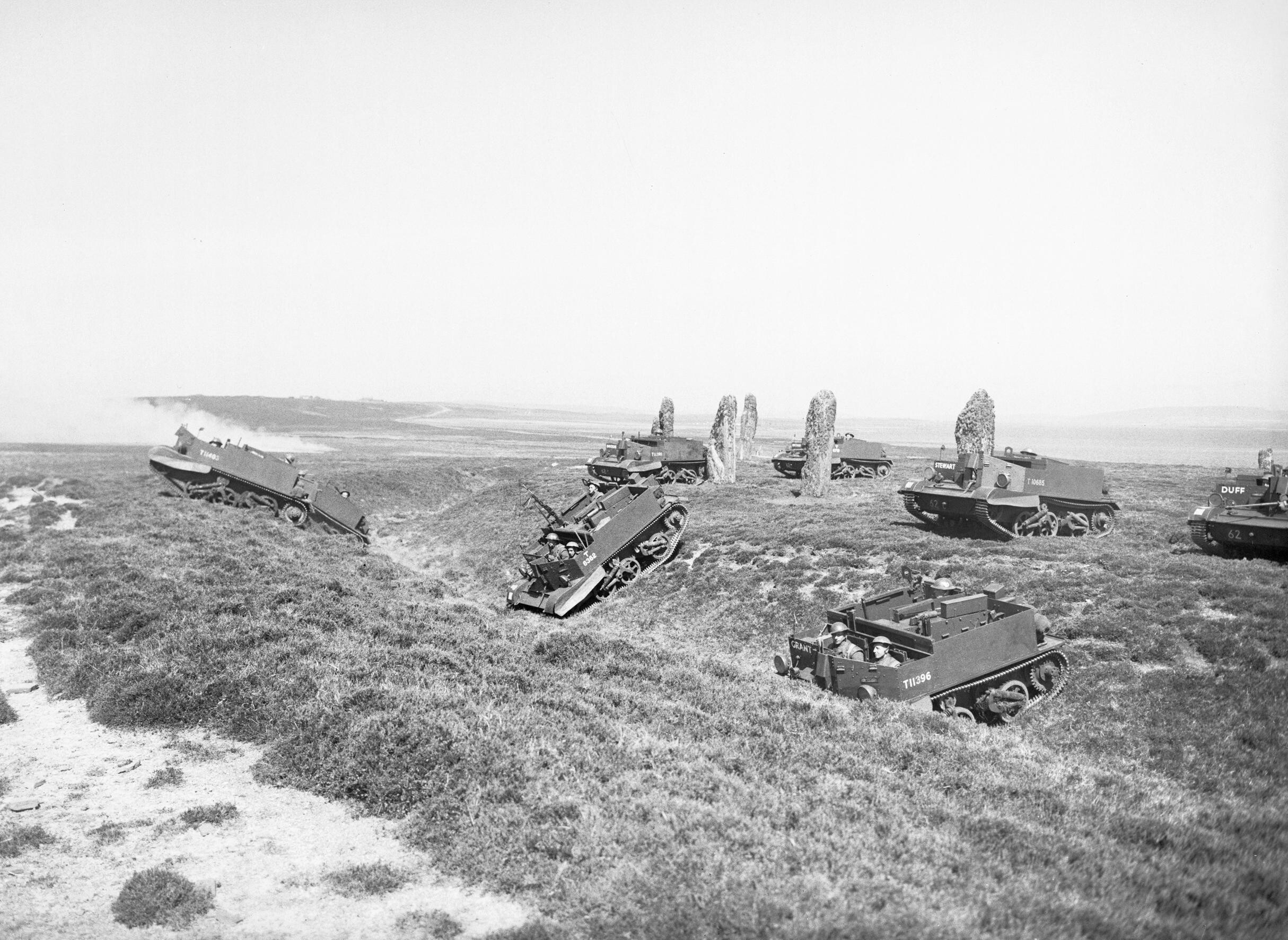
Bren gun carriers of the 9th Battalion, Gordon Highlanders pass between the prehistoric standing stones 18 June 1941

The Ring of Brodgar (or Brogar, or Ring o' Brodgar) is a Neolithic henge and stone circle in Mainland, Orkney, Scotland. It is the only major henge and stone circle in Britain which is an almost perfect circle. Most henges do not contain stone circles; Brodgar is a striking exception, ranking with Avebury and Stonehenge among the greatest of such sites. The ring of stones stands on a small isthmus between the Lochs of Stenness and Harray. These are the northernmost examples of circle henges in Britain. Unlike similar structures such as Avebury, there are no obvious stones inside the circle, but since the interior of the circle has never been excavated by archaeologists, the possibility remains that wooden structures, for example, may have been present.

The site has resisted attempts at scientific dating and the monument's age remains uncertain. It is generally thought to have been erected between 2500 BCE and 2000 BCE, and was, therefore, the last of the great Neolithic monuments built on the Ness. A project called The Ring of Brodgar Excavation 2008 was undertaken in the summer of that year in an attempt to settle the age issue and help answer other questions about a site that remains relatively poorly understood. The results of the excavation are still preliminary.

The stone circle is 104 metres (341 ft) in diameter, and the third largest in the British Isles. The ring originally had up to 60 stones, of which only 27 remained standing at the end of the 20th century. The tallest stones stand at the south and west of the ring, including the "Comet Stone" to the south-east. The stones are set within a circular ditch up to 3 metres (9.8 ft) deep, 9 metres (30 ft) wide and 380 metres (1,250 ft) in circumference that was carved out of the solid sandstone bedrock by the ancient residents. Technically, this ditch does not constitute a true henge as there is no sign of an encircling bank of earth and rock. Many archaeologists continue to refer to this structure as a henge; for example, Aubrey Burl classifies the ditch as a Class II henge; one that has two opposing entrances, in this case on the north-west and south-east.

The ditch appears to have been created in sections, possibly by workforces from different parts of Orkney. The stones may have been a later addition, maybe erected over a long period of time.

Examination of the immediate environs reveals a concentration of ancient sites, making a significant ritual landscape. Within 2 square miles (5.2 km^{2}) there are the two circle-henges, four chambered tombs, groups of standing stones, single stones, barrows, cairns, and mounds. The immediate area has also yielded a number of flint arrowheads and broken stone mace-heads that seem to date from the Bronze Age. Although its exact purpose is not known, the proximity to the Ness of Brodgar site and the Standing Stones of Stenness and its Maeshowe tomb beyond make the Ring of Brodgar a site of major importance.

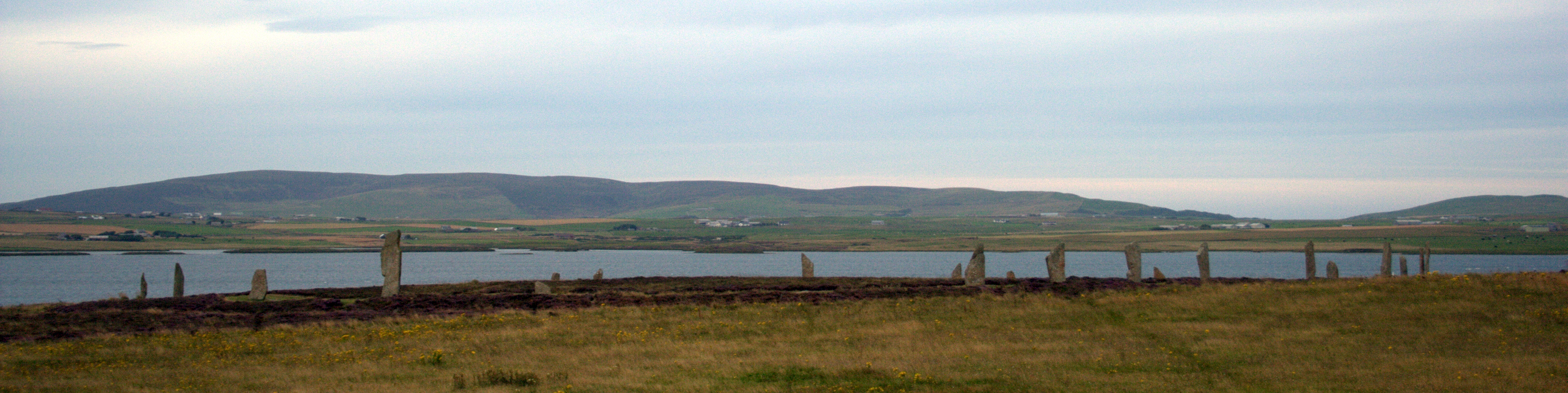
The Ring of Brodgar

The first formal survey of the Ring of Brodgar and surrounding antiquities was performed in 1849 by Royal Navy Captain Frederick Thomas of HM cutter Woodlark. Captain Thomas was in the area drawing up Admiralty Charts from 1848–1849, and he and his crew performed archaeological surveys as well resulting in the publication in 1852 of The Celtic Antiquities of Orkney.

=== Excavations of Neolithic ruins ===
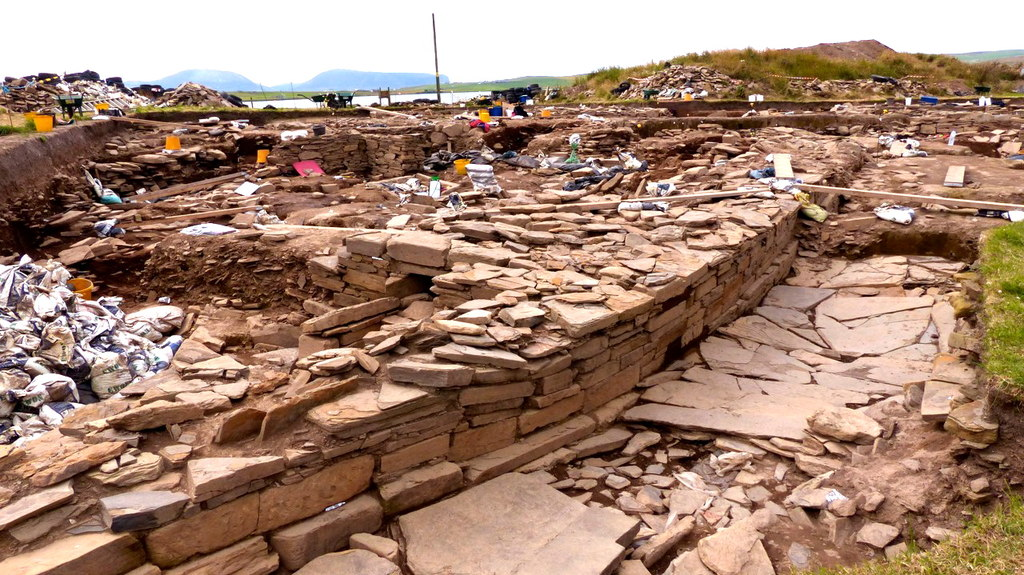
Neolithic settlement at Brodgar, (August 2014)

Ongoing excavations by Orkney College at the nearby Ness of Brodgar site located roughly midway between the Ring and the Stones of Stenness have uncovered several buildings, both ritual and domestic. Geophysics suggest there are likely to be more in the vicinity. Pottery, bones, stone tools and a polished stone mace head have also been discovered. Perhaps the most important find is the remains of a large stone wall which may have been 100 metres (330 ft) long and up to 6 metres (20 ft) wide. It appears to traverse the entire peninsula the site is on and may have been a symbolic barrier between the ritual landscape of the Ring and the mundane world around it.

== Nordic rites ==
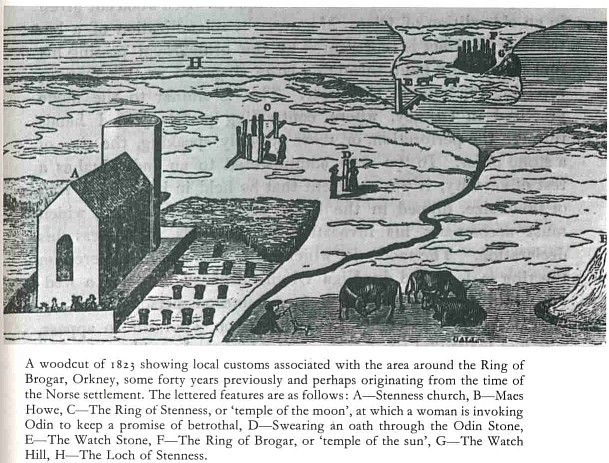
1823 woodcut, the Ring of Brodgar & surroundings

Invaders from Scandinavia reached Orkney by the 9th century, bringing a complex theology that they imposed on the preexisting Orcadian monuments; at least according to local legend. For example, the Ring of Brodgar and the Standing Stones of Stenness were allegedly known as the Temple of the Sun and Moon respectively. Young people supposedly made their vows and prayed to Wōden at these "temples" and at the so-called "Odin Stone" that lay between the stone circles until it was destroyed by a farmer in 1814. Others view these fanciful names with skepticism; Sigurd Towrie suggests that "they were simply erroneous terms applied by the antiquarians of the 18th or 19th centuries – romantic additions, in the same vein as the infamous "Druid's Circle" and "Sacrificial Altar"." At the very least, several of the stones at Brodgar contain runic carvings that were left by Nordic peoples. These include the name "Bjorn" and a small cross as well as an anvil.

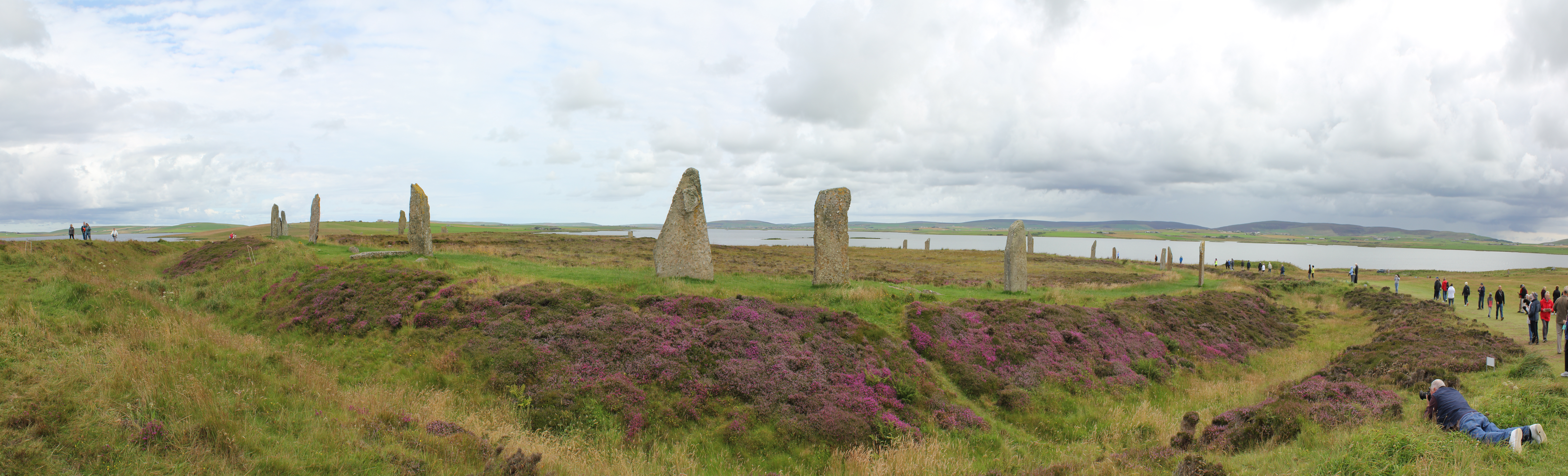
Ring of Brodgar, Orkney Standing Stones 02

== "Megalithic Yard" and Neolithic astronomers at Brodgar ==
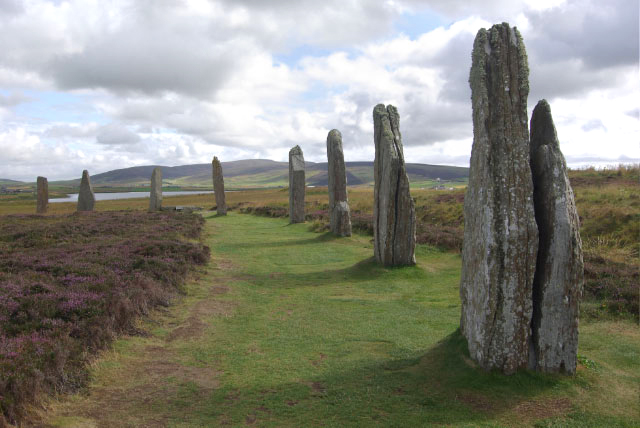
The Ring of Brodgar

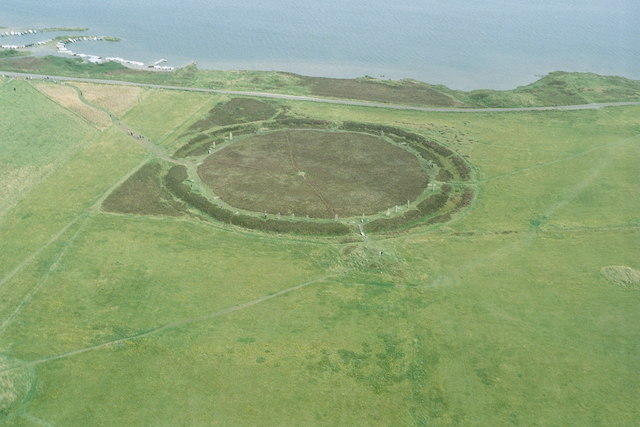
The Ring of Brodgar seen from above

Burl notes that the diameter of the bank at Brodgar is almost exactly the same as the inner banks of the Avebury monument in England and the Newgrange ring in Ireland: 125 "megalithic yards" (MY), at 0.8297 metres (2.722 ft) per MY. This is a controversial unit originally proposed by Alexander Thom. Thom's thesis, based on a statistical analysis of Neolithic monuments in the United Kingdom, is that the builders of these sites employed a common unit of measurement, although it has not been demonstrated how this information could have been shared.

Heggie casts doubt on this as well, stating that his careful analysis uncovered "little evidence for a highly accurate unit" and "little justification for the claim that a highly accurate unit was in use". Thom and his father made other controversial contentions, for example, that Brodgar and the burial mounds that surround it were designed specifically as backsights for astronomical observations of the Moon. Graham Ritchie points out that the burial mounds have not been reliably dated, and he casts doubt on the astronomical prowess of the builders.

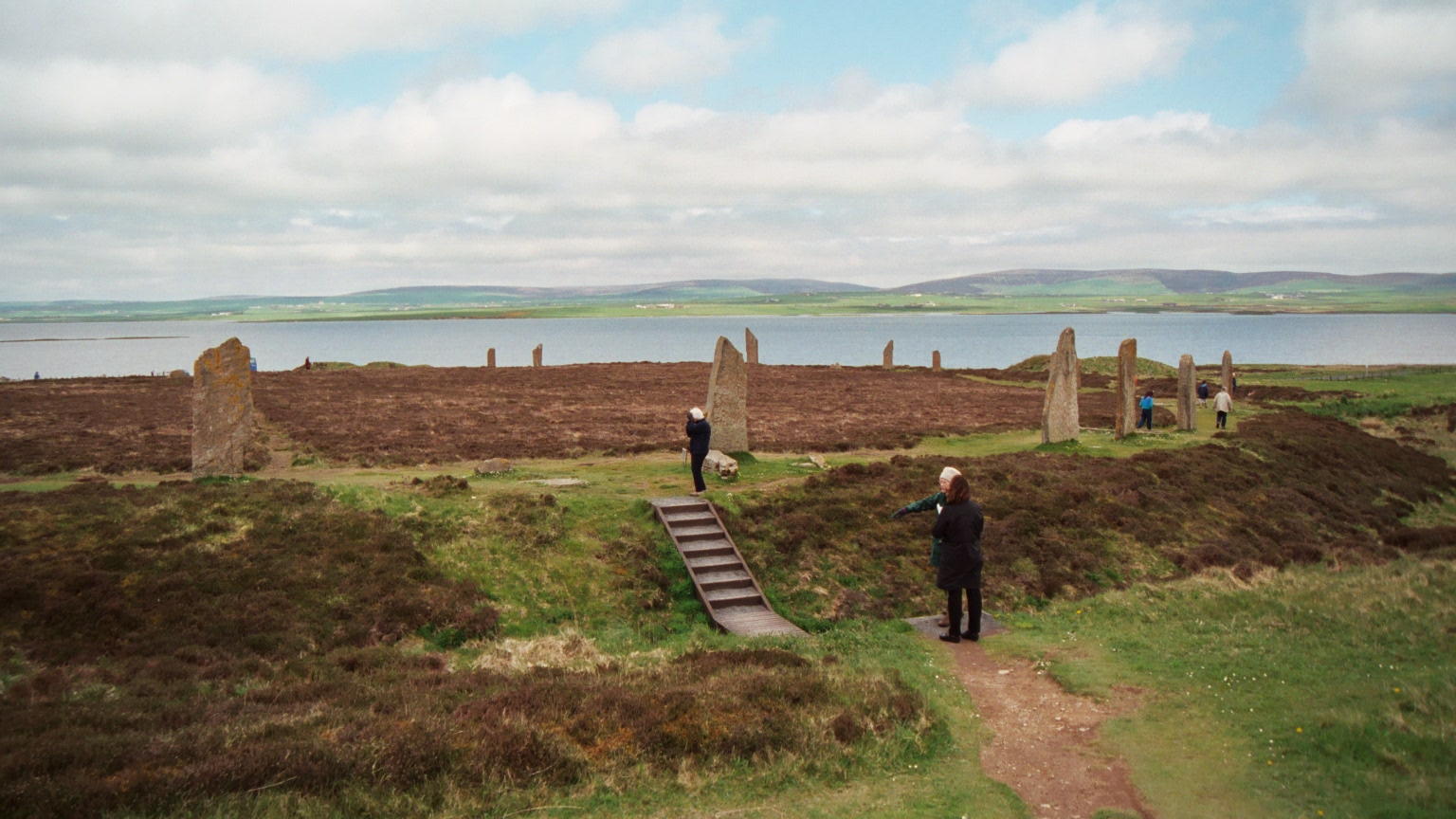
Ring of Brodgar

Euan MacKie suggested that the nearby village of Skara Brae might be the home of a privileged theocratic class of wise men who engaged in astronomical and magical ceremonies at sites like Brodgar and Stenness. Graham and Anna Ritchie cast doubt on this interpretation noting that there is no archaeological evidence for the claim, although a Neolithic "low road" connects Skara Brae with the chambered tomb of Maeshowe, passing near Brodgar and Stenness. Low roads connect Neolithic ceremonial sites throughout Britain.

== Conservation and access ==
The site is a scheduled monument and was included in the "Heart of Neolithic Orkney" World Heritage Site in 1999.

=== World Heritage status ===
The Heart of Neolithic Orkney includes, in addition to the Ring of Brodgar, Maeshowe, Skara Brae, the Standing Stones of Stenness and other nearby sites. It is managed by Historic Environment Scotland, whose 'Statement of Significance' for the site begins:

The monuments at the heart of Neolithic Orkney and Skara Brae proclaim the triumphs of the human spirit in early ages and isolated places. They were approximately contemporary with the mastabas of the archaic period of Egypt (first and second dynasties), the brick temples of Sumeria, and the first cities of the Harappa culture in India, and a century or two earlier than the Golden Age of China. Unusually fine for their early date, and with a remarkably rich survival of evidence, these sites stand as a visible symbol of the achievements of early peoples away from the traditional centres of civilisation...The Ring of Brodgar is the finest known truly circular late Neolithic or early Bronze Age stone ring and a later expression of the spirit which gave rise to Maeshowe, Stenness and Skara Brae

=== Access ===
Access at the Ring of Brodgar, especially to the inner ring, poses conservation issues. Site management has included periods of partial site closure, required to allow areas of footpath to recover.

== Cultural impact ==
The Ring of Brodgar features in Kathleen Fidler's 1968 novel The Boy with the Bronze Axe; here, it is depicted in a midsummer ceremony in which a lamb is sacrificed. In Fidler's story, women are forbidden from entering the Ring, which is a male-only space.

In Troika Games 2001 title Arcanum: Of Steamworks and Magick Obscura, the Ring of Brodgar appears in the town of Roseborough and is pivotal to the plot.

== See also ==
- Prehistoric Orkney
- Stone circles in the British Isles and Brittany
- List of stone circles
