= Heart of Neolithic Orkney =

UNESCO World Heritage Site
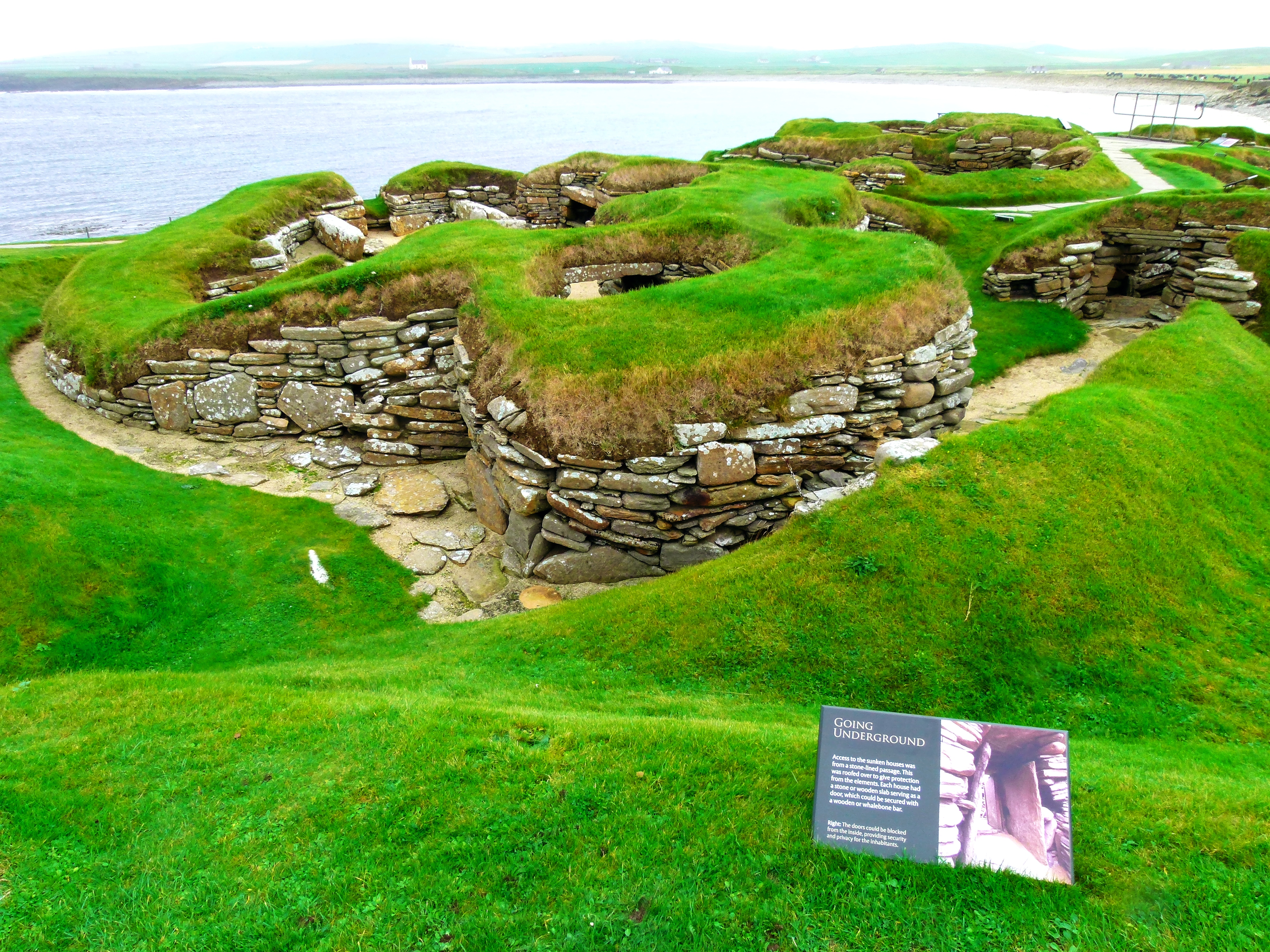
- Excavated dwellings at Skara Brae, Europe's most complete Neolithic village.

- Location within Scotland Location within the United Kingdom
- Location: Orkney, Scotland
- Includes: 1. Maeshowe; 2. Stones of Stenness; 3. Ring of Brodgar; 4. Skara Brae
- Criteria: Cultural: (i), (ii), (iii), (iv)
- Reference: 514bis
- Inscription: 1999 (23rd Session)
- Extensions: 2015
- Area: 15 ha (37 acres)
- Buffer zone: 6,258 ha (15,460 acres)
- Coordinates: 58°59′51″N 3°12′54″W

Heart of Neolithic Orkney is a group of Neolithic monuments on the Mainland of the Orkney Islands, Scotland. The name was adopted by UNESCO when it proclaimed these sites as a World Heritage Site on 2 December 1999.

== Grouping ==
The site of patrimony currently consists of four sites:

1. Maeshowe – a chambered cairn and passage grave, aligned so that its central chamber is illuminated on the winter solstice. It was looted by Vikings who left one of the largest collections of runic inscriptions in the world.
2. Standing Stones of Stenness – the four remaining megaliths of a henge, the largest of which is 6 metres (19 ft) high.
3. Ring of Brodgar – a stone circle 104 metres in diameter, originally composed of 60 stones set within a circular ditch up to 3 metres deep and 10 metres wide, forming a henge monument. It has been estimated that the structure took 80,000 man-hours to construct.
4. Skara Brae – a cluster of ten structures making up Northern Europe’s best-preserved Neolithic village.

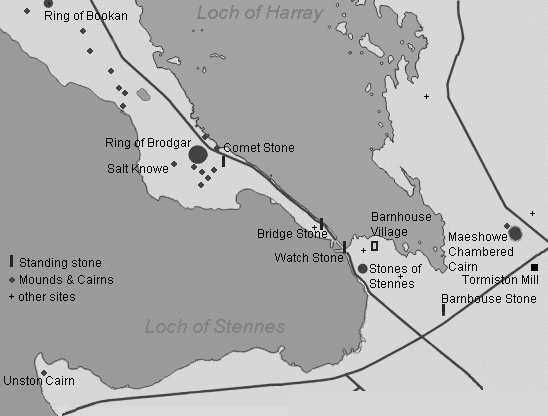
Map of the main site

== History ==
Ness of Brodgar is an archaeological site between the Ring of Brodgar and the Stones of Stenness that has provided evidence of housing, decorated stone slabs, a massive stone wall with foundations, and a large building described as a Neolithic "cathedral". Although it is not part of the World Heritage Site, the Ness of Brodgar "contribute[s] greatly to our understanding of the WHS" according to Historic Scotland, which manages most of the site.

In 2008, UNESCO expressed concern about plans by the local council to "erect three large 72 metres wind turbines to the north-west of the Stones of Stenness and the Ring of Brogdar" that might damage the site. In 2019, a risk assessment was performed to assess the site's vulnerability to climate change. The report by Historic Environment Scotland, the Orkney Islands Council and others concludes that the entire World Heritage Site, and in particular Skara Brae, is "extremely vulnerable" to climate change due to rising sea levels, increased rainfall and other factors; it also highlights the risk that Skara Brae could be partially destroyed by one unusually severe storm.

The first application of the Climate Vulnerability Index to a Cultural World Heritage property took place at the Heart of Neolithic Orkney in April 2019.

== See also ==
- Banknotes of Scotland (featured on design)
- Prehistoric Scotland
- Timeline of prehistoric Scotland
- Oldest buildings in Scotland
- Oldest buildings in the world
