= Standing Stones of Stenness =

Henge in Orkney Islands, Scotland

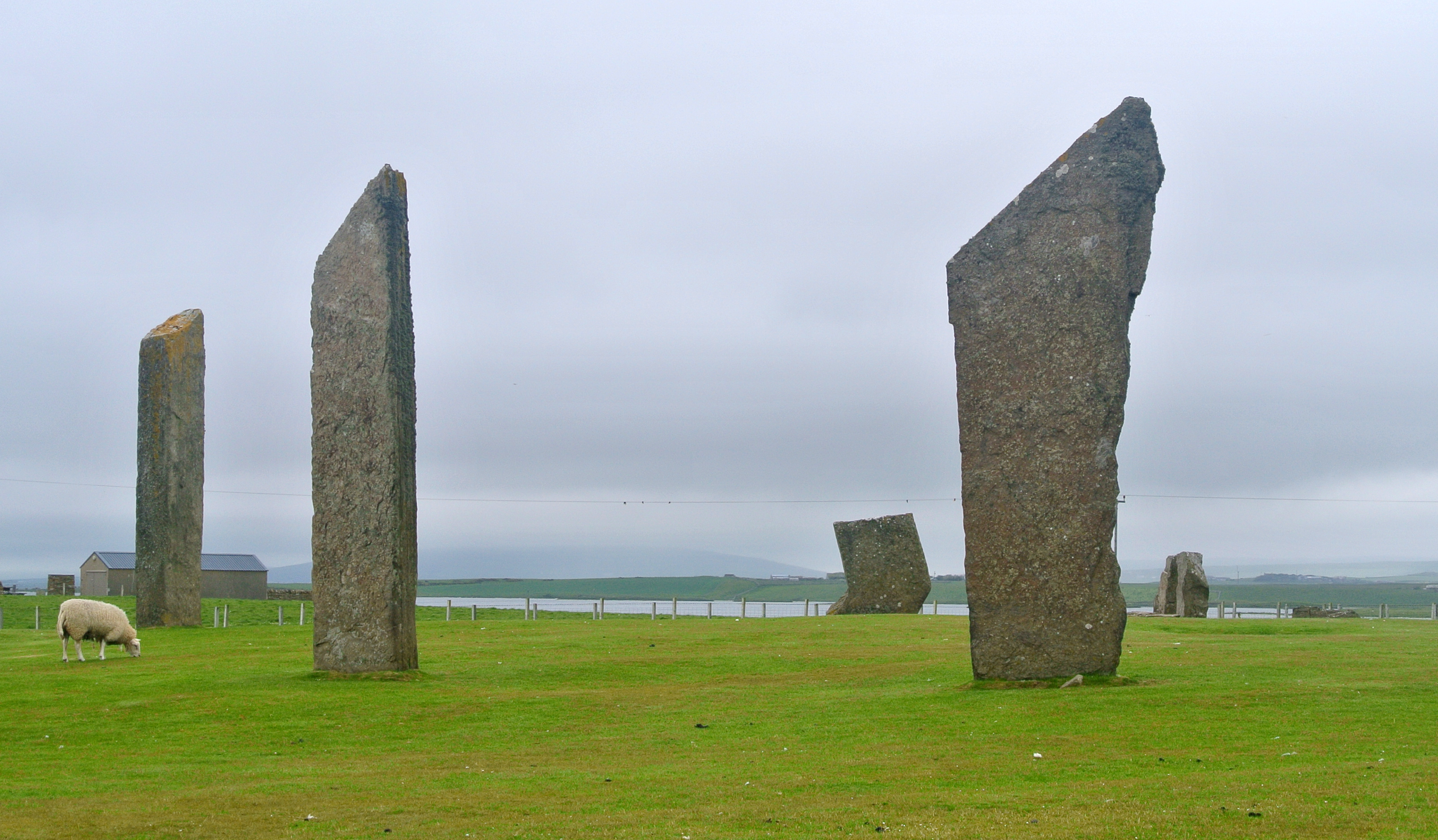
- The stones in 2015

- Location within Orkney Islands
- 58°59′38″N 3°12′29″W
- Type: Standing stones
- Periods: Neolithic
- Location: Scotland, United Kingdom

History
- Built: c. 3100 BC

Site notes
- Material: Stone
- Owner: Historic Environment Scotland
- Public access: Yes

Identifiers
- HES: SM90285

UNESCO World Heritage Site
- Type: Cultural
- Criteria: i, ii, iii, iv
- Designated: 1999 (23rd session)
- Part of: Heart of Neolithic Orkney
- Reference no.: 514
- Region: Europe and North America

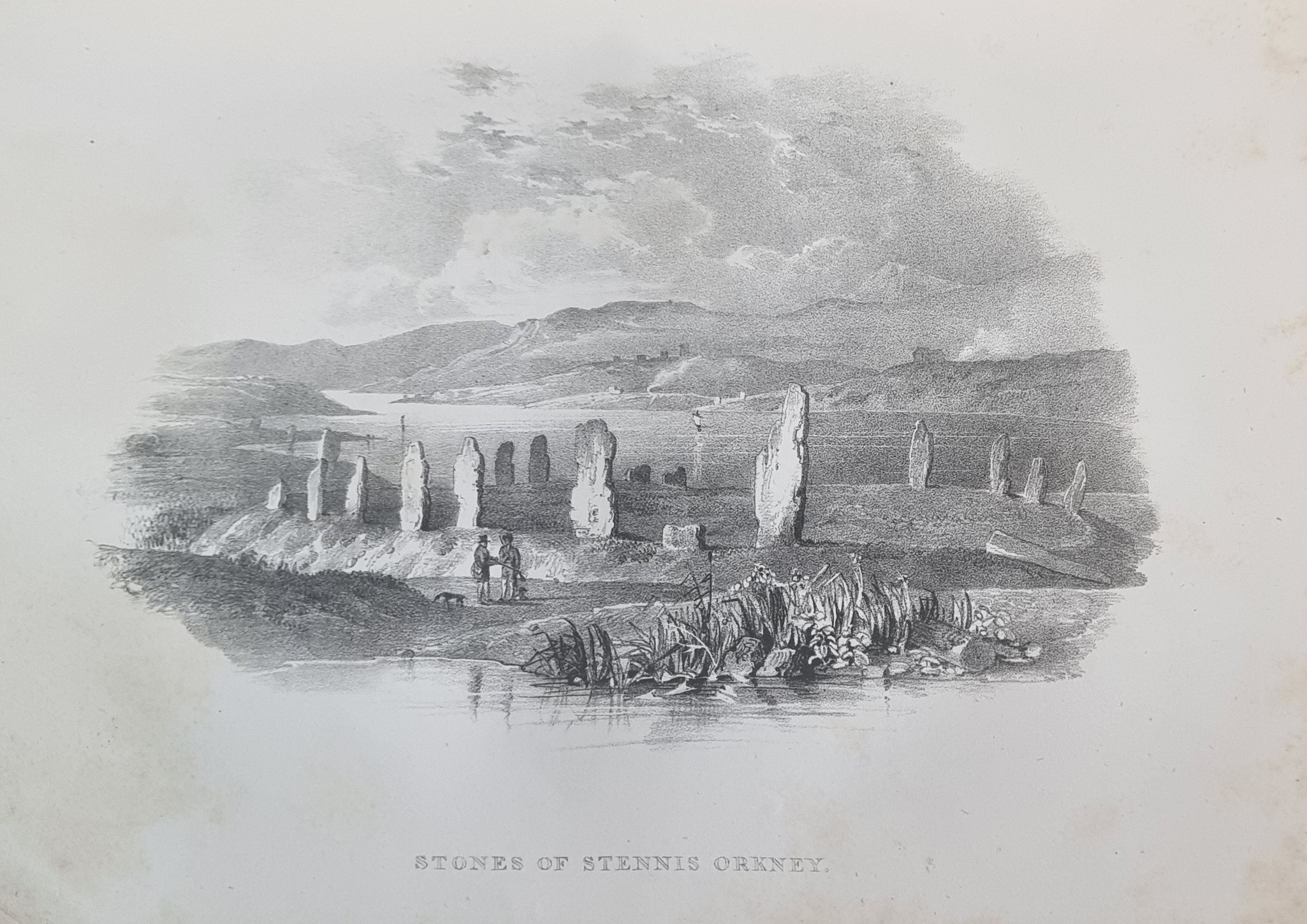
Stones of Stenness, Orkney, Scotland, 1829

The Standing Stones of Stenness are a Neolithic monument five miles northeast of Stromness on the mainland of Orkney, Scotland. This may be the oldest henge site in the British Isles. Various traditions associated with the stones survived into the modern era and they form part of the Heart of Neolithic Orkney World Heritage Site. They are cared for by Historic Environment Scotland as a scheduled monument.

== Layout and location ==
The surviving stones are sited on a promontory at the south bank of the stream that joins the southern ends of the sea loch Loch of Stenness and the freshwater Loch of Harray. The name, which is pronounced stane-is in Orcadian dialect, comes from Old Norse meaning stone headland. The stream is now bridged, but at one time was crossed by a stepping stone causeway, and the Ring of Brodgar lies about 1.2 km (0.75 mi) away to the north-west, across the stream and near the tip of the isthmus formed between the two lochs. Maeshowe chambered cairn is about 1.2 km (0.75 mi) to the east of the Standing Stones of Stenness and several other Neolithic monuments also lie in the vicinity, suggesting that this area had particular importance.

Although the site today lacks the encircling ditch and bank, excavation has shown this site was a henge monument, possibly the oldest in the British Isles. The stones are thin slabs, approximately 30 cm (12 in) thick with sharply angled tops. Four, up to about 5 m (16 ft) high, were originally elements of a stone circle of up to 12 stones, laid out in an ellipse about 32 m (105 ft) diameter on a levelled platform of 44 m (144 ft) diameter surrounded by a ditch. The ditch is cut into rock by as much as 2 m (6.6 ft) and is 7 m (23 ft) wide, surrounded by an earth bank, with a single entrance causeway on the north side. The entrance faces towards the Neolithic Barnhouse Settlement which has been found adjacent to the Loch of Harray.

The Watch Stone stands outside the circle to the north-west and is 5.6 m (18 ft) high. Once there were at least two stones there, as in the 1930s the stump of a second stone was found. Other smaller stones include a square stone setting in the centre of the circle platform where cremated bone, charcoal and pottery were found. This is referred to as a "hearth", similar to the one found at Barnhouse. Animal bones were found in the ditch. The pottery links the monument to Skara Brae and Maeshowe. Based on radiocarbon dating, it is thought that work on the site had begun by 3100 BCE.

== Traditions and history ==
Let us imagine, then, families approaching Stenness at the appointed time of year, men, women and children, carrying bundles of bones collected together from the skeletons of disinterred corpses–skulls, mandibles, long bones–carrying also the skulls of totem animals, herding a beast that was one of several to be slaughtered for the feasting that would accompany the ceremonies.

— Aubrey Burl (1981) Rites of the Gods.

Even in the 18th century the site was still associated with traditions and rituals, by then relating to Norse gods. It was visited by Walter Scott in 1814. Other antiquarians documented the stones and recorded local traditions and beliefs about them. One stone, known as the "Odin Stone" which stood in the field to the north of the henge, was pierced with a circular hole, and was used by local couples for plighting engagements by holding hands through the gap. It was also associated with other ceremonies and believed to have magical power.

There was a reported tradition of making all kinds of oaths or promises with one's hand in the Odin Stone; this was known as taking the "Vow of Odin".

In December 1814, Captain W. Mackay, a recent immigrant to Orkney who owned farmland in the vicinity of the stones, decided to remove them on the grounds that local people were trespassing and disturbing his land by using the stones in rituals. He started in December 1814 by smashing the Odin Stone. This caused outrage and he was stopped after destroying another stone and toppling a third.

The toppled stone was re-erected in 1906 along with some inaccurate reconstruction inside the circle.

In the 1970s, a dolmen structure was toppled, since there were doubts as to its authenticity. The two upright stones remain in place.

== Influence on popular culture ==
- A picture of the Stones of Stenness features on the cover of Van Morrison's album The Philosopher's Stone.
- The Odin stone is depicted on Julian Cope's album Discover Odin.
- The stones are also the setting for the Loreena McKennitt song "Standing Stones" from her album Parallel Dreams. The lyrics describe a pair of star-crossed lovers who meet at the Odin stone, only for the man to meet a tragic fate.
- Odin Stone is the name of a darkwave band formed in 2021, with members in USA and Portugal

== World Heritage status ==
The Heart of Neolithic Orkney was inscribed as a World Heritage site in December 1999. In addition to the Standing Stones of Stenness, the site includes Maeshowe, Skara Brae, the Ring of Brodgar and other nearby sites. It is managed by Historic Environment Scotland, whose 'Statement of Significance' for the site begins:

The monuments at the heart of Neolithic Orkney and Skara Brae proclaim the triumphs of the human spirit in early ages and isolated places. They were approximately contemporary with the mastabas of the archaic period of Egypt (first and second dynasties), the brick temples of Sumeria, and the first cities of the Harappa culture in India, and a century or two earlier than the Golden Age of China. Unusually fine for their early date, and with a remarkably rich survival of evidence, these sites stand as a visible symbol of the achievements of early peoples away from the traditional centres of civilisation...Stenness is a unique and early expression of the ritual customs of the people who buried their dead in tombs like Maes Howe and lived in settlements like Skara Brae.

== Gallery ==
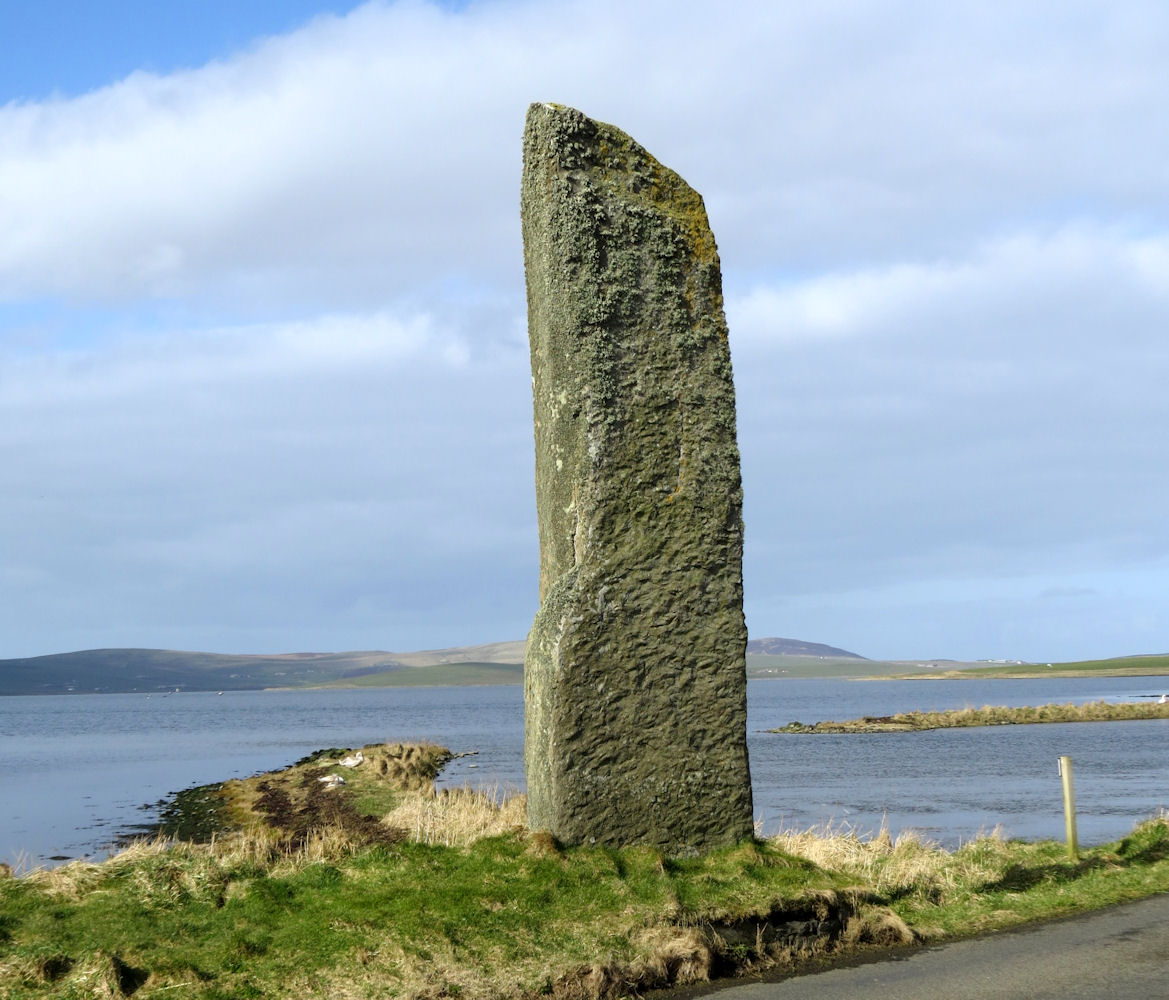
The Stenness Watch Stone stands outside the circle, next to the modern bridge leading to the Ring of Brodgar

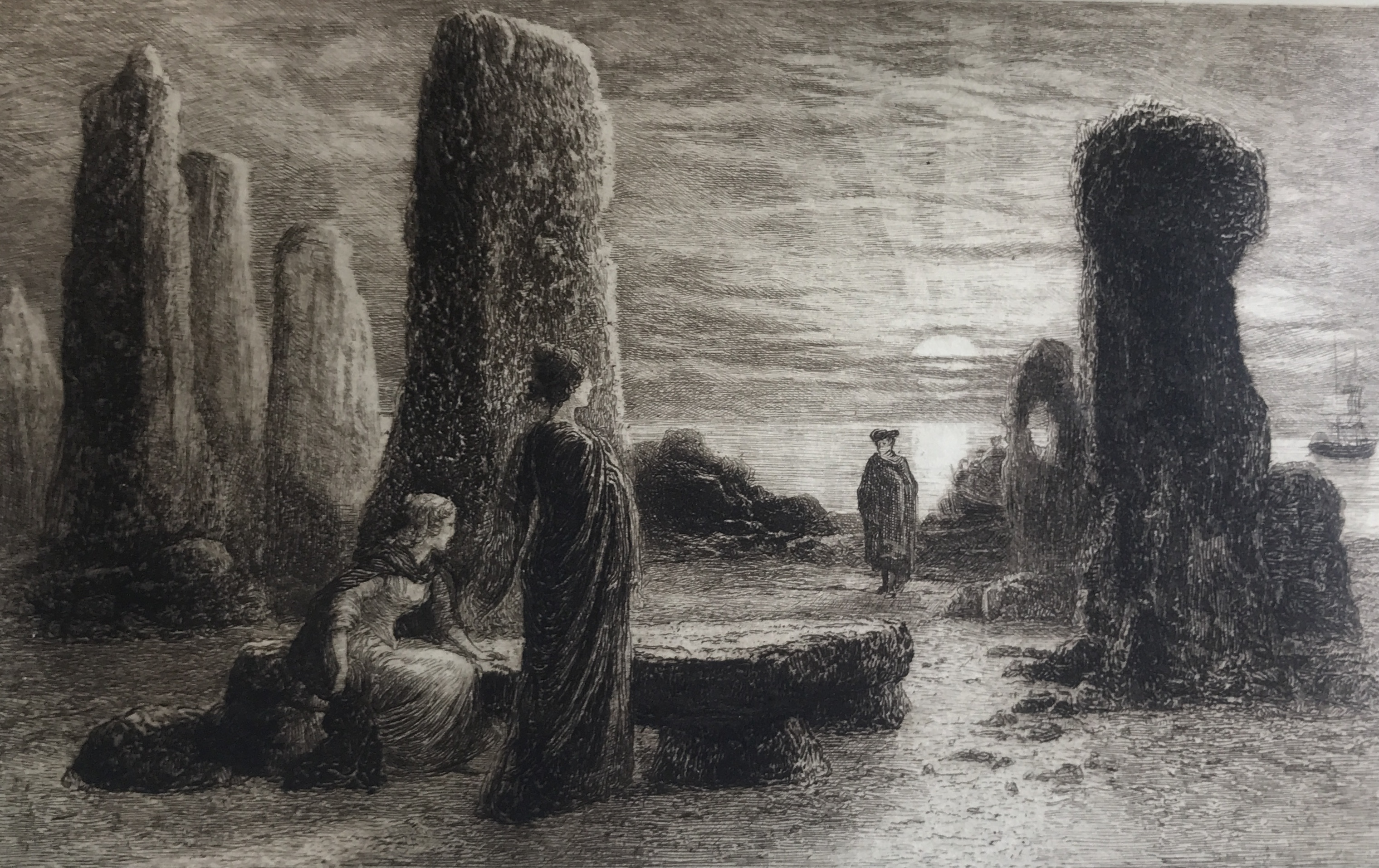
Etching by Francis S. Walker (1893)

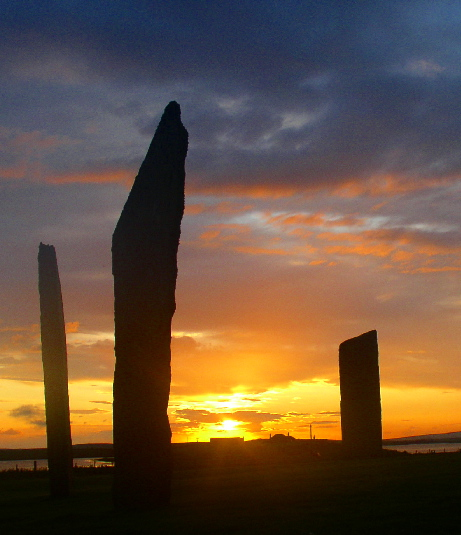
Sunset at the Standing Stones of Stenness

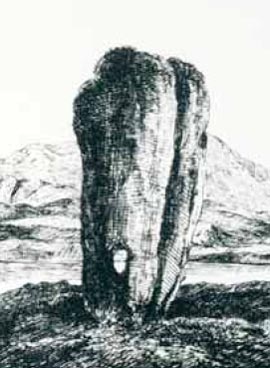
An 18th-century engraving of the Odin Stone

== Bibliography ==
- Burl, Aubrey (1981). Rites of the Gods. London, UK: Weidenfeld & Nicolson. ISBN 978-0460043137.
- Piggott, Stuart (1982). Scotland Before History. Edinburgh University Press. ISBN 0-85224-348-0.
- Armit, Ian (1998). Scotland's Hidden History. Tempus / Historic Scotland. ISBN 0-7486-6067-4.
- Feachem, Richard (1977). Guide to Prehistoric Scotland. B.T. Batsford Ltd. ISBN 0-7134-3264-0.
- Ritchie, Graham; Ritchie, Anna (1997). Scotland: Archaeology and early history. Edinburgh University Press. ISBN 0-7486-0291-7.
- Richards, Colin (2013). Building the Great Stone Circles of the North. Windgather Press. ISBN 978-1-909686-12-0.
- Ritchie, J.N. Graham. The Stones of Stenness, Orkney – via Archaeology Data Service (archaeologydataservice.ac.uk).
