= Climate Vulnerability Index =

The Climate Vulnerability Index (CVI), also referred to as Climate Change Vulnerability Index (CCVI), is a tool that identifies places that are susceptible to floods and heat-related effects of climate change by combining built, social, and ecological elements. It is also described as a systematic tool to rapidly assess climate change risk. The Climate Vulnerability Index has been used to extensively analysis the impacts of climate change on World Heritage Properties.

These mapping methods can be used to examine vulnerability at both a regional and local level to understand the relevant elements.

The CVI draws on over 180 datasets to provide detailed, census-tract-level assessments, aggregating information across domains like health, infrastructure, environment, and social and economic status. People, infrastructure, and/or ecological resources are more likely to suffer harm in areas that are more sensitive to climate change as temperatures rise, floods get worse, and high winds get stronger.

Climate vulnerability includes a number of aspects such as physical exposure, sensitivity to injury, and a lack of coping and adaptability skills. Understanding vulnerability enables us to make choices about the distribution of resources, the formulation of policies, and the prioritizing, siting, and design of projects.

In the US, the CVI was used to comprehensively screen counties throughout the nation, providing policymakers and communities with cumulative data on the multi-dimensional susceptibilities of communities to climate-related risks. According to the CVI, as of 2023, these are the most vulnerable U.S. counties:

1. John the Baptist, Louisiana
2. Iberville, Louisiana
3. Knox, Kentucky
4. Landry, Louisiana
5. Dillon, South Carolina
6. Tangipahoa, Louisiana
7. Acadia, Louisiana
8. Floyd, Kentucky
9. Jefferson, Texas
10. Whitley, Kentucky
