= Loch of Harray =

- Harray lch
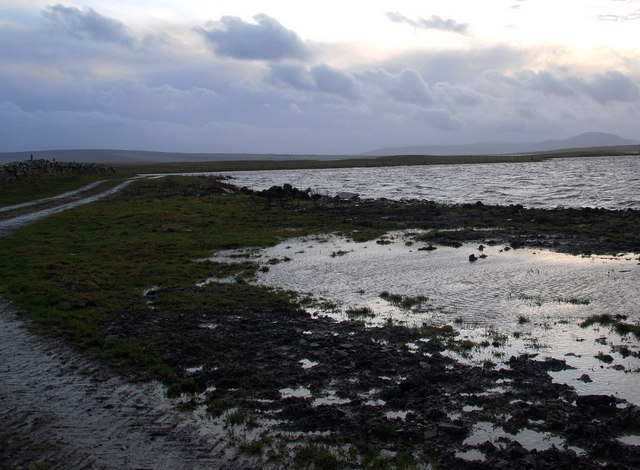
- Looking southwards along the shoreline

- Location within Orkney Islands
- Location: Mainland Orkney, Scotland
- Coordinates: 59°1′24″N 3°13′40″W
- Type: freshwater loch
- Primary inflows: Burn of Hourston and Burn of Netherbrough
- Primary outflows: Loch of Stenness
- Catchment area: 45 mi^{2} (120 km^{2})
- Basin countries: Scotland
- Max. length: 4.66 mi (7.50 km)
- Max. width: 1.75 mi (2.82 km)
- Surface area: 3.75 mi^{2} (9.7 km^{2})
- Average depth: 9 ft (2.7 m)
- Max. depth: 14 ft (4.3 m)
- Water volume: 951,000,000 ft^{3} (26,900,000 m^{3})
- Surface elevation: 3.6 ft (1.1 m)
- Islands: several islets and stones

The Loch of Harray is the largest loch of Mainland Orkney, Scotland and is named for the parish of Harray. It lies immediately north of the Loch of Stenness and is close to the World Heritage neolithic sites of the Stones of Stenness and Ring of Brodgar. In Old Norse its name was Heraðvatn.

== Hydrology ==
The loch was surveyed on 21 August 1903 by Sir John Murray and later charted as part of the Bathymetrical Survey of Fresh-Water Lochs of Scotland 1897-1909. Murray observed that Loch of Harray is a freshwater loch, the largest in all Orkney with an area of approximately 3.75 square miles (9.7 square kilometres) and volume of 951,000,000 cubic feet (0.0269 km^{3}) and that it is somewhat influenced by the tides in the Hoy Sound although there is little variation in its level. The loch is connected to the Loch of Stenness at the Bridge of Brodgar. The two lochs together cover an area of 19.3 square kilometres (7.5 square miles) making the two combined the ninth largest loch in Scotland by area (as listed by Murray and Pullar (1910)). Murray recorded that despite there being an inlet allowing the free flow of water from the Loch of Stenness it has little impact on the biology of Harray and no seaweed was present, the water tasted fresh and normal freshwater plankton were seen.

== Natural history ==
The loch is a Site of Special Scientific Interest and has a large number of pondweed species three of which are scarce, a rare caddis fly (Ylodes reuteri) and is the only known site in Scotland for a nerite snail Theodoxus fluviatilis which is more commonly found in English rivers. A wide variety of wildfowl winter at the loch including pochard, tufted duck, scaup and goldeneye. It has been designated an Important Bird Area (IBA) by BirdLife International because it supports populations of waterbirds.
