= UHI Orkney =

College in Scotland

Coordinates: 58°59′11″N 2°56′52″W

Orkney College UHI
- Type: College
- Established: 1995
- Affiliations: University of the Highlands and Islands,
- Location: Kirkwall, Orkney, Scotland
- Website: www.orkney.uhi.ac.uk

Orkney College is a further and higher education college in Orkney, an archipelago in northern Scotland. It is an academic partner in the University of the Highlands and Islands.

The college serves the Orkney community, which is rural and has long had an economy based on agriculture and fishing. Its main campus is a purpose-built site opened in 2000 on the outskirts of Kirkwall. It is one of very few non-incorporated colleges in Scotland and is the responsibility of the Orkney Islands Council, which has devolved many powers, including management, funding and staffing to the College Management Council.

The college has strong links with agriculture and opened an Agronomy Institute in 2002.

Orkney College's courses provide students of all ages with a full range of qualifications from Scottish Vocational Qualifications, Scottish Group Awards (Higher Still) through Higher National Certificate and Diploma to Degree and postgraduate Degree Level. It hosts research in agronomy, archaeology, cultural studies, geophysics, Nordic studies, language and literature.

== Maritime training ==
The college conducts vocational training for the merchant navy personnel. These are MCA and RYA certified. Some of them are:

- Marine Vessel Operations
- Short Courses for seagoing officers.
- RYA courses.

== See also ==
- Education in Scotland
- List of further and higher education colleges in Scotland
