= List of lochs of Orkney =

This is a list of the named lochs of Orkney, Scotland. There are numerous lochs, both large and small, scattered across the islands of this archipelago.

== List of lochs, by island ==
=== Burray ===
- Echna Loch
- Southtown Loch

=== Damsay ===
- Damsay Lochs

=== Eday ===
- Loch of Bomo (diminutive lochan)
- Loch of Carrick
- Loch of Doomy
- Loch of London
- Mill Loch

=== Egilsay ===
- Manse Loch
- Loch of Watten
- Loch of Welland

=== Flotta ===
- Stanger Loch

=== Holm of Huip ===
- Veltieskerry Loch

=== Hoy ===
- Berry Lochs (two lochans in southwest)
- Lochs of Geniefea (series of lochans north of summit of Genie Fea)
- Heldale Water (largest loch on Hoy)
- Hoglinns Water (second largest loch on Hoy)
- Kit Loch (diminutive lochan)
- Lint Lochs (diminutive lochans)
- Loch of Greenhill (lochan on South Walls)
- Loomi Shuns (diminutive lochans in southwest)
- Muckle Lochs (series of lochans east of Withi Gill)
- Rotten Loch (diminutive lochan in far south)
- Sands Water
- Sandy Loch (reservoir)
- Loch of Stourdale (diminutive lochan near Rora Head)
- Lochs of Withigill (series of lochans on Withi Gill)
- Water of Hoy (beside B9407 at Lyrawa Hill)
- Water of the Wicks (east of Water of Hoy)

=== Mainland ===
- Loch of Ayre
- Loch of Banks
- Loch of Boardhouse
- Loch of Bosquoy
- Loch of Brockan
- Loch of Carness
- Loch of Clumly
- Eves Loch
- Loch of Graemeshall
- Lochs of Griffyelt (three small lochans near Greenigoe)
- Loch of Harray
- Loch of Hestecruive
- Loch of Hundland
- Loch of Isbister
- Loch of Kirbister
- Loch of Lakequoy
- Looma Shun (lochan south of Georth)
- Loomi Shun
- Lowrie's Water (lochan on Burgar Hill)
- Mill Dam of Rango
- Loch of Ouse (lochan in Deerness)
- The Ouse
- Peerie Sea (Kirkwall)
- Peerie Water (lochan in north)
- Loch of Rosemire (lochan west of Dounby)
- Loch of Sabiston
- The Shunan (lochan southeast of Dounby)
- Loch of Skaill
- Loch of Stenness
- Stromness Reservoir (artificial waterbody)
- Loch of Tankerness
- Loch of Swannay
- Loch of Swarsquoy
- Verigens
- Vorskaer Loch
- Loch of Wasdale
- Walliwall Quarry (artificial body of water)
- Wideford Loch

=== North Ronaldsay ===
- Ancum Loch
- Dennis Loch
- Loch of Garso
- Loch Gretchen
- Hooking Loch (largest loch on North Ronaldsay)
- Trolla Vatn

=== Papa Stronsay ===
- Mill Loch

=== Papa Westray ===
- Loch of Hyndgreenie
- Loch of Ness
- Loch of St Tredwell

=== Rousay ===
- Loch of Jan Janet (diminutive lochan)
- Loch of Knitchen
- Loch of Loomachun
- Loch of Moan (diminutive lochan in northwest)
- Muckle Water
- Peerie Water
- Loch of Quoys (diminutive lochan in east)
- Loch of Scockness
- Loch of Wasbister
- Loch of Wasday (diminutive lochan beneath Ward Hill)
- Loch of Withamo (diminutive lochan on Kierfea Hill)

=== Sanday ===
- Bea Loch
- Loch of Brue
- Loch of Langamay
- North Loch
- Roos Loch
- Loch of Rummie
- Westayre Loch

=== Shapinsay ===
- Lairo Water
- Loch of Sandside
- Little Vasa Water
- Vasa Loch
- Loch of Westhill

=== South Ronaldsay ===
- Dam of Hoxa
- Gairy Lochs
- Graemston Loch
- Liddel Loch
- Loch of Lythe
- Sounds Loch
- Trena Loch

=== Start Point ===
- Start Loch

=== Stronsay ===
- Blan Water
- Bruce's Loch
- Gricey Water
- Lea Shun
- Little Water
- Loch of Matpow
- Meikle Water
- Loch of Rothiesholm
- Straenia Water

=== Swona ===
- Loch of the Tarf

=== Westray ===
- Loch of Burness
- Craig Loch
- Muckle Water (lochan in south)
- Loch Saintear
- Loch of the Stack (near Noup Head)
- Loch of Swartmill

=== Wyre ===
- Loch of Oorns (bog)
- Loch of the Taing
