= Stines Moss =

Coordinates: 58°57′36″N 3°11′17″W

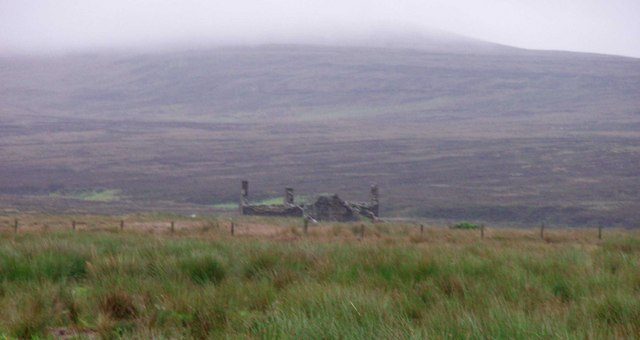
Stines Moss with North Dales in the background.

Stines Moss is an elevated bog in the southwest upland area of the Orkney Mainland, Scotland.

== Prehistory and history ==
This moss is located a few miles south of very significant Neolithic and Iron Age archaeological sites. A few miles to the north are the Standing Stones of Stenness and the Ring of Brodgar. About four miles to the northeast is the Iron Age Maes Howe site.

The Burn of Ayreland flows through this moss, and thence proceeds in a northwesterly direction to power the Mill of Ayreland before discharging to the Clestrain Sound. The mill functioned from the Late Middle Ages until at least the late 1880s and is now a country inn.
