= Mill of Ayreland =

Watermill in Orkney Islands, Scotland

Coordinates: 58.96886°N 3.22757°W

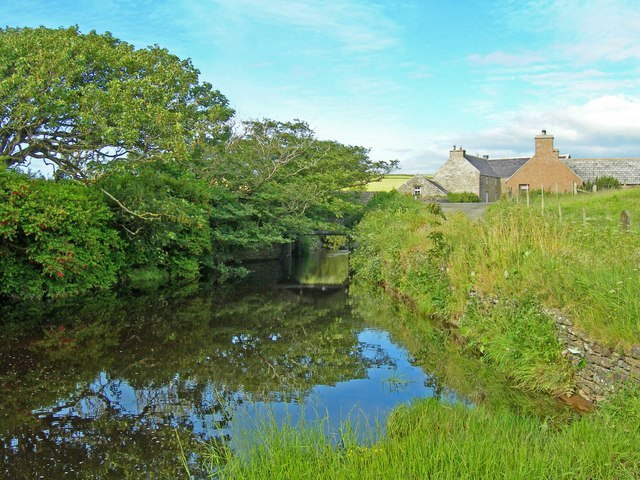
Burn of Ayreland at the Mill of Ireland (Ayreland)

The Mill of Ayreland is an historic watermill driven by water force of the Burn of Ayreland, a northwesterly flowing coastal stream within Mainland Orkney, Scotland, that empties into the Clestrain Sound approximately five kilometres southerly of Stenness.

== Prehistory and history ==
This watermill is located several miles south of important Neolithic and Iron Age archaeological sites. Several kilometres to the north are the Standing Stones of Stenness and the Ring of Brodgar. About three miles to the northeast is the Iron Age Maes Howe ancient site.

The Burn of Ayreland had supplied the Mill of Ayreland with water power since the Late Middle Ages; this watermill functioned into at least the late 1880s. The mill now functions as a country inn.

== See also ==
- Stines Moss
- Waulkmill Bay
