= Loch of Skaill =

Loch of Orkney, Scotland

- Skaill loch
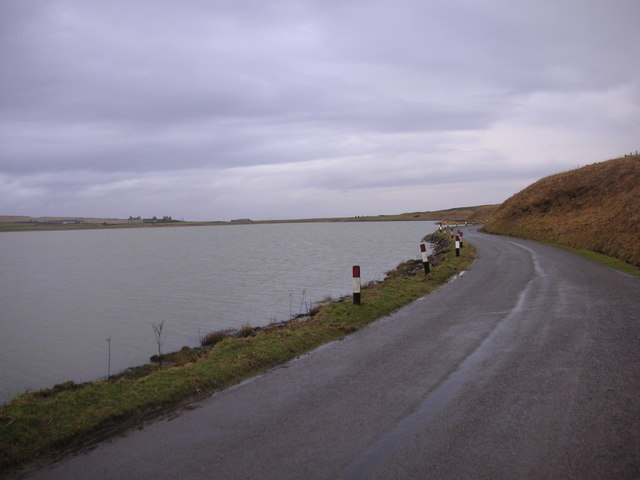

- Location within Orkney Islands
- Location: Mainland Orkney, Scotland
- Coordinates: 59.0432°N 3.3232°W
- Type: freshwater loch
- Primary outflows: small burn on north west shore
- Basin countries: Scotland
- Max. length: 1 mi (1.6 km)
- Max. width: 0.5 mi (0.80 km)
- Surface area: 60.9 ha (150 acres)
- Average depth: 2 ft (0.61 m)
- Max. depth: 4 ft (1.2 m)
- Water volume: 14,000,000 ft^{3} (400,000 m^{3})
- Surface elevation: 7 m (23 ft)

The Loch of Skaill is a small somewhat triangular, freshwater loch in the parish of Sandwick, Orkney on Mainland Orkney, Scotland. It lies 0.5 mi (0.80 km) south east of the Bay of Skaill close to Skaill House and the World Heritage neolithic site Skara Brae.

The loch is popular for trout fishing and is reserved for use by members of The Orkney Trout Fishing Association only. The average size of the trout caught in the loch is 2 pounds (0.91 kg).

The loch was surveyed in 1906 by James Murray and later charted as part of The Bathymetrical Survey of Fresh-Water Lochs of Scotland 1897–1909. A small burn at the north western shore drains the loch in to the Bay of Skaill and was noted in the Survey that it was used as a mill stream.
