= Historic Churches Scotland =

Redundant church preservation charity

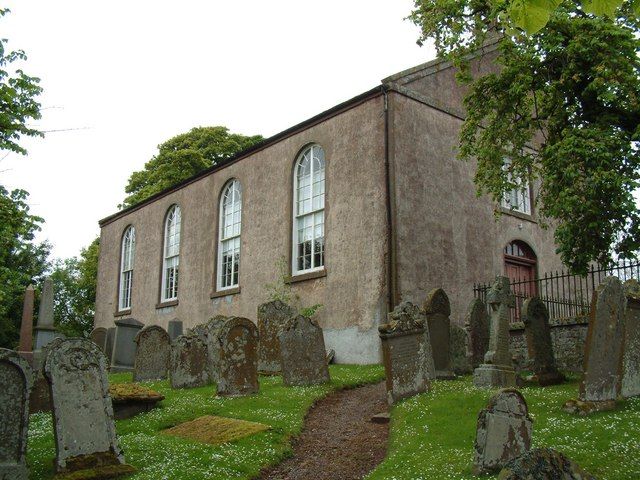
St Marnoch's Kirk, Benholm. The trust acquired this church following its closure in 2003.

Historic Churches Scotland (formerly the Scottish Redundant Churches Trust) is a registered charity founded in 1996 which looks after Scottish churches which are of outstanding historic or architectural significance but are no longer used for regular worship. The Trust receives funding from Historic Scotland and public donations. Funding for restoration of churches in Trust ownership is received from the Heritage Lottery Fund, Historic Scotland, the Listed Places of Worship Grant Scheme, the Scottish Churches Architectural Heritage Trust, and other trusts and public donations.

The Trust conserves and repairs all of the churches in its care and runs a range of projects to encourage greater public enjoyment and understanding of historic churches. Many of its buildings are used for community, arts and educational activities. All remain as places of worship and occasional services are held.

The Trust presently maintains seven properties throughout Scotland: St Peter's Church, Sandwick in Orkney (acquired 1998), Cromarty East Church in Ross-shire (acquired 1998), Pettinain Church in Lanarkshire (acquired 2000), Tibbermore Church in Perthshire (acquired 2001), Benholm Kirk, Kincardineshire (acquired 2006), Kildrummy Kirk (acquired 2009), and St Margaret's Church, Braemar (acquired 2013). The Trust changed its name to Historic Churches Scotland in January 2019.

== Key ==
Category	Criteria
A	Buildings of national or international importance, either architectural or historic, or fine little-altered examples of some particular period, style or building type.
B	Buildings of regional or more than local importance, or major examples of some particular period, style or building type which may have been altered.
C	Buildings of local importance, lesser examples of any period, style, or building type, as originally constructed or moderately altered; and simple traditional buildings which group well with others in categories A and B.

== List of properties ==
Name	Location	Image	Date^{[A]}	Notes	Category
Cromarty East Church	Cromarty, Ross-shire; 57.680288°N 4.031965°W	A long, slightly shabby looking chapel, whitewashed with a small belfry. Many different-sized windows are visible.	18th century	Formerly Church of Scotland, the kirk was founded in the late 16th century but the building dates largely from the 18th century. The north aisle was added 1739 to create a T-plan church with further alterations in 1756 and 1798. The interior dates from the 18th century with several galleries added in the decades afterwards, most notably in 1756. The church was acquired by the SRCT in 1996, and was restored after being a finalist in the BBC Restoration Village series. Following this exposure, it was awarded a major grant in 2007 when the Heritage Lottery Fund, Historic Scotland and The Highland Council paid for a £1.3 million restoration.	A
Pettinain Church	Pettinain, Lanarkshire; 55.664729°N 3.66279°W	A grey stone chapel, with angular corners. An ornate bell tower is situated on the west of the building.	18th century	A rural parish kirk with beautiful views over Lanarkshire, the site has been a place of worship since the early 12th century when David I established the chapel of Pedynane. The present church dates principally from the 18th century though it incorporates an earlier belfry dated 1692. There is an old grave-slab with a sword and shears carved on it, in use as a lintel above a window on the south side. The church sits within a walled burial ground. Acquired by the Scottish Redundant Churches Trust in 2000 with the support of local people.	B
St Marnoch's Church	Benholm, Aberdeenshire; 56.8144°N 2.3220°W	A rectangular grey coloured chapel with large windows and small belfrey sits in a steep churchyard.	19th century	Although externally plain, this rural parish kirk dates from 1832 and incorporates a 15th-century sacrament house and 17th century monuments of national importance from an earlier church of dating from the 13th century church which was dedicated to St Marnoch. The church is in a rectangular-plan with four bays, pedimented gables and belfry. Inside the church the 1620 monument to Lady Mary Keith, is a fusion of Renaissance architectural details and traditional symbolism that includes knobbly-kneed death skewering Lady Mary's parents. There is also a sophisticated 1690 Scott Monument in white marble with cherubs, drapery and foliage. Declared redundant in 2003, Benholm Kirk was purchased by the SRCT in February 2006 with the support of the local community.	A
St Peter's Church	Sandwick, Orkney; 59.058269°N 3.337294°W	A large cream-coloured chapel, with two tall windows in the centre, a small belfrey and a slate roof. The sea is visible in the background.	19th century	An unaltered former Church of Scotland Parish Kirk of 1836 situated on an exposed site near the Bay of Skaill, the interior "evokes the experience of Presbyterian worship in the 19th century" when over 500 people attended the church. It was acquired by the Trust in 1998 and restored between 2002–3. St Peter's was the first major conservation project undertaken by the Trust. This building was on the Buildings at Risk Register for Scotland and rescued with the aid of £250,000 in grants. The restoration was awarded a Europa Nostra Award for conservation in 2003.	A
Tibbermore Church	Tibbermore, Perthshire; 56.395096°N 3.538963°W	A severe, grey single-storey chapel with Georgian windows and small bellcote. The churchyard has lines of headstones in neat rows.	17th century	The present building dates from 1632, although the site has been a place of worship from the Middle Ages onwards. The church was enlarged in 1789 to designs by James Scobie, and remodelled into a T-plan formation in 1808. The bellcote must have undergone reconstruction at this time, as it is inscribed with the date 1808 on its south face. The interior was refurnished in 1874 and is little altered since that date. The graveyard contains several monuments of interest, in particular a memorial to curler James Ritchie, displaying his curling equipment. Transferred to the Trust in 2001.	B
Kildrummy Kirk	Kildrummy, Aberdeenshire; 57.245136°N 2.876556°W	Kildrummy Kirk	19th century	Former Church of Scotland parish church of 1805 set in open countryside and a prominent landmark on the Huntly to Banchory road. Adjoining it, on a raised mound, are the remains of the former medieval parish church of St Bride. The kirk is almost square in plan with a semicircular bay containing the gallery stair and entrance. Construction is of dressed rubble with pinnings and cherry cocking under a piend slate roof. The roof is a particularly fine feature of the building, combined with the ball finialed square domed bellcote. The two large Gothic tracery windows on the east wall flood the interior with light. The pulpit is placed between them and surrounded by plain wooden pews and a horseshoe gallery on square columns. The furnishings probably date from 1845 to 1850.	A
St Margaret's Church	Braemar, Aberdeenshire 57.0057°N 3.3971°W	St Margaret's Church, Braemar	20th century	The former Scottish Episcopal Church was designed by Sir Ninian Comper and completed in 1907. Described by Historic Scotland as "a remarkable example of a late Gothic Revival church", it is considered to be "a rare survival of Comper's work in a substantially unaltered state". Built largely for English tourists spending the summer at "Royal Deeside", its construction cost £8,000. Regular worship ceased in 1997, and in 2003 the church was placed on the Buildings at Risk Register for Scotland. The SRCT and the Prince's Regeneration Trust undertook feasibility studies, and on 17 June 2013 the church was transferred to the SCRT for the sum of £1. The Trust propose to renovate the building as "an arts hub, performance venue, and as a home for a new Braemar fiddle school".	A

== Notes ==
^{A} This is the date of first construction of the existing building.
