= 4th millennium BC in architecture =

The following events occurred in architecture in the 4th millennium BC:

== Buildings and structures ==
=== Buildings ===
- Sialk ziggurat near Kashan, Iran (3200BCE)
- Ġgantija – megalithic temple complex on the island of Gozo (part of Malta, c.3600–2500 BCE)
- Harappa – fortified city of the Indus Valley civilization with as many as 40,000 residents (3300–1600 BCE)

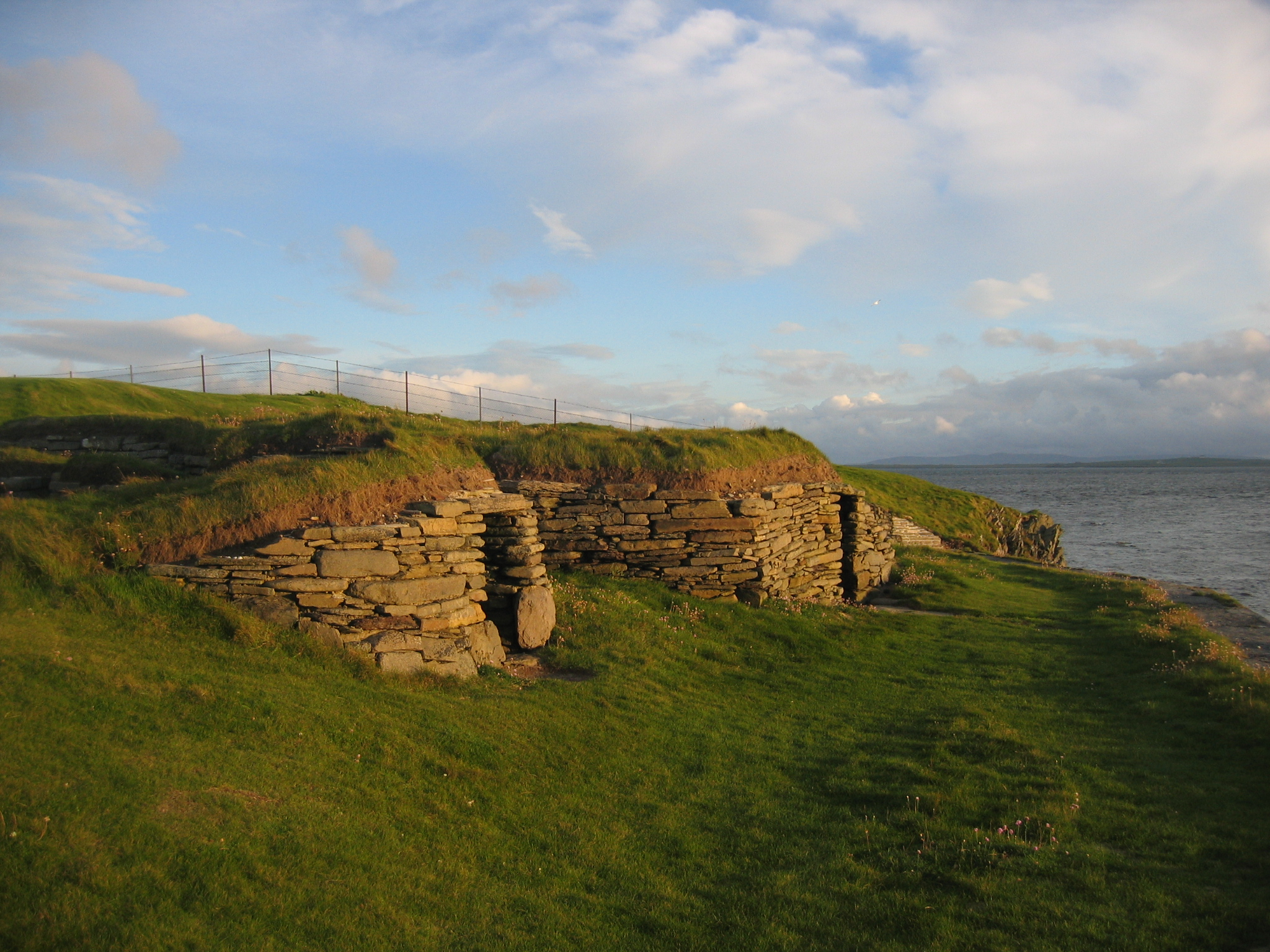
Knap of Howar on Orkney island

- Northern Europe
  - Céide Fields – oldest known field systems in the world, located in West Ireland
  - Brú na Bóinne complex – Neolithic passage tombs in County Meath, Ireland (c.3300–2900 BCE)
  - Knap of Howar – oldest preserved stone house in northern Europe, on the Orkney island of Papa Westray occupied from 3500 to 3100 BCE
  - Skara Brae – Europe's most complete Neolithic village located in the Bay of Skaill in Orkney, Scotland
  - Stonehenge – the earliest phase of the monument has been dated to about 3100 BCE
  - Sweet Track – oldest known engineered roadway located in Shapwick, Somerset, England (3806 BCE)

== See also ==
- Timeline of architecture
