= Brig o' Waithe =

Road bridge in Scotland

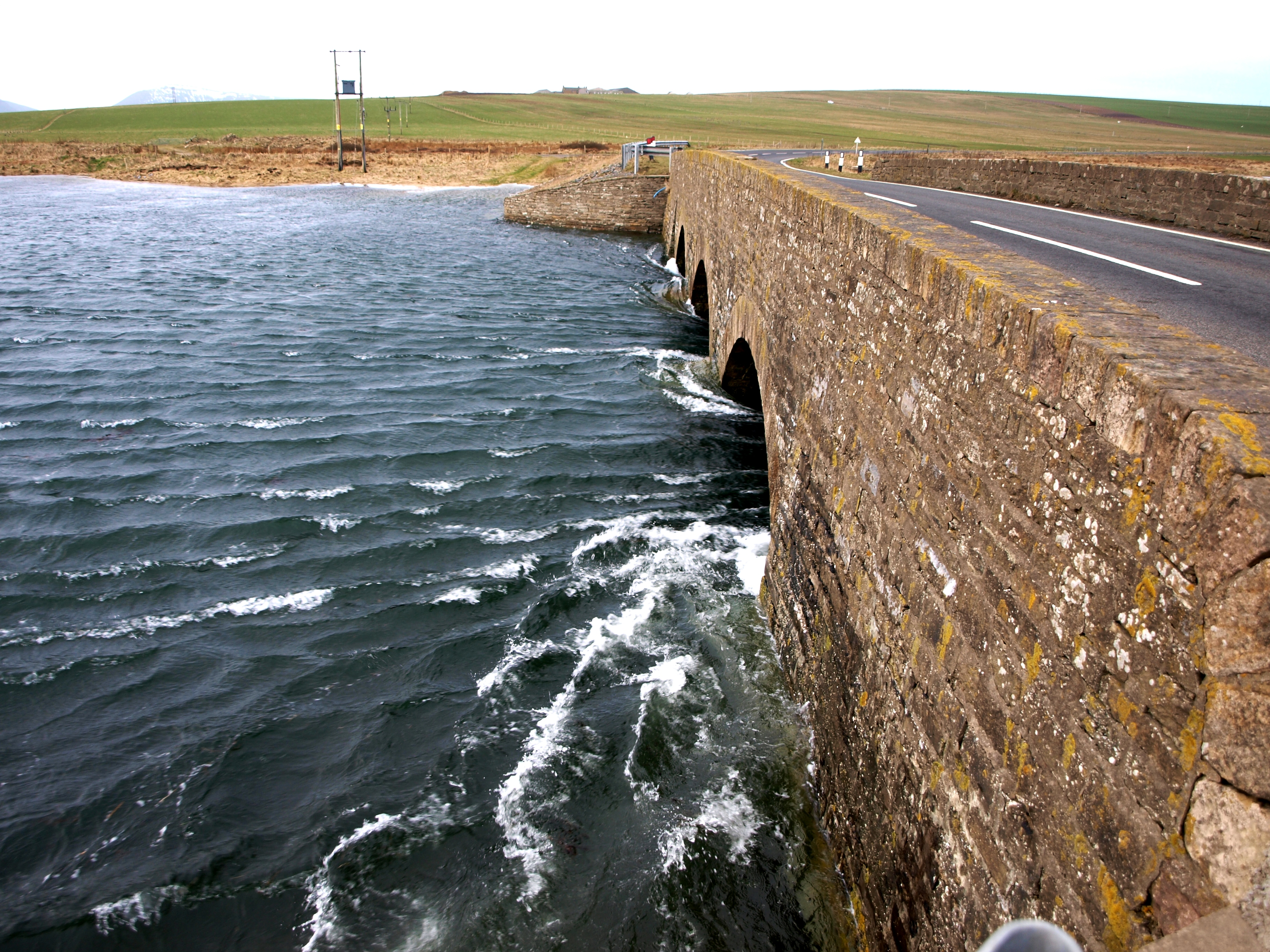
- Bridge crossing the mouth of Stenness Loch
- Coordinates: 58.98249°N 3.25173°W
- OS grid reference: HY 28149 11267
- Carries: A965
- Crosses: Mouth of Stenness Loch
- Locale: Orkney

Characteristics
- Design: Arch
- Material: Stone
- No. of spans: 3

History
- Construction end: 1859

Listed Building – Category C(S)
- Official name: Bridge of Waithe
- Designated: 9 December 1977
- Reference no.: LB18604

Location
- Interactive map of Brig o' Waithe

The Brig o' Waithe is a bridge in Stenness, Orkney, Scotland. The bridge has three stone arches that cross the mouth of the Stenness Loch. It was constructed in 1859 and designated a category C listed building in 1977.

== History ==
Prior to the current stone bridge there was a wooden bridge that had no guard rails. It was a dangerous crossing with several people dying. During WWII the stone bridge had holes drilled in it in preparation for explosives to blow up the bridge. This would have been to prevent the bridge being used if Orkney was ever invaded.

== See also ==
- List of bridges in Scotland
