= Hoy Sound Lighthouses =

Hoysound Lighthouses
- Location: Graemsay, Orkney Isle
- Constructed: 1851
- Automated: 1966

Light
- Range: 12 nautical miles (low) 19 nautical miles (high)

== Introduction ==
Hoy Sound Lighthouses are located on the isle of Graemsay in the Orkney Isles. There are two lighthouses, the Hoy Sound High and Low. Both lighthouses were established in 1851 by Alan Stevenson. The lighthouse structure is a White Stone Tower.

There was a notice from the Commisioners of the Northern Lighthouses to mariners when the Hoy Sound Lighthouses was built. The light was prospected to be exhibited on the Night of Thursday, 15 May, 1851, and every night thereafter, from sunset till sunrise. By compass, the lighthouses bear from each other S.E. 1/4 E, and N.W. 1/4 W. When seen in one line, they lead through the Western Entrance to Hoy Sound, in the fairway, between the dangerous Rocks of Bow, off the Hoy shore and Kirk Rock, off the Stromness Shore. After running in on this line to a point half-a-mile off the Low Light, where the depth is about 8 fathoms, the High Red Light will be suddenly eclipsed by the land; and it is then time to haul towards the Stromness Shore, when the Red Light will immediately reappear.

The progress of the lighthouses construction was published in July 8, 1850 Parliamentary Paper. At that time, the two lighthouses were actively being constructed at Graemsay, will lead to the important and secure anchorage of Stromness, past the dangers which encumber the entrance to Hoy Sound. The towers were designed to serve as 24-hour navigational markers, their visible structures acting as landmarks during daylight and their light beams guiding mariners after dark. At the close of 1848, the foundation had been excavated, and the buildings were only commenced. The works were far advanced towards completion, the masonry of the higher tower almost finished, and the buildings connected with it rooted in. The works of the lower tower were also in progress; and the lights were prospected to be ready for exhibition in the course of the ensuing autumn that year.

== Hoy Sound (High) ==
Hoy Sound (High) Lighthouse

The Hoy Sound (High) is located on the northeast point of the isle of Graemsay in the Orkney Isles. The coordinate of this lighthouse is N. Lat. 58° 56' 09" and W. Long. 3° 16' 33". It is a tapering circular section masonry tower, 108 ft (33.9m) high with balcony supported on Gothic-arched corbels. The flat-roofed keepers’ houses are of Stevenson’s classic Egyptian pattern. The High's light characteristic is white and red occulting light every 8 seconds. It has 33 metres elevation and 19 nautical miles range.

== Hoy Sound (Low) ==
Hoy Sound (Low) Lighthouse

Hoy Sound Low Lighthouse was made automatic in 1966 and is monitored remotely from NLB HQ in Edinburgh. It has 17 metres elevation and 12 nautical miles range.
