= Burn of Ayreland =

Coastal stream on Mainland Orkney, Scotland

Coordinates: 58°58′N 3°13′W

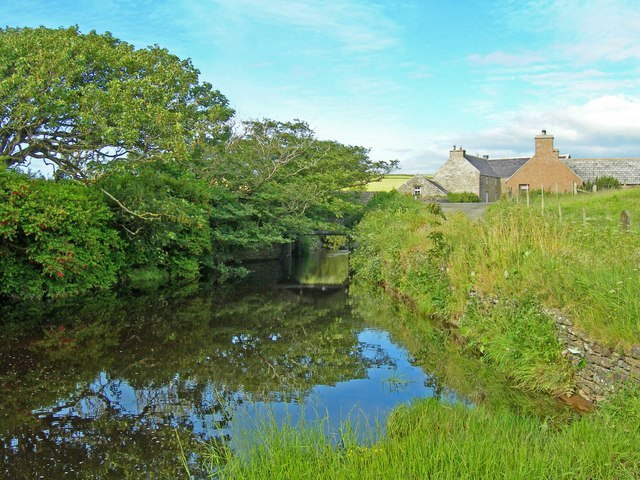
Burn of Ayreland at the Mill of Ireland (Ayreland)

The Burn of Ayreland (or Ireland) is a northwesterly flowing coastal stream on Mainland Orkney, Scotland. It discharges to the Clestrain Sound, about two miles south of Stenness. Draining chiefly agricultural lands elevated mosses and moorland, this stream has a notable lack of turbidity and a pH level of approximately 8. Armouring of the stream bottom consists of pebbles, cobbles and occasional boulders.

== Prehistory and history ==
This burn is located a few miles south of very significant Neolithic and Iron Age archaeological sites. A few miles to the north are the Standing Stones of Stenness and the Ring of Brodgar. About three miles to the northeast is the Neolithic Maes Howe site.

== See also ==
- Midmoss
- Waulkmill Bay
