= Hoy Sound =

Sound in Orkney islands, Scotland

Coordinates: 58°57′N 3°20′W

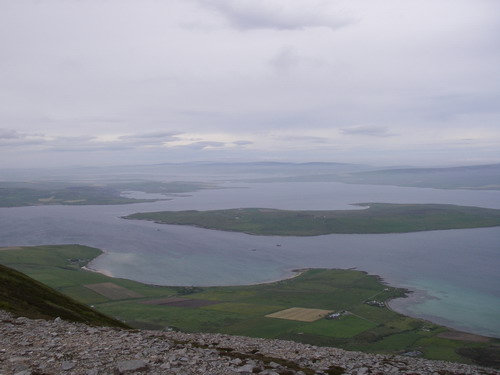
View from Ward Hill, Hoy. Burra Sound and Graemsay are in the foreground, and Hoy Sound at left. Stromness harbour and Loch of Stenness are visible in the distance

Hoy Sound is a body of salt water subject to tidal currents situated south of the town of Stromness in the Orkney archipelago of Scotland.

The sound lies north of the island of Hoy and to the south of Mainland Orkney. To the west are the open waters of the Atlantic Ocean and the natural harbour of Scapa Flow is to the east. Hoy Sound connects to Scapa Flow via Burra Sound to the south of the island of Graemsay and Clestrain Sound to this island's north. The Bay of Ireland north of Hoy Sound communicates with Loch of Stenness and Loch of Harray.
