= Sandwick, Orkney =

Parish on Orkney

Coordinates: 59°3′20″N 3°17′40″W

Sandwick
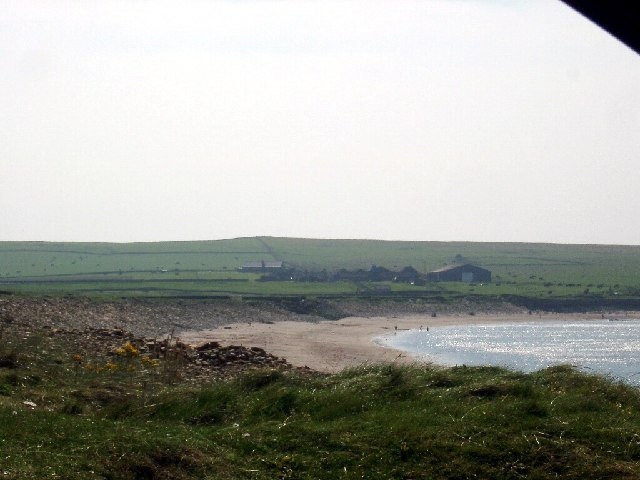
- The Bay of Skaill, which gives the parish its name

- Location within Orkney
- Civil parish: Sandwick
- Council area: Orkney Islands
- Country: Scotland
- Sovereign state: United Kingdom
- Police: Scotland
- Fire: Scottish
- Ambulance: Scottish

Sandwick (Old Norse: Sandvík; Norn: Sandvik) is a parish on the west coast of Mainland, Orkney, Scotland, 4 miles (6.4 km) north of Stromness.

The parish's name derives from the Old Norse Sandvík meaning "Sand Bay".

The coast, except at the small sandy bay (whence the parish's name) consists of cavernous cliffs, from 100 to 200 ft, and includes a lofty natural arch called the hole of Rowe, and is much flanked by insulated pillar-rocks.

The interior is much diversified, and comprises both a large aggregate of flat arable land, and a considerable extent of hilly ground, partly more than 300 ft high.

The chief residence is Skaill House, and chief antiquities include numerous tumuli, a vitrified cairn, a remarkable cromlech, a remnant of a very large stone circle, five Norse forts, and the ruins of Sunsgar castle. Notably, Skara Brae and Yesnaby are in this parish. Sandwick is the biggest parish in Orkney.

Farming plays a large role in the parish. Many of Orkney's biggest and most successful farms are in the parish of Sandwick, where the land is very green and fertile. Sandwick only has two dairy farms left; in the 1970s there were over 25 in the parish. All other farms are mixed beef arable.

The small township of Quoyloo is in Sandwick and has a shop, general store, post office, and a garage run by Isbister Brothers Ltd, founded in the parish in 1929.

The Sandwick Community Association run the Sandwick hall on behalf of the parish.

== St Peter's Kirk ==
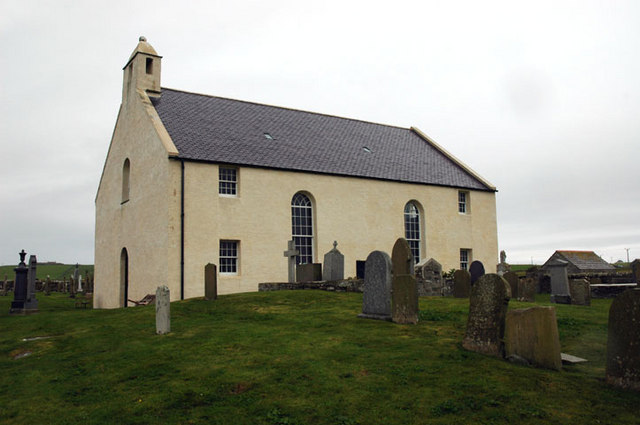
St Peter's Kirk, Sandwick.

St Peter's Kirk (also known as Skaill Kirk) is a rare surviving example of an unaltered Church of Scotland Parish Kirk of 1836. Designated a Category A listed building by Historic Environment Scotland, the current kirk is built partly on the foundations of its predecessor built in 1670. The dedication to St Peter has probably been given to all previous chapels on the site.

Situated on an exposed site near the Bay of Skaill, it is a large harled church, with two tall windows in the centre, a bellcote and a slate roof; the interior evokes the experience of Presbyterian worship in the 19th century when over 500 people attended the church. It was acquired by the Scottish Redundant Churches Trust in 1998 and restored between 2002 and 2003. It is widely used for funerals and weddings by the people of the parish, although it has no electricity or heating installed.
