= Happy Valley (garden) =

Garden in Stenness, Orkney islands, Scotland

Coordinates: 58°58′38″N 3°10′0″W

Happy Valley is a garden created by Edwin Harrold in Stenness, Orkney, Scotland.

== History ==
The site, which includes a house, was originally known as "Bankburn". Bankburn was built in the late 19th century for the Laird of Bigswell, William Isbister and his wife Jane Bewes. The Bigswell properties were one of only three properties in Orkney that have a lineage that can be traced directly back to the 15th century (J. Storer Clouston). They are now divided as a result of crofting reform and forced sales but Bankburn was not formally designated a croft and the landlords were not forced to sell. The properties were clearly of more historical importance than monetary value and Bankburn now represents all that is left of the Bigswell estate that is not in private hands.

The garden was created from a bare hillside by Edwin Harrold, between October 1948 and the 1990s. Edwin Harald lived in Bankburn, rent free, without the knowledge of either the owners or the Crofting Commission. This was clearly illegal but is not a very fashionable part of the story. During Edwin's time in Bankburn he planted and wired the property and it became known as Happy Valley. Harrold had to give up the garden, as he was too old to maintain it, and he died in 2005. Amongst his aims, was to create a wooded area on Orkney, as trees are highly unusual on the archipelago.

In 2004, the local council, Orkney Islands Council, took ownership of the site from the owner, Professor William H. Isbister. A group was formed in 2007 called "Friends of Happy Valley"; they are a group of volunteers who meet together not only to discuss the future of the gardens, but also to work on maintaining the garden. The Council Special Projects Department assisted by maintaining some of the paths and steps, and in April 2008 volunteers planted 700 new trees to add to the existing woodland. It is designated a local nature reserve.

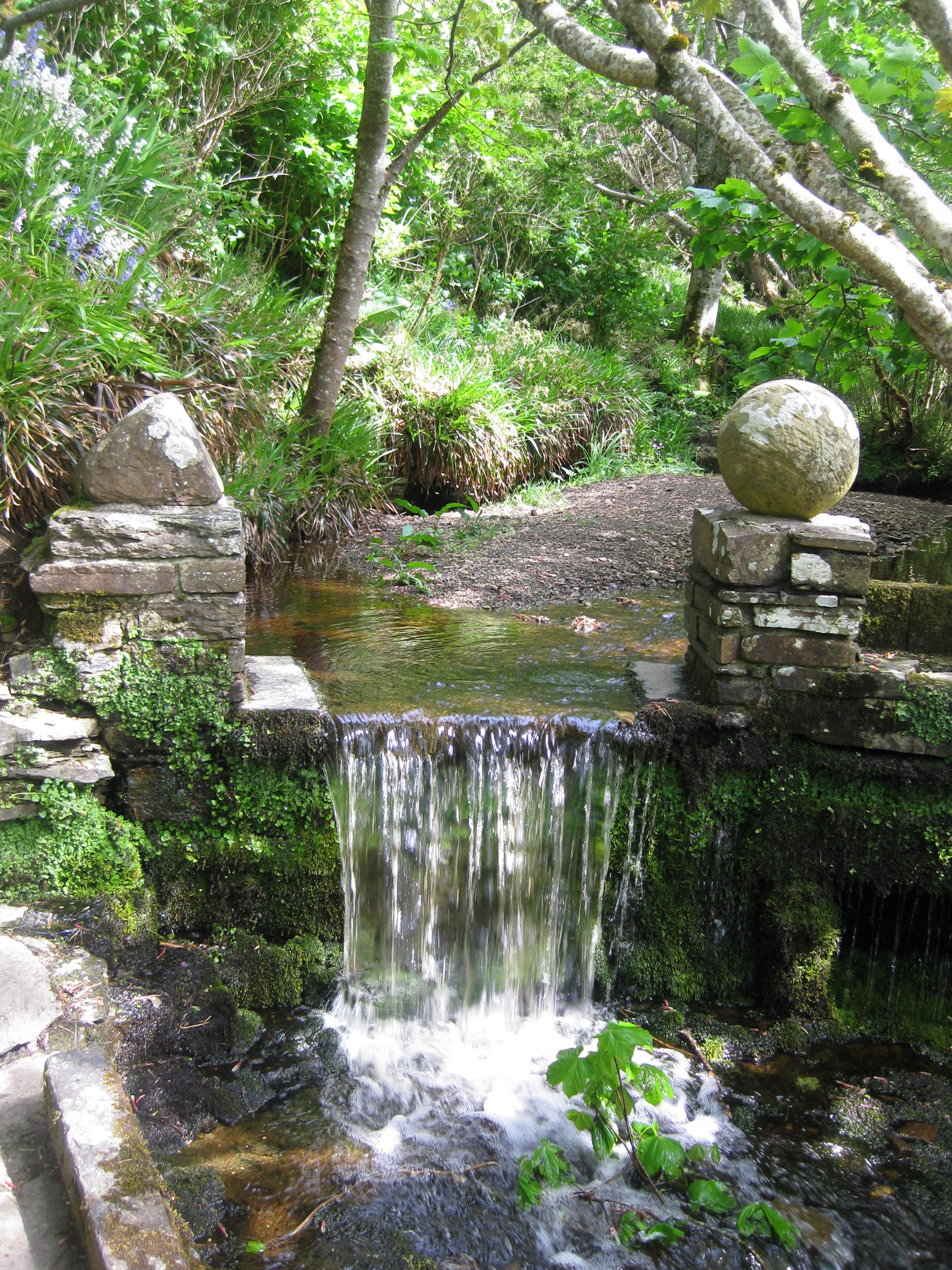
One of the waterfalls created by Edwin Harrold in Happy Valley
