= Skaill House =

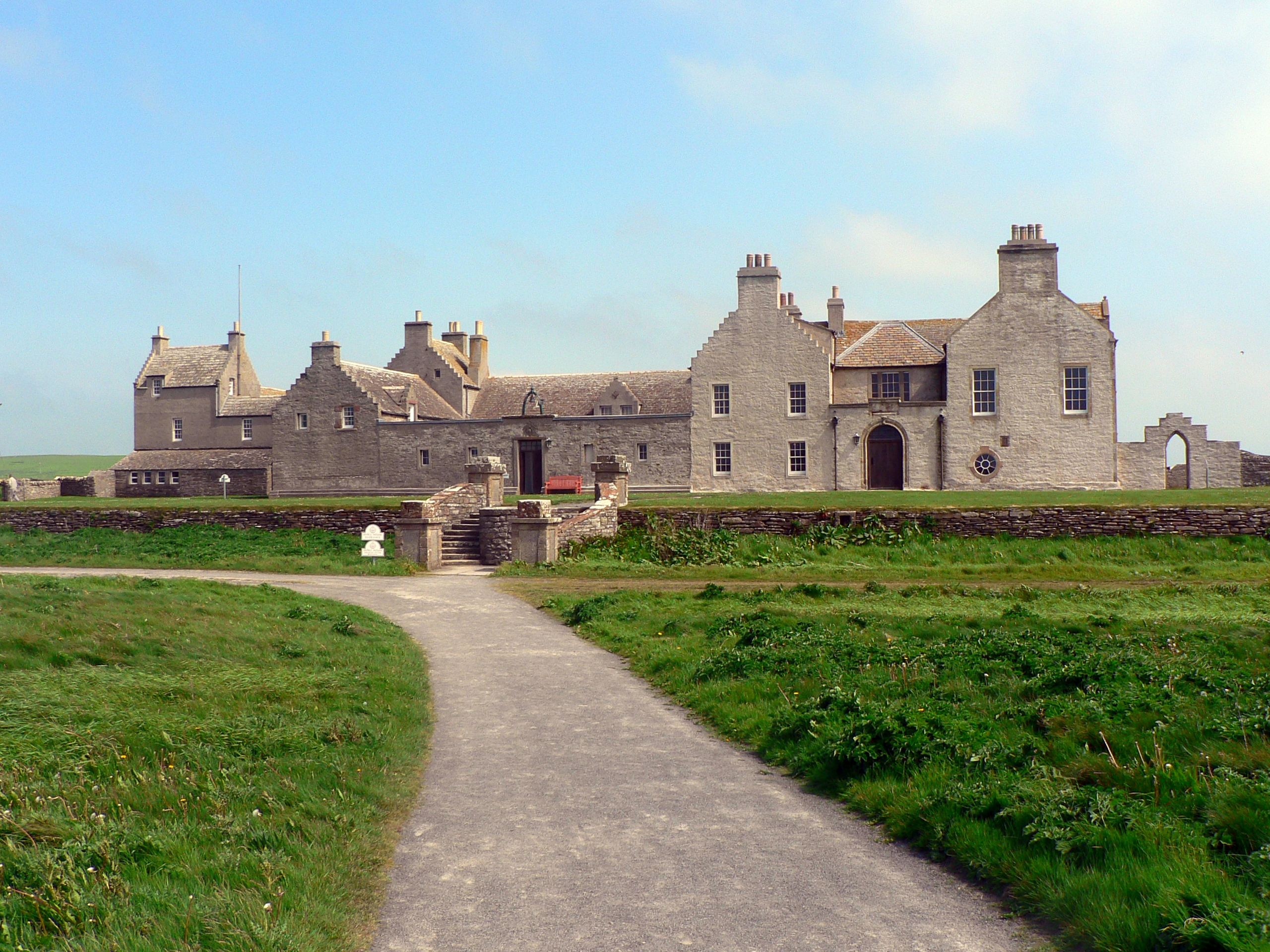
- Skaill House

- Location within Orkney Islands Location within Scotland

General information
- Type: Manor House
- Location: Sandwick, Orkney, Scotland
- Coordinates: 59°2′51.5″N 3°20′11.6″W
- Inaugurated: 1620
- Owner: Katie Waugh daughter of Major Malcolm Macrae, 12th Laird of Breckness

Technical details
- Floor count: 2–3

Website
- www.skaillhouse.co.uk

Inventory of Gardens and Designed Landscapes in Scotland
- Official name: Skaill House
- Designated: 31 March 2003
- Reference no.: GDL00341

Skaill House is a historic manor house in Sandwick parish on Mainland, the largest of the Orkney Islands, Scotland. The house overlooks the Neolithic site, Skara Brae, and the Bay of Skaill.

In 1971, the house was designated as a Category A listed building in Scotland.

== History- ==
Skaill House is situated near to the site of Skara Brae, and the lands were in use from Neolithic times. Various finds from the Bronze- and Iron Ages show continuing use. The name Skaill derives from the Old Norse word for "hall". The names of all the surrounding farms are also derived from that language, and it is presumed that the lands have been permanently settled for over a thousand years.

After the execution of Patrick Stewart, 2nd Earl of Orkney for treason in 1615, the lands were given to the Bishop of Orkney. In 1620, Bishop George Graham constructed a simple manor house, the first part of what is now Skaill House. His son became the laird of the estate, and the property was from that time passed down to succeeding lairds.

Over the years, the building was expanded. In 1997, after six years of restoration work, Skaill House was opened to the public. It can be rented as a holiday home or for receptions and events.

== Description ==
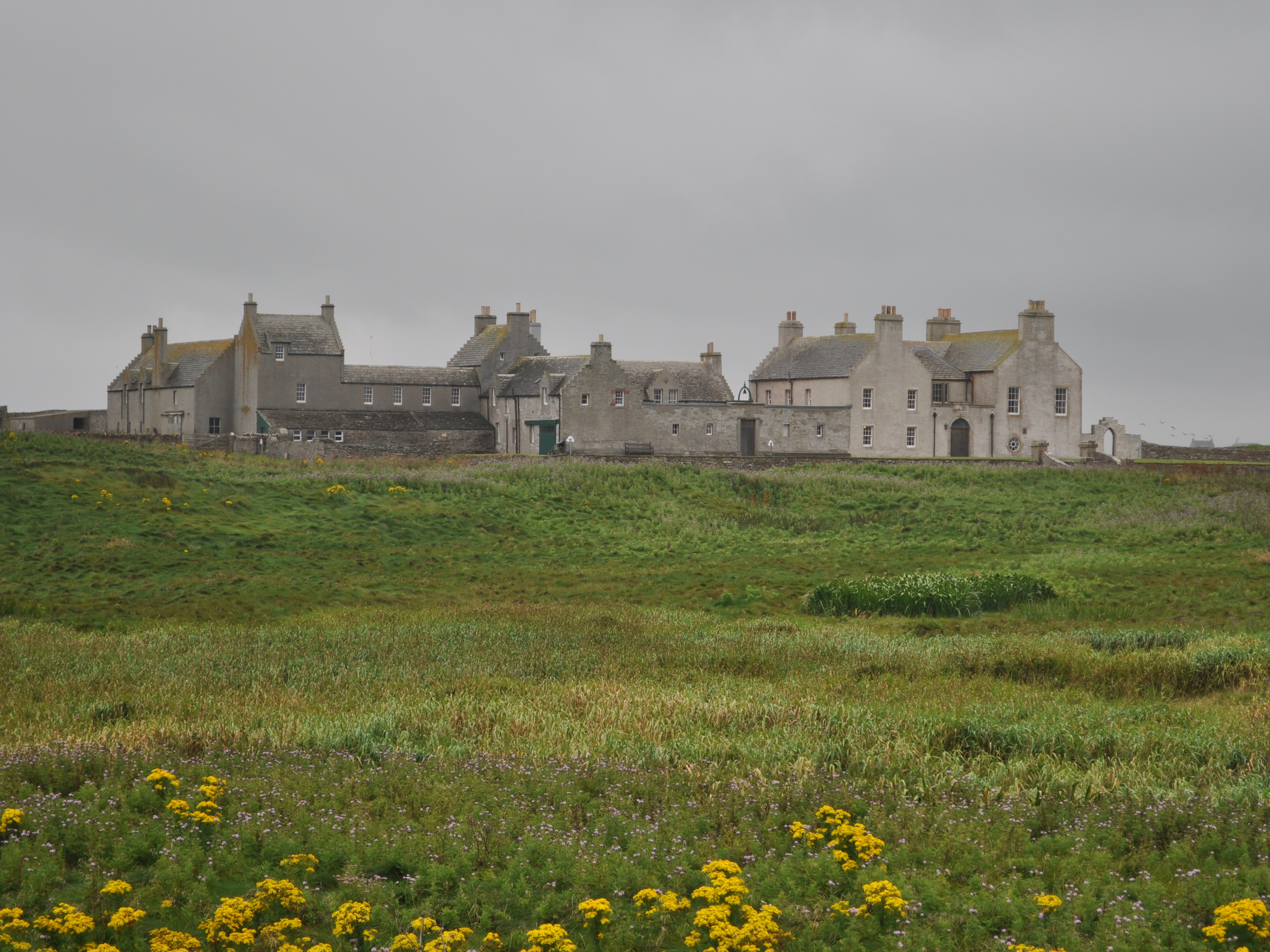
Skaill House, Orkney

Skaill House is situated near the west coast of Mainland overlooking the Bay of Skaill and Skara Brae, and close to St Peter's Kirk. It is described by Historic Environment Scotland as the "most complete 17th century country mansion in Orkney".

The oldest parts of the building surrounded three sides of a central courtyard, and were constructed in the early 17th century. The building is predominantly two storeys, with some three storey sections, and is rendered with harl. Parts of the gables are crow-stepped.

There is a stableyard with a brewhouse and harness room, to the north of the main buildings, and a dovecote dating to the 18th century beside the house. The south wing is partially built on an old, pre-Viking burial ground, thought to be Pictish.
