= Loch of Boardhouse =

- Boardhouse loch
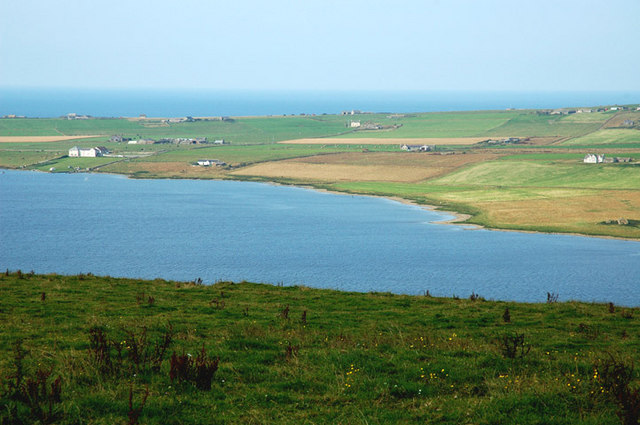
- Boardhouse Loch viewed from Ravie Hill

- Location within Orkney Islands
- Coordinates: 59°6′42″N 3°16′35″W
- Type: Freshwater loch
- Primary inflows: Burn of Kirbuster
- Primary outflows: Burn of Boardhouse
- Basin countries: Scotland
- Max. length: 2 mi (3.2 km)
- Max. width: 0.66 mi (1.06 km)
- Surface area: 1 mi^{2} (2.6 km^{2})
- Average depth: 2 m (6.6 ft)
- Max. depth: 3.2 m (10 ft)
- Water volume: 150,000,000 ft^{3} (4,200,000 m^{3})
- Surface elevation: 15 m (49 ft)

The Loch of Boardhouse is a freshwater loch in the parish of Birsay in the north west of the mainland of Orkney, Scotland. It acts as a reservoir for public water supply and is popular for trout fishing. Nearby are the Loch of Hundland and the Loch of Swannay.

The loch was surveyed in 1906 by Sir John Murray and later charted as part of the Bathymetrical Survey of Fresh-Water Lochs of Scotland 1897-1909.

On 2nd August 2016, brothers Andrew Crawford Livingstone (known as Andy) and Stanley Boyd Livingstone (known as Boyd) from the nearby village of Dounby went missing after going fishing on the loch. A search began on 3rd August 2016. Andy was found the same day. Boyd remained missing until 14th August 2016. Both post mortems reported deaths as a result of drowning. Boyd's ashes were scattered at his favourite fishing spot, just off the coast of Hoy, Orkney. Andy's son, Adam, prevented the family from claiming his remains.
