= Hoglinns Water =

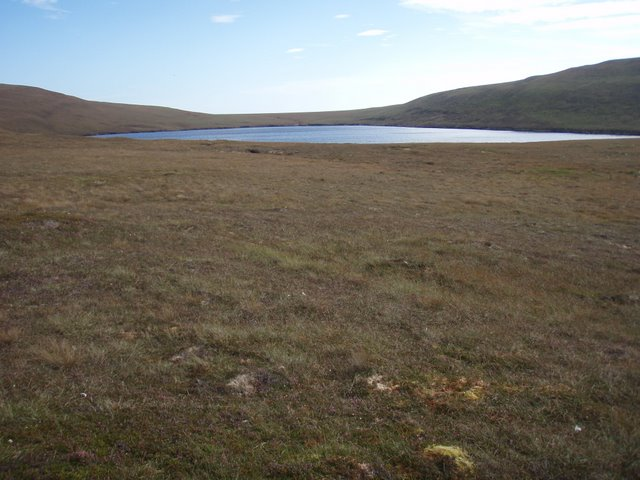

- Location within Orkney Islands
- Location: Hoy, Orkney, Scotland
- Coordinates: 58°48′08″N 3°18′01″W
- Type: Freshwater loch
- Primary outflows: Hoglinns Burn
- Basin countries: Scotland
- Max. length: 0.33 mi (0.53 km)
- Max. width: 0.2 mi (0.32 km)
- Surface area: 63 ha (0.24 mi^{2})
- Average depth: 26 ft (7.9 m)
- Max. depth: 57 ft (17 m)
- Water volume: 44,000,000 ft^{3} (1,200,000 m^{3})
- Shore length^{1}: 1.6 km (0.99 mi)
- Surface elevation: 98 m (322 ft)
- ^{1} Shore length is not a well-defined measure.

Hoglinns Water is a small freshwater loch in the south of the island of Hoy, Orkney. It drains in to Heldale Water via Hoglinns Burn. The loch was surveyed in 1906 by Sir John Murray and later charted as part of the Bathymetrical Survey of Fresh-Water Lochs of Scotland 1897-1909.
