= Loch of Hundland =

- Hundland loch
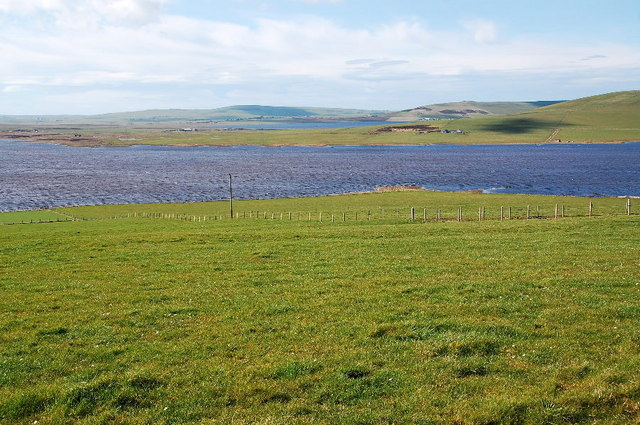
- Loch of Hundland looking south west over pasture towards the loch. The water in the distance is the Loch of Boardhouse.

- Location within Orkney Islands
- Coordinates: 59°6′58″N 3°14′3″W
- Type: Freshwater loch
- Primary outflows: Burn of Kirbuster
- Basin countries: Scotland
- Max. length: 1.3 mi (2.1 km)
- Max. width: 0.5 mi (0.80 km)
- Surface area: 100.8 ha (0.389 sq mi)
- Average depth: 4 ft (1.2 m)
- Max. depth: 7 ft (2.1 m)
- Water volume: 51,000,000 ft^{3} (1,400,000 m^{3})
- Surface elevation: 25 m (82 ft)
- Islands: 6 islets

The Loch of Hundland is a shallow freshwater loch in the parish of Birsay in the north west of the mainland of Orkney, Scotland. The loch lies between the larger lochs of Swannay and Boardhouse and acts as the main water catchment for Loch of Boardhouse. It has a great variety of aquatic plants including species that are unusual locally and nationally, and many types of birds including waders, gulls, larks and ducks that nest or use the loch. It is also popular for trout fishing.

The loch was surveyed in 1906 by James Murray and later charted as part of the Bathymetrical Survey of Fresh-Water Lochs of Scotland 1897-1909.

== Climate ==
Climate data for Orkney: Loch of Hundland, Elevation: 28 m (92 ft), 1991–2020 normals
Month	Jan	Feb	Mar	Apr	May	Jun	Jul	Aug	Sep	Oct	Nov	Dec	Year
Record high °C (°F)	13.3 (55.9)	15.7 (60.3)	19.4 (66.9)	21.1 (70.0)	24.6 (76.3)	26.0 (78.8)	26.6 (79.9)	26.5 (79.7)	25.4 (77.7)	18.2 (64.8)	15.3 (59.5)	14.5 (58.1)	26.6 (79.9)
Mean daily maximum °C (°F)	6.6 (43.9)	6.8 (44.2)	8.0 (46.4)	10.2 (50.4)	12.8 (55.0)	14.6 (58.3)	16.6 (61.9)	16.5 (61.7)	14.5 (58.1)	11.6 (52.9)	8.9 (48.0)	7.0 (44.6)	11.2 (52.2)
Daily mean °C (°F)	4.2 (39.6)	4.1 (39.4)	5.1 (41.2)	7.0 (44.6)	9.1 (48.4)	11.3 (52.3)	13.3 (55.9)	13.3 (55.9)	11.7 (53.1)	8.9 (48.0)	6.4 (43.5)	4.5 (40.1)	8.3 (46.9)
Mean daily minimum °C (°F)	1.8 (35.2)	1.5 (34.7)	2.3 (36.1)	3.7 (38.7)	5.5 (41.9)	8.0 (46.4)	10.1 (50.2)	10.1 (50.2)	8.8 (47.8)	6.3 (43.3)	3.9 (39.0)	2.0 (35.6)	5.4 (41.7)
Record low °C (°F)	−8.5 (16.7)	−10.0 (14.0)	−8.8 (16.2)	−5.2 (22.6)	−4.5 (23.9)	−0.4 (31.3)	1.8 (35.2)	0.3 (32.5)	−0.5 (31.1)	−2.1 (28.2)	−6.5 (20.3)	−10.8 (12.6)	−10.8 (12.6)
Average precipitation mm (inches)	121.6 (4.79)	91.8 (3.61)	85.4 (3.36)	61.4 (2.42)	54.2 (2.13)	53.0 (2.09)	59.5 (2.34)	70.6 (2.78)	92.2 (3.63)	122.5 (4.82)	127.6 (5.02)	116.2 (4.57)	1,056 (41.57)
Average precipitation days (≥ 1.0 mm)	20.5	17.8	17.4	13.7	11.8	11.2	11.8	12.9	15.0	19.5	21.7	21.6	194.9
Mean monthly sunshine hours	27.4	58.4	97.4	147.8	199.7	146.9	137.9	135.6	97.2	71.5	37.5	21.3	1,178.5
Source 1: Met Office
Source 2: Starlings Roost Weather
