= Loch of Kirbister =

Loch in Orkney, Scotland

- Kirbister loch, Loch of Orphir
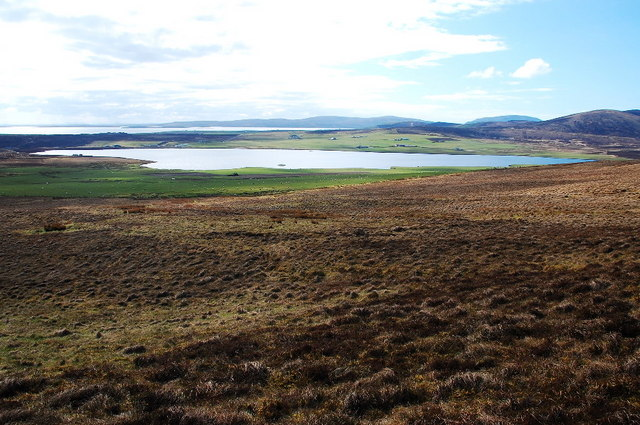
- Looking roughly SW over moorland down to the loch.

- Location within Orkney Islands
- Location: Mainland Orkney, Scotland
- Coordinates: 58°57′08″N 3°5′36″W
- Type: freshwater loch
- Primary inflows: several burns
- Primary outflows: Mill burn at south end in to Waulkmill Bay
- Catchment area: 8 mi^{2} (21 km^{2})
- Basin countries: Scotland
- Max. length: 1.25 mi (2.01 km)
- Max. width: 0.5 mi (0.80 km)
- Surface area: 227 acres (0.92 km^{2})
- Average depth: 4 ft (1.2 m)
- Max. depth: 6 ft (1.8 m)
- Water volume: 41,000,000 ft^{3} (1,200,000 m^{3})
- Surface elevation: 52 ft (16 m)
- Islands: Holm of Groundwater

The Loch of Kirbister is a small, shallow, somewhat triangular-shaped loch located on Mainland Orkney, Scotland, in the parish of Orphir. It lies 5 mi (8.0 km) southwest of Kirkwall on a cultivated land between two hills. There is a small turf-covered islet known as the Groundwater of Holm just off the eastern shore of the loch. It measures 37 m (121 ft) by 19 m (62 ft) and exhibits stone traces of an oval structure and a small projecting pier. The loch is a popular spot for trout fishing. Located on the lodge of the loch is the Orkney Trout Fishing Association which operates a hatchery at the Kirbister pumphouse.

Mill Burn, the southern outflow from the loch, was used to power the 18th-century Kirbister Mill.

The loch was surveyed in 1903 by T.N. Johnston and R.C. Marshall and later charted as part of Sir John Murray's The Bathymetrical Survey of Fresh-Water Lochs of Scotland 1897-1909.
