= Loch of Tankerness =

- Tankerness loch
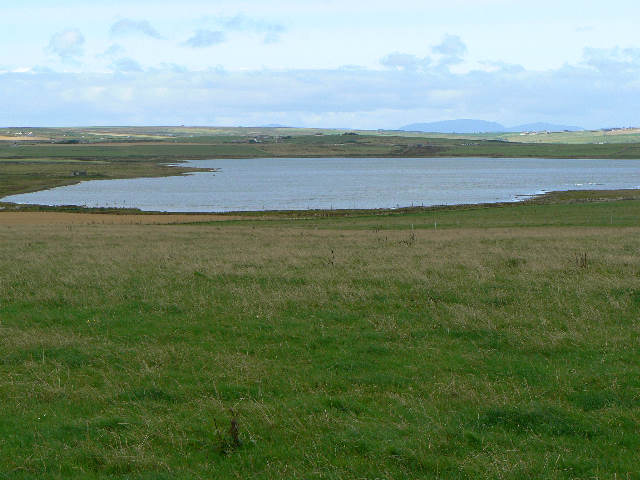
- Loch of Tankerness

- Location within Orkney Islands
- Location: Mainland Orkney, Scotland
- Coordinates: 58°58′6″N 2°50′37″W
- Type: freshwater loch
- Primary outflows: Mill Burn
- Basin countries: Scotland
- Max. length: 1 mi (1.6 km)
- Max. width: 0.5 mi (0.80 km)
- Surface area: 64.1 ha (158 acres)
- Average depth: 4.5 ft (1.4 m)
- Max. depth: 7 ft (2.1 m)
- Water volume: 28,000,000 ft^{3} (790,000 m^{3})
- Shore length^{1}: 3.9 km (2.4 mi)
- Surface elevation: 8 m (26 ft)
- Islands: 0
- ^{1} Shore length is not a well-defined measure.

Loch of Tankerness is a large, lowland, freshwater loch on the Orkney mainland in Scotland. The loch is roughly triangular in shape and is shallow with a flat bottom that gradually deepens from west to east. It lies approximately 4 mi (6.4 km) southeast of Kirkwall.

== Archaeology and history ==
The remains of a broch stand on a short promontory on the southwest shore. It is thought that the broch is the Howie of the Manse.

At the edge of the loch, on the eastern shore, is a burnt mound. Beside the mound is a Bronze Age structure that is presumed to be a house. It is in the form of erect slabs and a slab floor, forming an oval plan. When the loch's water level dropped during the drought of 1980, the house was further exposed and recorded. At that time archaeological artefacts were retrieved from the loch including the point of an early plough.

On the eastern shore is a filter room and pump house. It was originally built in the late 19th century and powered by an oil engine. The engine was replaced in the 1940s with a windpump.

== Wildlife ==
The Greenland white-fronted goose is occasionally seen on the loch. In 1960s 50-100 geese were regularly found there in the winter but there has been a sharp decline in numbers since 1974/75 probably as a result of reclamation of moorland and an increase in shooting in the area. The decline at this site matches an increase in the size of the wintering flock on Stronsay.

== Survey ==
The loch was surveyed in 1903 by R.C. Marshall and later charted as part of the Sir John Murray's Bathymetrical Survey of Fresh-Water Lochs of Scotland 1897-1909.
