= Pettinain =

Coordinates: 55°40′09″N 3°39′49″W

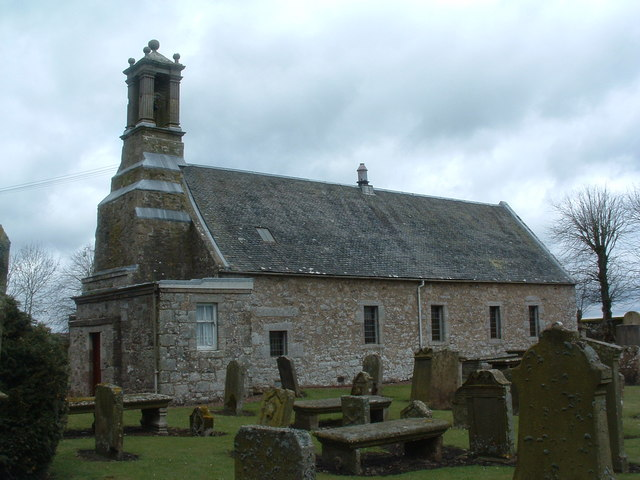
- Pettinain Church

- Location within South Lanarkshire
- OS grid reference: NS953426
- Council area: South Lanarkshire
- Lieutenancy area: Lanarkshire
- Country: Scotland
- Sovereign state: United Kingdom
- Post town: LANARK
- Postcode district: ML11
- Police: Scotland
- Fire: Scottish
- Ambulance: Scottish
- UK Parliament: Dumfriesshire, Clydesdale and Tweeddale
- Scottish Parliament: Clydesdale

Pettinain is a hamlet and civil parish in South Lanarkshire, Scotland, 7 miles (11 km) east of Lanark. Bartholomew's Gazetteer of the British Isles described Pettinain in 1887 as "par. and vil., Lanarkshire, on river Clyde - par., 3900 ac., pop. 360; vil., 3 miles S. of Carstairs Junction; P.O".

== Notable residents ==
- Claudia Beamish, Scottish Labour Party MSP
