= Loch of Swannay =

- Swannay loch
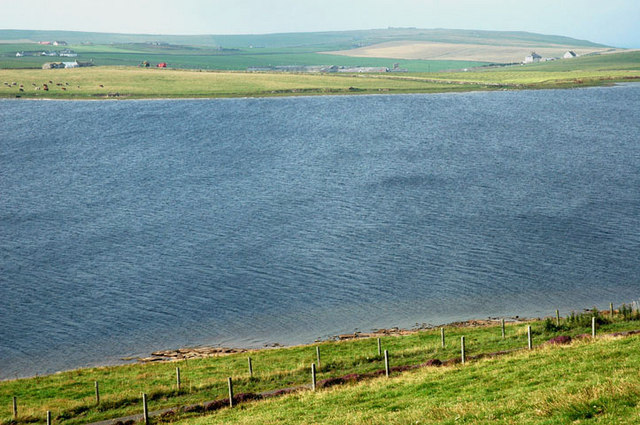
- Swannay Loch looking towards Swannay. Swannay Farm in right far distance

- Location within Orkney Islands
- Coordinates: 59°8′3″N 3°12′19″W
- Type: Freshwater loch
- Primary outflows: Swannay burn
- Basin countries: Scotland
- Max. length: 2 mi (3.2 km)
- Max. width: 0.66 mi (1.06 km)
- Surface area: 233.4 ha (0.901 sq mi)
- Average depth: 12 ft (3.7 m)
- Max. depth: 9.25 ft (2.82 m)
- Water volume: 51,000,000 ft^{3} (1,400,000 m^{3})
- Surface elevation: 43 m (141 ft)
- Islands: 3 islets

The Loch of Swannay is the most northerly loch on the mainland of Orkney and lies within the parish of Birsay in the north west of the island. It is an elliptically shaped, freshwater loch and is close to the lochs of Hundland and Boardhouse. The grassland at the shore of the loch is the main feeding area for a wintering flock of rare Greenland white-fronted geese and the rare flat-stalked pondweed is found in the waters. Many varieties of birds use and nest in the loch including mute swans, skylarks, meadow pipits, twites, gulls and sedge warblers. It is also popular for trout fishing.

The loch was surveyed in 1906 by James Murray and later charted as part of the Bathymetrical Survey of Fresh-Water Lochs of Scotland 1897-1909.
