= Loch of Stenness =

- Stenness loch
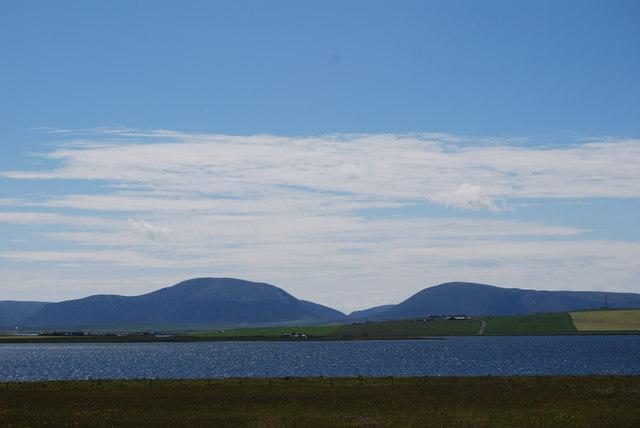
- Looking over the Loch of Stenness towards Hoy

- Location within Orkney Islands
- Location: Orkney, Scotland
- Coordinates: 59°00′N 3°15′W
- Type: brackish loch
- Basin countries: Scotland
- Max. length: 4 mi (6.4 km)
- Max. width: 1.5 mi (2.4 km)
- Surface area: 2.5 mi^{2} (6.5 km^{2})
- Average depth: 10.5 ft (3.2 m)
- Max. depth: 17 ft (5.2 m)
- Water volume: 716,000,000 ft^{3} (0.0203 km^{3})
- Surface elevation: 3.6 ft (1.1 m)

The Loch of Stenness is a large brackish loch on Mainland, Orkney, Scotland and is named for the parish of Stenness. It is 2 miles (3.2 kilometres) northeast of the town of Stromness, lies immediately to the south of the Loch of Harray and is close to the World Heritage neolithic sites of the Stones of Stenness and Ring of Brodgar. In Old Norse its name was Steinnesvatn.

== Hydrography ==
The Loch of Stenness is a sea loch and is the deepest loch on the Mainland, it is slightly smaller in area and volume than the Loch of Harray. It is located at 3.25 miles (5.23 kilometres) northeast of Stromness, and is the largest brackish lagoon in the UK. Its outflow is into the Bay of Ireland and the Hoy Sound at Brig o' Waithe where tidal currents influence the loch but cause little variation in its level. The loch is connected to the Loch of Harray at the Bridge of Brodgar and both lochs together cover an area of 19.3 square kilometres (7.5 square miles) making the two combined the ninth largest loch in Scotland by area (as listed by Murray and Pullar (1910)). The Loch of Stenness has a maximum depth of 5.2 metres (17 ft) and an average depth of 3.2 metres (10 ft).

== Natural history ==
The Loch of Stenness is important in terms of its biodiversity because of its brackish composition. It has been designated a Site of Special Scientific Interest as well as a Special Area of Conservation. Its varying salt content supports a range of wildlife suited to marine, brackish and fresh water conditions including burrowing worms, bivalves such as mussels and mya arenaria, the snail Hydrobia ulvae and various types of green algae known as charophytes. It provides a wintering ground for a wide variety of wildfowl including pochard, tufted duck, scaup and goldeneye. It has been designated an Important Bird Area (IBA) by BirdLife International because it supports populations of waterbirds.

== Archaeology ==
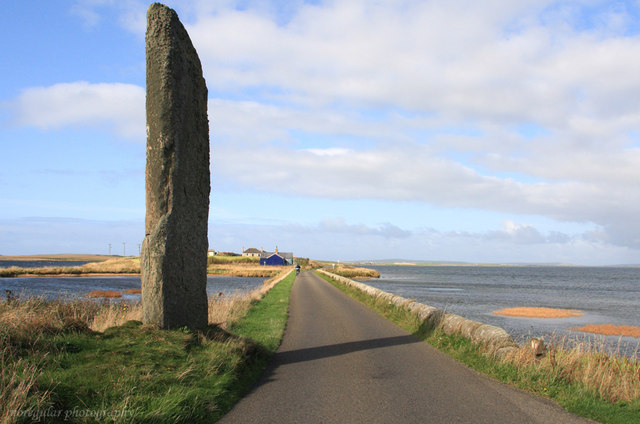
The Watch Stone, Stenness

The Loch of Stenness is adjacent to the World Heritage sites of Ring of Brodgar and the Stones of Stenness. The Watch Stone, a solitary monolith 5.6 m (18 ft) high stands where the loch joins with the Loch of Harray, at Bridge of Brodgar.

The loch and its surrounding area underwent detailed geophysical and multibeam sonar surveys in 2011 and 2012 to investigate the drowned palaeo-landscape. The surveys indicated significant archaeological features in the loch including a circular structure possibly a henge.
