= Waulkmill Bay =

Tidal bay on the Mainland, Orkney, Scotland

Coordinates: 58°56′N 3°04′W

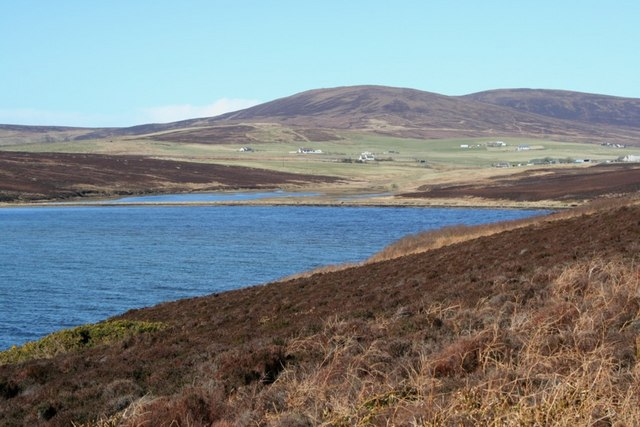
View of Waulkmill Bay

Waulkmill Bay is a tidal bay on the southwest of Mainland Orkney, Scotland. This bay and its immediately surrounding area have been identified as a Site of Special Scientific Interest by Scottish Natural Heritage.

Immediately to the east of Waulkmill Bay is the RSPB site of Hobbister Preserve. The freshwater feed from the Loch of Kirbister and the presence of reformative sand bars make the sandy beach area at the north end of Waulkmill Bay a unique habitat for birds. The salt marsh area associated with Waulkmill Bay is a particularly noted avian habitat.

== See also ==
- Burn of Ayreland
