= Loch of Bosquoy =

- Bosquoy loch
- Location within Orkney Islands
- Location: Orkney, Scotland
- Coordinates: 59°02′52″N 3°12′47″W
- Type: freshwater loch
- Primary outflows: Loch of Harray via a sluice
- Catchment area: 3.25 mi^{2} (8.4 km^{2})
- Basin countries: Scotland
- Max. length: 0.75 mi (1.21 km)
- Max. width: 0.33 mi (0.53 km)
- Surface area: 65 acres (0.26 km^{2})
- Average depth: 2.5 ft (0.76 m)
- Max. depth: 5 ft (1.5 m)
- Water volume: 7,000,000 ft^{3} (200,000 m^{3})
- Surface elevation: 36 ft (11 m)
- Islands: Islets of reeds

The Loch of Bosquoy is a small, shallow, rhomboid shaped loch on Mainland, Orkney, Scotland situated just off the north east corner of the Loch of Harray. The loch was surveyed during 1903 by Sir John Murray and later charted as part of The Bathymetrical Survey of Fresh-Water Lochs of Scotland 1897–1909.
