= Clestrain Sound =

Strait within the Orkney Islands, Scotland

Coordinates: 58°56.5′N 3°15′W

Clestrain Sound is a strait between Mainland Orkney and the Isle of Graemsay within the Orkney Islands, Scotland.

Clestrain Sound lies in the western entrance to Scapa Flow. Like other seaways within the Orkney Islands, Clestrain Sound has been recognized for many years to be warmed by the North Atlantic Drift current.

== See also ==
- Mill of Ayreland
- Burn of Ayreland
