= Skara Brae =

Neolithic archaeological site in Scotland

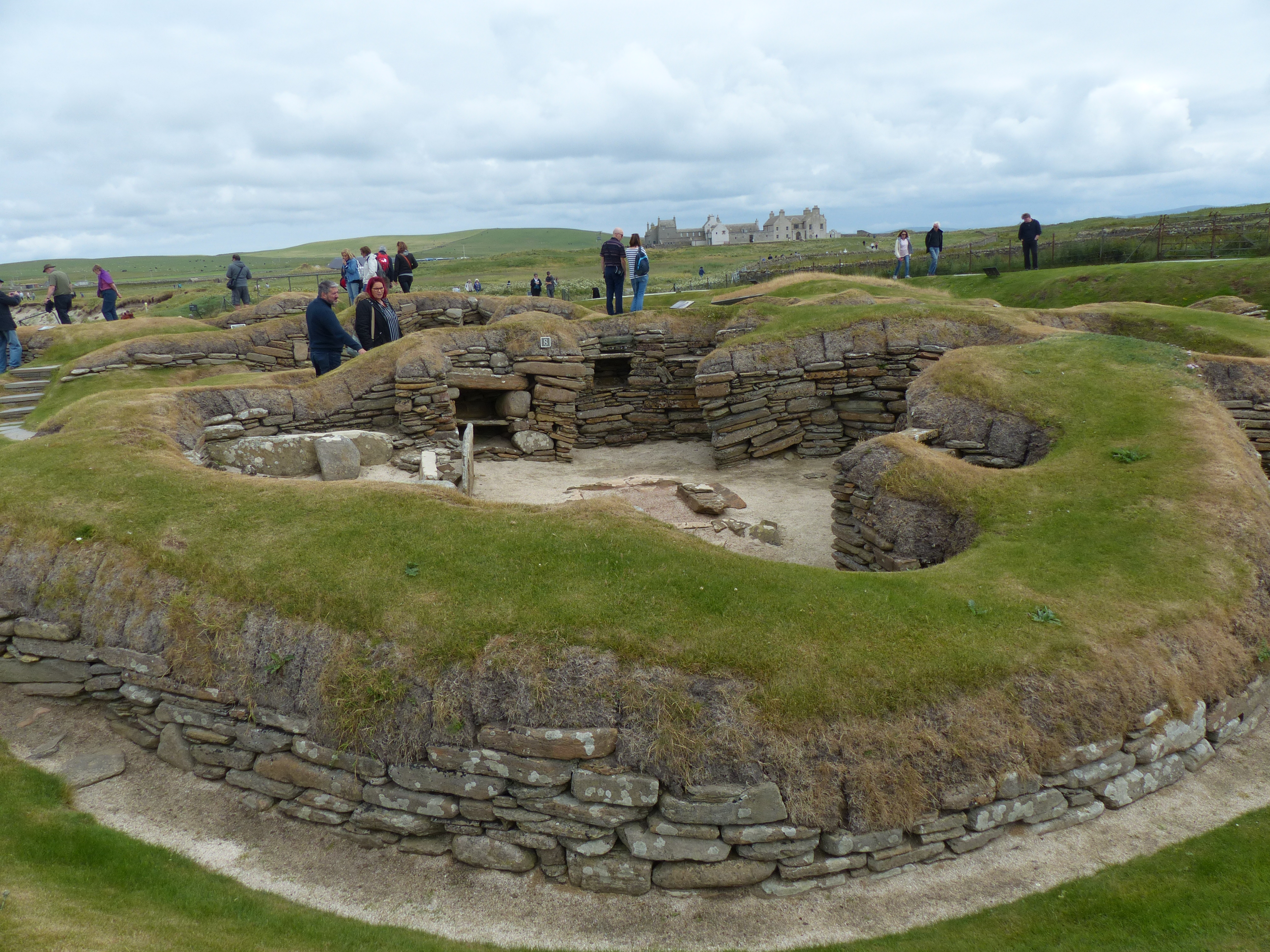
- Skara Brae from the entrance gate

- Location in Scotland
- 59°02′55″N 3°20′30″W
- Type: Settlement
- Periods: Neolithic
- Location: Scotland

History
- Built: c. 3180 BC
- Abandoned: c. 2500 BC

Site notes
- Discovered: 1850
- Owner: Historic Environment Scotland
- Public access: Yes

Identifiers
- HES: SM90276

UNESCO World Heritage Site
- Type: Cultural
- Criteria: i, ii, iii, iv
- Designated: 1999 (23rd session)
- Part of: Heart of Neolithic Orkney
- Reference no.: 514
- Region: Europe

Skara Brae (/ˈskærə ˈbreɪ/) is a stone-built Neolithic settlement located along the Bay of Skaill on the west coast of Mainland, Orkney. The site was discovered following a storm exposing the presence of stone structures within the coastal sand dunes. Today, ten structures and four passageways are visible, as well as the remains of stone furniture and fixtures.

The site was occupied from roughly 3180 BC to around 2500 BC and is Europe's most complete Neolithic village. Skara Brae gained UNESCO World Heritage Site status as one of four sites making up "The Heart of Neolithic Orkney".

Care of the site is the responsibility of Historic Environment Scotland which works with partners in managing the site: Orkney Islands Council, NatureScot (Scottish Natural Heritage), and the Royal Society for the Protection of Birds. Visitors to the site are welcome year-round.

== Name and etymology ==
The modern name Skara Brae reflects the layered linguistic history of Orkney, where elements from Old Norse and Scots frequently appear in place names. The word brae is a Scots term meaning "slope" or "hillside", commonly used in Scotland to describe rising ground or a bank above lower land.

The first element, Skara, derives from earlier recorded forms such as Skerrabra or Styerrabrae, names originally applied to the grassy mound that once covered the buried settlement. Since the archeological site's discovery and excavation, the name has been adopted in referring to the Neolithic village.

== Discovery and early exploration ==
In the winter of 1850, a severe storm hit Scotland, causing widespread damage and over 200 deaths. In the Bay of Skaill, the storm stripped earth from a large irregular knoll. When the storm cleared, local villagers found the outline of a village consisting of several small houses without roofs. William Graham Watt of Skaill House, a son of the local laird who was a self-taught geologist, began an amateur excavation of the site, but after four houses were uncovered, work was abandoned in 1868.

The site remained undisturbed until 1913, when during a single weekend, the site was plundered by a party with shovels who took away an unknown quantity of artefacts. In 1924, another storm swept away part of one of the houses, and it was determined the site should be secured and properly investigated. The job was given to the University of Edinburgh's Professor V. Gordon Childe, who travelled to Skara Brae for the first time in mid-1927.

In 2019, a series of photographs showing Childe and four women at the site of the excavation were re-examined. It had been widely believed that the women were tourists or local women visiting the excavation site, but a note on the back of the photographs identified the women as "4 of [Childe's] lady students", and it seems that they were active participants in the excavation. The women have been tentatively identified as Margaret Simpson (who was acknowledged in Childe's monographs about Skara Brae), Margaret Mitchell, Mary Kennedy, and Margaret Cole.

== Neolithic lifestyle ==
The inhabitants of Skara Brae were makers and users of grooved ware, a distinctive style of pottery that had recently appeared in northern Scotland. Once thought to be an underground settlement, the structures are now understood as free-standing stone houses insulated and stabilised with midden. The buildings follow a similar layout with a central hearth, beds on either side of the hearth, and a dresser opposite the entrance.

Each dwelling was entered through a low doorway with a stone slab door which could be shut "by a bar made of bone that slid in bar-holes cut in the stone door jambs." A series of drains have been built underneath at least five of the houses, although the extent of this system has not been fully mapped.

Seven of the houses have similar furniture, with the beds and dressers in the same places in each house. The dresser stands against the wall opposite the door and is the first thing anyone entering the dwelling sees. Each of these houses had a larger bed on the right side of the doorway and a smaller one on the left. Lloyd Laing noted that this pattern accorded with Hebridean custom up to the early 20th century, suggesting that the husband's bed was the larger and the wife's was the smaller. The discovery of beads and paint pots in some of the smaller beds may support this interpretation. Additional support may come from the recognition that stone boxes are located to the left of most doorways, forcing the person entering the house to turn to the right-hand, "male" side of the dwelling. At the front of each bed lie the stumps of stone pillars that may have supported a canopy of fur, another link with recent Hebridean style.

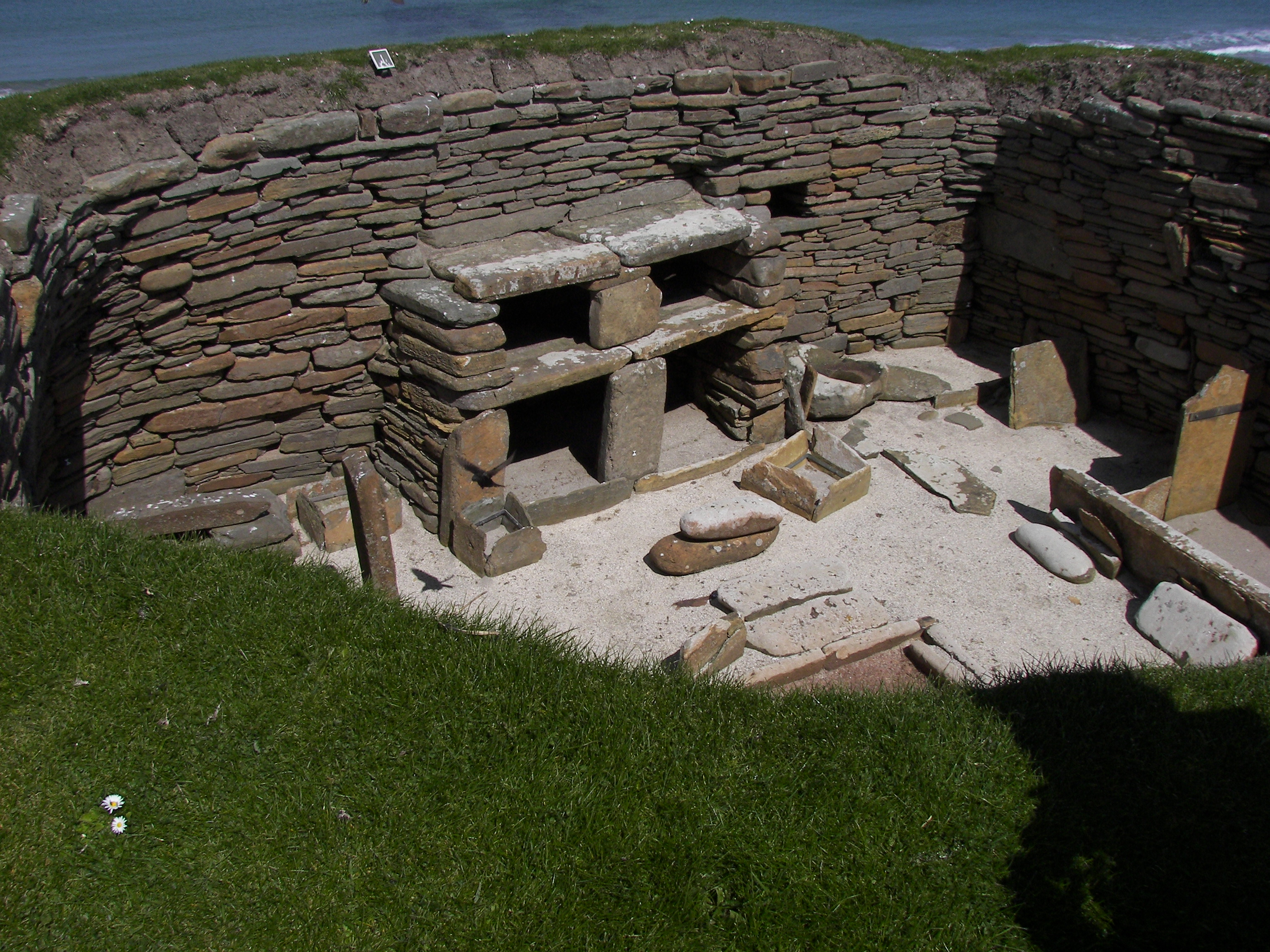
Evidence of home furnishings

House 8 has no storage boxes or dressers and has been divided into something resembling small cubicles. Fragments of stone, bone, and antler were excavated, suggesting House 8 may have been used to make tools such as bone needles or flint axes. The presence of heat-damaged volcanic rocks, and what appears to be a flue, supports this interpretation. House 8 is distinctive in other ways as well: it is a stand-alone structure not surrounded by midden; instead it is above ground with walls over 2 metres (6.6 ft) thick and has a "porch" protecting the entrance.

It is not clear what material the inhabitants burned in their hearths. Childe was sure that the fuel was peat, but a detailed analysis of vegetation patterns and trends suggests climatic conditions conducive to the development of thick beds of peat did not develop in this part of Orkney until after Skara Brae was abandoned. Other possible fuels include driftwood and animal dung. There is evidence that dried seaweed was widely used. At some sites in Orkney, investigators have found a glassy, slag-like material called "kelp" or "cramp" which may be residual burnt seaweed.

The site provided the earliest known record of the human flea (Pulex irritans) in Europe.

The Grooved Ware People who built Skara Brae were primarily pastoralists who raised cattle, pigs, and sheep. Childe originally believed that the inhabitants did not farm, but excavations in 1972 unearthed seed grains from a midden, suggesting that barley was cultivated. Fish bones and shells are common in the midden, indicating that dwellers ate seafood. Limpet shells are common and may have been used as fish bait, kept in stone boxes in the homes. The boxes were formed from thin slabs with joints carefully sealed with clay to render them waterproof.

This pastoral lifestyle stands in sharp contrast to some of the more exotic interpretations of the Skara Brae people's culture. Euan MacKie suggested that Skara Brae might be the home of a privileged theocratic class of wise men who engaged in astronomical and magical ceremonies at nearby Ring of Brodgar and the Standing Stones of Stenness. Graham and Anna Ritchie cast doubt on this interpretation noting there is no archaeological evidence for this claim, although a Neolithic "low road" that goes from Skara Brae passes near both these sites and ends at the chambered tomb of Maeshowe. Low roads connect Neolithic ceremonial sites throughout Britain.

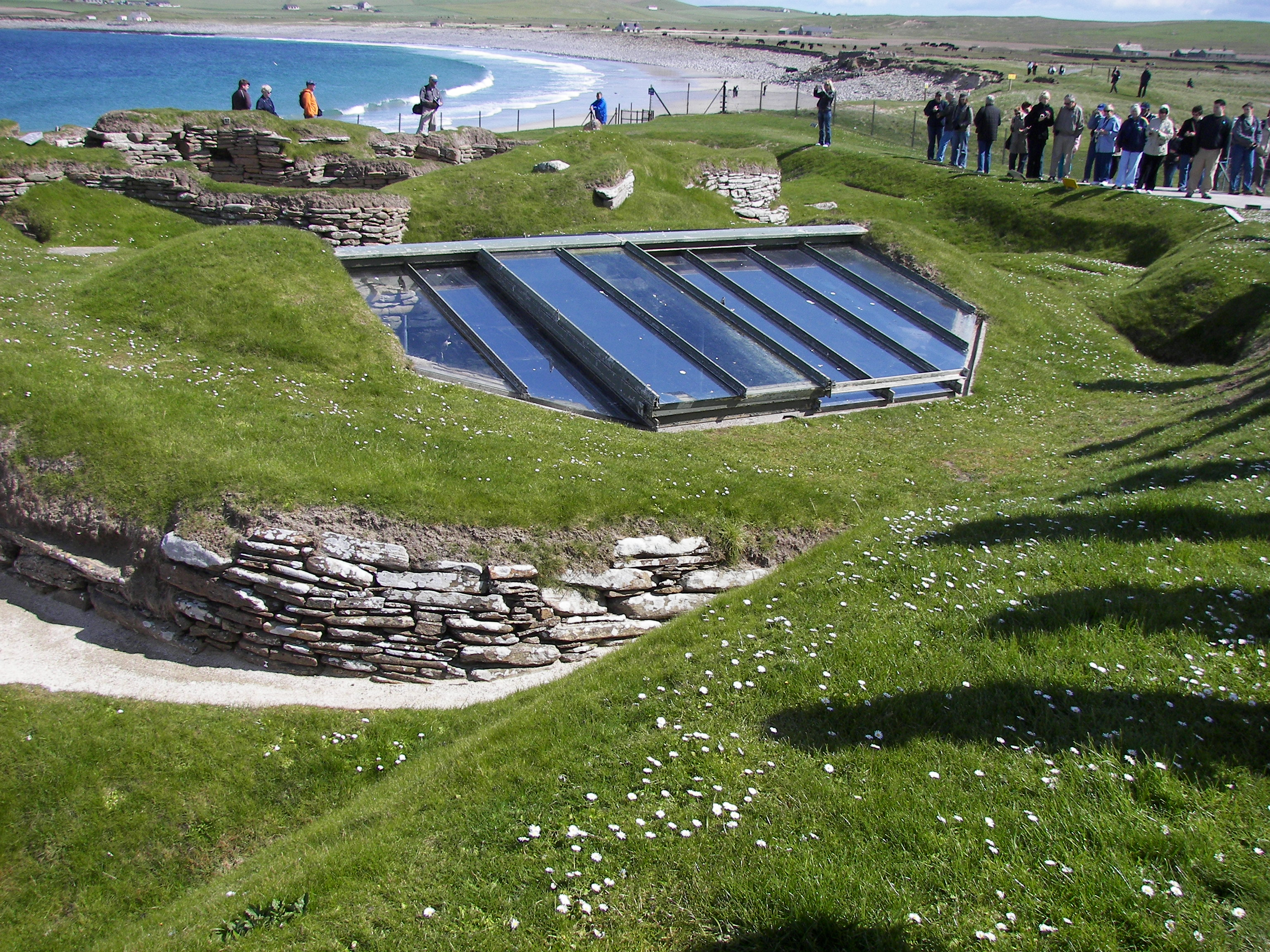
View over the settlement, showing covering to house No. 7 and proximity to modern shore line. The glass roof has now been replaced by a turf one, as the humidity and heat caused by the glass roof were hindering preservation.

== Dating and abandonment ==
Originally, Childe believed that the settlement dated from around 500 BC. This interpretation was coming under increasing challenge by the time new excavations in 1972–73 settled the question. Radiocarbon results obtained from samples collected during these excavations indicate that occupation of Skara Brae began about 3180 BC with occupation continuing for about six hundred years. Around 2500 BC, after the climate changed, becoming much colder and wetter, the settlement may have been abandoned by its inhabitants. There are many theories as to why the people of Skara Brae left; particularly popular interpretations involve a major storm. Evan Hadingham combined evidence from found objects with the storm scenario to imagine a dramatic end to the settlement:

As was the case at Pompeii, the inhabitants seem to have been taken by surprise and fled in haste, for many of their prized possessions, such as necklaces made from animal teeth and bone, or pins of walrus ivory, were left behind. The remains of choice meat joints were discovered in some of the beds, presumably forming part of the villagers' last supper. One woman was in such haste that her necklace broke as she squeezed through the narrow doorway of her home, scattering a stream of beads along the passageway outside as she fled the encroaching sand.

Anna Ritchie strongly disagrees with catastrophic interpretations of the village's abandonment:

A popular myth would have the village abandoned during a massive storm that threatened to bury it in sand instantly, but the truth is that its burial was gradual and that it had already been abandoned – for what reason, no one can tell.

The site was farther from the sea than it is today, and it is possible that Skara Brae was built adjacent to a fresh water lagoon protected by dunes. Although the visible buildings give an impression of an organic whole, an unknown quantity of additional structures may already been lost to sea erosion before the site's rediscovery. Uncovered remains are known to exist immediately adjacent to the ancient monument in areas presently covered by fields, and others, of uncertain date, can be seen eroding out of the cliff edge a little to the south of the enclosed area.

== Artefacts ==
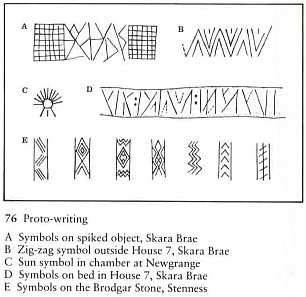
Symbols found at Skara Brae and other Neolithic sites

Enigmatic carved stone balls have been found at the site and some are on display in the museum. Similar objects have been found throughout northern Scotland. The spiral ornamentation on some of these "balls" has been stylistically linked to objects found in the Boyne Valley in Ireland. Similar symbols have been found carved into stone lintels and bed posts. These symbols, sometimes referred to as "runic writings", have been subjected to controversial translations. For example, author Rodney Castleden suggested that "colons" found punctuating vertical and diagonal symbols may represent separations between words.

Lumps of red ochre found here and at other Neolithic sites have been interpreted as evidence that body painting may have been practised.

Nodules of haematite with polished surfaces have been found as well; the shiny surfaces suggest that the nodules were used to finish leather.

Pottery jars with a volume of up to 30 litres were discovered in a number of the Skara Brae dwellings.

Other artefacts excavated on site made of animal, fish, bird, and whalebone, whale and walrus ivory, and orca teeth included awls, needles, knives, beads, adzes, shovels, small bowls and, remarkably, ivory pins up to 25 centimetres (9.8 in) long. These pins are similar to examples found in passage graves in the Boyne Valley, another piece of evidence suggesting a linkage between the two cultures. The eponymous Skaill knife was a commonly used tool in Skara Brae; it consists of a large stone flake, with a sharp edge used for cutting, knocked off a sandstone cobble. This neolithic tool is named after Skara Brae's location in the Bay of Skaill on Orkney. Skaill knives have been found throughout Orkney and Shetland.

The 1972 excavations reached layers that had remained waterlogged and had preserved items that otherwise would have been destroyed. These include a twisted skein of heather, one of a very few known examples of Neolithic rope, and a wooden handle.

In 2016, a carved whalebone figurine dubbed 'Skara Brae Buddo' was rediscovered in a box at Stromness Museum. Thought to be 5,000 years old, the artefact has four holes, in similar positioning to eyes, a mouth and a navel. The figurine was only known about because of a sketch recorded by antiquarian George Petrie in the 19th century.

== Related sites in Orkney ==
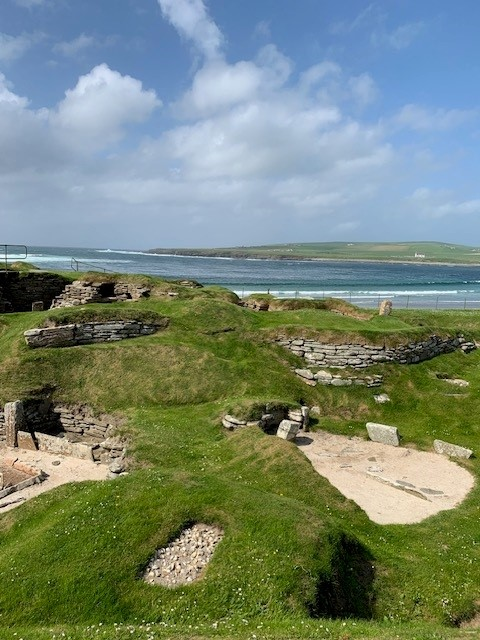
Skara Brae in the sunshine

Knap of Howar, on the Orkney island of Papa Westray, is a well-preserved Neolithic farmstead. Dating from 3500 BC to 3100 BC, it is similar in design to Skara Brae, but from an earlier period, and it is thought to be the oldest preserved standing building in northern Europe.

The Barnhouse Settlement is by Loch of Harray on the Orkney Mainland, not far from the Standing Stones of Stenness. Excavations were conducted between 1986 and 1991, over time revealing the base courses of at least 15 houses. The houses have similarities to those of the early phase of Skara Brae in that they have central hearths, beds built against the walls and stone dressers, and internal drains, but differ in that the houses seem to have been free-standing. The settlement dates back to circa 3000 BC.

A comparable, though smaller, site exists at Rinyo on Rousay, Orkney. Unusually, no Maeshowe-type tombs have been found on Rousay and although there are a large number of Orkney–Cromarty chambered cairns, these were built by Unstan ware people.

There is also a site currently under excavation at Links of Noltland on Westray that appears to have similarities to Skara Brae.

== World Heritage status ==
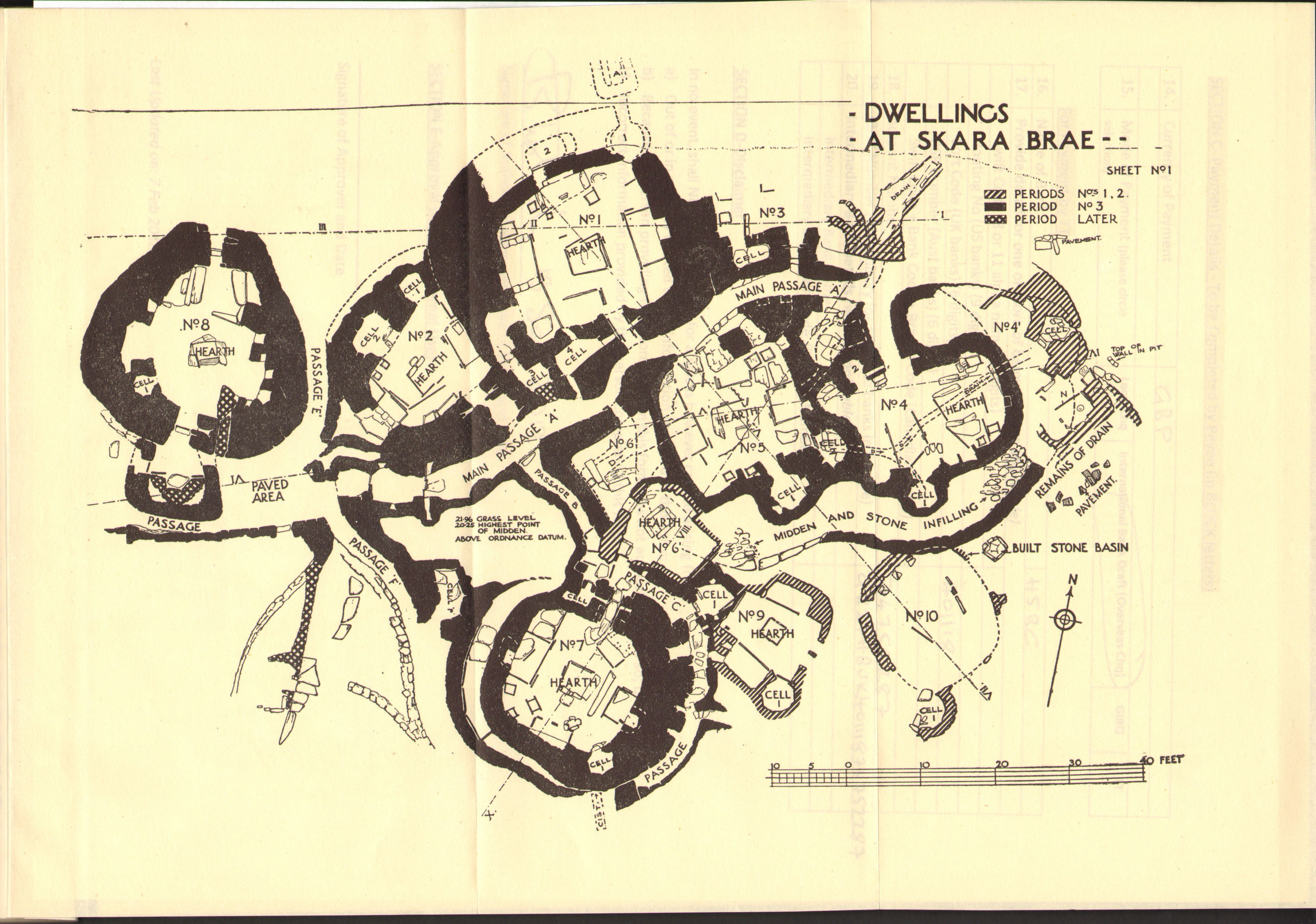
Site Plan

"The Heart of Neolithic Orkney" was inscribed as a World Heritage site in December 1999. In addition to Skara Brae the site includes Maeshowe, the Ring of Brodgar, the Standing Stones of Stenness and other nearby sites. It is managed by Historic Environment Scotland, whose "Statement of Significance" for the site begins:

The monuments at the heart of Neolithic Orkney and Skara Brae proclaim the triumphs of the human spirit in early ages and isolated places. They were approximately contemporary with the mastabas of the archaic period of Egypt (first and second dynasties), the brick temples of Sumeria, and the first cities of the Harappa culture in India, and a century or two earlier than the Golden Age of China. Unusually fine for their early date, and with a remarkably rich survival of evidence, these sites stand as a visible symbol of the achievements of early peoples away from the traditional centres of civilisation.

Some areas and facilities were closed due to the worldwide COVID-19 pandemic during parts of 2020 and into 2021.

== Risk from climate change ==
In 2019, a risk assessment was performed to assess the site's vulnerability to climate change. The report by Historic Environment Scotland, the Orkney Islands Council and others concludes that the entire Heart of Neolithic Orkney World Heritage Site, and in particular Skara Brae, is "extremely vulnerable" to climate change due to rising sea levels, increased rainfall and other factors; it also highlights the risk that Skara Brae could be partially destroyed by one unusually severe storm.

== In popular culture ==
=== Literature ===
- The 1968 children's novel The Boy with the Bronze Axe by Kathleen Fidler is set during the final days of Skara Brae. A similar theme appears in Rosemary Sutcliff's 1977 novel Shifting Sands, which also portrays the gradual abandonment of the settlement and the evacuation of its inhabitants.
- In Kim Stanley Robinson's 1991 novelette A History of the Twentieth Century, with Illustrations, the main character visits Skara Brae and other Neolithic sites in the Orkney Islands during a journey undertaken to gain perspective on the violent history of the twentieth century.

=== Music ===
- The Irish traditional music group Skara Brae took its name from the settlement. The group released a single album, Skara Brae, in 1971; it was reissued on CD in 1998.

=== Film and television ===
- In the film Indiana Jones and the Kingdom of the Crystal Skull, Indiana Jones is shown lecturing his students about Skara Brae, where he gives the date as "3100 BC".
- Skara Brae's ancient sewer system and its use of running water are referenced by Medical Examiner Dr. Donald "Ducky" Mallard in the NCIS episode "Murder 2.0" (season 6, episode 6).

=== Video games ===
- The role-playing video game The Bard's Tale (1985) takes place in a fictional town named Skara Brae.
- The video game Starsiege: Tribes includes a multiplayer map named "Scarabrae".
- The video game series Ultima includes a city named Skara Brae.

=== Comics ===
- Skara Brae is used as the name for a Scottish pub in New York City in the IDW Teenage Mutant Ninja Turtles comic series.

=== Commemoration ===
- A commemorative stone was unveiled at Skara Brae on 12 April 2008 marking the anniversary of Soviet cosmonaut Yuri Gagarin becoming the first human to orbit the Earth in 1961.

=== Board Games ===
- In 2025, a board game was released about Skara Brae. It is a worker placement game for 1 to 4 players created by Shem Phillips.

== See also ==
- Maeshowe
- Ness of Brodgar
- Skaill House
- Standing Stones of Stenness
- Zenith of Iron Age Shetland
- Timeline of prehistoric Scotland
- List of oldest buildings
- List of oldest buildings in the United Kingdom
- List of World Heritage Sites in Scotland

== Bibliography ==
- Beck, Roger B.; Black, Linda; Krieger, Larry S.; Naylor, Phillip C.; Shabaka, Dahia Ibo (1999). World History: Patterns of Interaction. Evanston, IL: McDougal Littell. ISBN 0-395-87274-X.
- Bramwell, Peter (2009). Pagan Themes in Modern Children's Fiction: Green Man, Shamanism, Earth Mysteries. New York: Palgrave Macmillan. ISBN 978-0-230-21839-0.
- Bryson, Bill (2010). At home: a short history of private life. London; New York: Doubleday. ISBN 978-0-385-60827-5.
- Buckland, Paul C.; Sadler, Jon P. (2003). "Insects". In Edwards, Kevin J.; Ralston, Ian B.M. (eds.). Scotland After the Ice Age: Environment, Archaeology and History, 8000 BC – AD 1000. Edinburgh: Edinburgh University Press. ISBN 0-7486-1736-1.
- Burl, Aubrey (1976). The Stone Circles of the British Isles. London: Yale University Press. ISBN 0-300-01972-6.
- Burl, Aubrey (1979). Prehistoric Avebury. London: Yale University Press. ISBN 0-300-02368-5.
- Castleden, Rodney (1987). The Stonehenge People. London: Routledge & Kegan Paul Ltd. ISBN 0-7102-0968-1.
- Childe, V. Gordon (1931). Skara Brae, a Pictish Village in Orkney. meeting held in London: monograph of the Royal Commission on the Ancient and Historical Monuments of Scotland.
- Childe, V. Gordon; Simpson, W. Douglas (1952). Illustrated History of Ancient Monuments: Vol. VI Scotland. Edinburgh: Her Majesty's Stationery Office.
- Childe, V. Gordon; Clarke, D. V. (1983). Skara Brae. Edinburgh: Her Majesty's Stationery Office. ISBN 0-11-491755-8.
- Clarke, D.V.; Sharples, Niall (1985). Settlements and Subsistence in the Third Millennium BC, in: Renfrew, Colin (Ed.) The Prehistory of Orkney BC 4000–1000 AD. Edinburgh: Edinburgh University Press. ISBN 0-85224-456-8.
- Darvill, Timothy (1987). Prehistoric Britain. London: Yale University Press. ISBN 0-300-03951-4.
- Fenton, Alexander (1978). Northern Isles: Orkney and Shetland. John Donald Publishers Ltd. ISBN 0-85976-019-7.
- Fidler, Kathleen (2005). The Boy with the Bronze Axe. Edinburgh: Floris Books. ISBN 978-0-86315-488-1.
- Hadingham, Evan (1975). Circles and Standing Stones: An Illustrated Exploration of the Megalith Mysteries of Early Britain. New York: Walker and Company. ISBN 0-8027-0463-8.
- Hawkes, Jacquetta (1986). The Shell Guide to British Archaeology. London: Michael Joseph. ISBN 0-7181-2448-0.
- Hedges, John W. (1984). Tomb of the Eagles: Death and Life in a Stone Age Tribe. New York: New Amsterdam. ISBN 0-941533-05-0.
- Keatinge, T.H.; Dickson, J.H. (1979). "Mid Flandrian Changes in Vegetation in Mainland Orkney". New Phytol. 82 (2): 585–612. Bibcode:1979NewPh..82..585K. doi:10.1111/j.1469-8137.1979.tb02684.x.
- Laing, Lloyd (1974). Orkney and Shetland: An Archaeological Guide. Newton Abbott: David and Charles Ltd. ISBN 0-7153-6305-0.
- Laing, Lloyd & Jennifer (1982). The Origins of Britain. London: Paladin. ISBN 0-586-08370-7.
- MacKie, Euan (1977). Science and Society in Prehistoric Britain. London: Palgrave Macmillan. ISBN 0-312-70245-0.
- Piggott, Stuart (1970) [1954]. The Neolithic Cultures of the British Isles. Cambridge University Press. ISBN 0-521-07781-8.
- Ritchie, Anna (1995). Prehistoric Orkney. London: B.T. Batsford Ltd. ISBN 0-7134-7593-5.
- Ritchie, Graham & Anna (1981). Scotland: Archaeology and Early History. New York: Thames and Hudson. ISBN 0-500-27365-0.
