= Stenness =

Coordinates: 58.986°N 3.208°W

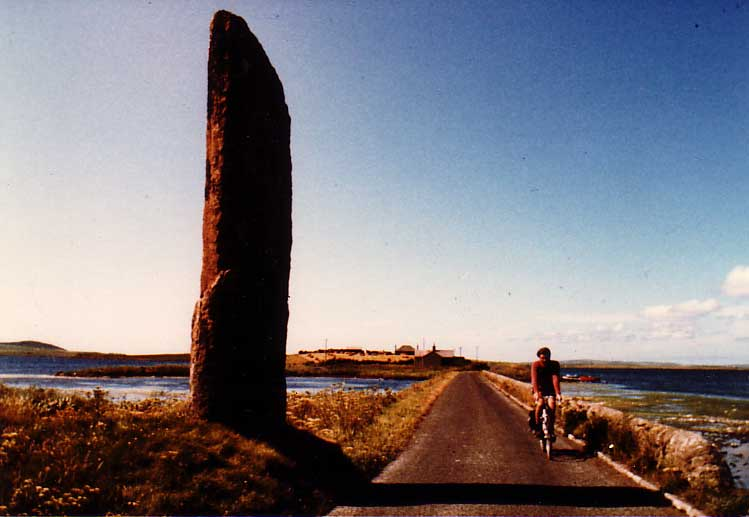
- The Stenness Watch Stone stands outside the circle, next to the modern bridge leading to the Ring of Brodgar.

- Location within Orkney
- OS grid reference: HY305115
- Civil parish: Stenness
- Council area: Orkney
- Lieutenancy area: Orkney
- Country: Scotland
- Sovereign state: United Kingdom
- Post town: STROMNESS
- Postcode district: KW16
- Dialling code: 01856
- Police: Scotland
- Fire: Scottish
- Ambulance: Scottish
- UK Parliament: Orkney and Shetland
- Scottish Parliament: Orkney

Stenness (pronounced /ˈstɛnɪs/) (Old Norse: Steinnes; Norn: Stennes) is a village and parish on the Orkney Mainland in Scotland. It is part of Orkney Islands Council. It contains several notable prehistoric monuments including the Standing Stones of Stenness and the Ring of Brodgar. The parish lies amid fertile farmland typical of Orkney and the economy is based on agriculture, fisheries, tourism, and renewable energy.

== History ==
Human presence in the region date back at least 5,000 years, evidenced by the Neolithic ritual complex including the Standing Stones of Stenness and nearby Ring of Brodgar. The Odin Stone, a medieval-era monolith once part of these traditions, was destroyed in 1814 but is well documented as part of local ritual lore. In Old Norse, Steinnes means headland of the stone. or Steinsnes means headland/peninsula of the stone.

== Geography ==
Stennes is a village and parish on the Orkney Mainland in Scotland, situated approximately 7 km (4.3 mi) east of Stromness and 13 km (8.1 mi) west of Kirkwall. It covers an area of 36.8 km^{2} (14.2 sq mi), adjoining the southern extremity of the Loch of Stenness, and is bounded by five neighbouring parishes. The Mainland, where Stenness lies, is the largest island in the archipelago. The topography is characterized by a gently sloping rim, surrounding the flat lands of Loch of Stenness in the basin floor. The geology largely consists of red sandstone, deposited around 380 million years ago. The Loch of Stenness is divided into upper (Loch of Harray) and lower parts, and connects to the Bay of Ireland via a narrow sea inlet crossed by the Bridge of Waith. The lower loch is saltwater and brackish, while the upper part is mostly fresh. The Bridge of Brogar connects two promontories that nearly meet near the loch’s center. It is part of Orkney Islands Council and local governance is represented by the Firth and Stenness Community Council which engages in local infrastructure and development.

== Economy ==
The parish lies amid fertile farmland typical of Orkney and the economy is based on agriculture, fisheries, tourism, and renewable energy. Stenness is renowned for its Neolithic standing stones, which originally had 12 tall stones, of which only three remain including the pierced Stone of Odin. The larger Ring of Brogar originally had 60 stones encircled by a wide ditch of which only a portion remain today. Nearby is Maeshowe, a old burial mound, and the old House of Stenness, mentioned by Walter Scott. The parish church was built in 1793.

== See also ==
- Burn of Ayreland
- Happy Valley (garden)
