= Bay of Skaill =

Small bay on the west coast of the Orkney Mainland, Scotland

Coordinates: 59°3′12″N 3°20′14″W

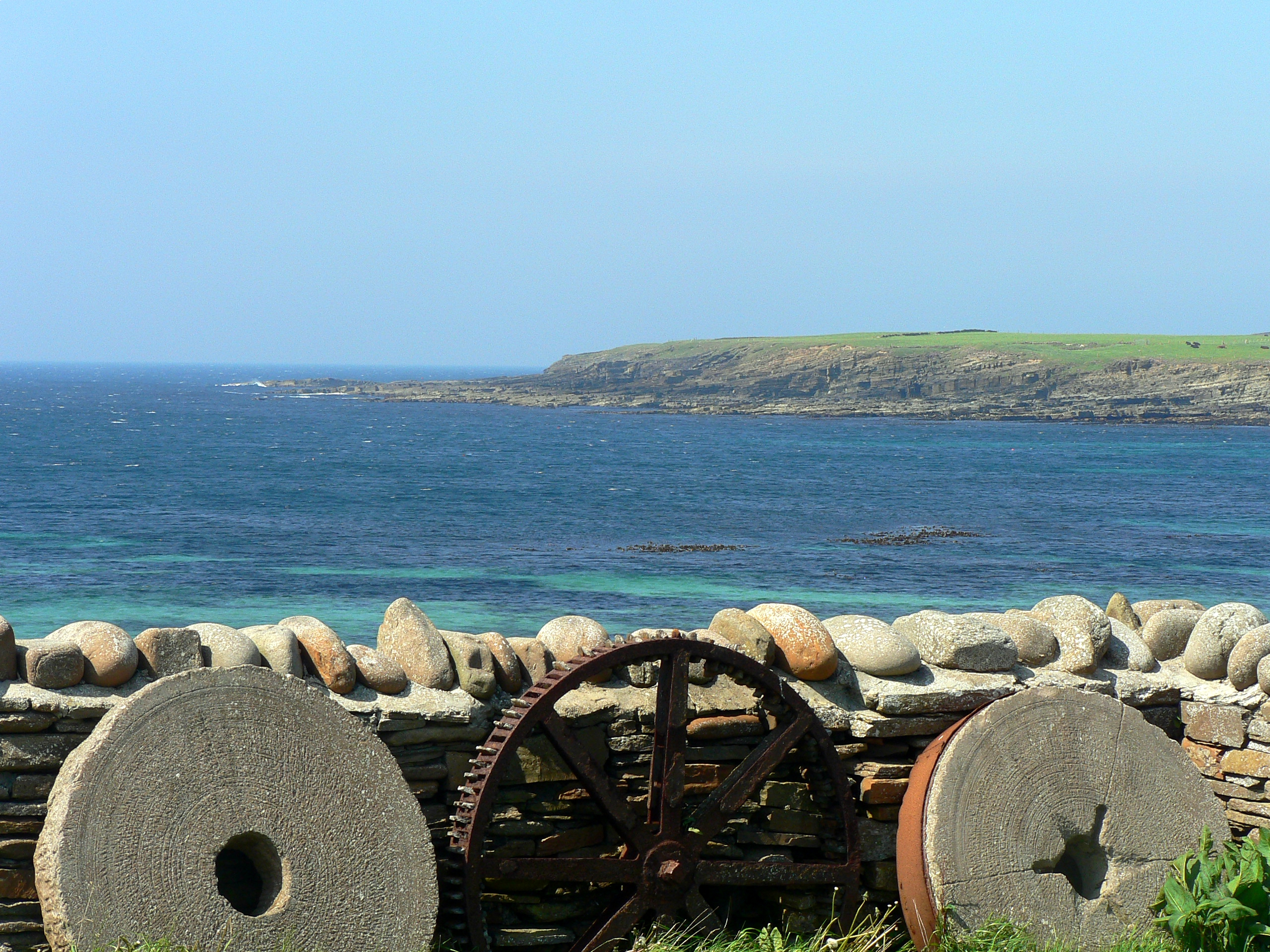
Bay of Skaill seen from Skara Brae site

The Bay of Skaill (from Old Norse Bugr Skála) is a small bay on the west coast of the Orkney Mainland, Scotland.

== Visitor attractions ==
Bay of Skaill is the location of the famous Neolithic settlement, Skara Brae, and a large residence, Skaill House, the property of the laird on whose estate Skara Brae was discovered. Skaill House has connections with Captain James Cook.

== Skaill Viking hoard ==
In March 1858, a boy named David Linklater was digging at Muckle Brae, near the Sandwick parish church, when he came across a few pieces of silver lying in the earth. Astounded by the find, Linklater was soon joined by a number of folk. Together they unearthed over one hundred items. This hoard is the largest Viking treasure trove found so far in Scotland.
