= List of oldest buildings in the United Kingdom =

List of the oldest extant buildings in the UK

This article lists the oldest extant freestanding buildings in the United Kingdom. In order to qualify for the list a structure must:

- be a recognisable building
- either incorporate features of building work from the claimed date to at least 1.5 metres (4.9 ft) in height and/or be a listed building.
- incorporate features of building work of the above nature that date from no later than AD 1300.

Roads are excluded although other structures such as bridges may be included if they otherwise fulfil the above criteria.

== Before 500 BC ==
Building		Location	Date built	Notes
Knap of Howar		Papa Westray, Orkney, Scotland	3800 BC	A Neolithic farmstead, probably the oldest preserved stone house in northern Europe.
West Kennet Long Barrow		Wiltshire, England	3650 BC	Passage grave located near Silbury Hill and Avebury stone circle.
Midhowe Chambered Cairn	Midhowe Cairn interior - geograph.org.uk - 33776	Rousay, Orkney, Scotland	3500 BC	A well-preserved example of the Orkney-Cromarty type of chambered cairn.
Trethevy Quoit		Tremar, Cornwall	3700 - 3500 BC	A well preserved Neolithic dolmen in Cornwall. It is regarded as one of the most impressive in Britain. This chamber tomb is dated from the Neolithic or late Stone Age, and may have been built around 3500 BC. It is sited on a promontory overlooking the confluence of streams which flow southwards to become the River Seaton; the northern skyline is dominated by Caradon Hill and granite massif of Bodmin Moor.
Pentre Ifan		Nanhyfer, Pembrokeshire, Wales	3500 BC	The largest and best preserved Neolithic dolmen in Wales.
Tomb of the Eagles		South Ronaldsay, Orkney, Scotland	3150 BC	This chambered tomb was in use for 800 years or more. 16,000 human bones were found here, as well as 725 bird bones, predominantly white-tailed sea eagle.
Skara Brae		Bay of Skaill, Mainland Orkney, Scotland	3100 BC	A large stone-built Neolithic village on Mainland, Orkney, Scotland 3180 BC–2500 BC. Europe's most complete Neolithic village with a high level of preservation and sophistication including furnishings and drainage.
Unstan Chambered Cairn		Stenness, Mainland Orkney, Scotland	3400–2800 BC	An Orkney-Cromarty chambered cairn.
Belas Knap		Winchcombe, Gloucestershire, England	3000 BC	A Neolithic long barrow with what appears to be the main entrance, with intricate dry-stone walling and large limestone jambs and lintels is, in fact, a false one. The actual burial chambers are down the long east and west sides of the barrow and at its southern foot. There are four burial chambers, two on opposite sides near the middle, one at the south-east angle and one at the south end. These are formed of upright stone slabs, linked by dry-stone walling and originally had corbelled roofs.
Maeshowe		Stenness, Mainland Orkney, Scotland	2700 BC	A large and unique chambered cairn and passage grave, aligned so that its central chamber is illuminated on the winter solstice.
Barnhouse Settlement		Stenness, Mainland Orkney, Scotland	2600 BC	A Neolithic settlement.
Grimspound		Dartmoor, Devon, England	1300 BC	A late Bronze Age settlement composed of stone houses and a surrounding wall.

== 500 BC to AD 500 ==
Building	Location	Date built	Notes
Jarlshof	Sumburgh, Shetland, Scotland	200 BC	A complex of preserved wheelhouses, amongst the remains of a variety of much older and more recent buildings.
Broch of Mousa	Mousa, Shetland, Scotland	1st century BC	Located on a small island in Shetland, this is the best preserved of numerous brochs from this period.
Bartlow Hills	Bartlow Hills in Ashdon Parish Essex near Bartlow, Cambridgeshire.	1st–2nd Century	A Roman tumuli cemetery. There were originally seven Bartlow mounds. The tallest at 15 metres in height is the largest barrow north of the Alps.
Viroconium	Wroxeter, Shropshire	1st–2nd Century	Remains of Roman masonry including a substantial freestanding element from the bathhouse.
Temple of Claudius, Colchester	Colchester, Essex, England	c. 60	The substantial podium and vaults are of the Roman temple (of Camulodunum, capital of Roman Britain). The Norman castle above dates from c. 1076.
Vinovia	Bishop Auckland, County Durham, England	mid 70s AD	Remains of a Roman Fort and settlement.
Caerleon Roman Amphitheatre	Caerleon, Newport, Wales	c. 80	A well preserved Roman amphitheatre, oval in shape with eight entrances, used during the Roman settlement period at Isca Augusta for events with a capacity of around six thousand. Accompanied by other features from the period including the Caerleon Roman baths and other recovered items preserved at the Welsh National Roman Legion Museum in the town.
Balkerne Gate	Colchester, Essex, England	c. 80	The remainder of the gateway through the Roman wall of Colchester is the largest surviving gateway in Roman Britain.
Roman lighthouse at Dover Castle	Dover, Kent	1st century	One of the three remaining Roman lighthouses in the world, from the ancient port of Dubris.
Hardknott Roman Fort	Cumbria	c. 120–138	A Roman fort on the west side of Hardknott pass.
'Walls Castle'	Ravenglass, Cumbria	c. 120	Remains of Roman bathhouse: one of the largest remaining Roman structures in Britain
Hadrian's Wall	Northern England	c. 122	A Roman defensive fortification.
Housesteads Roman Fort	Hexham, Northumberland, England	c. 124	The remains of an auxiliary fort along Hadrian’s Wall.
Jewry Wall	Leicester, Leicestershire, England	c. 125	The Jewry Wall is a substantial ruined wall of 2nd-century Roman masonry, with two large archways, in Leicester, England. It formed the west wall of a public building in Ratae Corieltauvorum (Roman Leicester), alongside public baths, the foundations of which were excavated in the 1930s and are also open to view.
Edin's Hall Broch	Duns, Berwickshire, Scotland	c. 140	Substantial broch, sited on a much earlier hill fort. One of a very few built south of the Highlands and Islands.
London Wall	London, England	c. 200	Significant remains of Roman wall at various locations in Londinium (modern-day London)
Painted House	Dover, Kent, England	c. 200	Also one of the best preserved Roman houses in Britain
Portus Adurni/Portchester Castle	Portchester, Hampshire	285–290	Complete remains of large Roman walled fort. The best preserved Roman fort north of the Alps
Pevensey Castle	Pevensey, East Sussex	280s	The outer curtain wall is the remains of the Roman fort called Anderitum.
Cardiff Castle	Cardiff, Wales	c. 290	The outer curtain wall incorporates sections of the Cardiff Roman Fort.
Newport Arch	Lincoln	3rd century	Intact arch of the former Roman gate. Part of the Roman fortifications around Lindum Colonia (modern-day Lincoln).
Multangular Tower and wall	York	4th century	Surviving parts of the Roman fortifications around Eboracum (modern-day York).
Calleva Atrebatum surviving walls	Silchester, Hampshire, England	4th century	Surviving walls and amphitheater of the Roman city of Calleva Atrebatum (modern-day Silchester).

== AD 500 to AD 1000 ==
Building		Location	Earliest extant structure date	Notes
Beehive cells		Eileach an Naoimh, Argyll, Scotland	6th century	The monastic centre on this island was founded by St. Brendan the Navigator in 542. The oldest remains include a double beehive cell and a grave and cross-slab associated with Eithne the mother of Columba. These are the oldest extant church buildings in Scotland and possibly Britain.
St Martin's Church, Canterbury		Canterbury, Kent	597	The oldest church building in England, still functioning as an Anglican parish church. St Martin's was the private chapel of Queen Bertha of Kent in the 6th century before Augustine arrived from Rome.
Nendrum Monastery mill		Mahee Island in Strangford Lough, County Down, Northern Ireland	619	The tide mill is part of the Nendrum Monastery site. The wood from the mill has been dated to 619, making it one of the oldest excavated tide mills in the world.
Church of St Peter-on-the-Wall		Bradwell-on-Sea, Essex, England	654	The chapel is assumed to be that of "Ythanceaster" (Bede, book III, chapter XXII), originally constructed as an Anglo-Celtic Church for the East Saxons in AD 654 by St Cedd, astride the ruins of the abandoned Roman fort of Othona incorporating the Roman bricks and stones.
Escomb Church		Escomb, County Durham, England	670	
Ripon Cathedral		Ripon, North Yorkshire, England	672	Only the crypt survives at all – the earliest part of the cathedral itself is 1069
Hexham Abbey		Hexham, Northumberland, England	674	St. Wilfred's 7th-century crypt survives, built largely out of stones from the Roman city of Coria (modern-day Corbridge). The main part of the abbey church dates to the 12th and 13th centuries.
St Peter's Church		Monkwearmouth, Sunderland, England	674	Founded as part of the Benedictine double monastery of Monkwearmouth–Jarrow Abbey.
St Mary Magdalene Church, Hart		Hart, County Durham, England	675	
St Paul's Church		Jarrow, Tyne and Wear, England	680	The Saxon chancel survives.
Anglian Tower		York	7th century	Surviving part of the Northumbrian fortifications around York
St Laurence's Church		Bradford on Avon, Wiltshire, England	7th century	One of the oldest unaltered Anglo-Saxon churches in England. May have been founded by St. Aldhelm.
St Mary's Priory		Deerhurst, Gloucestershire, England	7th century	Anglo-Saxon church. Part of the Diocese of Gloucester.
St Mary the Virgin Church		Prittlewell, Essex, England	Pre-conquest (pre-1066) north wall, incorporating probably 7th century arch	
All Saints Church		Brixworth, Northamptonshire, England	650–870	
Abbey Church of St Mary the Virgin		Sherborne, Dorset	705	Saxon cathedral 705 - 1075. Benedictine abbey 998 - 1539
Saint Helen's Chapel		Colchester, Essex, England	8th century	In the middle of the 8th century, Offa visited Colchester and built a chapel dedicated to St. Helen. This small chapel is now an Antiochian Orthodox church.
St Peter's Church		Conisbrough, South Yorkshire, England	8th century	
Greensted Church		Greensted, Essex, England	845	The oldest wooden church in the world
St Mary's Church, Barby	St Mary's Church, Barby	Barby, Northamptonshire, England	891	Foundation attributed to 891.
St Nicholas' Church, Leicester		Leicester, Leicestershire, England	c. 900	
St Peter's Church, Barton-upon-Humber		Barton-upon-Humber, North Lincolnshire	9th (baptistery) and 10th centuries	One of the best-known Anglo-Saxon buildings, owing to its role in Thomas Rickman's identification of the style.
St Nicholas' Church		Worth, Crawley, England	c. 950 / 1050	
St Mary's Church		Sompting, West Sussex, England	c. 960	
All Saints' Church, Earls Barton		Earls Barton, Northamptonshire	c. 970	Even though only the tower survives from the original church, this is one of the best examples of later Anglo-Saxon architecture.
Stow Minster		Stow, Lincolnshire	975	Cathedral church of the ancient Diocese of Lindsey. On site of earlier 7th-century building.
Nendrum Monastery		Mahee Island in Strangford Lough, County Down, Northern Ireland	9th or 10th century	Pre-Norman monastic site, the church dates to the 9th or 10th century. When the site was rediscovered, a sun dial dating to around AD 900 was found.
St Mary's Church		Northchurch Hertfordshire.	Late Anglo-Saxon.	The south and part of the west wall are Saxon. The church was probably the pre-conquest (pre-1066) parish church of Berkhamsted.

== 11th century ==
Building	Location	Earliest extant structure date	Notes
St Bene't's Church	Cambridge, Cambridgeshire	c. 1000	The tower is believed to have been built around c.1000, although the bell louvers were added in 1586. The tower contains 6 bells, the oldest of which was cast in 1588
Holy Trinity Church	Colchester, Essex, England	1020	Oldest building in Colchester, which has an Anglo-Saxon tower with an arrow head doorway. Burial place of William Gilbert and madrigal composer John Wilbye. Grade I listed building.
Corhampton Church	Corhampton, Hampshire, England	c. 1020	This is one of the few remaining Saxon churches in regular use and in good repair, surviving substantially unaltered. It dates to the first quarter of the eleventh century and probably before 1020.
St Andrews Church	Ashingdon, Essex, England	1020	The parish church which lies on Ashingdon Hill, one of the parish's three hills, was built in 1020, 4 years after the Battle of Assandun, by the order of the king, Canute the Great of Denmark. The grade II listed parish church of Saint Andrew's is also called "Ashingdon Minster".
St Martin's Church, Wareham	Wareham, Dorset, England	1030	Anglo-Saxon features include a tall, narrow nave and chancel, late Anglo-Saxon wall-arcading in the north west aisle and traces of a Saxon door.
St Michael at the North Gate	Oxford, England	1040	The tower dates from 1040. Probably Oxford's oldest building.
St George's Tower, Oxford Castle	Oxford, England	Uncertain, perhaps mid-11th century	Although Oxford Castle is Norman, it incorporates St George's tower which may be part of the town's late Saxon defences.
Holy Trinity Church	Great Paxton, Cambridgeshire, England	1050	One of only three Anglo-Saxon aisled churches to be found today in England
St Chad's Church	Stafford, Staffordshire, England	1050	
Berkhamsted Castle	Berkhamsted, Hertfordshire, England	1067 (A fossarius – a specialised ditch digger – was recorded as being in the town in the Domesday book 1086. Radiocarbon dating of organic remains from within the castle's motte indicates a post 1066 construction date.)	After William the Conqueror defeated and killed Harold II at the Battle of Hastings in October 1066, the Anglo-Saxons submitted to him at Berkhamsted in early December 1066. William granted the "Honour of Berkhamsted" to his half-brother, Robert, Count of Mortain, who built a wooden fortification. The castle was substantially rebuilt in the mid-12th century, probably by Thomas Becket. In the 13th-century Richard Earl of Cornwall added a palace complex and Edward III further developed the castle in the 14th century. The castle was abandoned in 1496 and today only earthworks and ruins remain. In 1833 the castle became the first historic site in England to be protected by statute, though the new railway line in 1834 did demolish the castle's gatehouse and outer earthworks to the south.
Chepstow Castle	Chepstow, Monmouthshire, Wales	1067	Part of fortifications built in the Welsh Marshes by William FitzOsbern, 1st Earl of Hereford. Used in the Norman invasion of Wales.
Norwich Castle	Norwich, East Anglia, England	1067	Constructed on the orders of William the Conqueror during the Norman conquest of England to cement control over East Anglia.
Lincoln Castle	Lincoln	1068 (completed)	Ordered built by William the Conqueror. One of the best preserved Norman castles in England. Continues to be used as a law court.
Canterbury Cathedral	Canterbury, Kent, England	1070	Founded in 597. Rebuilt in the 11th century under Archbishop Lanfranc, St. Anselm of Canterbury, and Prior Ernulf based on the Abbey of Saint-Étienne, Caen.
St. Michael's Church, Southampton	Southampton, Hampshire, England	1070	The west wall has one of the original Norman pilaster buttresses.
Richmond Castle	Richmond, North Yorkshire, England	Constructed from 1071	Norman castle constructed by Alan Rufus.
Lincoln Cathedral	Lincoln	1072	Constructed in 1072 by Bishop Remigius de Fécamp. Largely destroyed by the 1185 East Midlands earthquake, after which it was rebuilt. Parts of the west end remain of the original.
Durham Castle	Durham, England	1072 started	Norman castle constructed by Waltheof, Earl of Northumbria.
Tower of London	London, England	1078	Constructed by William the Conqueror.
Hereford Cathedral	Hereford, England	1079	Construction started by Bishop Robert of Lorraine.
Rochester Cathedral	Rochester, Kent, England	1080	Gundulf of Rochester's tower and the core of the nave piers.
Ely Cathedral	Ely, Cambridgeshire, England	1083 started	
Shrewsbury Abbey	Shrewsbury, Shropshire, England	1083	Founded by Roger de Montgomery. Important pilgrimage site in medieval England.
Hedingham Castle	Castle Hedingham, Essex	c. 1086	The manor of Hedingham was awarded to Aubrey de Vere I by William the Conqueror by 1086. The castle was constructed by the de Veres in the late 11th to early 12th century and the keep in the 1130s and 1140s.
Icomb Place	Icomb, Gloucestershire, England	1085	Earliest records show that Icomb Place was owned by Walter de Lacy, Lord of Weobley and Ludlow who passed it to his son Roger de Lacy in 1085
St Albans Cathedral	St Albans, Hertfordshire, England	1089	
St Nicholas Church	Iford, East Sussex, England	c. 1090	
Durham Cathedral	Durham, England	1093 started	Building commenced in 1093 and was largely completed within 40 years. Durham Cathedral is the only cathedral in England to retain almost all of its Norman craftsmanship, and one of few to preserve the unity and integrity of its original design. The nave, quire and transepts are all Norman.
St Mary's Church, Harrow on the Hill	Harrow on the Hill, England	1087 started	Lanfranc, Archbishop of Canterbury, began the construction of a church on this site in 1087. The new church building, now completed and dedicated in the name of the Blessed Virgin Mary, was consecrated by St Anselm on 4 January 1094.
Winchester Cathedral	Winchester, Hampshire, England	1079 started 1093 consecrated	Constructed by Bishop Walkelin.
Norwich Cathedral	Norwich, Norfolk, England	1096	Constructed by Bishop Herbert de Losinga.
Westminster Hall	City of Westminster, England	1097	Oldest existing part of the Palace of Westminster. The roof was possibly originally supported by pillars, giving three aisles, but during the reign of King Richard II, this was replaced by a hammerbeam roof in 1393. However, recent archaeological explorations found no evidence of these pillars, and the roof may have been self-supporting from the beginning.
Buckfast Abbey	Buckfastleigh, England	1134 or 1136, The first abbey at Buckfast was founded as a Benedictine monastery in 1018. The abbey was believed to be founded by either Aethelweard (Aylward), Earldorman of Devon, or King Cnut. This first monastery was "small and unprosperous", and the exact site is uncertain. Archaeological evidence suggests the monastery may have been located nearby at what is now Holy Trinity church in Buckfastleigh. In 1134 or 1136, the abbey was established in its current position.	Constructed by Æthelwald, Ealdorman of East Anglia or King Canute .
Lancaster Castle	Lancaster, Lancashire, England	Speculated 11th century although exact date is unknown.	Constructed by Roger de Poictou, the holder of the Honour of Lancaster.
Borley Church	Borley, Essex	11th century	A small 11th century church. Later renovations have resulted in the mainly perpendicular style of the mid-14th to 16th centuries.
Conisbrough Castle	Conisbrough, South Yorkshire	11th Century	Originally built by William de Warenne, 1st Earl of Surrey.
St Botolph's Church	Botolphs, West Sussex	11th Century	A small parish church among the South Downs.

== 12th century ==
Building	Location	Earliest extant structure date	Notes
St Marys Church, Little Abington	Little Abington, Cambridgeshire	c. 1100 (nave only)	The nave has a very fine example of a rounded arched doorway.
St Laurence and All Saints Church, Eastwood	Eastwood, Essex, England	c. 1100 nave	
Church of St Martin of Tours	Detling, Kent, England	c. 1100	
St Andrew's Church	South Shoebury, Essex, England	c. 1100–1140 nave and chancel	
Wymondham Abbey	Wymondham, Norfolk, England	1107	
Church of St Andrew, Stogursey	Stogursey, Somerset, England	1107	
Merton Priory	Colliers Wood, London, England	1117	The priory was a centre of learning, including entrants; Nicholas Breakspeare in 1125 (who became Pope Adrian IV, the first English Pope, in 1154), Thomas Becket in 1130 and Walter de Merton, Lord Chancellor, Bishop of Rochester, and founder of Merton College, Oxford.
St Margaret's Chapel	Edinburgh Castle, Edinburgh, Scotland	1124	
St Andrew's Church	Haughton-le-Skerne, Darlington, County Durham	1125	
Furness Abbey	Barrow-in-Furness, Cumbria, England	1127	Abbey founded in 1123, construction of the church began in 1127 and some of this early fabric survives.
St Mary's Church, West Chiltington	West Chiltington, West Sussex, England	1100–1150	A Saxon building is recorded in the Domesday book, almost certainly on the same site. It is not known whether or not any of the older building was incorporated into the Norman structure.
Carlisle Castle	Carlisle, Cumbria, England	c. 1122–1135	
Cambridge Leper Chapel	Cambridge, Cambridgeshire	c. 1125	Built in 1125, The Leper Chapel was part of the buildings of a leprosy hospital that once stood on a road going to Bury St Edmunds and is one of the oldest buildings in Cambridge.
Rochester Castle	Rochester, Kent, England	1127	
St Rule's Tower	St Andrews, Fife, Scotland	1127	
Holyrood Abbey	Holyrood Palace, Edinburgh, Scotland	1128	Originally an abbey of the canons regular founded by King David I. Expanded into the royal palace during the Scottish Reformation.
Dunfermline Abbey	Dunfermline, Fife, Scotland	1128	
Church of Our Lady	Warnford, Hampshire, England	c. 1130	Norman west tower of c. 1130, Early English single-cell nave and chancel of c. 1190
All Hallows Church	Goodmanham, Yorkshire, England	c. 1130	
Church of the Holy Sepulchre	Cambridge, Cambridgeshire, England	c. 1130	Also known as The Round Church. The congregation moved to nearby St. Andrew the Great church in 1994.
Romsey Abbey	Romsey, Hampshire	c. 1130	Elements of the 10th-century Saxon church remain.
Dover Priory	Dover, Kent, England	1131	One of the oldest monastic refectories, still in use today by Dover College
Exeter Cathedral	Exeter, England	1133	Commenced building 1112, consecrated in 1133, and completed in 1170. Completely rebuilt between 1272 and 1342 except for the two transept towers.
Kirkstead Abbey	Kirkstead, Woodhall Spa, Lincolnshire, England	1139 (founded)	Destroyed during the English Reformation; only a single part remains
Egremont Castle	Egremont, Cumbria, England	c. 1140	The present castle was built by William de Meschines about 1130–1140, but there was an earlier Norman mound near this site. Further additions were made in the 13th century. In the 16th century there was an attempt to put Mary Queen of Scots on the Throne, and several northern nobles took part. Eight years later the castle was reported to be ruined and decayed.
Ancient Ram Inn	Wotton Under Edge, Gloucester	c. 1145	Once a part of a medieval manor, The Ancient Ram Inn is said to be one of the oldest houses in existence today. Built around 1145, it is considered the most haunted house in England.
Cubbie Roo's Castle	Wyre, Orkney, Scotland	c. 1145	The ruins include a small square keep still extant to 2.4 metres (8 ft) in height.
All Saints' Church	Walsoken, Cambridgeshire	c. 1146	A Grade I listed building consisting of a nave with south and north aisles, chancel with south and north chapels, south porch and west tower surmounted by a spire.
Saint Michael's and All Angels Church	Stewkley, Buckinghamshire, England	c. 1150	Very well preserved Norman Church, complete with font, and with minimal and very complimentary additions. https://greatenglishchurches.co.uk/html/stewkley.html
All Saints Church, East Meon	East Meon, Hampshire, England	c. 1150	One of the finest Norman churches in Hampshire. This cruciform church has a square, central Norman tower with decoration similar to that of Winchester Cathedral.
Temple Bruer Preceptory	Temple Bruer, Lincolnshire	c. 1150	
Birkenhead Priory	Birkenhead, Wirral, England	1150	
Holy Trinity Church	Southchurch, Essex, England	c. 1150 nave of original church, now part of the south aisle	
Jew's House	Lincoln, Lincolnshire, England	c. 1150	Townhouse on Steep Hill.
Adel St John the Baptist Church	Adel, Leeds, Yorkshire, England	1150	
Windsor Castle	Windsor, Berkshire, England	1154	
Bradwell Abbey	Milton Keynes, Buckinghamshire, England	1155	The Grade I Listed Chapel still remains, the inside of the chapel is often open to the public
Saltford Manor House	Saltford, Somerset, England	c. 1160	Winner of a Country Life contest in 2003 to find the "oldest continuously inhabited [private] house in Britain".
Warwick Castle	Warwick, Warwickshire, England	c. 1160	A "Burh" was built on the site in 914, replaced by a motte and bailey, in turn replaced by a stone keep by King Henry II (1154–89).
Newcastle Castle	Newcastle upon Tyne, Tyne and Wear, England	1172	The Castle Keep, which constitutes the oldest of the surviving structures, was built between 1172 and 1177 on the site of an older wooden castle.
Carrickfergus Castle	Carrickfergus, Northern Ireland	1177	Built by John de Courcy
Inch Abbey	Downpatrick, County Down, Northern Ireland	1177	Built by John de Courcy
Prittlewell Priory	Prittlewell, Essex, England	c. 1180 north wall of the refectory	Founded by Cluniac monks of St. Pancras Priory.
Killyleagh Castle	Killyleagh, County Down, Northern Ireland	c. 1180	Built as part of fortifications around Strangford Lough.
Church of St Nicholas, Eythorne	Kent, England	c. 1180	A small Romanesque church, with fine 12th-century carvings reminiscent of work done at Canterbury Cathedral in the 1170s.
Malmesbury Abbey	Malmesbury, Wiltshire, England	c. 1180	About a third of the original building remains, and is still in use
Quintin Castle	County Antrim, Northern Ireland	1184	Built by John de Courcy
Oakham Castle	Oakham, Rutland, England	1180–1190	The great hall remains and is Grade I listed. Entrance is free
Pembroke Castle	Pembroke, Pembrokeshire, Wales	c. 1189	Concentric stone castle built by William Marshall from 1189.
Newark Priory	Pyrford, Surrey, England	c. 1189–1199	Established in the late 12th century by Rauld de Calva and his wife Beatrice de Sandes for Augustinian canons. Still exists as ruins today and is listed as a Grade I Ancient Monument.
Holy Cross Church	Sarratt, Hertfordshire, England	c. 1190	The Victoria County History suggests that 'the main fabric of the chancel dates to the last decade of the 12th Century, with no architectural indication of an earlier date'. Contained within the church is believed to be the original 12th-century font and a 13th-century sarcophagus lid. Also notable is a rare survivor of High Medieval wall painting dated to c. 1370 AD.
Cleeve Abbey	Washford, Somerset, England	1198	
St Laurence's Church	Ludlow, Shropshire, England	1199	
St Michael and All Angels Church	Creaton, Northamptonshire, England	Early 12th century	Norman parish church which is still attended today. Construction possibly started late 11th century.
Holywood Priory	Holywood, County Down, Northern Ireland	c. 12th century	
St Oran's Chapel	Iona, Argyll, Scotland	12th century	Incorporates a 12th-century door. Could have been built by Óláfr Guðrøðarson, Guðrøðr Óláfsson, Somairle mac Gilla Brigte, or Ragnall mac Somairle.
Sketrick Castle	Whiterock, County Down, Northern Ireland	Late 12th century	
St Laurence's Church	Northfield, Birmingham, England	12th century	The church contains Early English gothic architecture.
St Mary's Church	Little Washbourne, Gloucestershire	12th century	Aspects of church date back to 12th century with first documentary evidence of church dated to 1240.
Dalmeny Kirk (St Cuthbert's)	Dalmeny, City of Edinburgh, Scotland	12th century	Norman/Romanesque parish church, still in use.
St Oswald's Church	York	c. 1125	Nave 1st half of the 12th C. Chancel in the 2nd half. Converted into a private house in the 1980s, it retains its simple layout, with two original windows in the nave north wall and a 14th-century east window. The 1795 brick tower was built on the foundations of a 14th-century stone tower which was taken down in the 17th century. Footings of an earlier church and a fragment of a 10th C cross have been found. Location remote from Fulford suggests link to adjacent wells and former crossing of the River Ouse.

== 13th century ==
Building	Location	Earliest extant structure date	Notes
Easaigh Church	Ensay, Na h-Eileanan Siar, Scotland	12th century	
Aberdour Castle	Aberdour, Fife, Scotland	c. 1200	Base of a late 12th- or early 13th-century hall house incorporated into later buildings
Dundrum Castle	Dundrum, County Down, Northern Ireland	1205 or earlier	Originally constructed by John de Courcy.
Icomb Place	Icomb, Gloucestershire, England	At least 1200–40	The first documented activity in the house was a "restoration" in 1200. The episcopal manor of Blockley owned the estate in 1086
Coleraine Castle	Coleraine, County Londonderry, Northern Ireland	Built 1214	Built by Thomas fitz Roland in 1214. Destroyed by Hugh de Lacy and Aodh Méith Ó Néill. Reconstructed by Thomas fitz Roland in 1228.
Salisbury Cathedral	Salisbury, Wiltshire, England	1220–1258	
Barley Barn	Between Witham and Braintree, Essex, England	c. 1220	Oldest standing timber-framed barn in the world, one of the earliest and largest of the possessions of the Knights Templar in England, modified in later centuries.
The Old Vicarage	Church End, Haynes, Bedfordshire, England	c. 1220	Deeds and public documents show the Advowson was transferred to Chicksands Priory in 1236; the house predates this and may date in part to 1140 or before. The cellars are medieval, although the upper structure was considerably altered in the 16th and 18th centuries. It is now a listed building.
St Mary the Virgin Church	North Shoebury, Essex, England	c. 1230 (chancel and possibly nave)	
St. Leonard's Without	Kirkstead, Woodhall Spa, Lincolnshire, England	1230–40	
St Andrew the Apostle (Wells Cathedral)	Wells, Somerset, England	1175–1239	Opened in 1239, this replaced an earlier church on the site since 705. Construction continued until 1490. Stands next to the oldest purely residential street in Europe.
Ancient Chapel of St.Andrew	Maghull, Merseyside, England.	13th Century.	Grade II* listed chapel sits alongside the Victorian church of St.Andrew.
St Nicolas' Church	Kings Norton, Birmingham, England	Early 13th century	
Westminster Abbey	Westminster, London, England	Rebuilt 1245–1517	Royal peculiar Grade I listed in 1958
St Peters Church	Maidstone, Kent, England	1261 (at least)	The original charter for the chapel is lost, but a confirmation charter exists from this year.
St Edmund's Chapel	Dover, Kent, England	1262	
York Castle	York, Yorkshire, England	1265	
Caerphilly Castle	Caerphilly, South Wales	1268–1271	A concentric stone castle surrounded by lakes, the second largest fortress in Britain.
Tintern Abbey	Tintern, Monmouthshire, Wales	1269–1301	The existing ruins of the great church date from this period.
All Hallows Church	Wellingborough, Northants.	c. 1280	Construction of the existing tower began c. 1280 and took 20 years to complete.
173, High Street, Berkhamsted	Berkhamsted, Hertfordshire, England	c. 1277–97	The oldest known extant jettied timber-framed building in Great Britain, dated by dendrochronology of structural timbers to between 1277 and 1297, currently in use as an estate agent and flat.
Dunluce Castle	County Antrim, Northern Ireland	c. 1271–1300	
White Island Monastic site	Lough Erne, County Fermanagh, Northern Ireland	13th century?	Carvings used in the ruined church building are thought to be dated to around 800 AD. The monastery itself was probably destroyed by Viking raiders in 837. Around 400 years later, a Romanesque style church was built on the site.
Holy Trinity Church (Hull Minster)	Kingston upon Hull, East Riding of Yorkshire	1285	Built on instruction of Edward I, fine example of medieval brick and stone Church, still in use today as a Church.
St Edburgha's Church, Yardley	Yardley, Birmingham, England	13th century	
St Mary's Church, Clifton	Clifton, Nottingham, England	C.1290	Grade I listed Church of England, built next Clifton Manor on the Clifton Estate historically for use by the Clifton Family. The Church contains a cast iron casing of the Crusaders Heart.

== See also ==
- List of oldest known surviving buildings in the world
- Hillforts in Britain:
  - List of hillforts in England
  - List of hillforts in Scotland
  - List of hillforts in Wales
- Newgrange, one of Ireland's oldest buildings dating from c. 3100 BC
- La Hougue Bie, one of Jersey's oldest buildings dating from c. 3500 BC
- Timeline of prehistoric Scotland
