= Ulmus 'Wingham' =

Elm cultivar

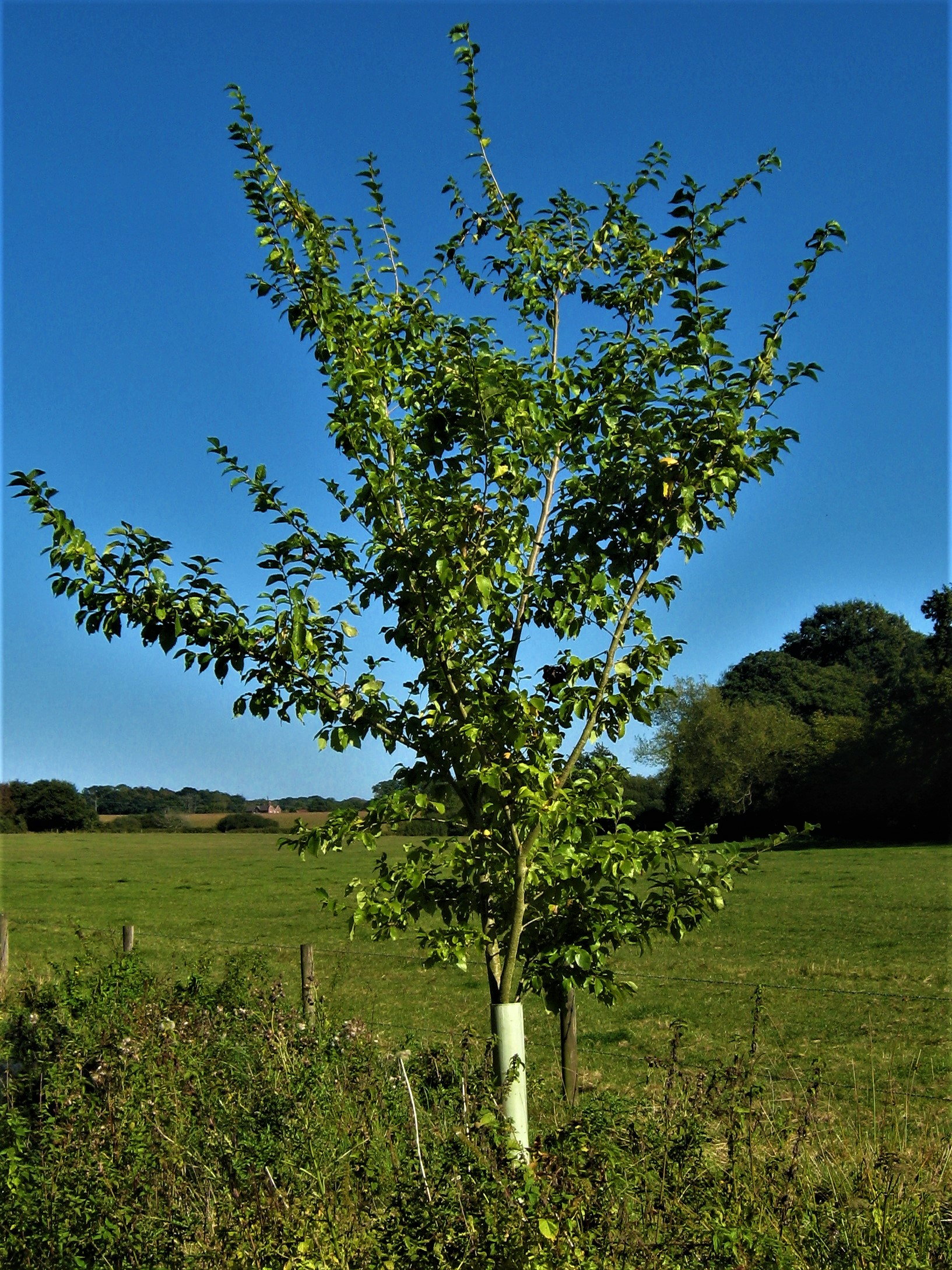
- 'Wingham', Boarhunt, Hampshire, UK
- Genus: Ulmus
- Hybrid parentage: (((U. wallichiana × U. minor) × (U. pumila × U. minor)) o.p. × (U. × hollandica ‘Vegeta’ × U. minor)) o.p.
- Cultivar: 'Wingham'
- Origin: IPP, Florence

Ulmus 'Wingham' is a complex hybrid elm cultivar featuring two Asiatic and two European species, bestowing it with an exceptionally high resistance to Dutch elm disease (DED). It was raised as clone no. FL493 by the Istituto per la Protezione delle Piante (IPP) in Florence, but never patented owing to its limited aesthetic appeal. It was introduced to the UK in 2011 by David Herling, Resistant Elms, who trialled it successfully at Wingham in Kent. It was later trialled by Hampshire & Isle of Wight Branch, Butterfly Conservation, as part of an assessment of DED-resistant cultivars as potential hosts of the endangered White-letter Hairstreak. 'Wingham' was released for sale in the UK in 2019.

== Description ==
Branching is typically rather irregular and unbalanced, but the foliage strongly resembles that of its ancestor, U. × hollandica ‘Vegeta’, better known as the Huntingdon Elm, the colour ranging from mid-green to a dark malachite. The samarae are generally obovate, typically 25 mm × 16 mm (0.98 in × 0.63 in), the seed central, with relatively long petioles.

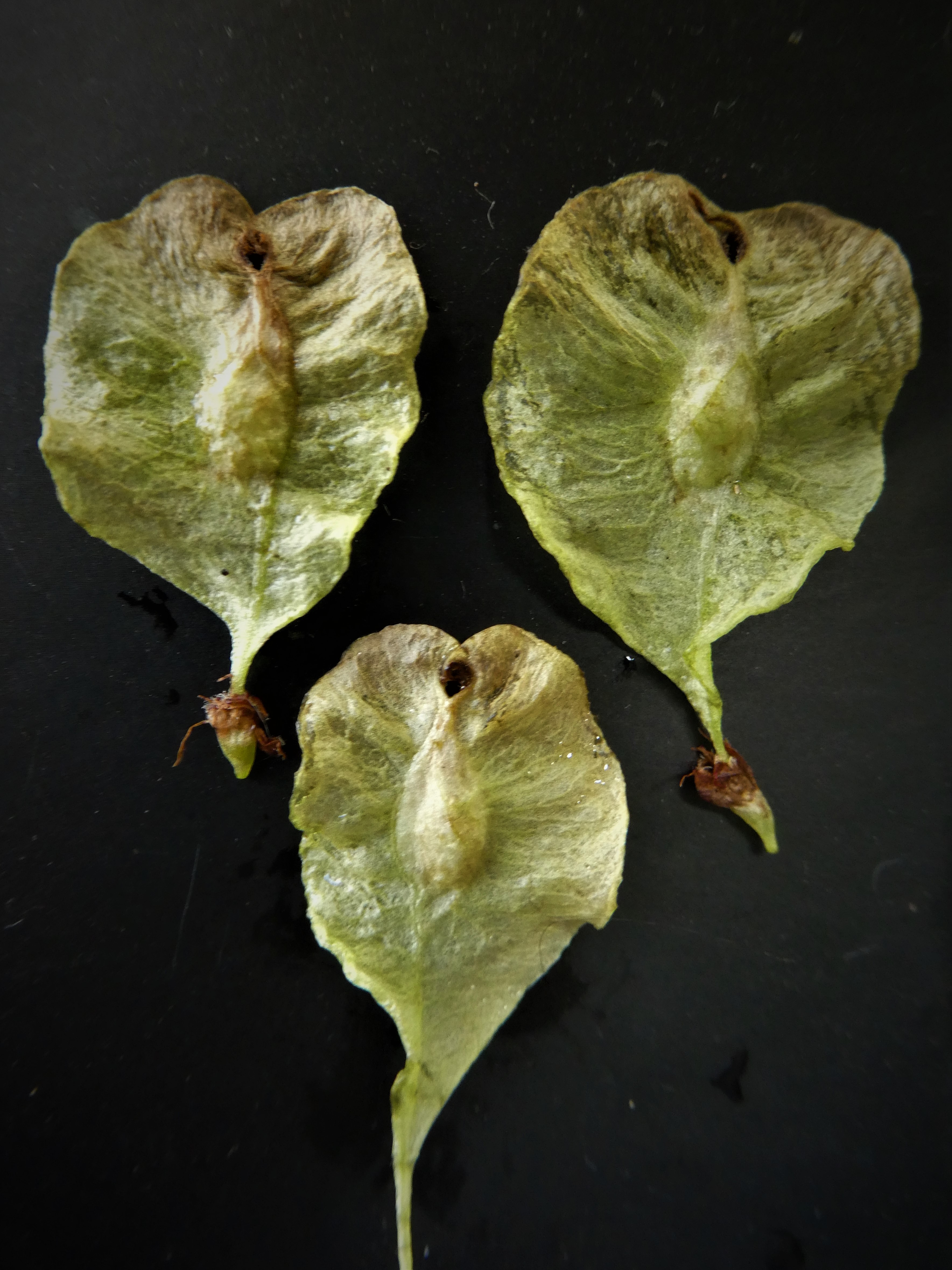
Samarae

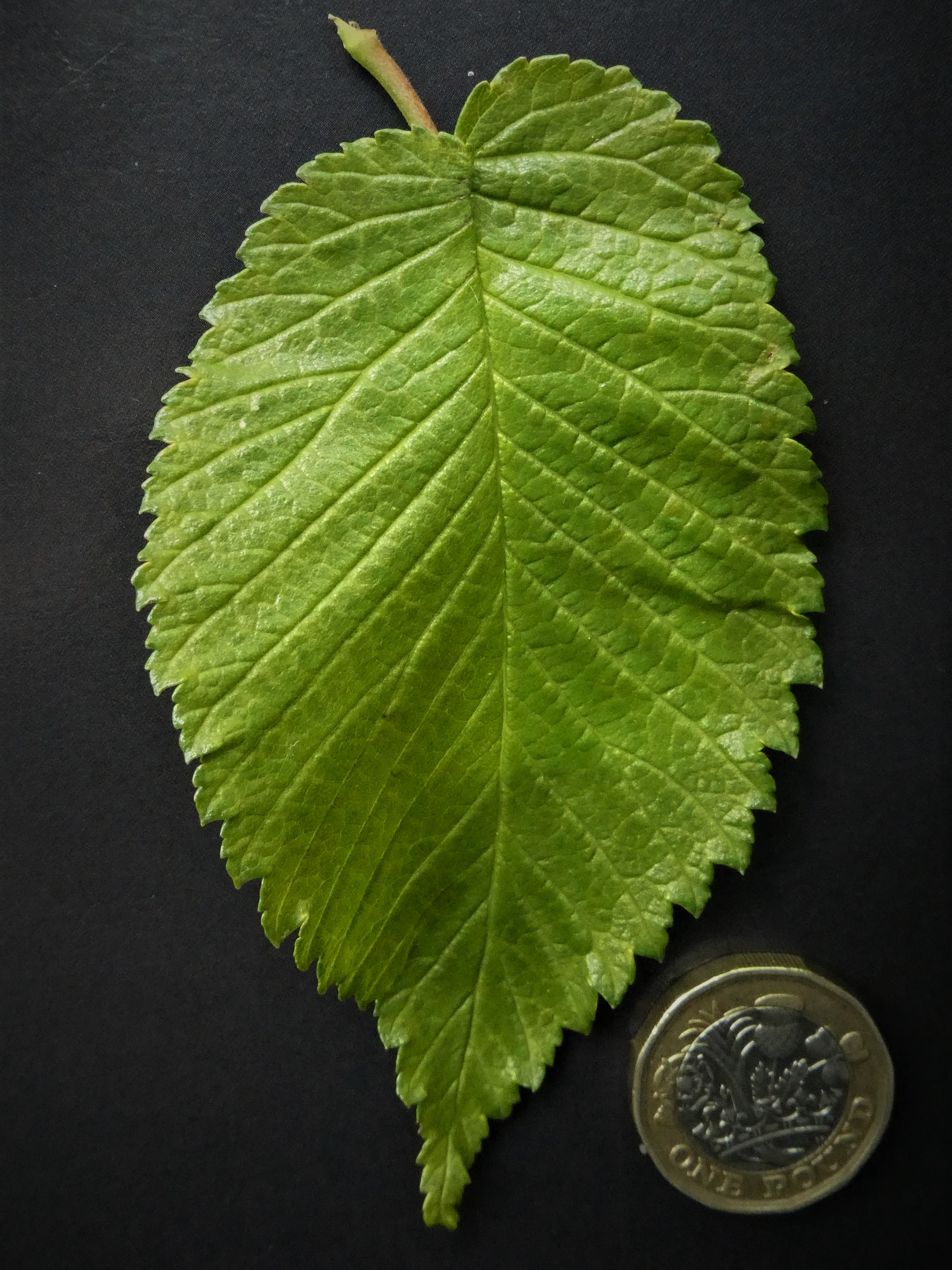
Leaf with £1 coin

== Pests and diseases ==
Tested by inoculation with unnaturally high concentrations of the Ophiostoma novo-ulmi pathogen, 'Wingham' displayed an extraordinary resistance ('5 out of 5'), exhibiting defoliation of just 1.44%, with 0% dieback, one of the highest of all the 1000+ clones raised by IPP, Italy.

== Cultivation ==
'Wingham' has excelled in the UK where planted on fertile alluvium in river valleys, but has struggled on poorer chalk and clay soils, emulating the 'English' Elm U. minor 'Atinia'. At the Castellaccio trials site in Italy, specimens increased in height by up to 1.94 m (6 ft 4 in) per annum, with a commensurate increase in bole girth of 2.84 cm (1.12 in). Among urban plantings in the UK are two specimens in Regent Road Park, Edinburgh, planted in 2019, and three, planted in 2014, in central Broad Walk, Christ Church Meadow, Oxford. The clone is not known elsewhere beyond Italy in continental Europe, and has not been introduced to North America or Australasia.

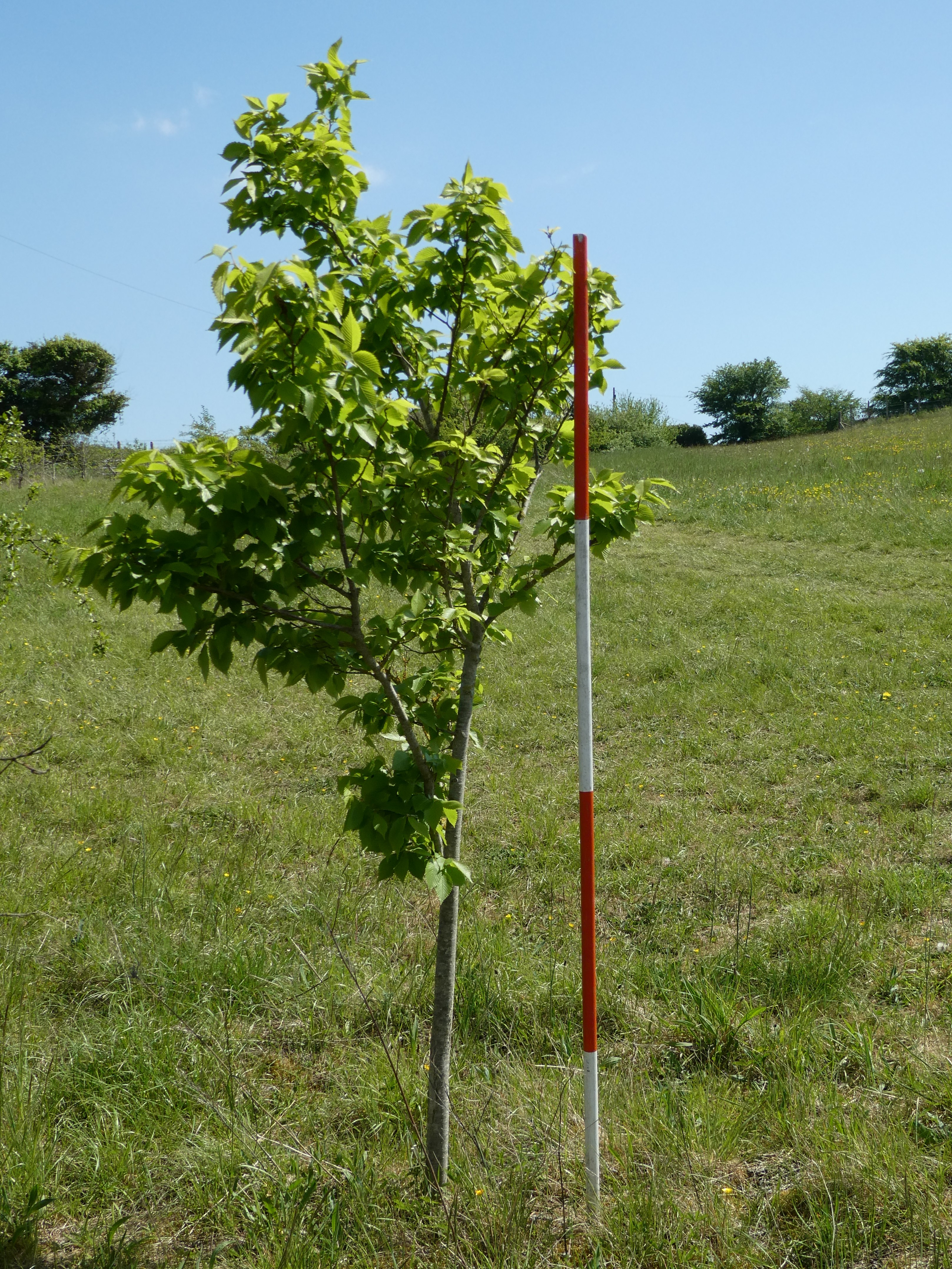
'Wingham' poor growth on chalk, 2 m (6 ft 7 in) in 10 years

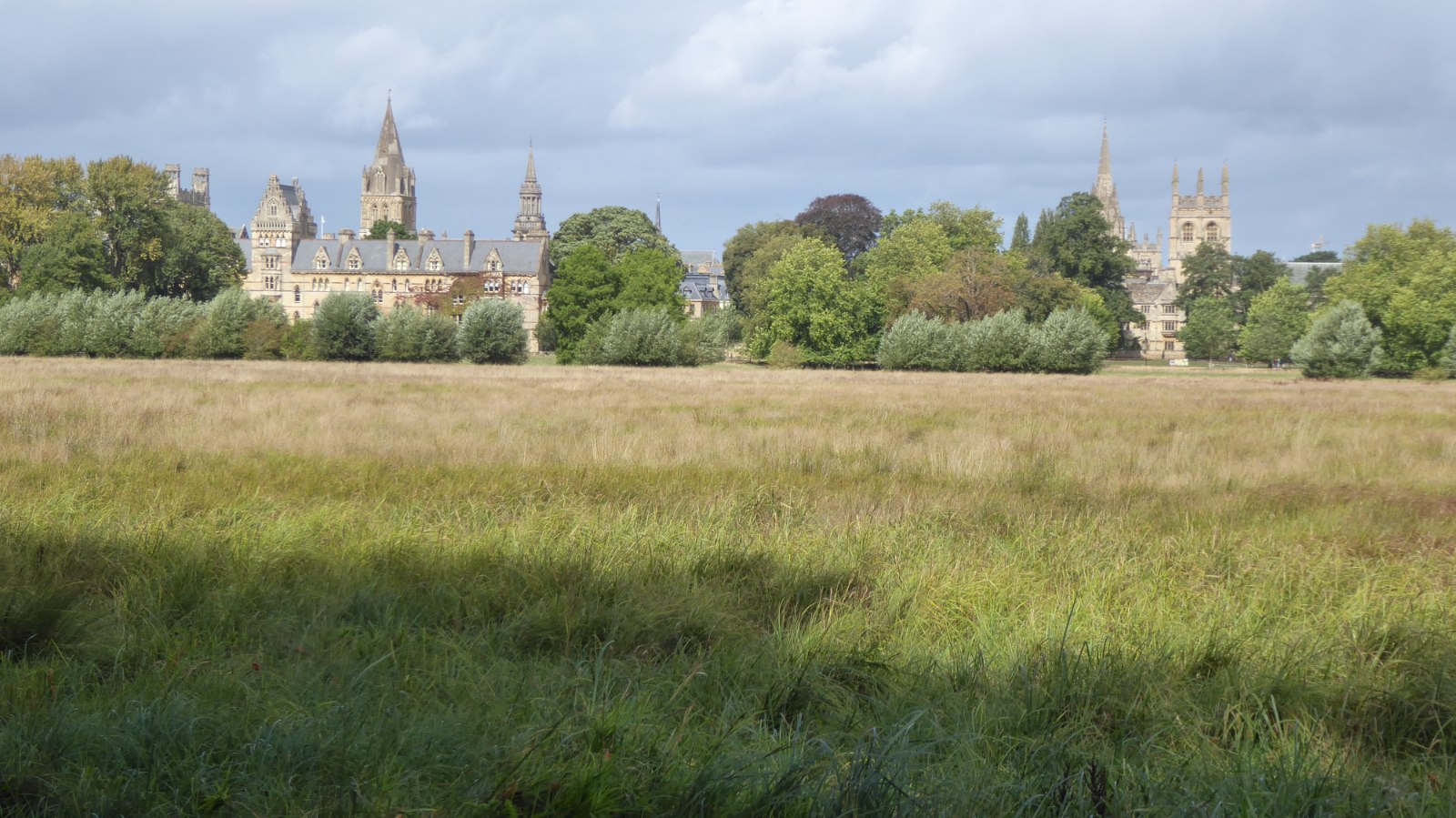
Three fast-growing 'Wingham' on clay soil (to right of Merton College windows), Christ Church Meadow, Oxford (2025)

== Etymology ==
'Wingham' is named for the village in Kent where the tree was successfully trialled.

== Hybrids ==
'Wingham', while still unnamed clone FL493, was crossed c.2015, as female parent, with old field elms surviving near Tonge Mill, Sittingbourne, Kent. Four inoculated seedlings "proved asymptomatic or had 2% or less of wilting", a result described in 2019 as "significant ... as it means British-bred elm seedlings with very high tolerance or resistance have for the first time been identified". Kew described these clones, propagated and planted on a trial site in Wateringbury, as "promising" (2024).

== Accessions ==
=== Europe ===
- Grange Farm Arboretum, Sutton St James, Spalding, Lincs., UK. Acc. no. 1260
- Icomb Place, Icomb, Gloucestershire, Elm trials, planted 2014
- Royal Botanic Garden Edinburgh. Acc. no. 20151813

== Nurseries ==
- Frank P. Matthews Ltd., Tenbury Wells, Worcs., UK
