= Timeline of prehistoric Scotland =

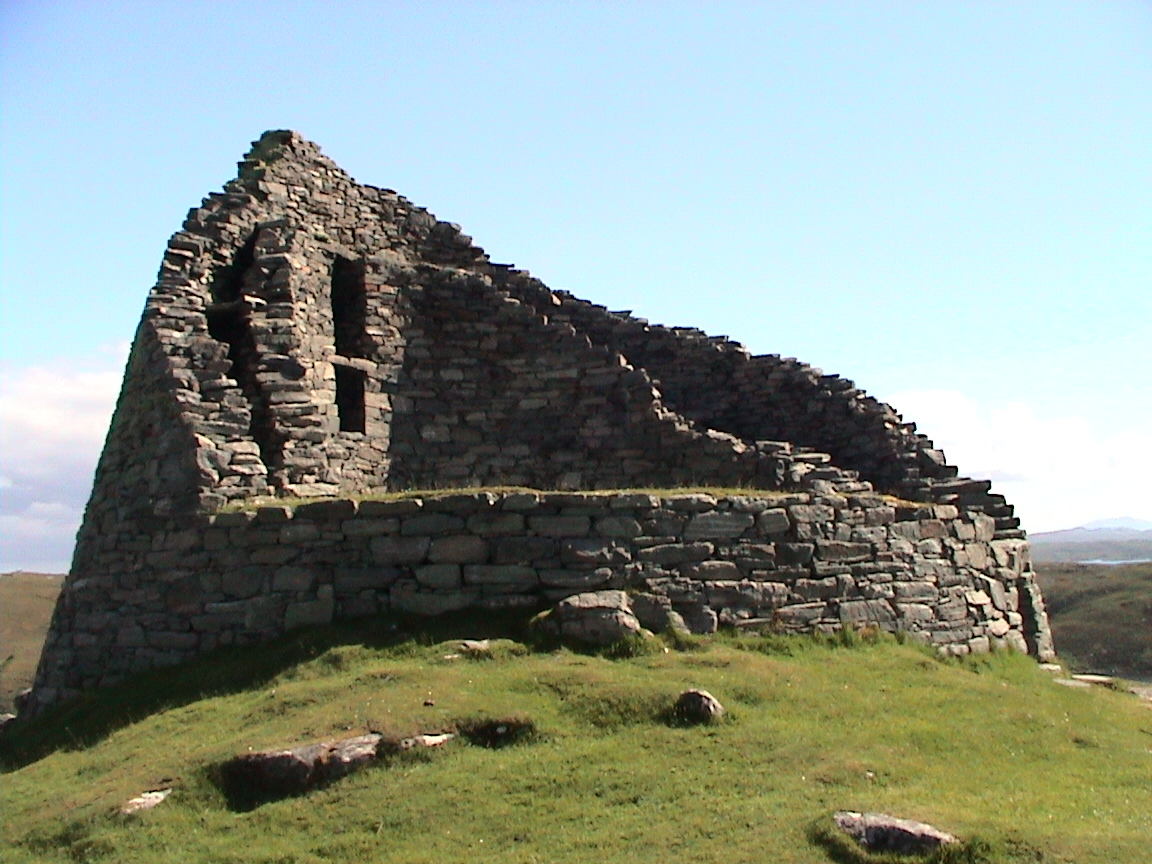
The ruins of Dun Carloway Iron Age broch

This timeline of prehistoric Scotland is a chronologically ordered list of important archaeological sites in Scotland and of major events affecting Scotland's human inhabitants and culture during the prehistoric period. The period of prehistory prior to occupation by the genus Homo is part of the geology of Scotland. Prehistory in Scotland ends with the arrival of the Romans in southern Scotland in the 1st century AD and the beginning of written records. The archaeological sites and events listed are the earliest examples or among the most notable of their type.

No traces have yet been found of either a Neanderthal presence or of Homo sapiens during the Pleistocene interglacials, the first indications of humans in Scotland occurring only after the ice retreated in the 11th millennium BC. Since that time, the landscape of Scotland has been altered dramatically by both human and natural forces. Initially, sea levels were lower than at present due to the large volume of ice that remained. This meant that the Orkney archipelago and many of the Inner Hebridean islands were attached to the mainland, as was the present-day island of Great Britain to Continental Europe. Much of the present-day North Sea was also dry land until after 4000 BC. Dogger Bank, for example was part of a large peninsula connected to the European continent. This would have made travel to western and northern Scotland relatively easy for early human settlers. The subsequent isostatic rise of land makes estimating post-glacial coastlines a complex task and there are numerous raised beaches around Scotland's coastline.

Many of the sites are located in the Highlands and Islands. This may be because of the relatively sparse modern populations and consequent lack of disturbance. Much of the area also has a thick covering of peat that preserves stone fragments, although the associated acidic conditions tend to dissolve organic materials. There are also numerous important remains in the Orkney archipelago, where sand and arable land predominate. Local tradition hints at both a fear and veneration of these ancient structures that may have helped to preserve their integrity.

Differentiating the various periods of human history involved is a complex task. The Paleolithic lasted until the retreat of the ice, the Mesolithic until the adoption of farming and the Neolithic until metalworking commenced. These events may have begun at different times in different parts of the country. A number of the sites span very long periods of time and in particular, the distinctions between the Neolithic and the later periods are not clear cut.

== Timeline ==
Key to predominant "Type":

Letter	Type	Description
(B)	Bone	Human or animal material including bone, teeth and shells examined using zooarchaeological techniques.
(E)	Environmental	Natural occurrences including geological and climatic events.
(F)	Building foundations	Disturbed ground, timber remains or worked stone.
(M)	Metal	Metals worked by humans into tools, jewellery etc.
(O)	Organic material	Biofacts – the dead material of once-living organisms.
(P)	Pottery	Usually shards of broken pot – complete artefacts only rarely.
(S)	Stone	Stone tools, stone used as a building material, standing stones, or natural stone features.

Citations in the Type box refer to the information in the entire row.

=== Palaeolithic ===
The whole of Scotland was covered in ice sheets during the coldest periods of the Quaternary glaciation and most of Scotland remained glaciated when the cave paintings of Lascaux in France were created, c. 14,000 BC. Humans began to populate Scotland during the current Flandrian interglacial but settlement began much later than in southern Europe due to the adverse climatic conditions further north. So far, a single site has produced the only definite evidence of Upper Paleolithic human habitation in Scotland.

Date (BC)	Location	Details	Type
12,000	Biggar	Flint artefacts found at Howburn Farm, near Elsrickle in 2005 but not dated until 2009.	(S)
c. 10,000	Islay	Stone implements of the Ahrensburgian culture found at Rubha Port an t-Seilich near Port Askaig by foraging pigs in 2015 near a Mesolithic site. Probably a summer camp used by hunters travelling round the coast in boats.	(S)

=== Mesolithic ===
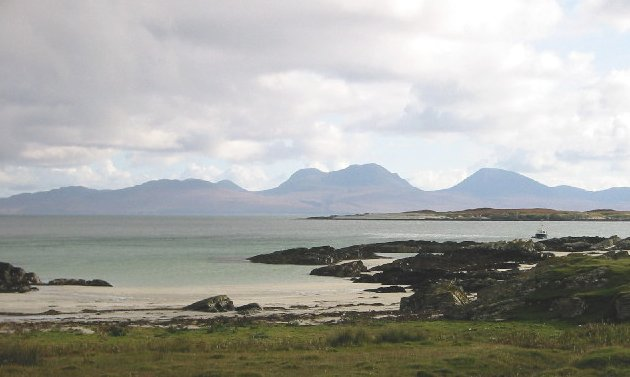
A beach on Oronsay, looking towards Jura. Both islands have produced evidence of Mesolithic human settlement.

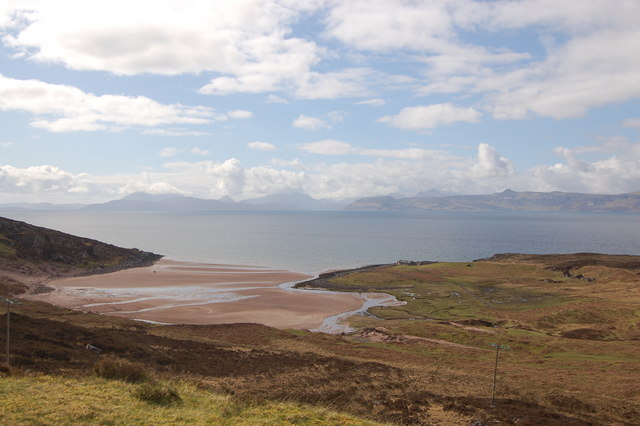
Sand Bay and the Inner Sound. The rock-shelter at Sand is an important Mesolithic site.

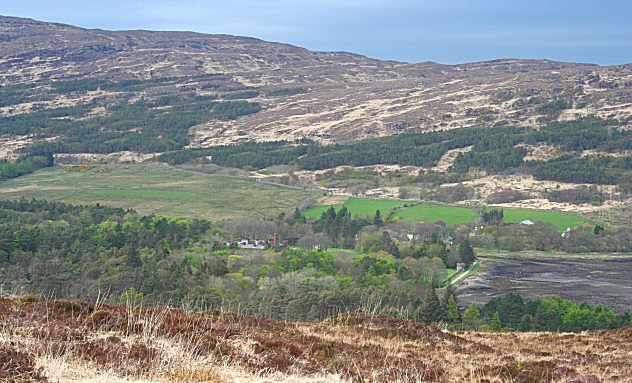
Kinloch at the head of Loch Scresort, Rùm. This area has provided two early Mesolithic sites.

The Mesolithic period in Scotland is characterised by rich assemblages of lithic artefacts that indicate the presence of hunter-gatherer communities, most commonly identified by a narrow blade technology and its characteristic microliths. Most common raw material is flint beach pebbles, however, a variety of other types of geology, usually from local sources, is represented. Although stone tools and their production waste represent the vast majority of archaeological evidence form this period, Mesolithic material culture would have been dominated by organic materials (plant and animal materials) that require anaerobic preservation conditions to prevent decomposition (i.e. permafrost, peat bogs, etc.). Organic artefacts cannot survive in acidic soils of Scotland. However, Mesolithic bone artefacts have been found, surviving due to favourable preservation conditions – most are associated with the Obanian tradition. Other common organic finds are shell middens, including mollusc and fish bones, and charred remains, including hearths and hazelnut shells that can provide radiocarbon dates. Most prolific Mesolithic sites are discovered in coastal landscapes, however, this may be a result of research and recovery bias. No Mesolithic burial sites have been uncovered in Scotland to date. However, human remains have been discovered in the Oronsay middens. Additionally, a handful of Mesolithic dwelling sites have been discovered.

Date (BC)	Location	Details	Type
10,800	Islay	A flint arrowhead that was found in a field near Bridgend. This may relate to the end of the Allerød, a relatively warm period that lasted from c. 12,000 to 11,000 BC. This is the only find in Scotland to date from this early part of the Mesolithic.	(S)
11,000–9640	Scotland-wide	The Loch Lomond Stadial cold period. No evidence has been found yet of human activity in Scotland during this time.	(E)
8500	Cramond	The remains of a temporary camp that has provided more than 3,000 artefacts, including about 300 stone tools and fragments.	(O, S)
8240	South Queensferry	The outline of Scotland's "oldest house" is an oval about 7 metres (23 ft) across discovered in 2012. It was probably occupied during the winter months.	(O, F, S)
8000	Aberdeenshire	Possibly the world's oldest calendar, discovered at Warren Field in 2004 from aerial photographs.	F)
7700–7500	Rùm	Burnt hazelnut shells and microscopic charcoal found at Farm Fields, Kinloch indicate a settlement of some kind. This was considered to be the oldest evidence of occupation in Scotland until the confirmation of the Cramond site in 2001.	(O)
7500 and 5500	Applecross	A shell midden and rock-shelter at Sand in Wester Ross. The Inner Sound and its environs surrounding the island of Raasay are the focus of investigations researching Scotland's early Mesolithic settlers. The two dates for Sand suggest an intermediary period of abandonment.	(B, S)
6700	Colonsay	A midden pit containing hundreds of thousands of charred hazelnut shells, all harvested in the same year, on a raised beach at Staosnaig. Nearby, smaller pits were used for roasting.	(O)
6500	Skye	A rock shelter and midden site at An Corran in Staffin, probably related to Sand.	(O, S)
6500	Islay	Stone artefacts including 250,000 flints at Bolsay.	(S)
6500–5500	Rùm	A beach site above Loch Scresort with stakeholes suggesting tent-like structures.	(F, O)
6000	Jura	Three stone hearths and traces of red ochre, which are the earliest dated stone-built structures found so far.	(S)
6000	Coastal inundations	The Storegga Slides created a tsunami that reached 25 metres (82 feet) above normal high tides. Evidence of widespread coastal inundations has been found, especially in the north and east.	(E)
5300–4300	Oronsay	Five middens containing huge quantities of seashells, with some fish bones, antler and human remains. The middens appear to have been filled according to a seasonal rhythm.	(B)

=== Neolithic ===
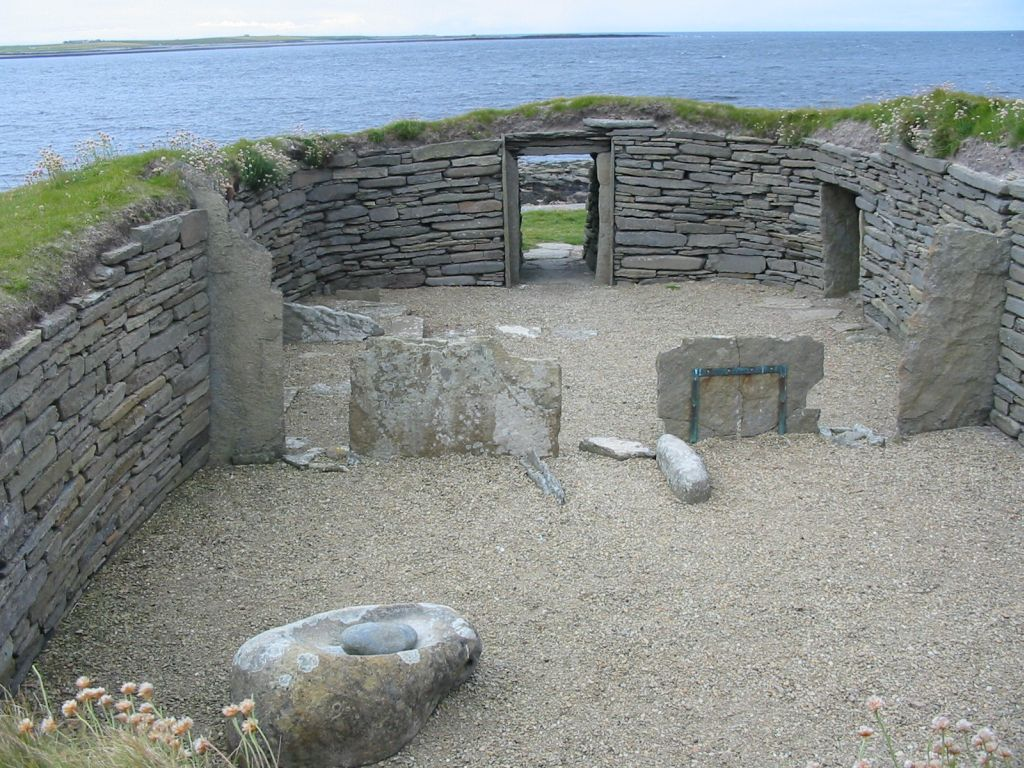
Knap of Howar. The site contains what is probably the oldest preserved house in northern Europe.

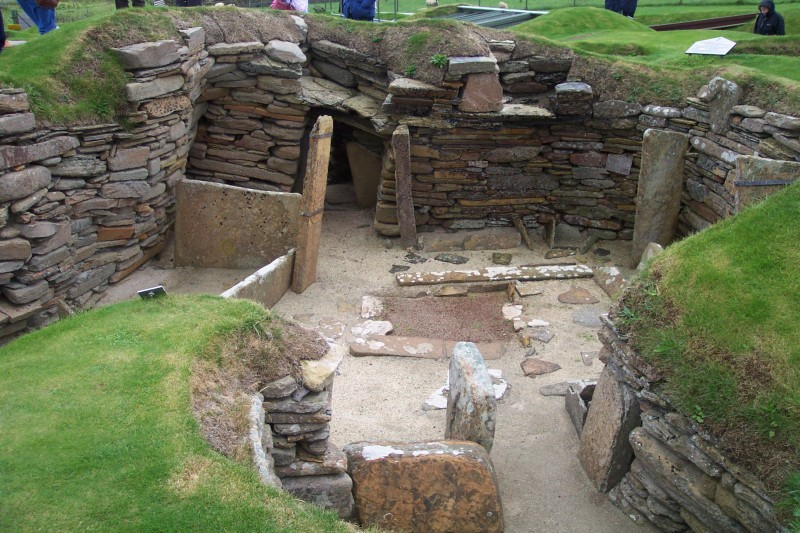
Skara Brae in Orkney is Europe's most complete Neolithic village.

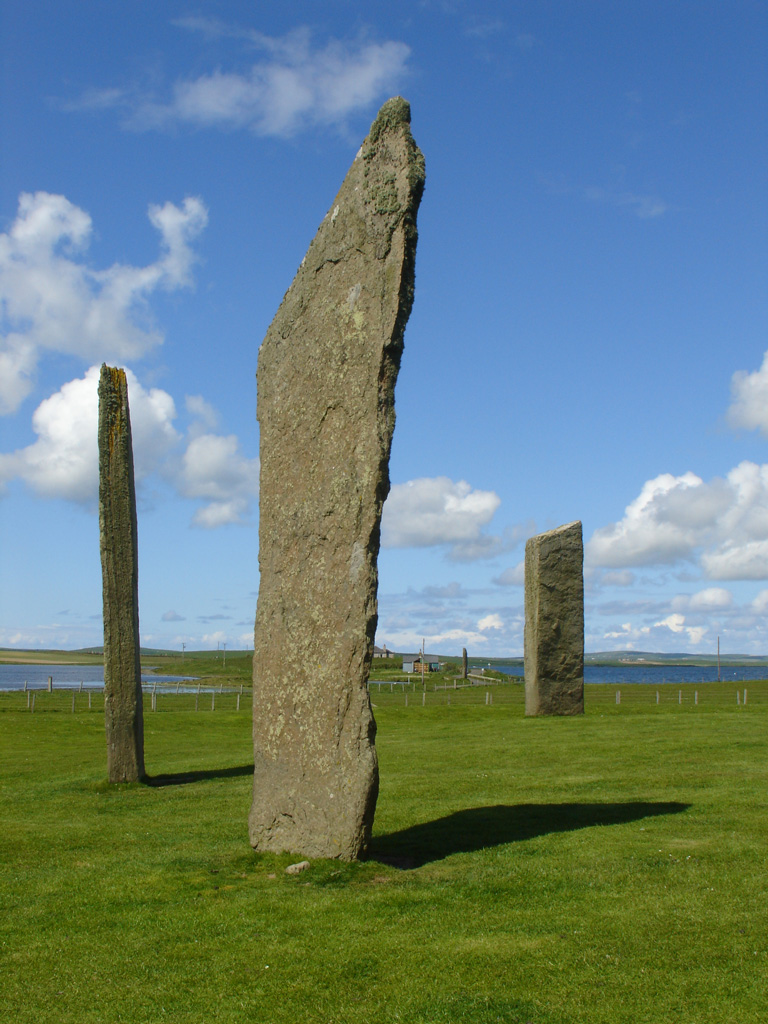
The Standing Stones of Stenness, Orkney

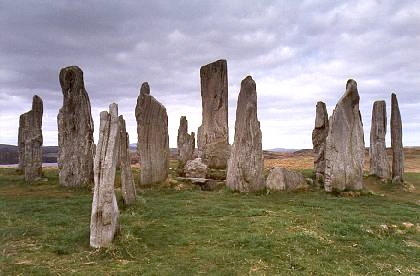
Callanish Stones – one of the finest stone circles in Scotland

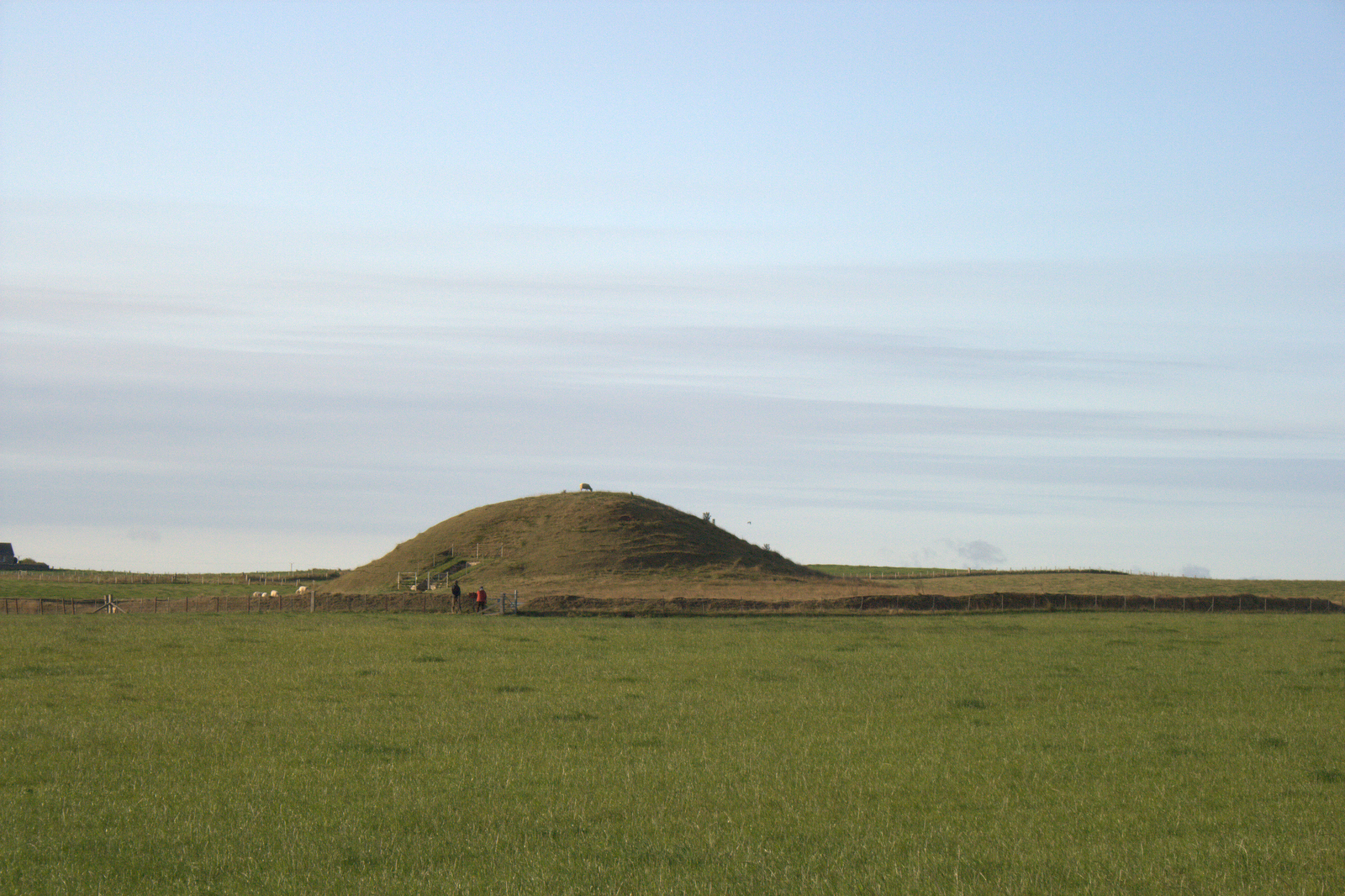
Maeshowe chambered cairn, Orkney

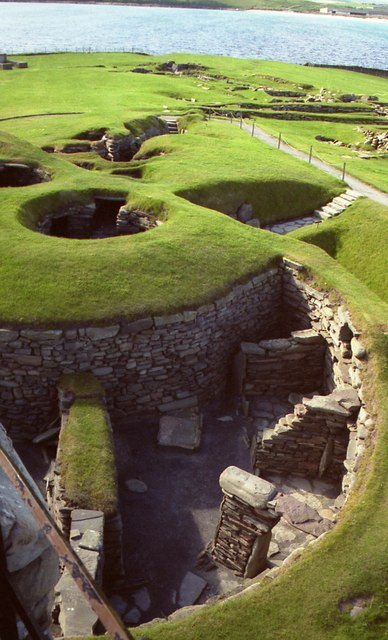
Jarlshof, Shetland, re-discovered in the late nineteenth century

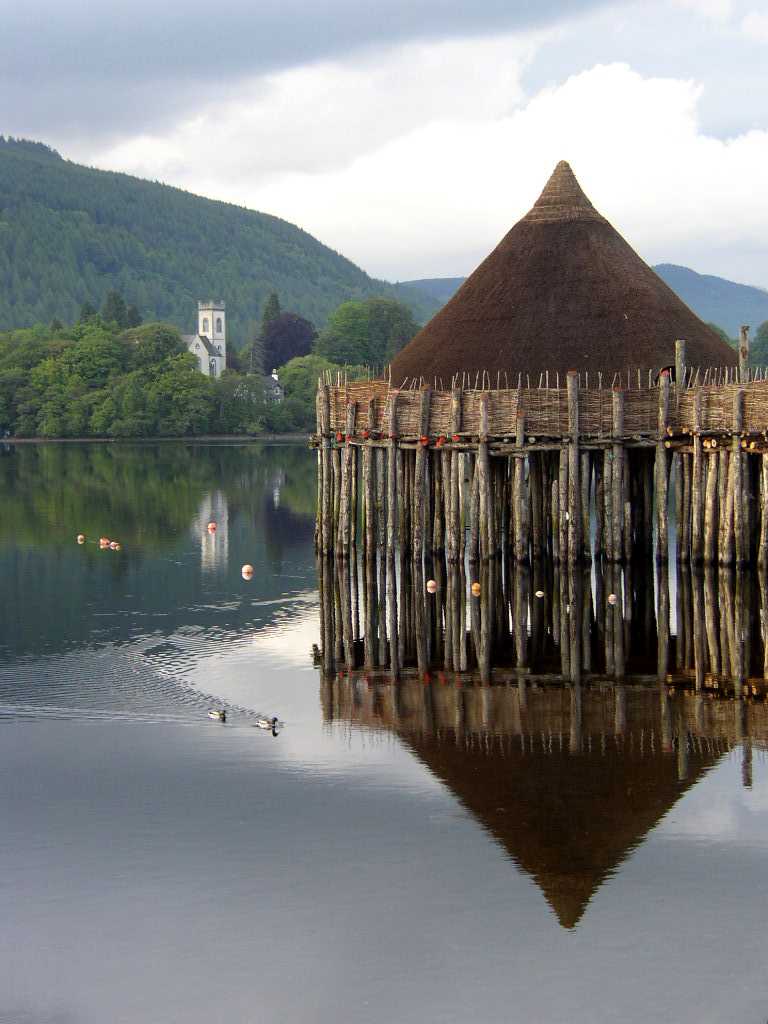
Reconstructed crannog on Loch Tay

Scotland's Neolithic discoveries portray a radical departure from the earlier hunter-gatherer societies. During this period, complex societies evolve that are capable of creating substantial structures. Development is by no means linear and architectural advances are often followed by periods of stagnation and even reversal. The Balbridie site, for example, is matched by only two others so far discovered in Scotland at Kelso and in the Forth Valley and they are quite dissimilar from both anything found earlier and the monumental stone structures found later. No timber buildings of a similar size were re-created until the Saxon invasions some four millennia later. The great Orcadian Neolithic monuments were constructed contemporaneously with the emergence of the Ancient Egyptian culture, more than 500 years before the building of the Great Pyramid of Giza and almost a millennium before the sarsen stones of Stonehenge were erected.

Date (BC)	Location	Details	Type
3900–3200	Aberdeenshire	Balbridie timber hall. This structure is 26 metres long and 13 metres wide (85 ft by 43 ft) and may have had a roof 10 metres (33 feet) high. It was large enough to accommodate up to 50 people. Braeroddach Loch nearby provides the earliest evidence for pastoralism found so far, dated to 3780.	(F, O)
3700–2800	Papa Westray	Knap of Howar Neolithic farmstead, probably the oldest preserved house in northern Europe, in which Unstan pottery pieces were found. The structure was inhabited for 900 years.	(P, S)
3600	Meikleour	Cleaven Dyke cursus, a structure that is unique in a Scottish context, and Herald Hill long barrow.	(S)
3500–2500	West Lothian	Excavations at Cairnpapple Hill have unearthed pottery bowls and stone axe heads that indicate rituals in the early period of occupation. A major henge was constructed a millennium later. (See also Bronze Age below.)	(P, S)
3500–2000	Orkney	A site excavated at Ness of Brodgar from 2003 near Loch of Harray has provided evidence of housing, decorated stone slabs, a massive stone wall with foundations 4 metres (13 ft) wide, and a large building 25 metres (82 ft) long and 20 metres (66 ft) wide described as a Neolithic "cathedral".	(P, S)
3400	Shetland	The Scord of Brouster site in Walls includes a cluster of six or seven walled fields and three stone circular houses that contains the earliest hoe-blades found so far in Scotland.	(S)
3200–2800	North Uist	Eilean Dòmhnuill in Loch Olabhat may be Scotland's earliest crannog. The final phase bears a resemblance to Knap of Howar.	(P, S)
3200–2950	Orkney	The Barnhouse Settlement, another cluster of buildings including one that may have been used for communal gatherings.	(S)
3100–2500	Orkney	Skara Brae consists of ten clustered houses and is Northern Europe's most complete Neolithic village.	(O, S)
3150	South Ronaldsay	The Tomb of the Eagles where 16,000 human bones were found, as well as 725 bird bones, predominantly white-tailed sea eagle. This chambered tomb was in use for 800 years or more, and is considered by archaeologists to be one of the finest of its kind in the north of Scotland.	(B, S)
3100	Orkney	The Stones of Stenness are four remaining megaliths of a henge, the largest of which is 5 metres (16 feet) high.	(S)
3000	Argyll	Kilmartin Glen contains 350 Neolithic and Bronze Age relics within a 10-kilometre (6.2 mi) radius, including Dunadd hill fort.	(S)
3000?	Hirta	Shards of pottery of the Hebridean Ware style and a quarry for stone tools discovered on the hillside of Mullach Sgar. Stone hoe-blades, grinders and Skaill knives found in the Village Bay bee-hive shaped storage cleitean. Uncertain date between 3500 and 1500 BC.	(P, S)
3000–2500	Westray	At Links of Noltland a lozenge-shaped figurine was discovered in 2009, which may have been carved between 3000 and 2500 BC and is the earliest representation of a human face ever found in Scotland. Known as the Westray Wife, the face has two dots for eyes, heavy brows and an oblong nose and a pattern of hatches on the body could represent clothing.	(S)
2900–2600	Lewis	The Callanish Stones are one of the finest stone circles in Scotland. The 13 primary monoliths of between one and five metres in height form a circle about 13 metres in diameter.	(S)
2700	Orkney	Maeshowe, a large and unique chambered cairn and passage grave, aligned so that its central chamber is illuminated on the winter solstice. It was looted by Vikings who left one of the largest collection of runic inscriptions in the world.	(S)
2500	Shetland	Jarlshof is the best known archaeological site in Shetland. The earliest finds are pottery from this era, although the main settlement dates from the Bronze Age (see below). A site nearby has been dated to 3200 BC.	(P)
2500	Orkney	Ring of Brodgar, a stone circle 104 metres in diameter, originally composed of 60 stones set within a circular ditch up to 3 metres deep and 10 metres wide. It has been estimated that the structure took 80,000 man-hours to construct.	(S)
2500?	Hoy	The Dwarfie Stane tomb, made from a single huge block of red sandstone with a hollowed-out central chamber. This style is quite unlike any other Neolithic Orkney site.	(S)
2460	Rùm	The earliest evidence of tree clearance and of arable cultivation recovered from a peat core taken near Kinloch.	(O)

=== Bronze and Iron Ages ===
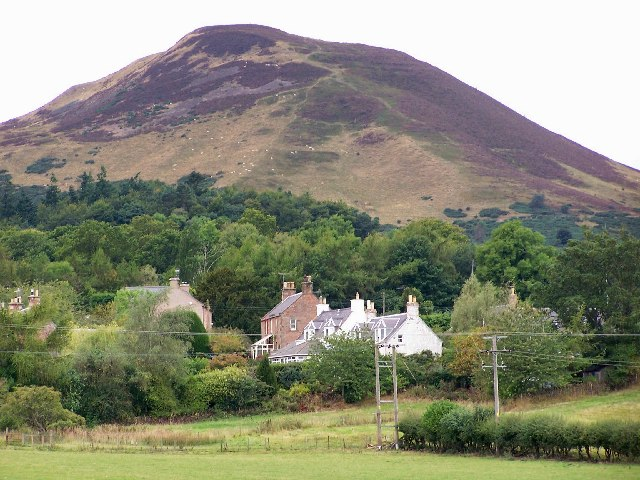
Eildon Hill – a triple peak and hill fort

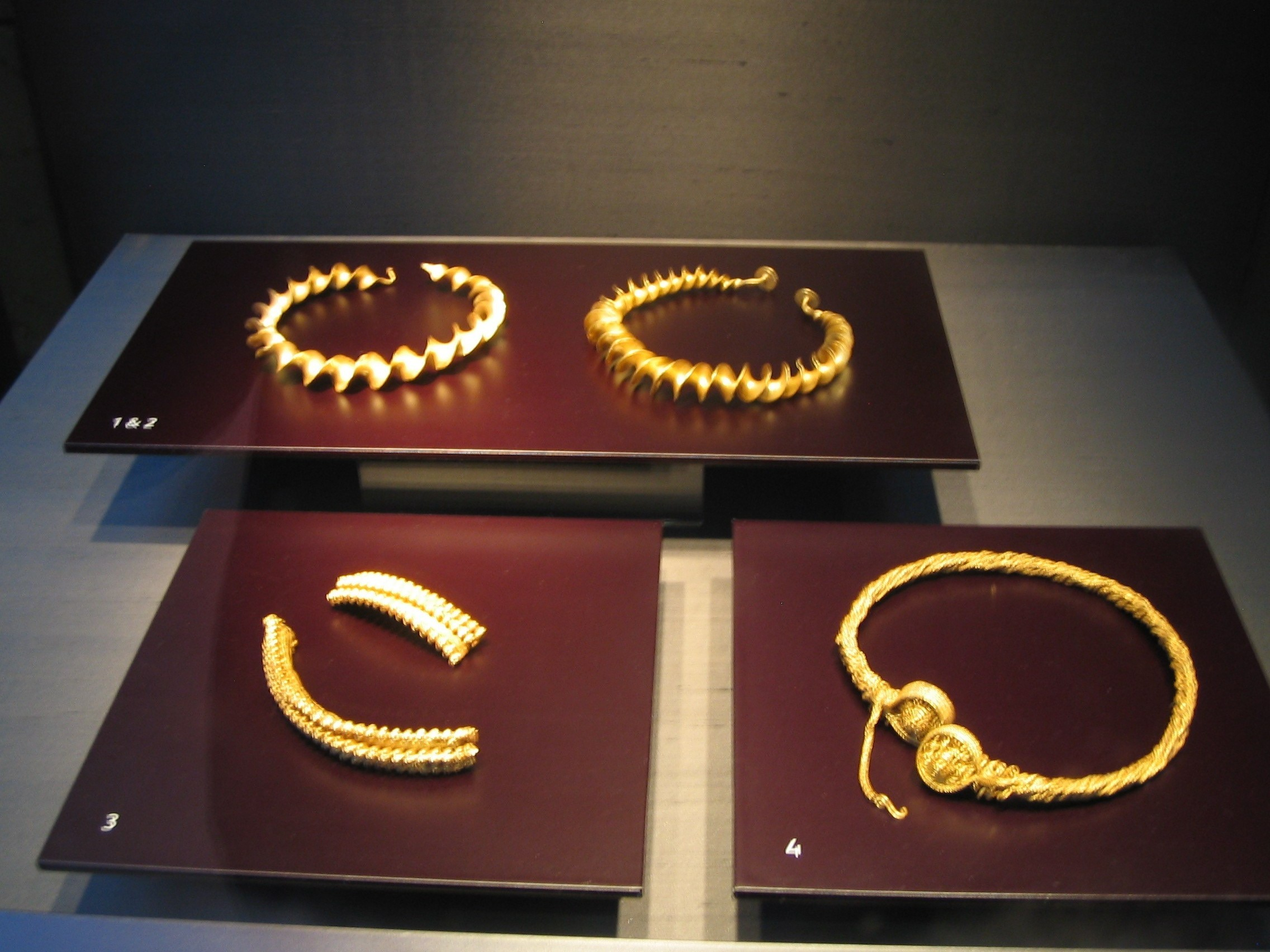
The four torcs in the Stirling hoard

From the commencement of the Bronze Age to about 2000 BC, the archaeological record shows a decline in the number of large new stone buildings constructed. Pollen analyses suggest that at this time woodland increased at the expense of the area under cultivation. In Orkney, burials were now being made in small cists well away from the great megalithic sites and a new Beaker culture began to dominate. Bronze and Iron Age metalworking was slowly introduced to Scotland from Europe over a lengthy period. (By contrast, the Neolithic monumental culture spread south from northern Scotland into England.) As the Bronze Age developed, Scotland's population grew to perhaps 300,000 in the second millennium BC. There were evidently significant differences between the lifestyles of Bronze Age peoples inhabiting Scotland. For example, finds at the Traprain Law site (near modern Edinburgh) suggest that the priests there may have overseen ceremonies on a par with their contemporaries on mainland Europe. On the other hand, although the mummifications found at Cladh Hallan in the Western Isles invite comparisons with Egypt, the simple lifestyle of the inhabitants of this settlement contrasts with that of Tutankamun.

During the 1st millennium BC as the Iron Age emerged from the preceding Bronze Age, it becomes legitimate to talk of a Celtic culture in Scotland, although the nature of the resident Pictish civilisation and their immediate predecessors remains enigmatic. The Stirling hoard was found by a metal detectorist in September 2009. It has been described as the most significant discovery of Iron Age metalwork in Scotland and is said to be of international significance.

Date (BC)	Location	Details	Type
2250–1950	Sutherland	The Migdale Hoard is an early Bronze Age find at Skibo Castle that includes two bronze axes, several pairs of armlets and anklets, a necklace of forty bronze beads, ear pendants and bosses of bronze and jet buttons.	(M)
2000	West Lothian	Further to Neolithic developments at Cairnpapple Hill (see above) finds from later dates include Beaker style pottery from 2000 BC, burial cists and graves from the Iron Age or possibly the Christian era.	(P, S)
2000	Forteviot	A Bronze Age tomb with burial treasures including the remains of an Early Bronze Age ruler laid out on white quartz pebbles and birch bark, with possessions including a bronze and gold dagger, a wooden bowl and a leather bag.	(M, S)
2000	Nairn	The Clava cairns of Balnuaran are three substantial circular chamber tombs surrounded by a "kerb" ring of boulders. They are the best examples of a group of 45 such cairns found in Inverness-shire.	(S)
2000	Inverness	A burial cist at Culduthel provided barbed arrowheads and an archer's wristguard studded with gold rivets.	(M, S)
2000	Argyll	Rock art found in the Achnabreac forest near Lochgilphead includes some of the largest ring marks in Britain. It is likely that the site is connected with nearby Kilmartin Glen, suggesting a millennium-long use of the latter.	(S)
1600–1100	South Uist	Cladh Hallan, the only site in the UK where prehistoric mummies have been found.	(O, S)
1500? – 200	Aberdeenshire	Bennachie, a prominent hill with Bronze and Iron Age remains, including a 20-metre (66-foot) diameter roundhouse.	(S)
1500 BC – 150 AD	East Lothian	Traprain Law, a hill fort and burial site that covered up to 16 hectares (40 acres) and was a seat of Votadini power.	(M, S)
1255	Forth Valley	A tripartite wooden disc-wheel found at Blair Drummond Moss are the earliest evidence for wheeled transport in Britain.	(O)
1159±	Iceland	An eruption of the Hekla volcano caused a significant deterioration in growing conditions and may have halved the Bronze Age population. Production of tools declined thereafter but weapons were made in greater numbers, suggesting a period of considerable unrest.	(E)
1000	Melrose	The fort on the summit of Eildon Hill has 5 km (3.1 mi) of ramparts and could have had an occasional population of 3000 to 6000.	(O)
1st millennium BC	Skye	The remains of Dun Ringill fort are similar in layout to that of both a broch and a complex Atlantic roundhouse.	(S)
800 BC onwards	Shetland	The main settlement of Jarlshof includes a smithy, a cluster of wheelhouses and a later broch. The site was inhabited until Viking times.	(P, S)
800	Perthshire	A hoard of bronze objects found in a peat bog at Corrymuckloch including three axeheads a sword blade and a large ladle. The ladle is unique in a British context.	(M)
700–500	Argyll	The "Ballachulish Goddess" or Ballachulish figure – a life-sized female figure in alder (thought to be oak at the time of discovery) with quartz pebbles for eyes found under a wicker structure beneath peat at Ballachulish. The high standard of preservation suggests it was deliberately submerged.	(O)
600?	Ross-shire	Dun an Ruigh Ruaidh on the south west shore of Loch Broom is an early example of a complex Atlantic roundhouse from which the later brochs may have developed.	(S)
400	Edinburgh	A chariot burial found at Newbridge in 2001, the first such find in Scotland.	(M)
300	Skye	The remains of the bridge of a lyre found at High Pasture Cave. This small burnt and broken piece is the earliest find of a stringed instrument in western Europe.	(W)
200	Kirkcudbright	The Torrs Pony-cap and Horns, three enigmatic pieces of bronzework, all with sophisticated decoration in Celtic (Insular La Tène) style, from about 200 BC.	(M)
100?	Mousa	Broch of Mousa built during the final period of broch building, it stands some 13 m (43 ft) high and is the finest extant example of these structures, which are unique to the north and west of Scotland. Dun Carloway broch on Lewis is also well preserved and dates from a similar period.	(S)
100	Stirling	The Stirling hoard, consisting of four gold torcs, a type of necklace, all of which were manufactured between 300 BC and 100 BC. They were evidently buried deliberately at some point in antiquity.	(M)

== Sites of uncertain date ==
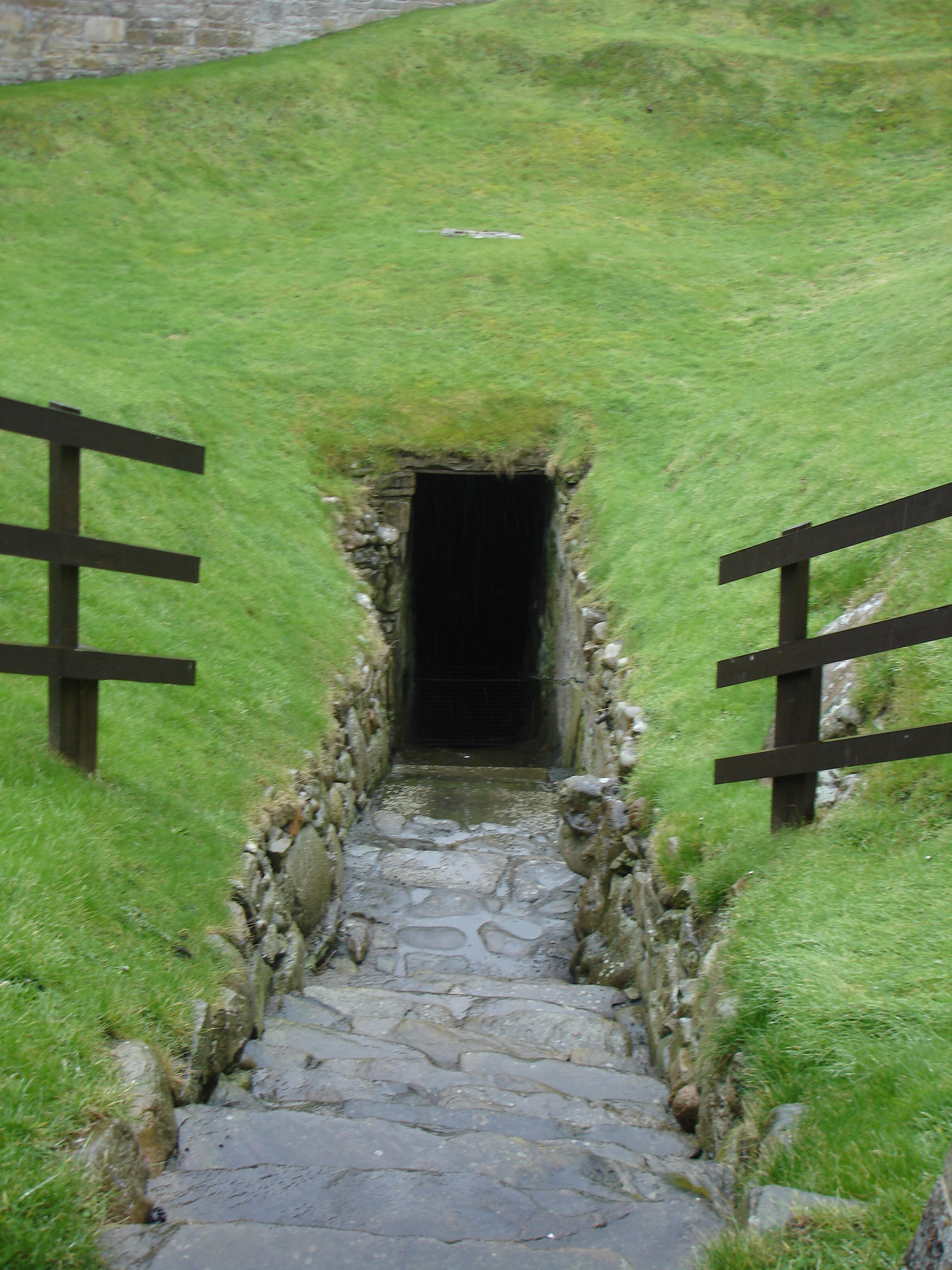
Burghead chambered well

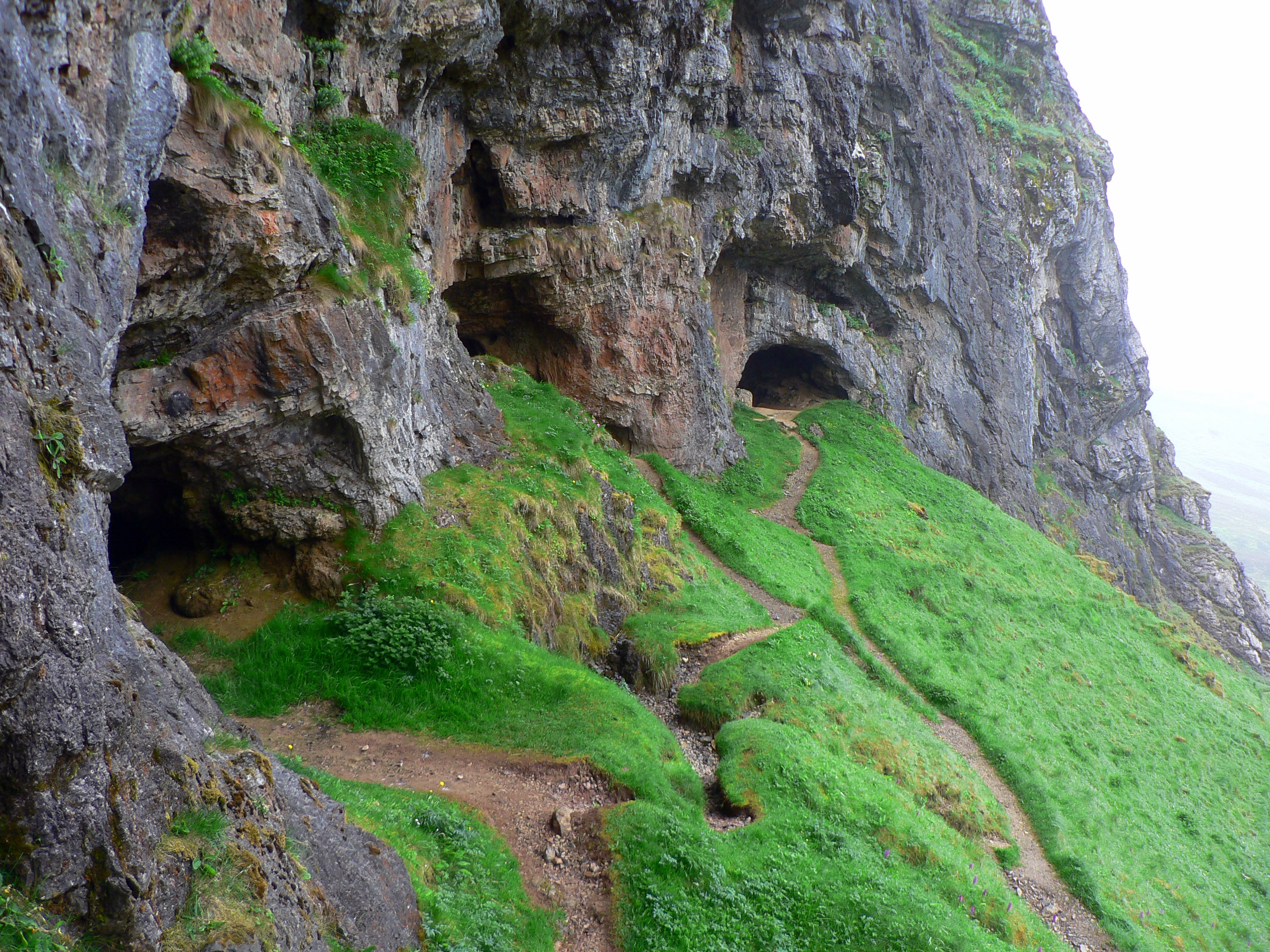
Inchnadamph Caves

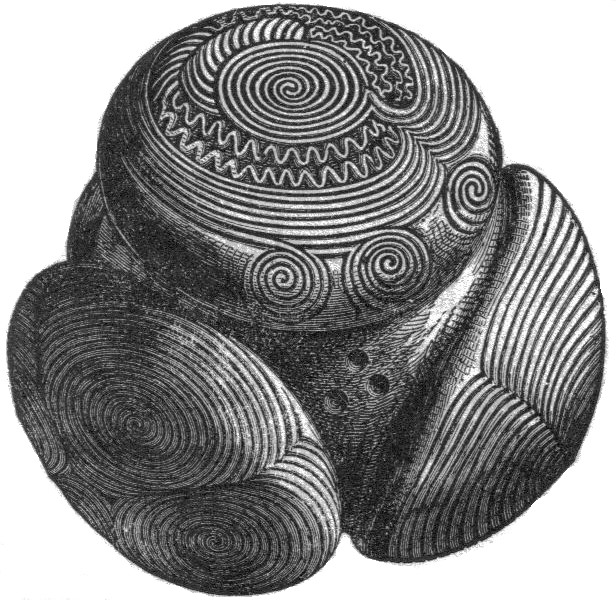
An example of a carved stone ball from Towie in Aberdeenshire, dated from 3200 to 2500 BC.

Various sites of importance are as yet undated and difficult to place in the timeline. Others contain items from many different periods whose story has not yet been unraveled or items where the time period and location cannot be easily reconciled. The Hirta and Burghead items may date from the Dark Ages some four centuries or more after the appearance of the Romans and the commencement of the historic era.

Location	Details	Type
North Sea	A flint scraper, found in a marine core taken from the sea bed between Norway and Shetland. The area would have been above sea level between 16,000 and 8000 BC, but the tool might also have been lost overboard at a later date.	(M, O, S)
Assynt	Discoveries in the Inchnadamph caves suggest human predation on lynx, brown bear, Arctic fox and reindeer. There is some evidence that the site may go as far back as the late Paleolithic era, although carbon dating analysis provides an estimate of 6000 BC.	(M, O, S)
Moray	Diverse ancient artefacts from various periods were so commonly found in the Culbin Sands between Forres and Nairn that in the late 19th century "searching for arrows" was a well-known local pastime. 29,500 items are held by the National Museum of Scotland but many thousands more have been lost.	(M, O, S)
Fetlar	Funzie Girt dyke is a wall, probably originally a boundary marker of some kind, that runs north–south across the island. Date unknown, but probably Neolithic. The division of the island by the dyke was so marked that the Norse seemed to treat Fetlar as two distinct islands.	(S)
Aberdeenshire	Petrospheres called "carved stone balls" of uncertain date, also found on Orkney, Skye, Iona and Lewis. The Aberdeenshire finds coincide with unusual "recumbent" stone circles, suggesting a Neolithic provenance.	(S)
Hirta	"Horned structures" in Gleann Mòr including the "Amazon's House". Nothing like them exists anywhere else in Britain or Europe, and their original use is unknown. It is possible they are Pictish and date from 400 to 900 AD, although they may be older.	(S)
Moray	The chambered well at Burghead was discovered in 1809. This underground structure is unique in a Scottish context and is probably of Dark Age origin, although it may be older.	(S)

== See also ==
- List of oldest buildings in the United Kingdom
- List of World Heritage Sites in Scotland
- Prehistoric Orkney
- Prehistoric Scotland
- Scotland during the Roman Empire
- Zenith of Iron Age Shetland

== References and footnotes ==
Footnotes

General references

- Armit, Ian (1998). Scotland's Hidden History. Stroud: Tempus.
- Edwards, Kevin J.; Ralston, Ian B.M., eds. (2003). Scotland After the Ice Age: Environment, Archaeology and History, 8000 BC – AD 1000. Edinburgh: Edinburgh University Press. ISBN 0-7486-1736-1.
- Fleming, Andrew (2005). St. Kilda and the Wider World: Tales of an Iconic Island. Bollington: Windgather Press. ISBN 1-905119-00-3.
- Gillen, Con (2003). Geology and landscapes of Scotland. Harpenden: Terra Publishing.
- Keay, John; Keay, Julia, eds. (1994). Collins Encyclopaedia of Scotland. Hammersmith, London: HarperCollins.
- Kirk, William (1983). "Prehistoric Scotland: The Regional Dimension". In Clapperton, Chalmers M. (ed.). Scotland: A New Study. Newton Abbot; North Pomfret, Vt.: David & Charles. ISBN 978-0-7153-8084-0..
- McKirdy, Alan; Gordon, John; Crofts, Roger (2007). Land of Mountain and Flood: The Geology and Landforms of Scotland. Edinburgh: Birlinn. ISBN 978-1-84158-357-0.
- Moffat, Alistair (2005). Before Scotland: The Story of Scotland Before History. London: Thames & Hudson.
- Murray, William Hutchison (1973). The Islands of Western Scotland: The Inner and Outer Hebrides. London: Eyre Methuen.
- Omand, Donald, ed. (2006). The Argyll Book. Edinburgh: Birlinn. ISBN 1-84158-480-0.
- Rixson, Denis (2001). The Small Isles: Canna, Rum, Eigg and Muck. Edinburgh: Birlinn.
- Sandars, Nancy K. (1968). Prehistoric Art in Europe. Harmondsworth: Penguin Books.
- Wickham-Jones, Caroline (2007). Orkney: a historical guide. Edinburgh: Birlinn.
