= Tomb of the Eagles =

Neolithic chambered tomb

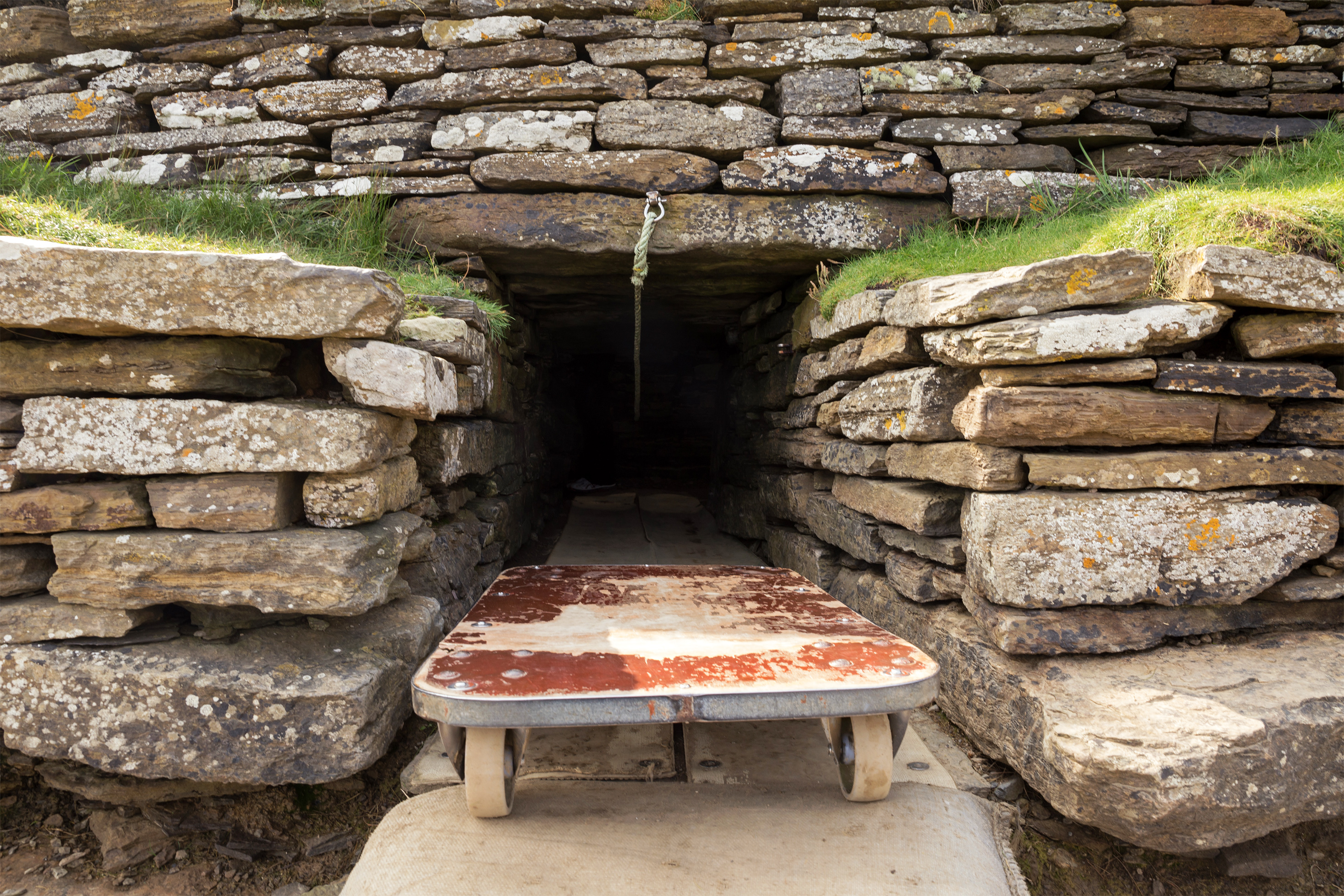
- The tomb in 2017
- Interactive map of Tomb of the Eagles
- 58.7449557°N 2.9168817°W
- Type: Tomb
- Location: Scotland

History
- Built: c. 3200 BC

Site notes
- Material: Stone
- Height: 2.75 metres (9 ft 0 in)
- Length: 3 metres (9.8 ft) (entrance tunnel)
- Discovered: 1958 by Ronald Simison

The Tomb of the Eagles, or Isbister Chambered Cairn, is a Neolithic chambered tomb located on a cliff edge at Isbister on South Ronaldsay in Orkney, Scotland. The site was discovered by Ronald Simison, a farmer, when digging flagstones in 1958; he conducted a limited excavation and removed some bones and skulls at that time but filled in the site with dirt. He carried out more extensive excavations between 1976 and 1982, which revealed the significance of the site.

Alerted by Simison, archaeologist John Hedges mounted a full study, prepared a technical report and wrote a popular book that cemented the tomb's name. The Archaeological Journal review of the Hedges book (Tomb of the eagles a window on Stone Age tribal Britain) provided a less than stellar rating: "reasonably well done", "but how very much better it might have been".

== The findings ==
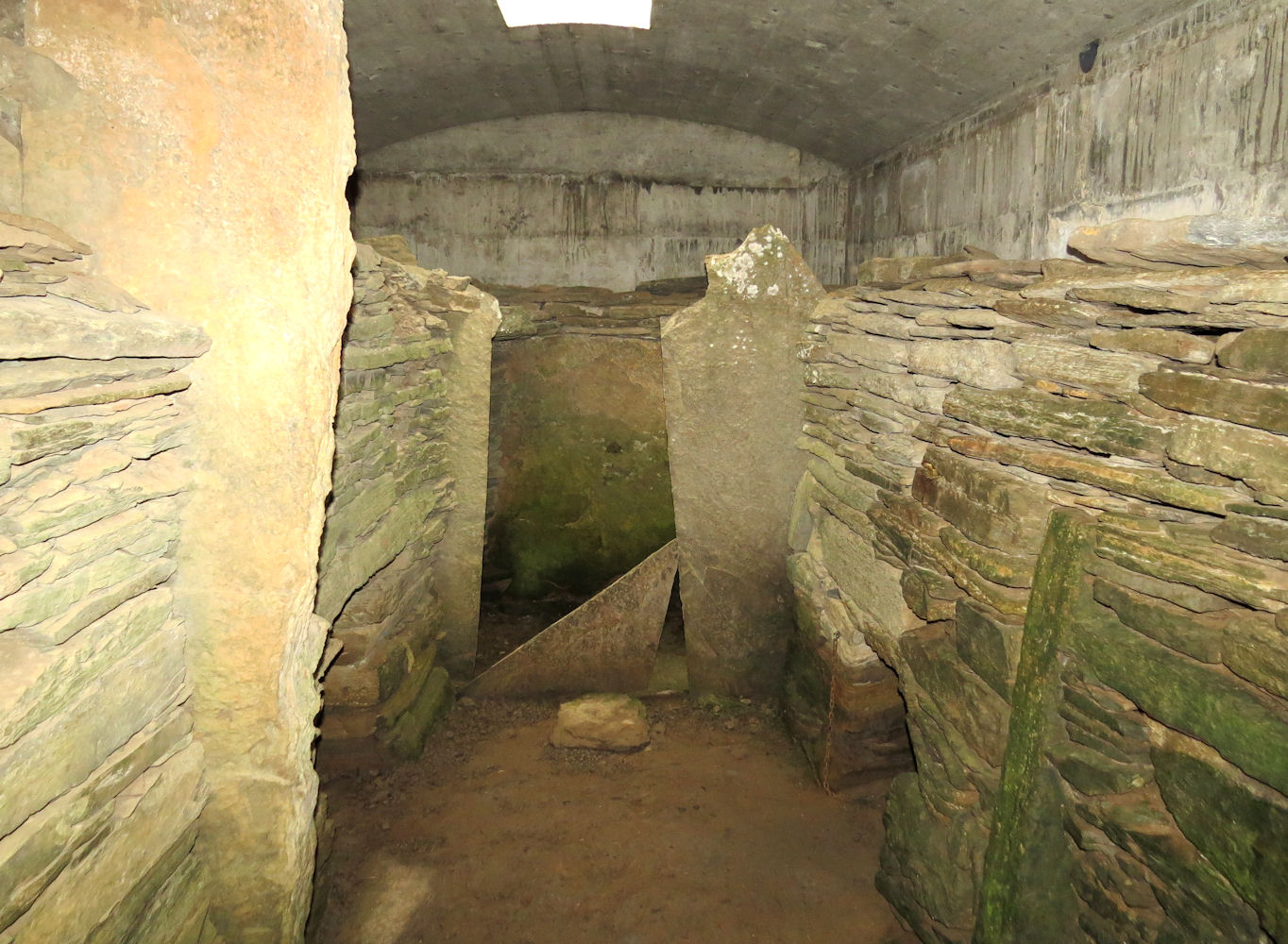
Inside the tomb

At the site, 16,000 human bones have been found, from at least 324 individuals, but no intact skeletons. Mixed with the human bones were talons and bones from eight to 20 birds. Some believed that the eagle was a totem animal for the individuals entombed here, but subsequent research indicated that the bird artifacts were added at a later time. These were identified as predominantly belonging to the white-tailed sea eagle (Haliaeetus albicilla). The original interpretation of the bird artifacts suggested a foundation deposit. That interpretation was subsequently challenged by new dating techniques. These reveal that the eagles died c. 2450-2050 BC, up to 1,000 years after the building of the tomb. This confirms growing evidence from other sites that the Neolithic tombs of Orkney remained in use for many generations.

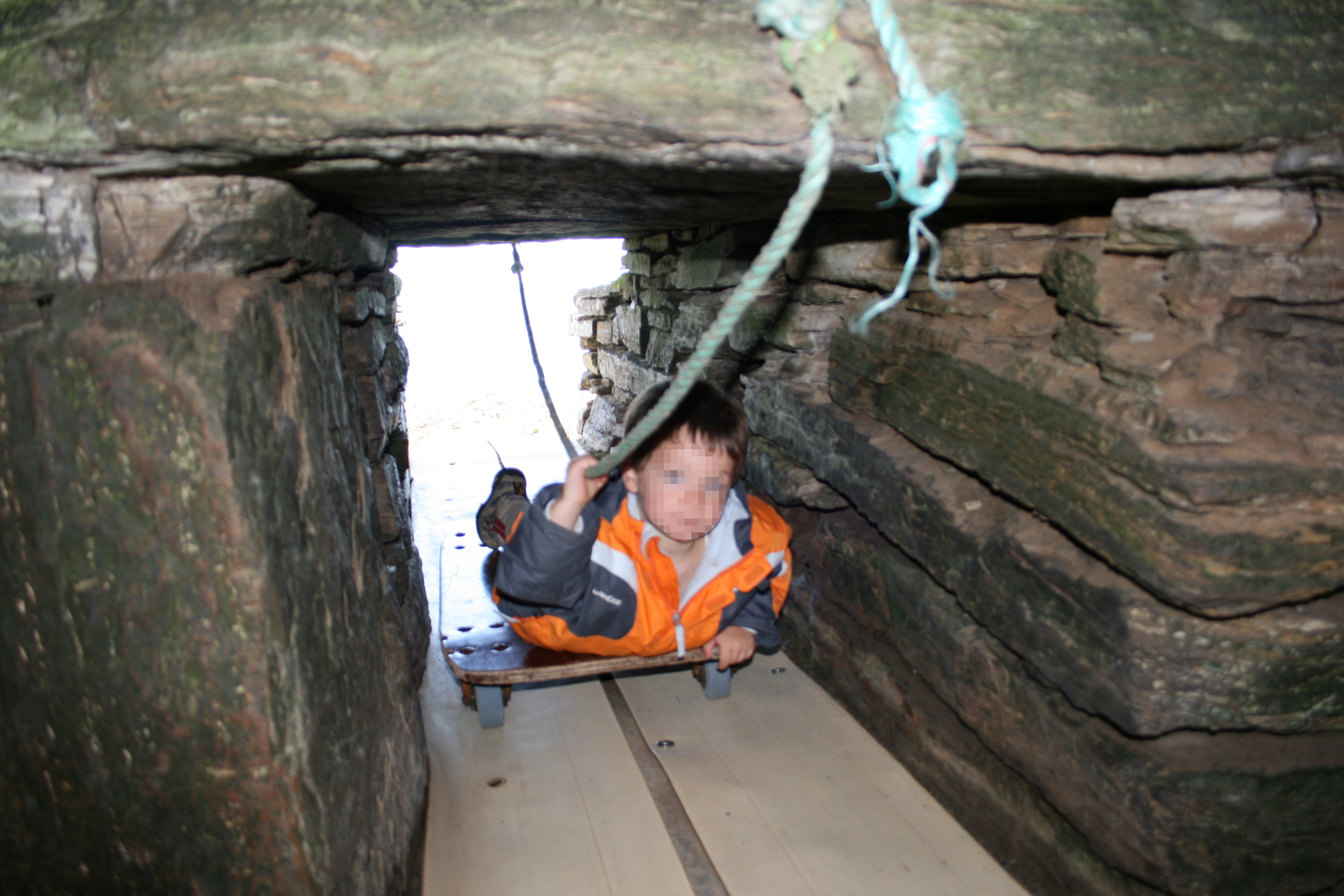
Access tunnel trolley

According to a well-documented research report, the builders of the tomb were capable of "sophisticated architectural design" and had "advanced engineering skills and an understanding of astronomy and mathematics"; the labourers had "exceptional talent, especially since it is assumed that only primitive tools were available". Radiocarbon dating suggests that the construction may have taken a full century. Archeologists believe that the tomb "was used regularly for 800 years, with the last burial around 1600 BC". Expert analysis of the bones indicates that "these people experienced energetic lives of health, but also encountered many of the injuries and diseases that afflict contemporary society". A later expert examination of the 85 skulls, however, indicated that at least 20% had sustained some type of violent injury, possibly from "wooden clubs and stone axes".

Access to the tomb is via a low tunnel 3 metres (9.8 ft) long. Visitors lie flat on a wheeled trolley, and then stand up in the interior of the tomb. During the COVID-19 pandemic, the tomb closed to the public. However, in June 2025, the South Ronaldsay and Burray Development Trust announced that it had received a grant of £101,607 from the National Lottery Heritage Fund to enable it to purchase the site. The tomb reopened to visitors in the summer of 2026.

== In popular media ==
In January 2017 the tomb was featured in the BBC Two archaeology series Britain's Ancient Capital: Secrets of Orkney.

== See also ==
- Timeline of prehistoric Scotland
- Oldest buildings in the United Kingdom
