= Icomb =

Village in Gloucestershire, England

Coordinates: 51°54′N 1°42′W

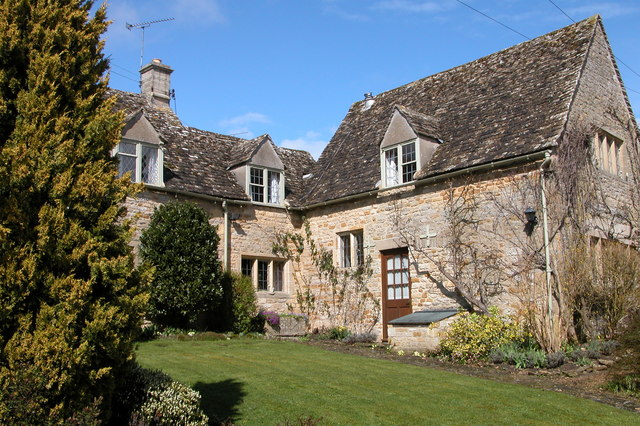

- Location within Gloucestershire
- Population: 202 (2011 Census)
- District: Cotswold
- Shire county: Gloucestershire
- Region: South West
- Country: England
- Sovereign state: United Kingdom
- Post town: Cheltenham
- Postcode district: GL54
- Police: Gloucestershire
- Fire: Gloucestershire
- Ambulance: South Western
- UK Parliament: North Cotswolds

Icomb is a village in the Gloucestershire Cotswolds, near to Stow on the Wold. The population taken at the 2011 census was 202.

The village appears as Iacumbe in the Domesday Book.

== Parish Church ==
The Church of St Mary is the parish church which has a Norman north doorway and an Early English south porch and doorway dating from around 1249. It is a grade I listed building.

== Icomb Place ==
The Grade I listed building Icomb Place on the edge of the village was significantly altered by Sir John Blaket in 1421, a knight who fought with Henry V at the Battle of Agincourt and died in 1431, whose tomb is in the church.
