= Icomb Place =

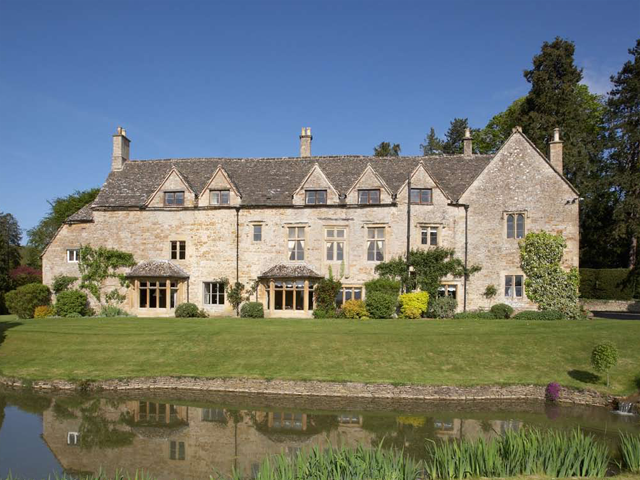

- Location in Gloucestershire
- 51°54′0.35″N 1°41′41.5″W
- Location: Icomb, Gloucestershire, England

History
- Begun: 11th century

Listed Building – Grade I
- Official name: Icomb Place
- Designated: 25 August 1960
- Reference no.: 1153494

Icomb Place (pronounced "Ickum") is a medieval manor house on the edge of the village of Icomb, near Stow on the Wold in Gloucestershire. The word "place" in this context is thought to be a precursor of "palace".

== Description ==
The house is a Grade I listed building. Mentioned in Domesday Book and owned by Roger de Lacy at the time, the house has undergone considerable alteration since its 11th-century beginnings with only the moat and North Wing remaining. The house seems to have started out as a modest courtyard dwelling, but later (some time before 1423) was made grander by the creation of the great hall and remodelling of the solar (with barrel vaulted timber roof). The building has many unusual features: for example, no room has a right angle on its plan view, all rooms being a trapezium in form.

The oldest parts of the building date from between 1086 and 1420 and include the undercroft (northwest wing), the battlemented gateway and the southeast wing, originally the kitchens and servants' quarters. The great hall is disproportionally large and its upper end obtrudes into the line of the solar range. It is a substantial room of 44 by 20 ft (13 by 6 m) and is divided into five bays by braced collar-beam trusses in the walls at the side. Other similar trusses extend along the entire north range which contain two original bedrooms. These bedrooms have fireplaces connected to mid-level chimney stacks.

The 17th-century parts of the house on the east elevation include a great chamber on the first floor which contains a pair of one of the world's earliest surviving flying (or floating) mullion windows.

The alterations carried out in c.1420 were undertaken by the then owner, Sir John Blacket, "the hero of Agincourt" (who fought alongside Henry V of England at the Battle of Agincourt and is buried in the nearby church). At this point the house had two courtyards, and most of the oak timber used for the re-roofing was felled in the winter of 1421/1422 from the nearby Cirencester area.

After a period of dereliction during the 18th and 19th centuries the house was bought by Samuel Simpson Hayward, the father of George Simpson-Hayward, who made alterations to the building. The renovation at the start of the 20th century demolished the south wing and southern courtyard and constructed a rock garden and extensive greenhouses, some of which remain today.
