= Braeside chambered cairn =

Neolithic chambered cairn located on the island of Eday in Orkney, Scotland

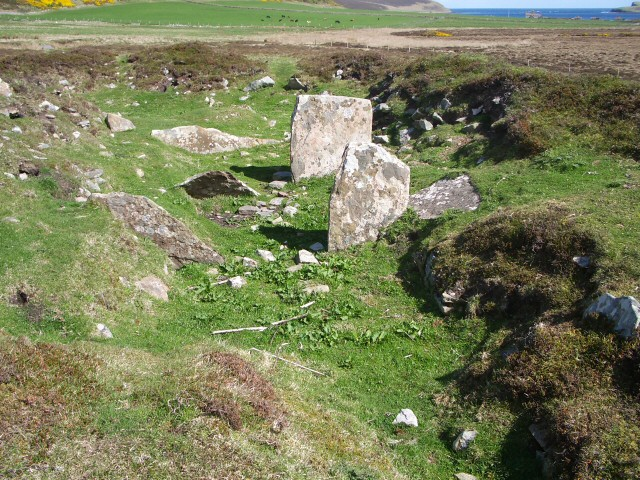
- Braeside chambered cairn

- Location within Orkney Islands
- 59°13′21″N 2°46′00″W
- Type: Chambered cairn
- Periods: Neolithic
- Location: Eday, Orkney, Scotland

Site notes
- Public access: Yes

Braeside chambered cairn is a Neolithic burial monument located on the island of Eday in Orkney, Scotland. It is an Orkney-Cromarty type stalled cairn, similar in construction to the Midhowe Chambered Cairn on the island of Rousay. Because of prior robbing, the Braeside cairn has been reduced to a few upright stones at the ground level, covered with turf and heather. The cairn is located on the Eday Heritage Trail.

== Description ==
The Braeside cambered cairn is located on the island of Eday, in Orkney, Scotland. The tomb lies in the north part of the island, and is located on the Eday Heritage Trail. It is situated southeast of the Vinquoy chambered cairn and north of the Stone of Setter. Braeside is a type of Orkney-Cromarty stalled cairn, because its inner compartments are divided by upright stone slabs.

The monument is approximately 31 m (102 ft) by 17.6 m (58 ft). The entrance to the tomb is situated on the south end and directly faces the Stone of Setter. The tomb was uncovered in an unrecorded excavation and robbed many years ago. What can still be seen are several pairs of upright slabs and the original back stone. The monument is now covered in turf and heather. It was originally constructed of rounded stones, which is different than the typical flat slab construction of similar chambered cairns. Just beyond the monument are several large slabs, suggesting a smaller, second chamber.

== See also ==
- Huntersquoy chambered cairn
- Midhowe Chambered Cairn
- Unstan chambered cairn
