= Quanterness chambered cairn =

Neolithic chambered cairn on Orkney, Scotland

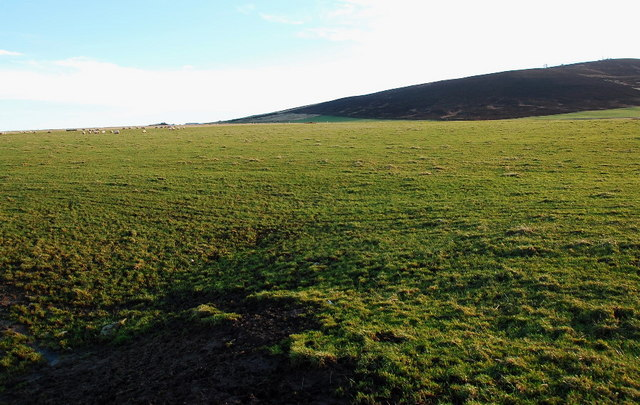
- View toward Quanterness Farm and Wideford Hill

- Location within Orkney Islands
- 59°00′03″N 3°00′56″W
- Type: Chambered cairn
- Periods: Neolithic
- Location: Mainland, Orkney, Scotland

History
- Built: c. 3400 BC

Site notes
- Public access: Yes

Quanterness chambered cairn is a Neolithic burial monument located on Mainland, Orkney in Scotland. An Iron Age roundhouse built into the cairn was discovered during excavation in the early 1970s. The dwelling was constructed around 700 BC. Also found during excavation, were the remains of 157 people, pottery remnants and other artefacts. Historic Environment Scotland established the site as a scheduled monument in 1929.

== Location ==
Quanterness chambered cairn is located on Mainland, Orkney in Scotland. It sits at the base of the north side of Wideford Hill and is situated north-east of the Wideford Hill chambered cairn. The site overlooks the North Isles. It is one of three chambered cairns found between the towns of Kirkwall and Finstown. The tomb is on private property and is not accessible to the public.

== Description ==
The cairn is now a large grass-covered mound, 30 m (98 ft) in diameter and 3.2 m (10 ft) in height. The mound covers a Neolithic burial monument and the remains of an Iron Age roundhouse. A long entrance passage led from the east end of the cairn into a long chamber, 6.5m by 1.9 m and 3.5 m high. The primary chamber, rectangular in shape, opened into two cells on each side of the chamber and one on each end.

The cairn is a Maeshowe type of chambered cairn. Radiocarbon dating has placed its construction to around 3400 BC. An interesting feature of this tomb is a small window-sized opening into one of the cells from the main chamber. The opening may have been important part of ceremonial functions conducted in the tomb.

== History ==
The Rev George Barry excavated the burial monument sometime around 1796 by entering through the roof of the monument. The mound at that time had the shape of a truncated cone, with a height of 4.27 m (14.0 ft). The tomb consisted of a main chamber and several smaller chambers. There was an attempt to dig through the rubble filled long entrance passage, but that was discontinued after 4.27 m (14.0 ft). The floor of the main chamber was covered with a layer of human, animal and bird skeletal remains mixed with soil and rocks.

The site was not excavated again until 1972. From 1972 to 1974, archaeologist Colin Renfrew investigated the burial monument with the goal of further studying the mound's interior and to obtain organic material for radiocarbon dating. His study revealed that the mound covered a rectangular chamber and six side compartments. He recovered large quantities of human skeletal remains, approximately 12,500 fragments along with pottery and other artefacts. Near the opening of the entrance passage, and built into the mound, a circular structure was uncovered that was later determined to be an Iron Age roundhouse. The roundhouse dates to probably around 700 BC. Renfrew left much of the tomb and its contents and part of the roundhouse intact for future investigations.

Analysis of the excavated skeletal remains indicate 157 human burials. Other areas of the tomb were not excavated and estimates are that there are possibly 400 people interred in the burial monument. The pottery remnants were determined to belong to at least 34 Grooved ware vessels. Other artefacts include hammerstone, flint knives, bone pins and a hammer made from an antler. Historic Environment Scotland established the site as a scheduled monument in 1929.

== See also ==
- Taversöe Tuick
- Vinquoy chambered cairn
- Cuween Hill Chambered Cairn
