= Quoyness chambered cairn =

Neolithic chambered cairn located on Sanday in Orkney, Scotland

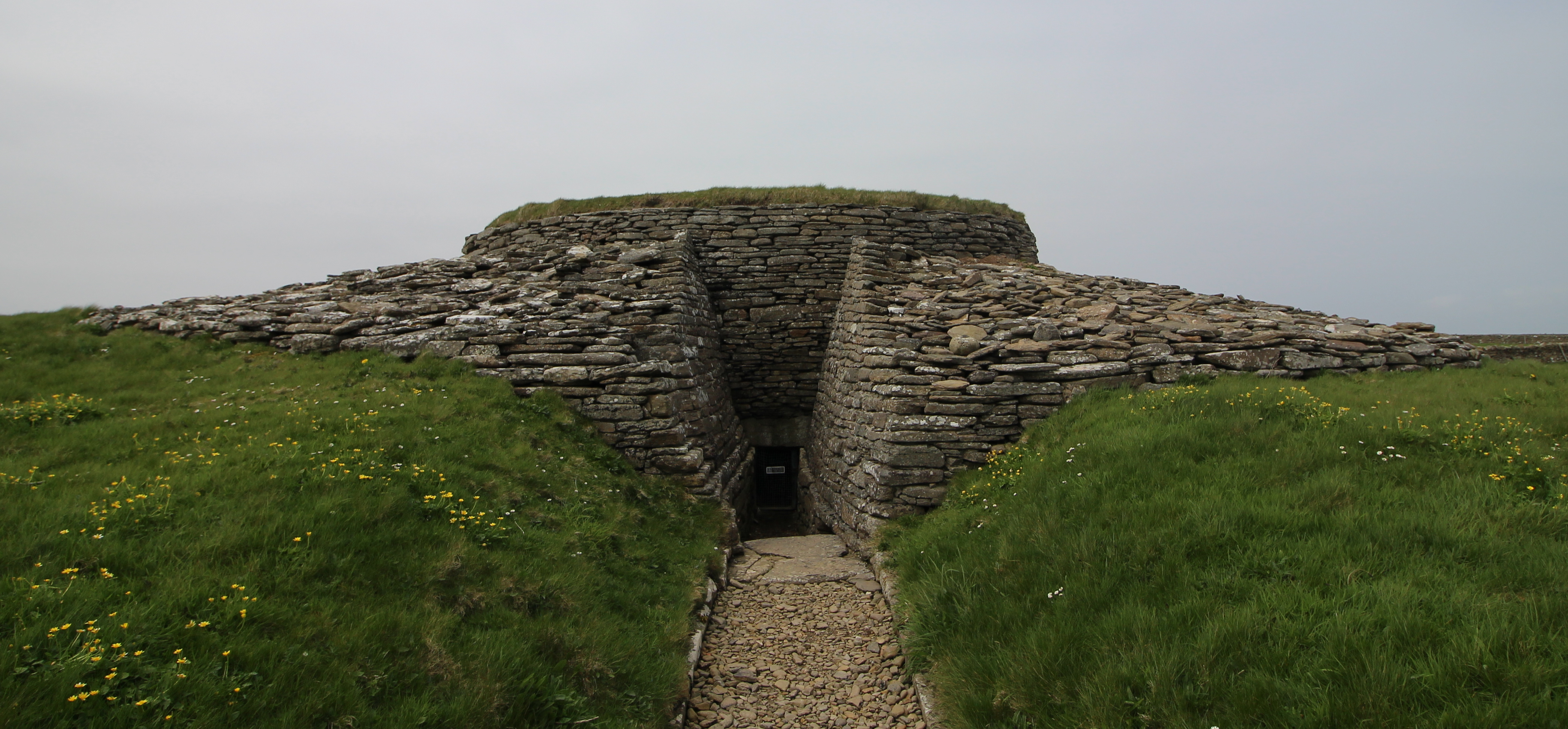
- The cairn in 2018

- Location in Scotland
- 59°13′32″N 2°34′06″W
- Type: Chambered cairn
- Periods: Neolithic
- Location: Sanday, Scotland

History
- Built: c. 3000 BC

Site notes
- Material: Stone
- Owner: Historic Scotland
- Public access: Yes

Quoyness chambered cairn is a Neolithic burial monument located on the island of Sanday in Orkney, Scotland. Similar to Maeshowe in design, the tomb was probably built around 3000 BC. The skeletal remains of several people were uncovered in the tomb during excavation in 1867. The monument was partially restored and reconstructed after a second excavation during the early 1950s, to display the different original stages of construction of the tomb. The property is now in the care of Historic Environment Scotland as a scheduled monument.

== Description ==
Quoyness chambered cairn is located on the Elsness peninsula, on the island of Sanday in Orkney. It is a large, oval Maeshowe type chambered cairn, probably built around 3000 BC. The cairn sits on a wide, oval-shaped stone platform and was built with a mix of stones, earth and waste material intermixed with horizontal slabs. A stone kerb surrounds the platform on the south and the west ends. The cairn is built with a concentric ring of stones that are now visible. The cairn would have originally been covered with earth and turf.

The 9 m (30 ft) entrance is on the southeastern side of the monument and leads into the main chamber.

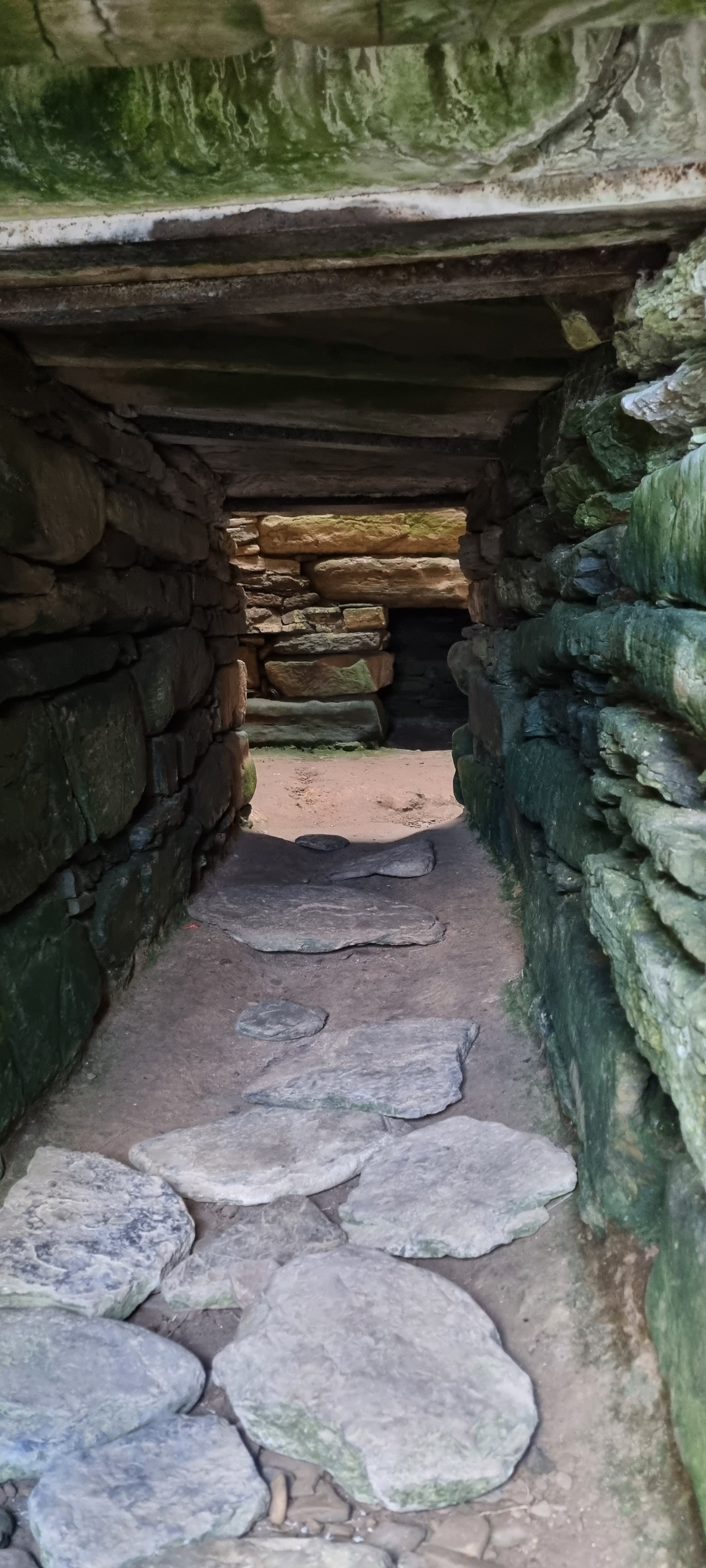
Quoyness chambered cairn entrance

The tomb is lacking its original roof. The main chamber is rectangular in shape, and is approximately 4 by 2 m (13.1 by 6.6 ft). Six small cells open off the main chamber and are corbelled. The walls that are still standing reach almost 4 m (13 ft) in height. At the cairn's south end, three lintel slabs, perhaps not original to the cairn, form a roof. A small trench runs across the clay floor of the burial chamber from the entrance opening to the north wall. The monument been updated with a modern roof and is open to the public.

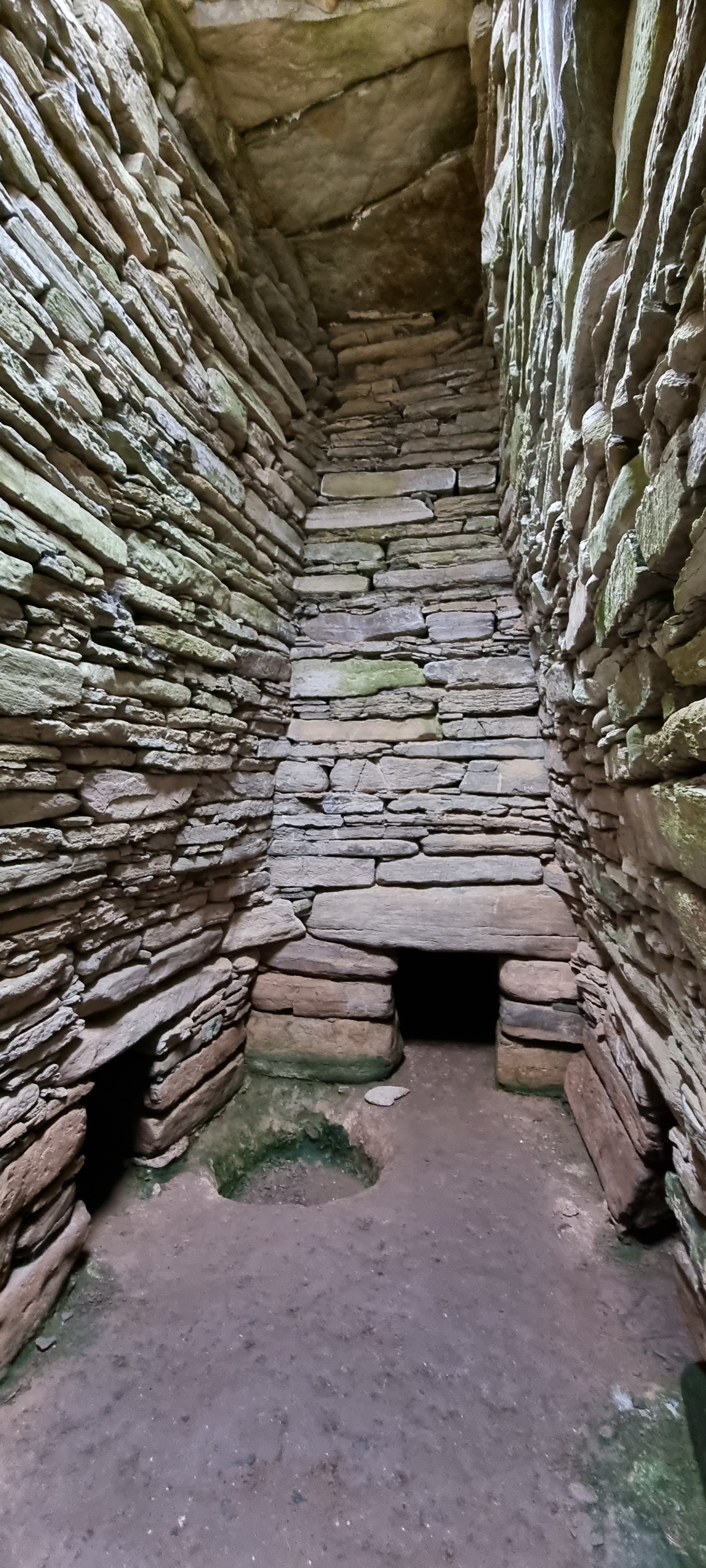
Quoyness chambered cairn interior

== History ==
The cairn was excavated by James Farrer and George Petrie in 1867. The site was originally believed to be a broch, but after excavation, the antiquarians determined that the site was a chambered cairn. During excavation, a stone-lined cist was found in the south corner of the primary chamber. Skeletal remains of at least ten adults and possibly four children were discovered in the cist. Several other skeletal remains were found in the side cells and in the entrance passage. Farrer left most of the human bones in the chamber. Other artefacts were also recovered, including animal bones, stone tools, sherds of pottery and two spiked slate objects and a large bone pin with a knob on the shank. The stone objects were similar to finds from western Scotland, Wales, Portugal and Spain.

Gordon Childe supervised a second excavation of the tomb in 1951 and 1952. After the excavation was complete, the monument was partially restored and reconstructed to display the different stages of construction of the burial monument. Historic Environment Scotland established the site as a scheduled monument in 1994.

== See also ==
- Tofts Ness
- Vinquoy chambered cairn
- Wideford Hill chambered cairn
