= Stone of Setter =

Neolithic standing stone located on the island of Eday in Orkney, Scotland

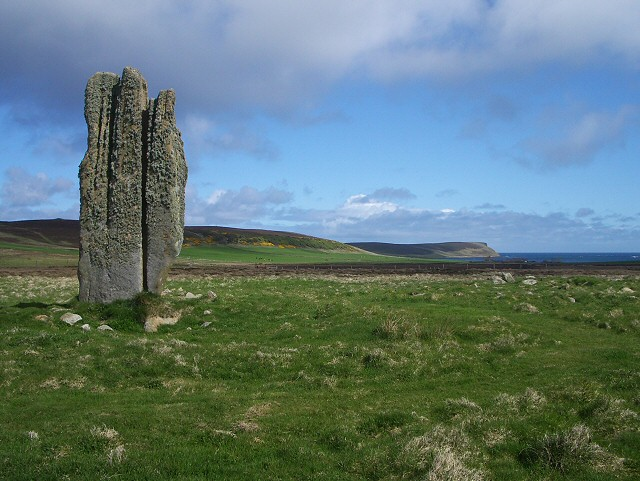
- The Stone in 2006

- Location in Scotland, United Kingdom
- 59°13′09″N 2°45′52″W
- Type: Standing stone
- Periods: Late Neolithic or Early Bronze Age
- Location: Sanday, Orkney, Scotland

History
- Built: c. 1500 BC

Site notes
- Material: Stone
- Height: c. 4.5 meters
- Width: c. 2.1 meters
- Owner: Historic Scotland

The Stone of Setter is a Neolithic standing stone located on the island of Eday, in Orkney, Scotland. It dates to the Late Neolithic or Early Bronze Age, around the 2nd millennium BC. Outside of the Stones of Stenness, this monument is the tallest monolith in Orkney. Historic Environment Scotland established the site as a scheduled monument in 1936.

== Location ==
Situated 25 meters above sea level, in the north-central area of the island of Eday in Orkney, Scotland, the Stone of Setter overlooks Calf Sound. It is located near several burial monuments: the Vinquoy, Huntersquoy and Braeside chambered cairns. The stone is on private property, but can be seen from the road.

== Description ==
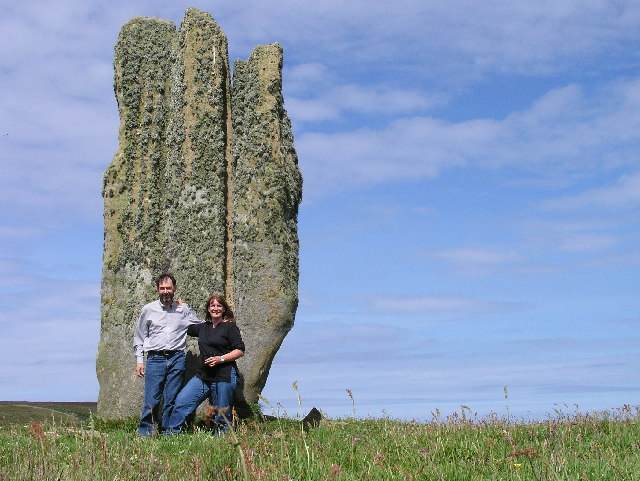
Stone of Setter, Eday

The Stone of Setter is an extremely tall sandstone monolith of irregular shape. It dates to the Late Neolithic or Early Bronze Age, probably around 2nd millennium BC. It measures approximately 4.5 m (15 ft) in height, 2.1 m (6 ft 11 in) in width, and the stone varies in thickness from 90 cm (3.0 ft) at the base to 35 cm (1.15 ft) at the center. It is deeply weathered with heavy vertical lines and stands in its original placement. The monolith sits on the south edge of a circular platform 10 m (33 ft) in diameter, and 20 cm (7.9 in) in height. Outside of the Stones of Stenness, this monument is the tallest monolith in Orkney. Historic Environment Scotland established the site as a scheduled monument in 1936.

== See also ==
- Prehistoric Orkney
- Ring of Brodgar
- Callanish Stones
