= Rennibister Earth House =

Iron age underground structure

Coordinates: 58°59′46″N 3°03′02″W

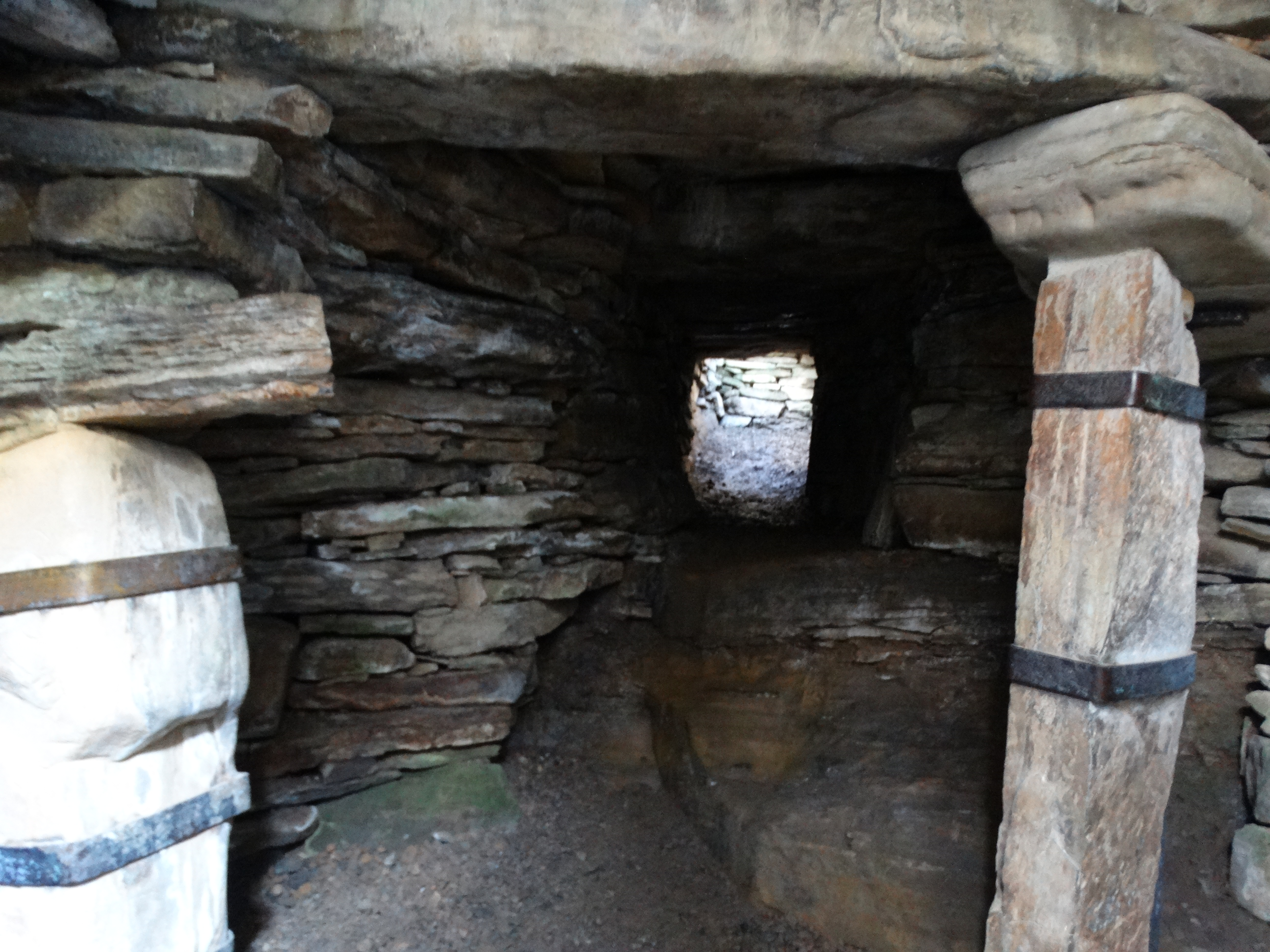
Inside Rennbister Earth House

Rennibister Earth House is an Iron Age underground structure known as a souterrain. It is located on the Mainland of Orkney, in Scotland. The monument was discovered in 1926 when a threshing machine caused the roof to collapse. During excavation, the skeletal remains of six adults and twelve children were uncovered. Historic Environment Scotland established the site as a scheduled monument in 1928.

== Description ==
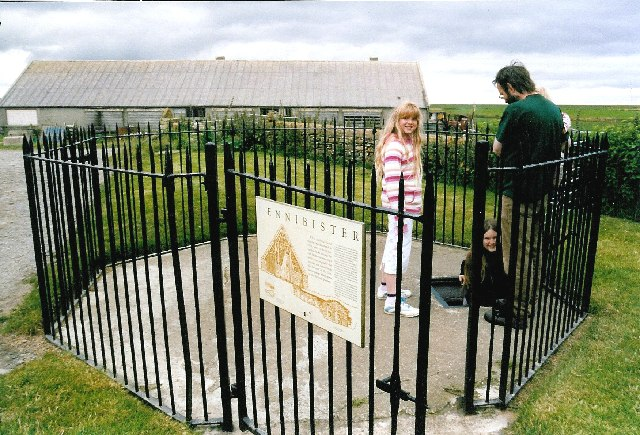
Entrance to the site.

The earth house is located in a farmyard near the southeastern shore of the Bay o' Firth, on the Mainland of Orkney, in Scotland. Access to the underground monument is by ladder to a hatch in the roof. The souterrain has an entrance passage which is 3.5 m (11 ft) long with a drop of around 0.7 m (2 ft 4 in) to the floor of the chamber. The chamber is hexagonal in shape and measures 3.3 m (11 ft), and is 2.5 m (8 ft 2 in) in width. The walls were built with a combination of slabs laid on edge and rough masonry. The 1.5 m (4 ft 11 in) corbelled roof is supported by four stone pillars. The walls are lined with five small alcoves.

== History ==
The Iron Age monument was discovered when a threshing machine caused the roof to collapse on 12 November 1926. During the initial examination of the structure, the chamber floor was covered with a large number of skeletal remains, and an ox-scapula, which was probably used as a spade. In all, the disarticulated skeletal remains were determined to be six adults and twelve children, probably belonging to two or three family groups. The remains have been dated from the middle to late Iron Age, several hundred years after the earth house was initially constructed.

Rennibister lies close to the shore of the Bay of Firth, a fertile area of land which has been in continual use as a settlement since the Neolithic era. Nearby, are three Neolithic chambered cairns, including Wideford Hill chambered cairn and the Cuween Hill Chambered Cairn. Another earth house, the Grain Earth House was discovered in the 19th century between Rennibister and Grain. Both earth houses are dated to the first millennium, probably around 400 BC.

The site has been in the care of Historic Environment Scotland as a scheduled monument since 1928.
