= Unstan =

Unstan may refer to:

- Unstan chambered cairn
- Unstan ware
