= Huntersquoy chambered cairn =

Neolithic chambered cairn in the islands of Orkney

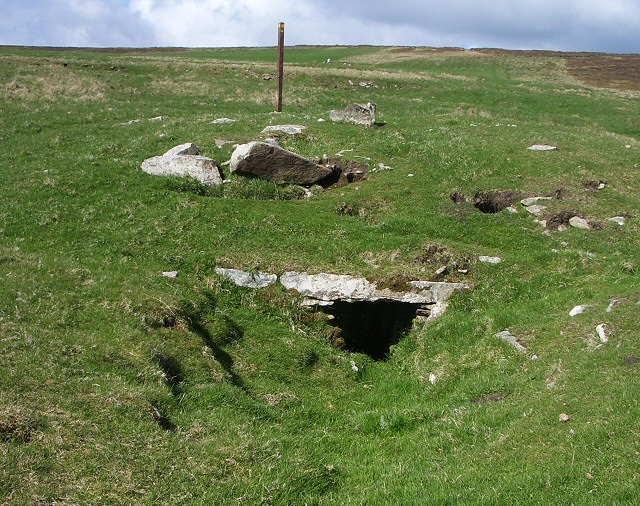
- The cairn in 2006

- Location in Scotland, United Kingdom
- 59°13′27″N 2°46′05″W
- Type: Chambered cairn
- Periods: Neolithic
- Location: Scotland, United Kingdom

History
- Built: c. 2500 BC

Site notes
- Owner: Historic Scotland
- Public access: Yes

Huntersquoy chambered cairn is a Neolithic chambered cairn located on the island of Eday, in Orkney, Scotland. The monument dates from the 3rd millennium BC and is an Orkney–Cromarty type chambered cairn. Huntersquoy is a distinctive two-storey burial monument with overlapping chambers. Historic Environment Scotland established the site as a scheduled monument in 1936.

== Description ==
Huntersquoy chambered cairn is situated on a gently sloping hill overlooking Calf Sound, on the island of Eday, in Orkney, Scotland. It is a good example of an Orkney–Cromarty chambered cairn. It dates from the Neolithic era, sometime during the years 3000 through 2001 BC. These tombs, often called "stalled cairns" are characterized by a central passage edged by upright stones which divide spaces into separate chambers.

Huntersquoy is unique in that it is a rare double-storied burial monument. It is seen as a small, unobtrusive, circular mound, 10 m (33 ft) in diameter and 60 cm (2.0 ft) in height above ground. It contains two overlaying chambers. The Bookan-type lower chamber is intact and below ground, but the upper chamber, above ground, is in ruins. The entrance passage to the lower chamber is unobstructed but often flooded. The two chambers have separate entrance passages: the lower entrance faces east and downhill, while the upper passage faces west and uphill. At the entrance to the lower chamber, the height is 1.75 m (5 ft 9 in), but rapidly drops as the passage progresses.

The roof of the lower chamber was constructed of enormous flat lintels laid across the chamber. Very little remains of the upper chamber. The upper chamber was originally rectangular in shape and aligned west to east. It was most likely divided into three compartments. A portion of the upper chamber was built over the lower chamber's roof slabs. The monument was originally scheduled in 1936.

The monument was first excavated in 1936. The cairn was in ruins at the time of excavation. Finds from the tomb were donated to the National Museum of Antiquities of Scotland by landowner, Major H. Hebden of Carrick House, Eday in 1938.

== See also ==
- Vinquoy chambered cairn
- Unstan chambered cairn
- Cuween Hill Chambered Cairn
- Midhowe Chambered Cairn
