= Grooved ware =

Type of prehistoric pottery

Grooved ware is the name given to a pottery style of the British Neolithic. Its manufacturers are sometimes known as the Grooved ware people. Unlike the later Beaker ware, Grooved culture was not an import from the continent but seems to have developed in Orkney, early in the 3rd millennium BC, and was soon adopted in Great Britain and Ireland.

The diagnostic shape for the style is a flat-bottomed pot with straight sides sloping outwards and grooved decoration around the top. Beyond this the pottery comes in many varieties, some with complex geometric decorations others with applique bands added. The latter has led some archaeologists to argue that the style is a skeuomorph and is derived from wicker basketry.

Grooved ware pots excavated at Balfarg in Fife have been chemically analysed to determine their contents. It appears that some of the vessels there may have been used to hold black henbane (Hyoscyamus niger) which is a poison and a powerful hallucinogen.

Since many Grooved ware pots have been found at henge sites and in burials, it is possible that they may have had a ritual purpose as well as a functional one. Grooved ware comes in many sizes, some vessels are extremely large, c. 30 imperial gallons (140 litres; 36 US gallons), and would be suitable for fermentation. The majority are smaller, ranging from jug- to cup-size, and could be used for serving and drinking. The theory that the first British farmers (c. 4000 BC) had the knowledge and ability to make ale from their crops with their pottery appears to be controversial and not yet widely discussed by the archaeological community.

The earliest examples have been found in Orkney and may have evolved from earlier Unstan ware bowls. Excavations at nearby Ness of Brodgar have revealed many sherds of finely decorated Grooved ware pottery, some of it representing very large pots. Many drinking vessels have also been identified. The style soon spread and it was used by the builders of the first phase of Stonehenge. Grooved ware pottery has been found in abundance in excavations at Durrington Walls and Marden Henge in Wiltshire. Here, the feasting would have involved drinking ale and eating pork. Smaller quantities of Grooved ware have been found at the nearby site of Figsbury Ring.

Grooved ware was previously referred to as Rinyo-Clacton ware, first identified by Stuart Piggott in the 1950s and named after sites where it was found. Rinyo is a Neolithic settlement on the island of Rousay, Orkney. The site at Clacton now lies under the sea.

One way the tradition may have spread is through trade routes up the west coast of Britain. What seems unusual is that although they shared the same style of pottery, different regions still maintained vastly different traditions. Evidence at some early Henges (Mayburgh Henge, Ring of Brodgar, Arbor Low) suggests that there were staging and trading points on a national 'motorway' during the Neolithic and Bronze Age. This evidence perhaps explains how Cumbrian stone axes found their way to Orkney.

Unstan ware, a variation on grooved ware, emerged in Orkney. The people who used Unstan ware had totally different burial practices but managed to co-exist with their Grooved ware counterparts. Some hybrid chambered cairns have emerged in this region, containing architectural features of both the Maeshowe subclass and the Orkney-Cromarty stalled subclasses of cairn.

== Gallery ==
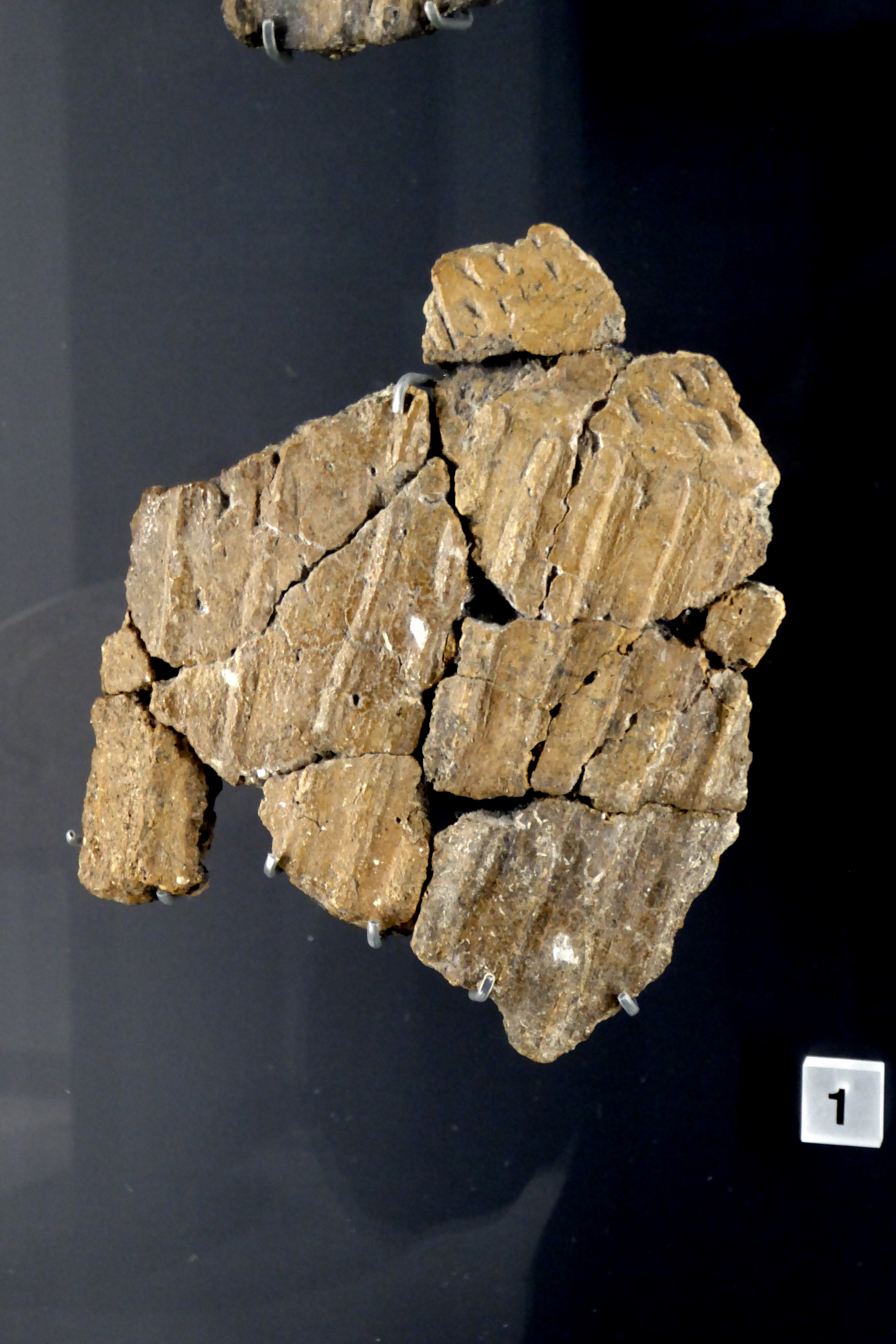
Grooved Ware sherd from Durrington Walls

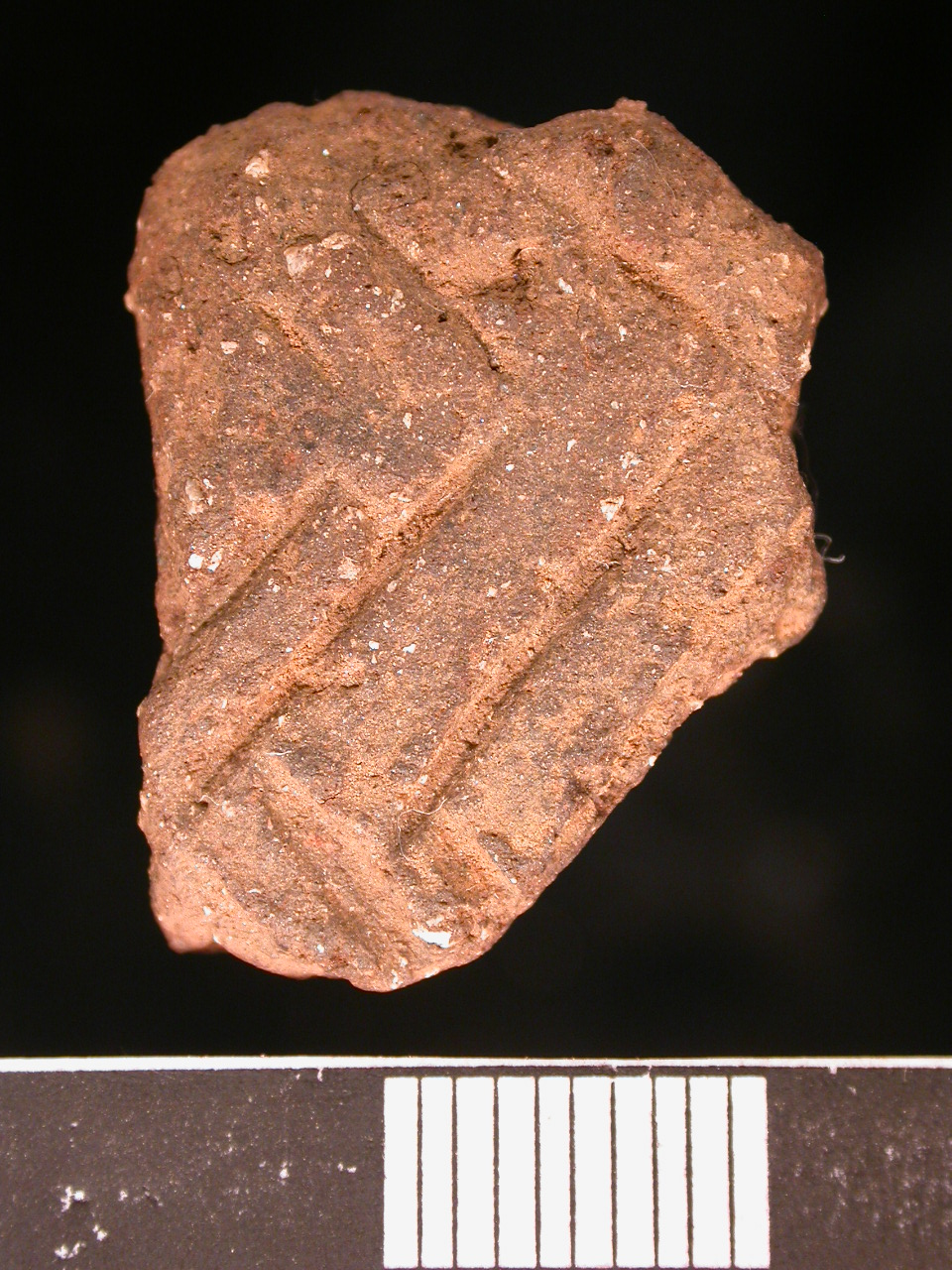
Grooved ware sherd from Cornwall

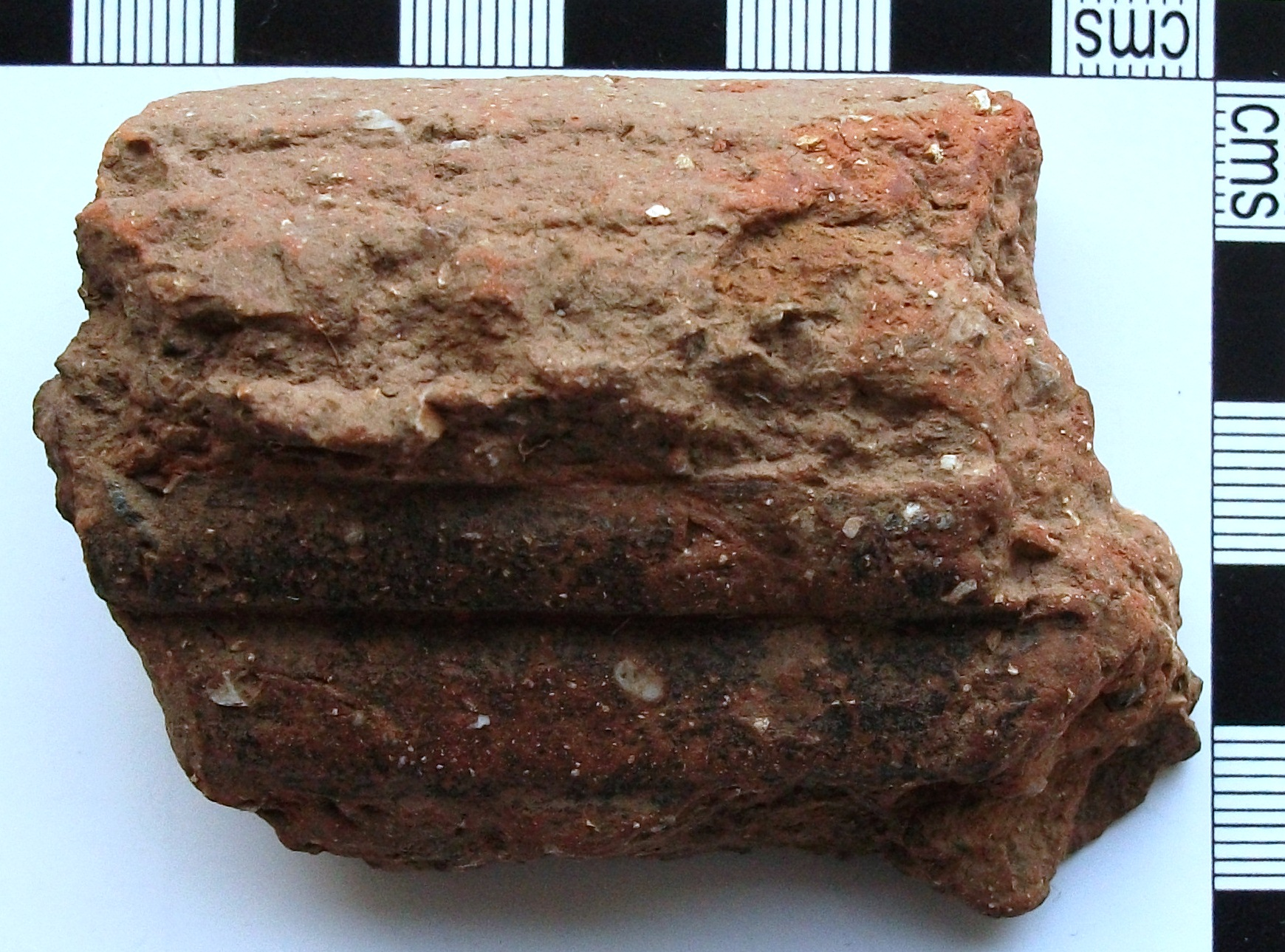
A sherd from the rim of a large grooved Cornish urn

== See also ==
- Bronze Age Britain
