= Unstan ware =

Type of pottery

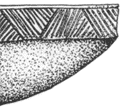
Fragment of an Unstan ware bowl.

Unstan ware is the name used by archaeologists for a type of finely made and decorated Neolithic pottery from the 4th and 3rd millennia BC. Typical are elegant and distinctive shallow bowls with a band of grooved patterning below the rim, a type of decoration which was created using a technique known as "stab-and-drag". A second version consists of undecorated, round-bottomed bowls. Some of the bowls had bits of volcanic rock included in the clay to make them stronger. Bone tools were used to burnish the surfaces to make them shiny and impermeable.

Unstan ware is named after the Unstan Chambered Cairn on the Mainland of the Orkney Islands, a fine example of a stalled chambered tomb in a circular mound, where the style of pottery was first found in 1884. Unstan ware is mostly found in tombs, specifically tombs of the Orkney-Cromarty type. These include the Tomb of the Eagles at Isbister on South Ronaldsay, and Taversoe Tuick and Midhowe on Rousay.

Unstan ware has been found occasionally at sites in Orkney other than tombs; for example, the farmstead of Knap of Howar on Papa Westray. Although more recent excavations in Orkney have found Unstan ware to be a more common feature in a domestic context than previously thought, challenging the interpretation of Unstan ware being mainly from tombs and in the Western Isles, as at Eilean Domhnuill.

Unstan ware may have evolved into the later grooved ware style. This interpretation was originally based primarily on a presumed evolution in pottery styles, from Unstan ware to grooved ware, seen at the settlement of Rinyo on Rousay. D.V. Clarke claimed in 1983 that his investigations at Rinyo had debunked this sequence. John Hedges is another primary proponent of what might be termed the "cultural coexistence" hypothesis, suggesting that although Unstan ware may predate grooved ware, the cultures associated with these styles of pottery lived side by side across Orkney for centuries. In this interpretation of the evidence, grooved ware is associated with the builders of the Maeshowe class of chambered tomb. The geographic distribution in Orkney of the two pottery types is as follows: grooved ware is found on Mainland, Sanday, and North Ronaldsay, with Unstan ware found on Mainland and the remaining islands, especially Rousay and Eday. Hedges sums up his view this way:

What is important is an understanding that the neolithic population of Orkney can be divided into two major parts on the basis of some elements of their material cultures. It is probable that they originated from different areas and...there is no difficulty in imagining their ability to coexist.

However, he also notes:

One point that should be made at the outset is that there is no discernable difference in the culture- in the social anthropological sense- of the Grooved Ware and Unstan Ware people...it is only apparent from limited aspects of material culture and the evidence...shows it to have been subordinate to a tribal level of unity which took in the whole of Orkney.

== See also ==
- Prehistoric Orkney
- Ring of Brodgar
- Standing Stones of Stenness
- Maeshowe
- World Heritage Sites in Scotland
- Timeline of prehistoric Scotland

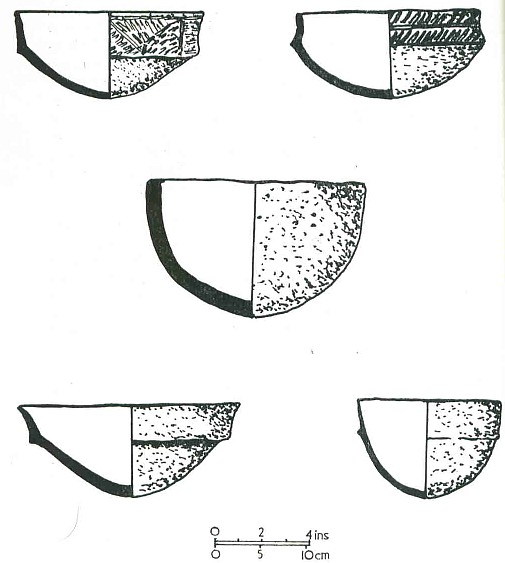
Unstan ware from Taversoe Tuick.
