= Wideford Hill chambered cairn =

Neolithic chambered cairn on Wideford Hill on Mainland, Orkney

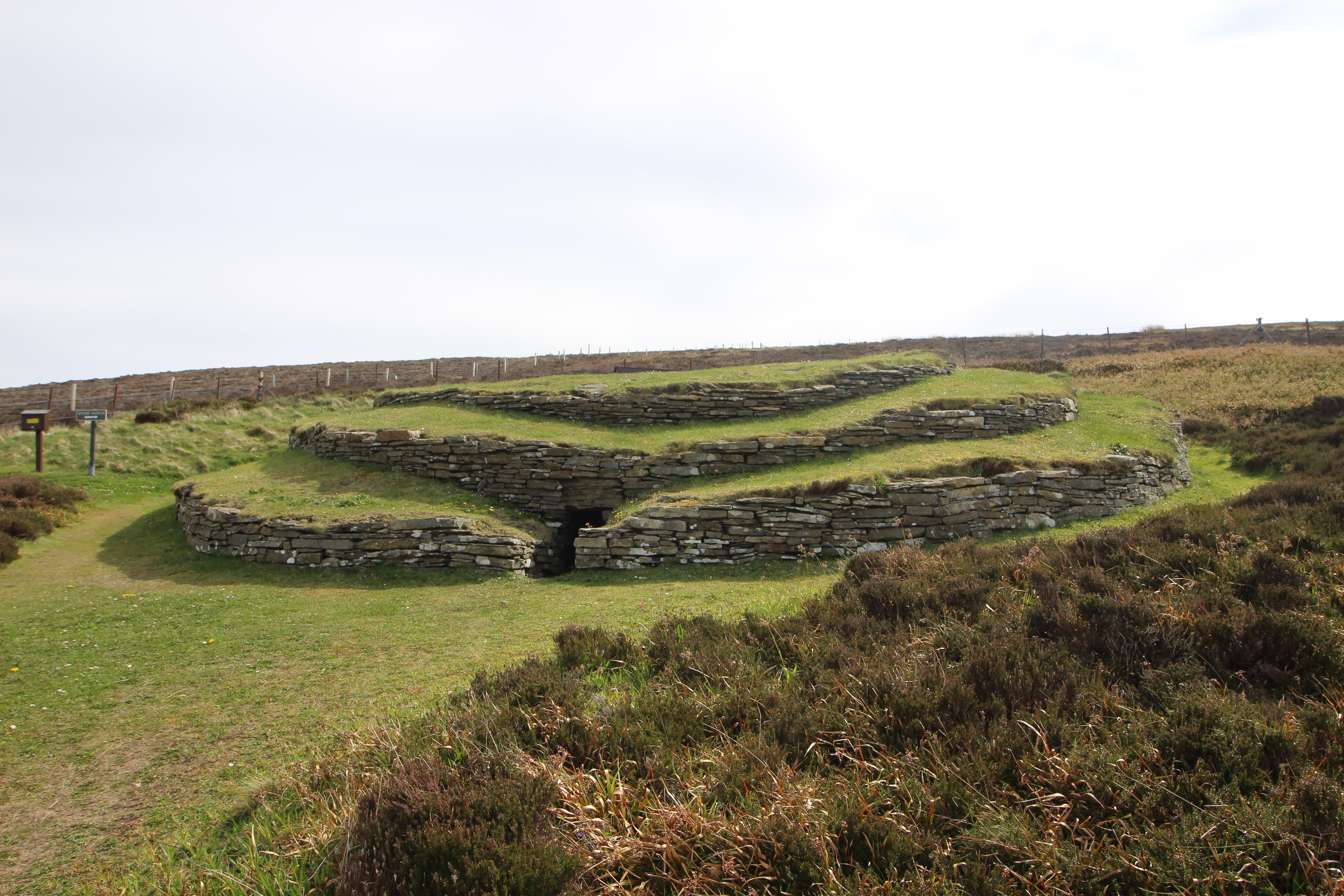
- Wideford Hill chambered cairn

- Location in Scotland
- 58°59′31″N 3°01′48″W
- Type: Chambered cairn
- Location: Scotland

History
- Built: c. 2000 BC

Site notes
- Owner: Historic Scotland
- Public access: Yes

Wideford Hill chambered cairn is a Neolithic chambered cairn on Mainland, Orkney in Scotland. The tomb dates to around 2000 BC, and is similar in design to the Maeshowe chambered cairn on Orkney. Historic Environment Scotland established the site as a scheduled monument in 1994.

== Description ==
The chambered cairn is located near Kirkwall on Mainland, Orkney in Scotland. The monument is situated on a steep west facing hill northwest of Wideford Hill and faces the Bays of Firth and Kirkwall. It is similar in design to the Maeshowe burial monument, also located on Mainland, Orkney. The visible masonry shows the different construction stages of the Neolithic cairn with its three concentric walls built on an earthen platform. The monument has a stepped facade, but the original shape was probably rounded or conical, with the stonework covered in clay and turf.

The monument was constructed on a steep slope and its entrance is on the west side. The entrance passage is low and narrow and takes up one third of the entire passage and is somewhat curved.

The inner passage, which is cut into the hill, is covered with lintel slabs and leads to a rectangular stone-lined chamber and three side chambers. The side chambers are corbelled. Entry to the tomb now is through a reconstructed concrete roof, completed during the 20th century BC.

== History ==
The tomb dates from the Neolithic era, around 2000 BC. The site was excavated in the 1840s by George Petrie. He did not uncover any human remains or other finds at the time and suggested that the burial monument had been filled with rubble and abandoned. The main chamber had been previously filled with rubble. Historic Environment Scotland established the site as a scheduled monument in 1994.

== Images ==
The cairn is on a hillside. Below is the view looking West. Access to the cairn is via a hatch in the top and steep metal ladder. A torch is recommended, and one is provided on site.

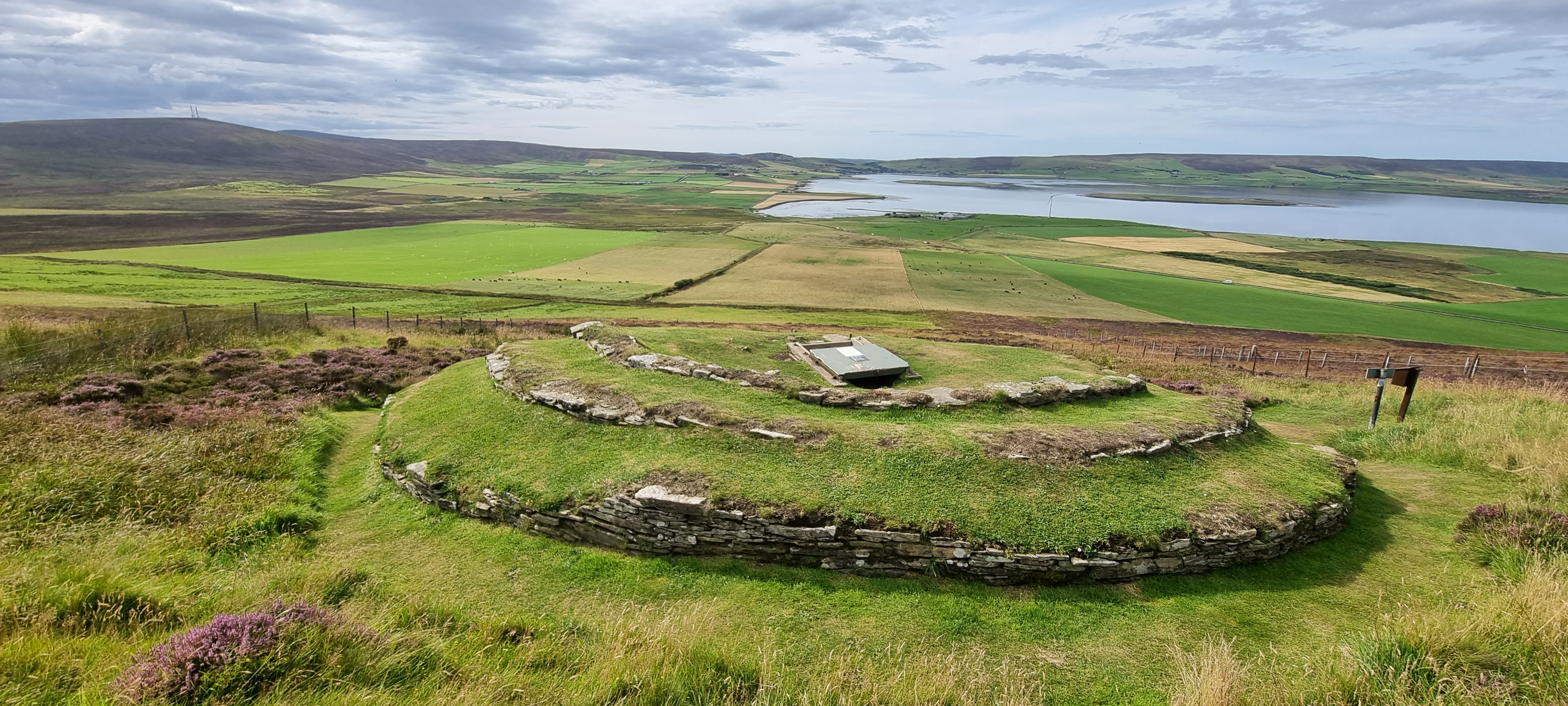
Wideford Hill chambered cairn

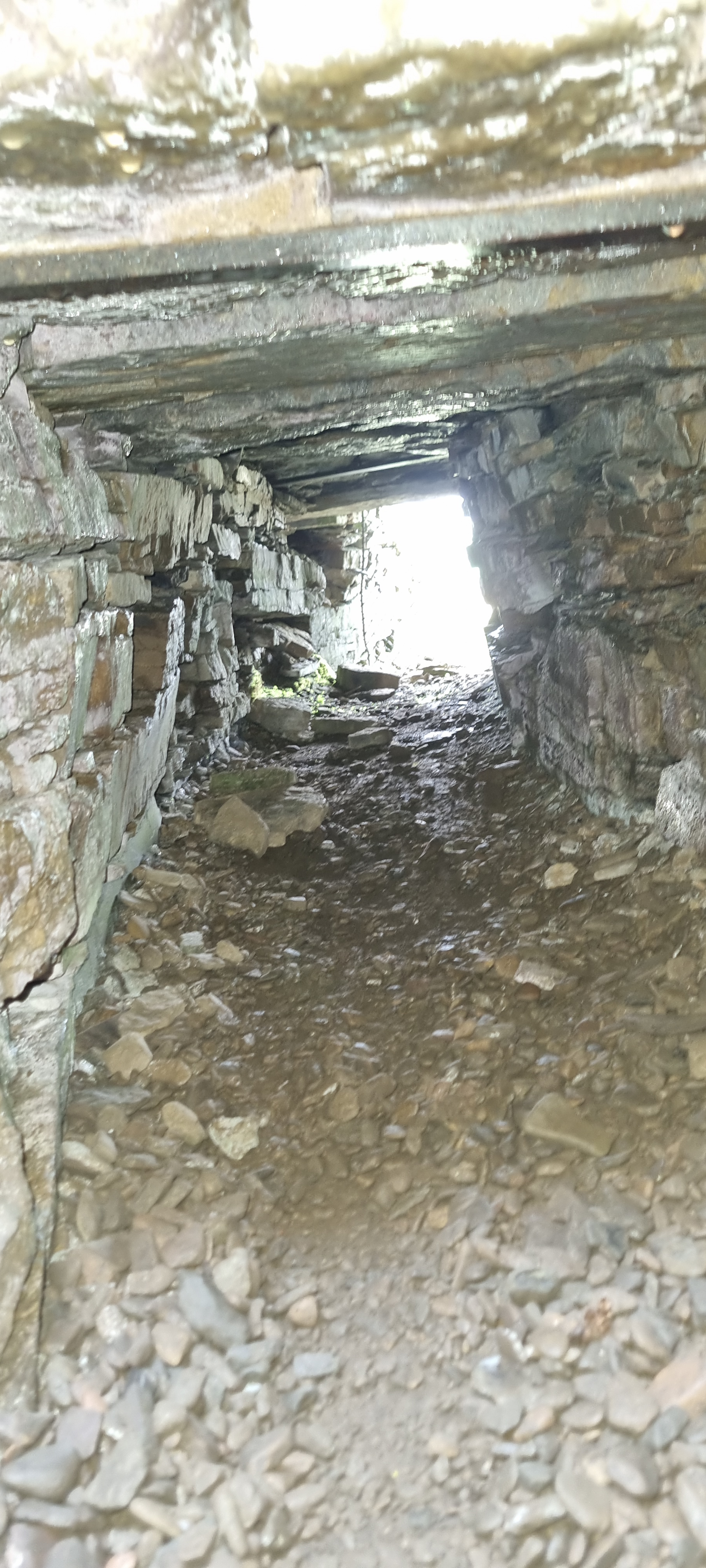
Wideford Hill chambered cairn original entrance looking outside

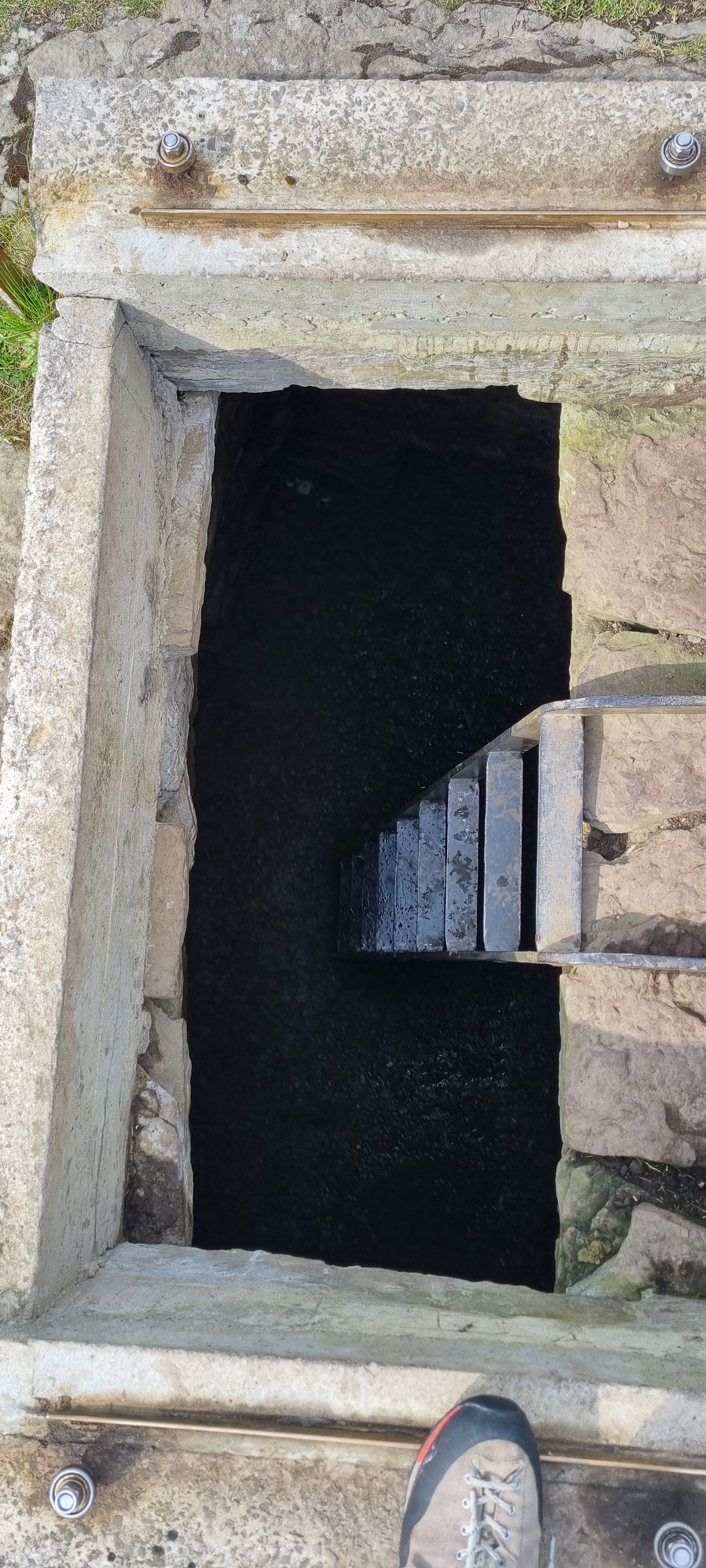
Wideford Hill chambered cairn entrance

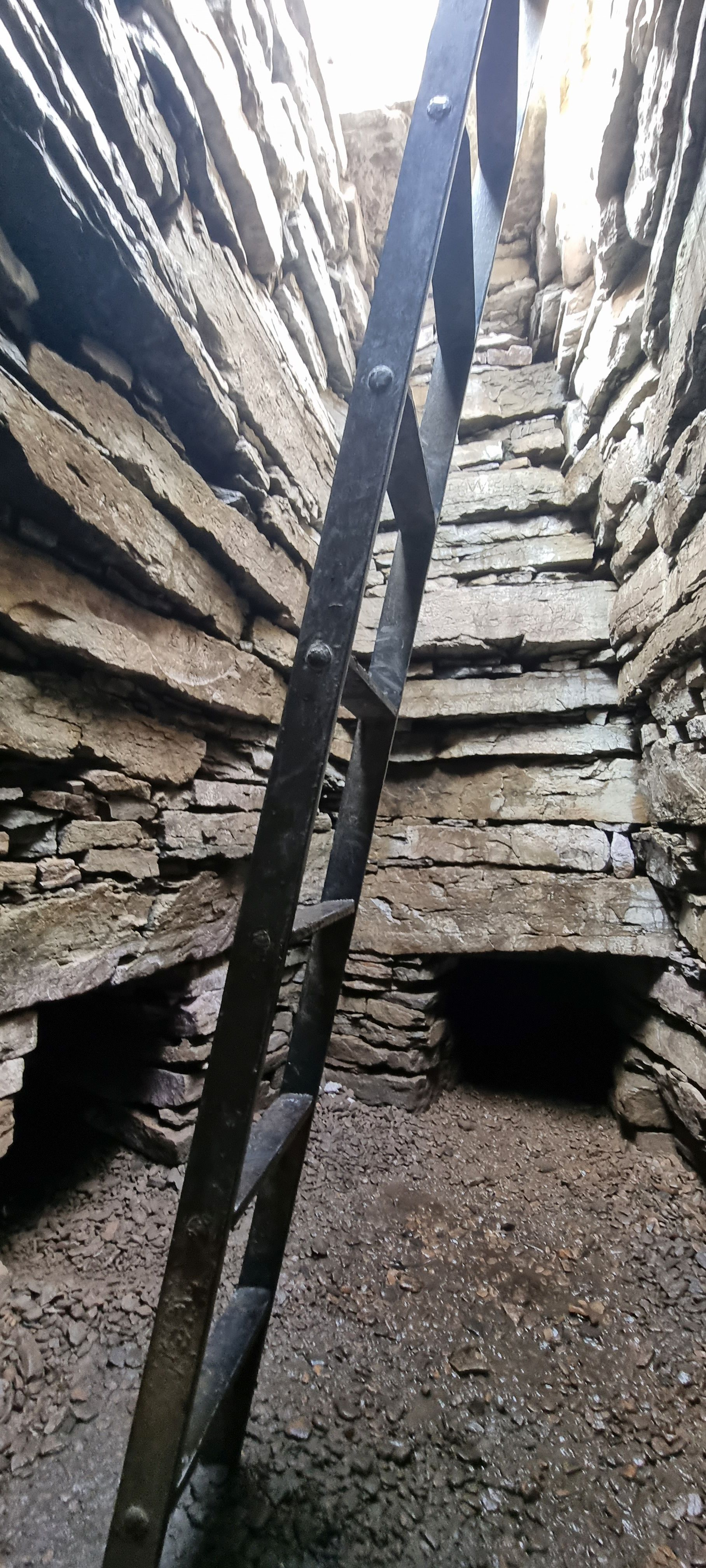
Wideford Hill chambered cairn entrance ladder

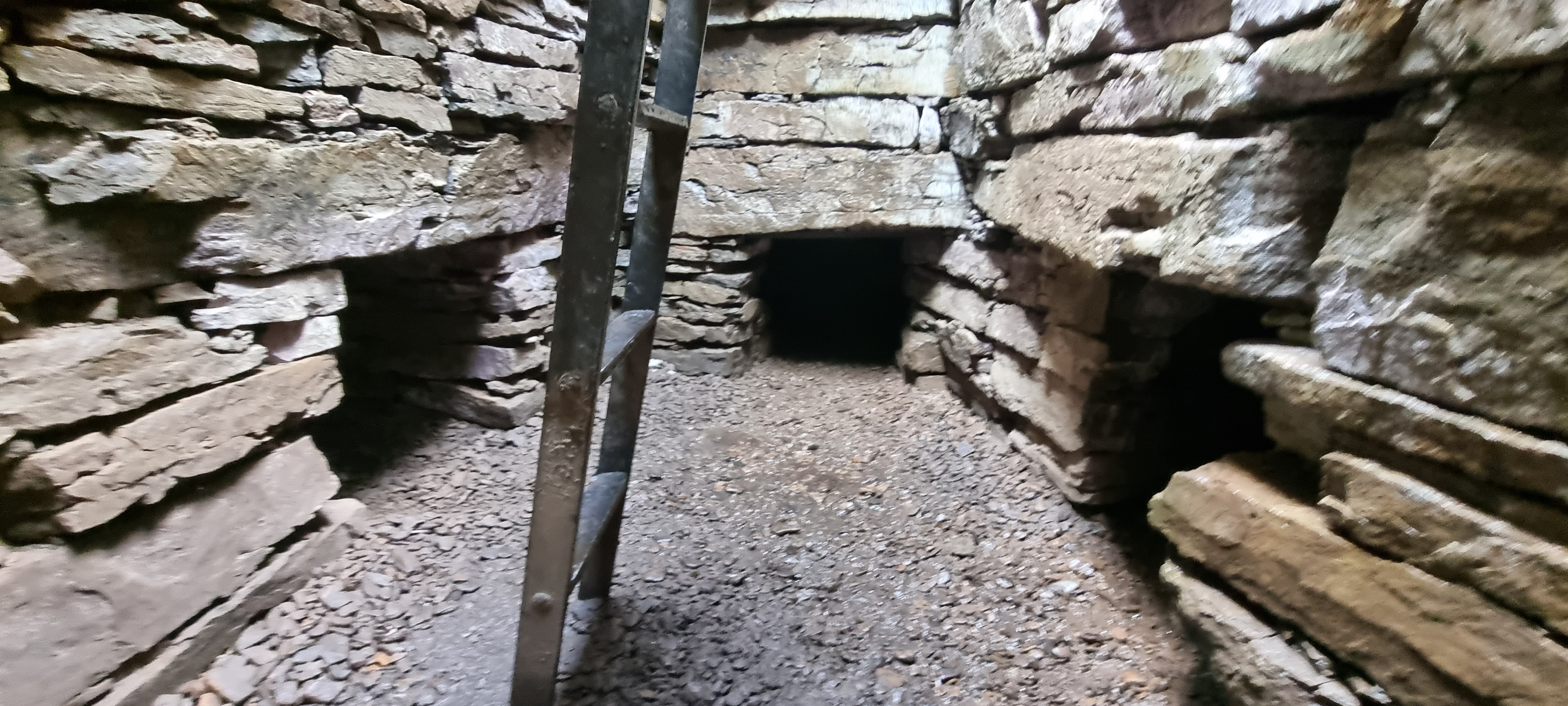
Wideford Hill chambered cairn side passages

== See also ==
- Cuween Hill Chambered Cairn
- Huntersquoy chambered cairn
- Vinquoy chambered cairn
