= Rinyo =

Coordinates: 59°10′24″N 2°58′56″W

Rinyo was a Neolithic settlement on Rousay in Orkney, Scotland. The site was discovered in the winter of 1937–38 on the lands of Bigland Farm in the north east of the island at grid reference HY439322.

The site was excavated in 1938 and 1946 by Vere Gordon Childe, who also excavated Skara Brae on Mainland Orkney, and by W. G. Grant. Finds included flint implements, stone axes and balls, pottery and a stone mace-head.

Over 100 archaeological sites have been identified on Rousay, including the complex of Midhowe Broch and Midhowe Chambered Cairn.
