= Midhowe Chambered Cairn =

Neolithic chambered cairn on Rousay, Orkney, Scotland

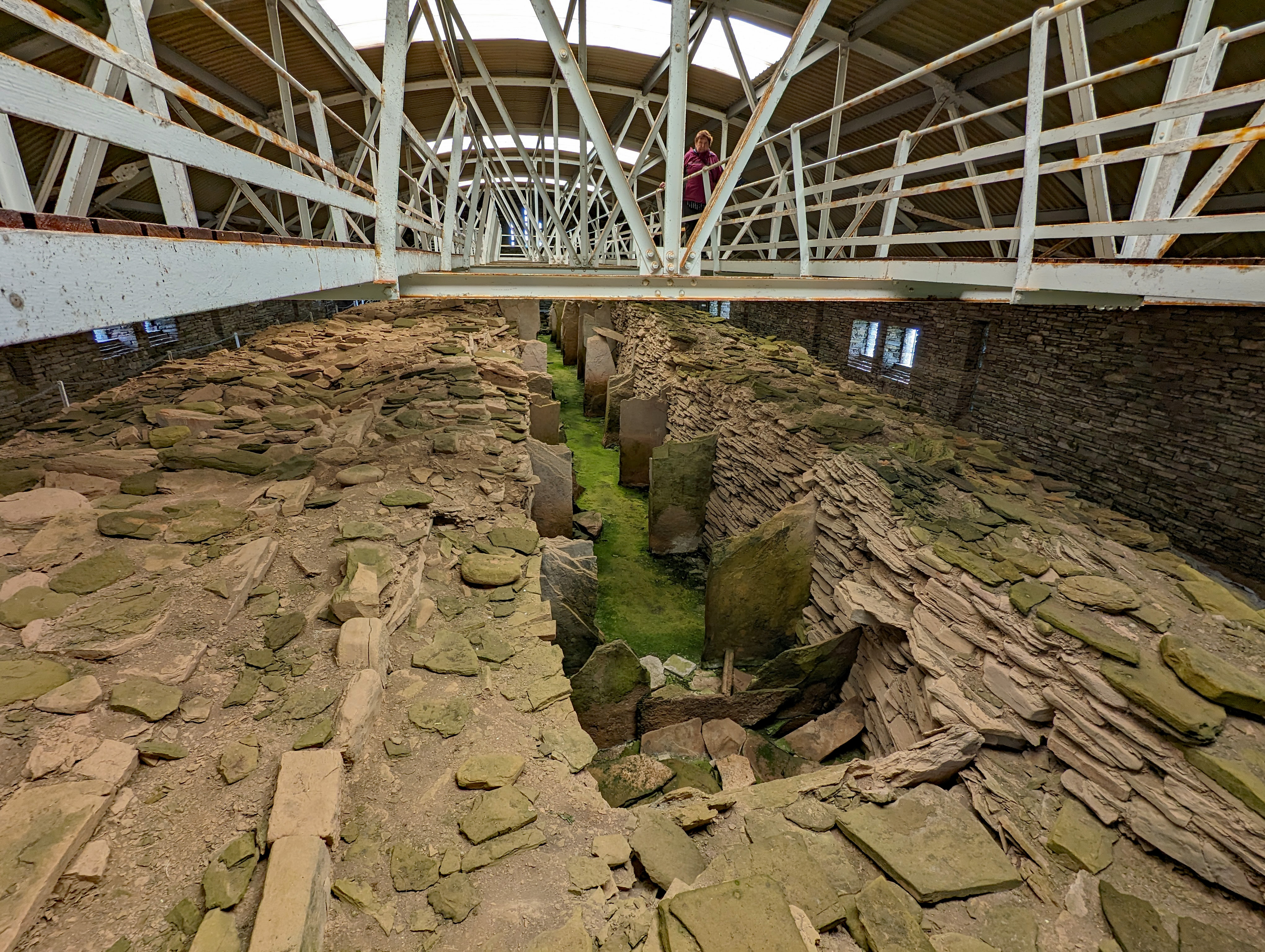
- The tomb in 2023
- Interactive map of Midhowe Chambered Cairn
- 59.1565°N 3.0991°W
- Type: Tomb
- Location: Scotland

History
- Built: c. 3500 BC

Site notes
- Material: Stone
- Height: c. 4 meters (original); 2.5 meters
- Length: 33 m (108 ft) 23.6 meters
- Width: 13 m (43 ft)

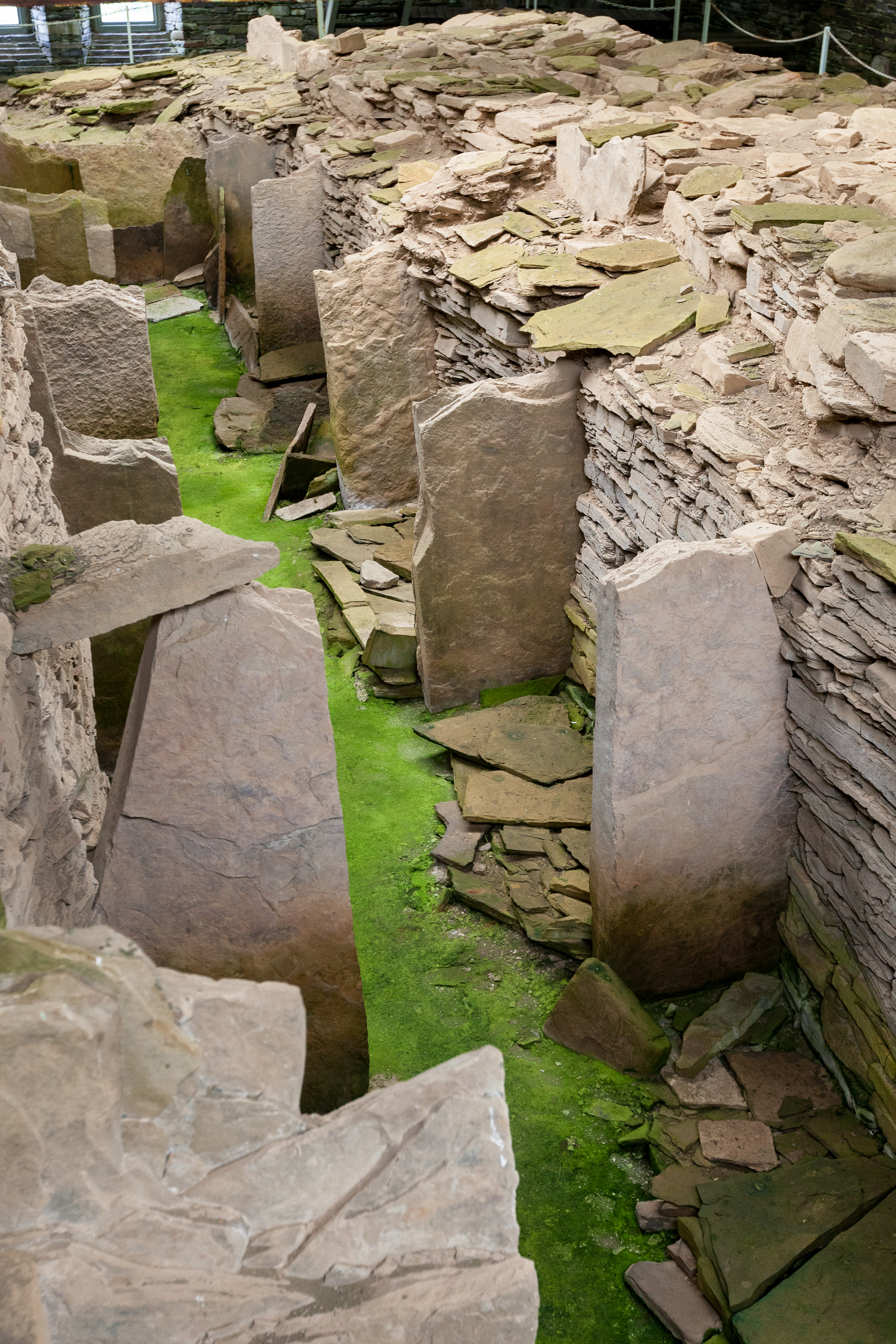
The tomb showing the individual stalls

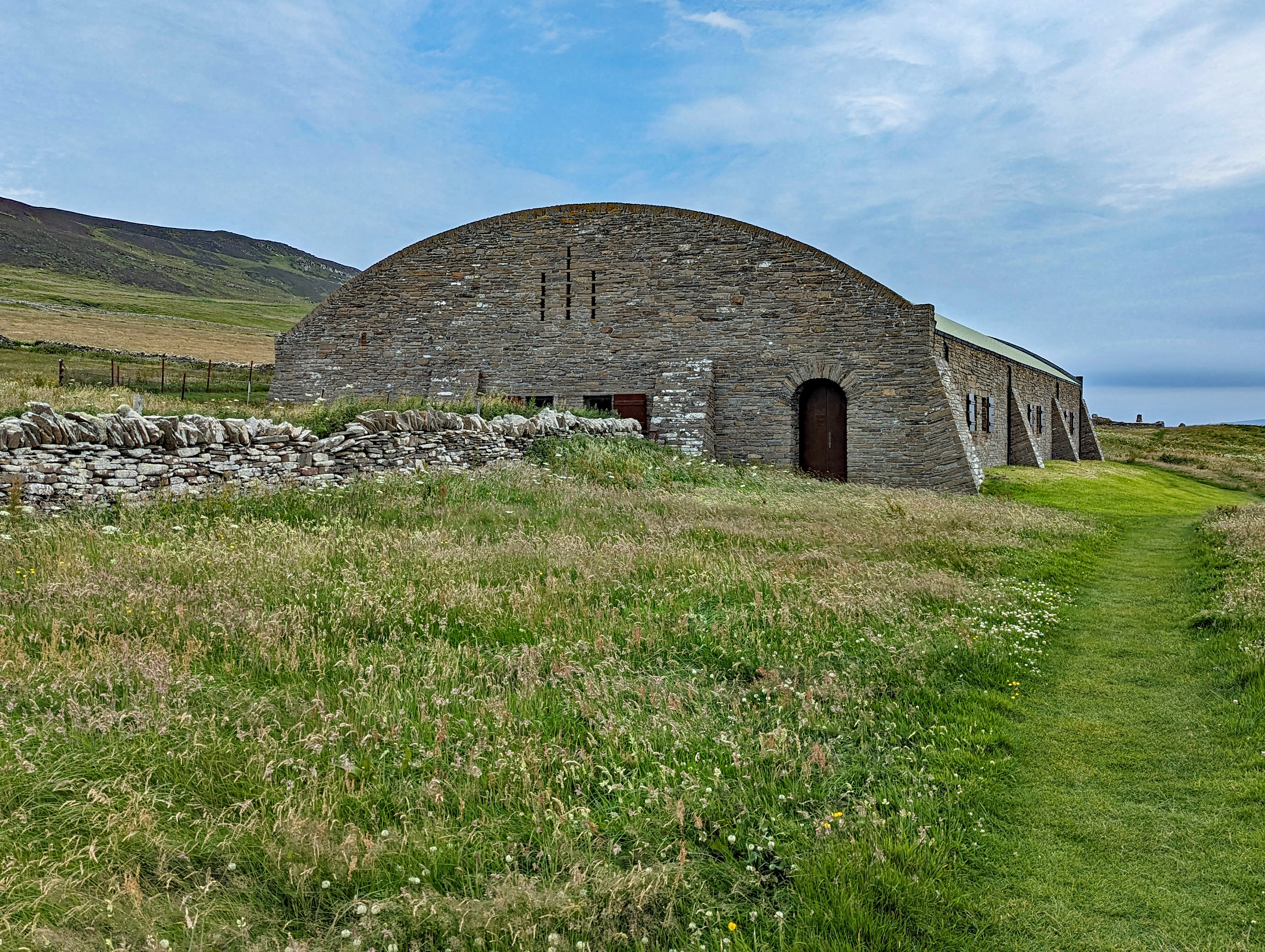
The building protecting the tomb

The Midhowe Chambered Cairn is a large Neolithic chambered cairn located on the south shore of the island of Rousay, Orkney, Scotland. The name "Midhowe" comes from the Iron Age broch known as Midhowe Broch, that lies just west of the tomb.

The broch got its name from the fact that it is the middle of three such structures that lie grouped within 500 metres (1,600 ft) of each other and Howe from the Old Norse word haugr meaning mound or barrow. Together, the broch and chambered cairn form part of a large complex of ancient structures on the shore of Eynhallow Sound separating Rousay from Mainland, Orkney.

== Tomb Description ==
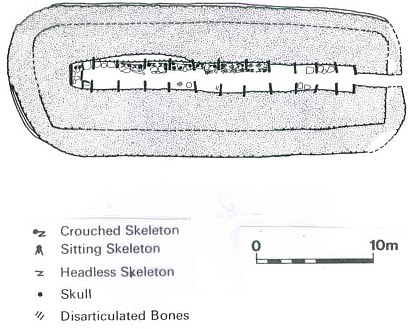
Distribution of burials in Midhowe Chambered Cairn.

The tomb is a particularly well preserved example of the Orkney-Cromarty type of chambered cairn. Tombs of this type are often referred to as "stalled" cairns due to their distinctive internal structure. Stalled cairns have a central passageway flanked by a series of paired transverse stones that separate the side spaces into compartments that reminded early investigators of horse stalls. The earliest versions of this tomb type are found in Caithness, and they typically consist of no more than four stalled compartments. In Orkney, the tombs became more elaborate;

Midhowe is an extreme example of the form with twelve chambers flanking a passageway 23.6 metres (77 ft) in length. The transverse stones rise to a height of 2 metres (6.6 ft) and the walls still rise to a height of 2.5 metres (8.2 ft). Like most tombs in Orkney, the original roof is gone, replaced by a modern hangar-like structure that protects the site. The nature of the original roof is unclear; it may have consisted of flat slabs of flagstone at a height of 3 metres (9.8 ft) or more. Alternatively, it may have been vaulted like Maeshowe to a height of as much as 5 metres (16 ft). The cairn appears to have been intentionally filled with debris after hundreds of years of usage beginning early in the third millennium BC. The size and complexity of the interior of the cairn must have exerted a powerful influence on those entering it. Castleden describes it this way:

Walking into the monument is a little like walking into a miniature church, the straight central aisle flanked on each side by pillar-like slabs and culminating in a shrine-like end compartment at the western end. The stalls or bays on the north side of the chamber were fitted with low stone benches or shelves on which the bones of ancestors were laid out.

The cairn was originally protected by an oval barrow 33 metres (108 ft) long and 13 metres (43 ft) wide. The barrow is supported by three concentric stone casing walls that appear to have overlapped each other to form a step-like structure. Some of the stones in the walls are laid at angles to each other, forming decorative patterns that echo the incised rims found on some Unstan ware bowls, examples of which were found in the tomb. These patterns are clearly part of the architectural design of the walls, meant to be seen. Unstan ware is named after the Unstan Chambered Cairn on the Mainland of the Orkney Islands. Unstan, where the style of pottery was first found in 1884, is a fine example of a stalled chambered tomb, encased like Midhowe in a circular barrow. Unstan ware is mostly found in tombs, specifically tombs of the Orkney-Cromarty type. These include the so-called Tomb of the Eagles at Isbister on South Ronaldsay, and Taversoe Tuick and Knowe of Yarso on Rousay.

Midhowe is distinguished from other tombs of its type by having a horned forecourt adjacent to the long axis of the barrow on the north side. Extension of the curvature of the surviving "horns" of the structure suggests an original diameter of as much as 70 metres (230 ft), indicating a ceremonial space capable of holding hundreds of people.

Midhowe represents an example of collective burial common to the Orkney-Cromarty tombs. The remains of at least 25 individuals were discovered in the tomb. Seven of the twelve chambers have side shelves- the bodies were found in groups of two to four on six of the shelves. Several of the skeletons were in a crouched position on the shelves, with their backs to the side wall and heads resting against the supporting pillars. Other groups of bones had been heaped into the centers of the shelves or swept under them, suggesting that earlier burials had been moved to accommodate later ones. In a few cases only the skulls were present, in one instance the long bones had been piled together with the skull placed on top.

Bones from a variety of animals were found as well. These include ox, sheep, skua, cormorant, buzzard, eagle, gannet, and carrion-crow. Fish bones from bream and wrasse were also present. Bream are not found this far north today, suggesting that the waters around Orkney during the Neolithic must have been several degrees warmer than today.

== See also ==
- Ring of Brodgar
- Standing Stones of Stenness
- Maeshowe
- Prehistoric Orkney
- Timeline of prehistoric Scotland
- Oldest buildings in the United Kingdom

== Sources ==
- Castleden, Rodney (1987). The Stonehenge People: An Exploration of Life in Neolithic Britain 4700-2000 BC. London: Routledge & Kegan Paul Ltd. ISBN 978-0-7102-0968-9.
- Childe, V. Gordon; W. Douglas Simpson (1952). Illustrated History of Ancient Monuments: Vol. VI Scotland. Edinburgh: Her Majesty's Stationery Office.
- Hedges, John W. (1984). Tomb of the Eagles: Death and Life in a Stone Age Tribe. New York: New Amsterdam. ISBN 978-0-941533-05-8.
- Henshall, Audrey (1985). The Chambered Cairns, in: Renfrew, Colin (Ed.) The Prehistory of Orkney BC 4000–1000 AD. Edinburgh: Edinburgh University Press. ISBN 978-0-85224-456-2.
- Laing, Lloyd (1974). Orkney and Shetland: An Archaeological Guide. Newton Abbott: David and Charles Ltd. ISBN 978-0-7153-6305-8.
- Ritchie, Graham & Anna (1981). Scotland: Archaeology and Early History. New York: Thames and Hudson. ISBN 978-0-500-27365-4.
- Ritchie, Anna (1995). Prehistoric Orkney. London: B.T. Batsford Ltd. ISBN 978-0-7134-7593-7.
