= Unstan Chambered Cairn =

Neolithic chambered cairn

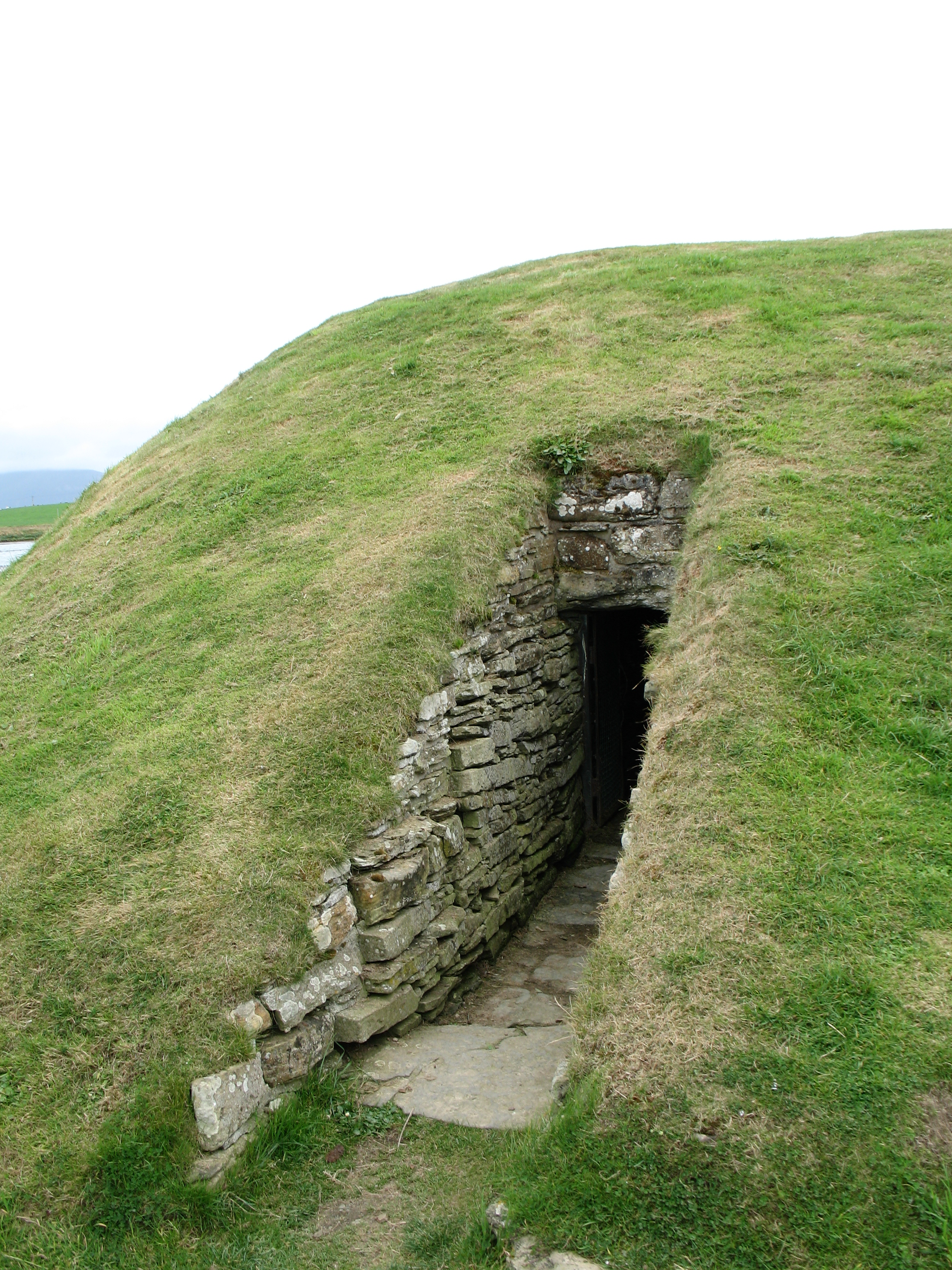
- Entrance to Unstan Chambered Cairn

- Location within Orkney Islands
- 58.9866°N 3.2494°W
- Type: Neolithic chambered cairn
- Periods: Neolithic
- Location: Mainland, Orkney, Scotland

History
- Built: c. 3100 BC

Site notes
- Material: Stone
- Public access: Yes

Scheduled monument
- Reference no.: SM90232

Unstan (or Onstan, or Onston) is a Neolithic chambered cairn located about 2 mi (3 km) north-east of Stromness on Mainland, Orkney, Scotland. The tomb was built on a promontory that extends into the Loch of Stenness near the settlement of Howe. Unstan is notable as an atypical hybrid of the two main types of chambered cairn found in Orkney, and as the location of the first discovery of a type of pottery that now bears the name of the tomb. The site is in the care of Historic Environment Scotland as a scheduled monument.

== Description ==
The tomb is a particularly well preserved, and somewhat unusual, example of an Orkney–Cromarty chambered cairn. Tombs of this type are often referred to as "stalled" cairns due to their distinctive internal structure. Stalled cairns have a central passageway flanked by a series of paired transverse stones that separate the side spaces into compartments that reminded early investigators of horse stalls. The earliest versions of this tomb type are found in Caithness, they typically consist of no more than four stalled compartments. In Orkney, the tombs became increasingly elaborate; the number of compartments reached a maximum of fourteen at the Knowe of Ramsay on Rousay. Unstan is a more modest example of the form with five chambers flanking a passageway 6.4 m (21 ft) in length. Like most tombs in Orkney, the original roof is gone, replaced by a modern concrete dome that protects the site. The remaining walls rise to a height of almost 2 m (6.6 ft), and consist primarily of thin stacked slabs of local flagstone that come from the Devonian Old Red Sandstone.

Unstan is an atypical example of the Orkney–Cromarty chambered cairn in several respects. First, the barrow, or burial mound, that covered the tomb is circular, 13 m (43 ft) in diameter, rather than the usual oblong or rectangular form. Second, the barrow is round because the tomb contains a side chamber, a feature more common in the Maeshowe-type tombs. Third, the main chamber does not open at the end of the passageway, like typical stalled tombs, but along one long side. Again, this is more characteristic of the Maeshowe tombs. The barrow is made of two or three concentric rows of stonework.

Evidence from nearby tombs suggests that they, and Unstan, were built sometime between 3400 and 2800 BC.

Unstan is also notable in that the first discovery of a distinctive style of pottery was made here in 1884. These pots are the type examples of what has come to be known as Unstan ware. Unstan ware typically consists of elegant shallow bowls with a band of grooved patterning below the rim, created using a technique known as "stab-and-drag". A second version consists of undecorated, round-bottomed bowls. Some of the bowls had bits of volcanic rock included in the clay to make them stronger. After firing, bone tools were used to burnish the surfaces to make them shiny and impermeable. Parts of twenty to thirty bowls were found in the tomb, many of them were Unstan ware. Most of the bowls were shattered or incomplete; this is common in chambered cairns and suggests that the vessels were intentionally broken for inclusion with the dead. These bowls were not newly created for use in the tomb – they had clearly seen prior use – as some of the sherds, for example, had impressions of barley grains. A number of fragments were found in a shallow hollow in the clay floor – a pattern seen in other tombs. Several of the reconstructed vessels are in the National Museum of Scotland.

Human remains were found in Unstan – there were two crouched skeletons in the side cell, several more in the main compartment, and a number of bones were scattered throughout the rest of the tomb. Animal bones and charcoal were found as well.

It is possible that Unstan was in use well into the second millennium BC; an arrowhead was discovered in the tomb that is characteristic of the Beaker People who lived from the Late Neolithic into the Bronze Age. Moreover, burials in the crouched position were not practiced in the Neolithic.

The current concrete dome dates to the 1930s.

== Toponymy ==
The second element of the name, stan, or ston, comes from a particularly Orcadian version of the Norse word stadr which means a farm settlement.

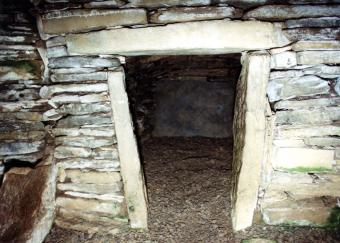
Entrance to Unstan Chambered Cairn main passageway

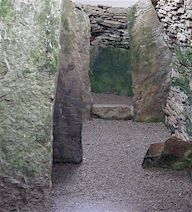
Main passageway, interior of Unstan Chambered Cairn

== See also ==
- Midhowe Chambered Cairn
- Unstan ware
- Ring of Brodgar
- Standing Stones of Stenness
- Maeshowe
- Prehistoric Orkney
- Timeline of prehistoric Scotland
- Oldest buildings in the United Kingdom
