= Cuween Hill Chambered Cairn =

Neolithic chambered cairn on Mainland in the islands of Orkney

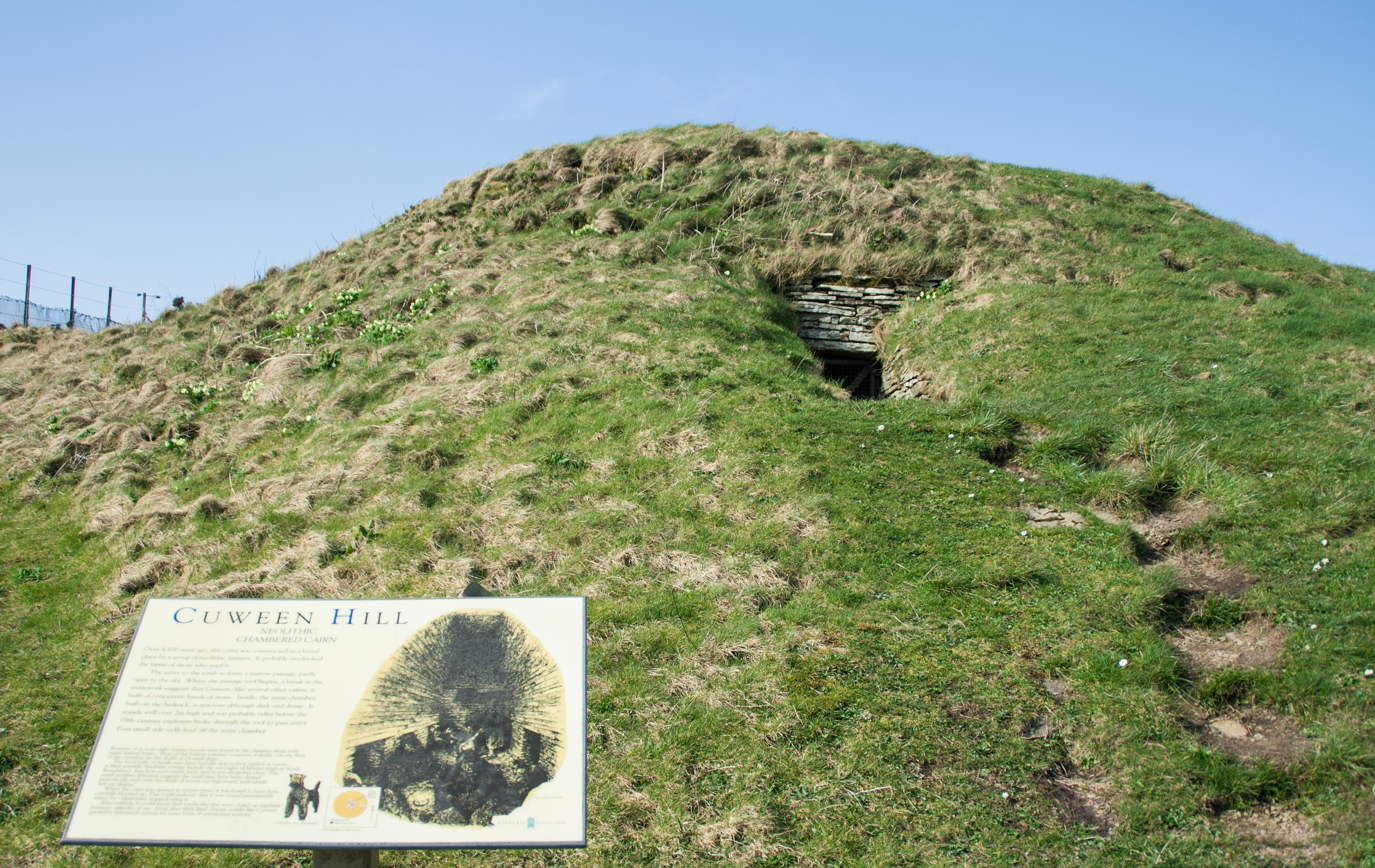
- Cuween Hill, front external view

- Location in Scotland, United Kingdom
- 58°59′50″N 3°06′29″W
- Type: Chambered cairn
- Periods: Neolithic
- Location: Mainland, Scotland

History
- Built: c. 3000 BC

Site notes
- Height: c. 2 meters
- Owner: Historic Scotland
- Public access: Yes

Cuween Hill Chambered Cairn (grid reference HY364127) is a Neolithic chambered cairn on Mainland, the main island of Orkney, Scotland, about 6 miles west of Kirkwall. It dates to around 3000 BC, and is similar in design to Maeshowe, but on a smaller scale. It was constructed by Neolithic farmers as a burial place.

The cairn was excavated in 1901 and the remains of several humans and dogs were found, including skulls. In the 1990s, excavations uncovered the remains of a small Neolithic settlement at Stonehall, at the foot of Cuween Hill, and in 2019 images of a forensic model of one of the dog skulls were published.

== Description ==
The entry to the tomb is down a narrow passage, partly open to the sky. The main chamber, built on the bedrock, stands well over 2 meters high, and was probably taller before 19th century explorers broke through the roof to gain entry. The roof has been replaced with a modern one. Four small side-cells lead off the main chamber.

Remains of at least eight human burials were found in the chamber along with many animal bones. Most of the human remains consisted of skulls. On the floor of the chamber lay the skulls of 24 small dogs. The discovery of the dog skulls has led to suggestions that the local tribe or family may have had the dog as their symbol or totem. The small number of burials suggests the tomb may have been cleared periodically with only the skulls of recent (or important) individuals left on display.

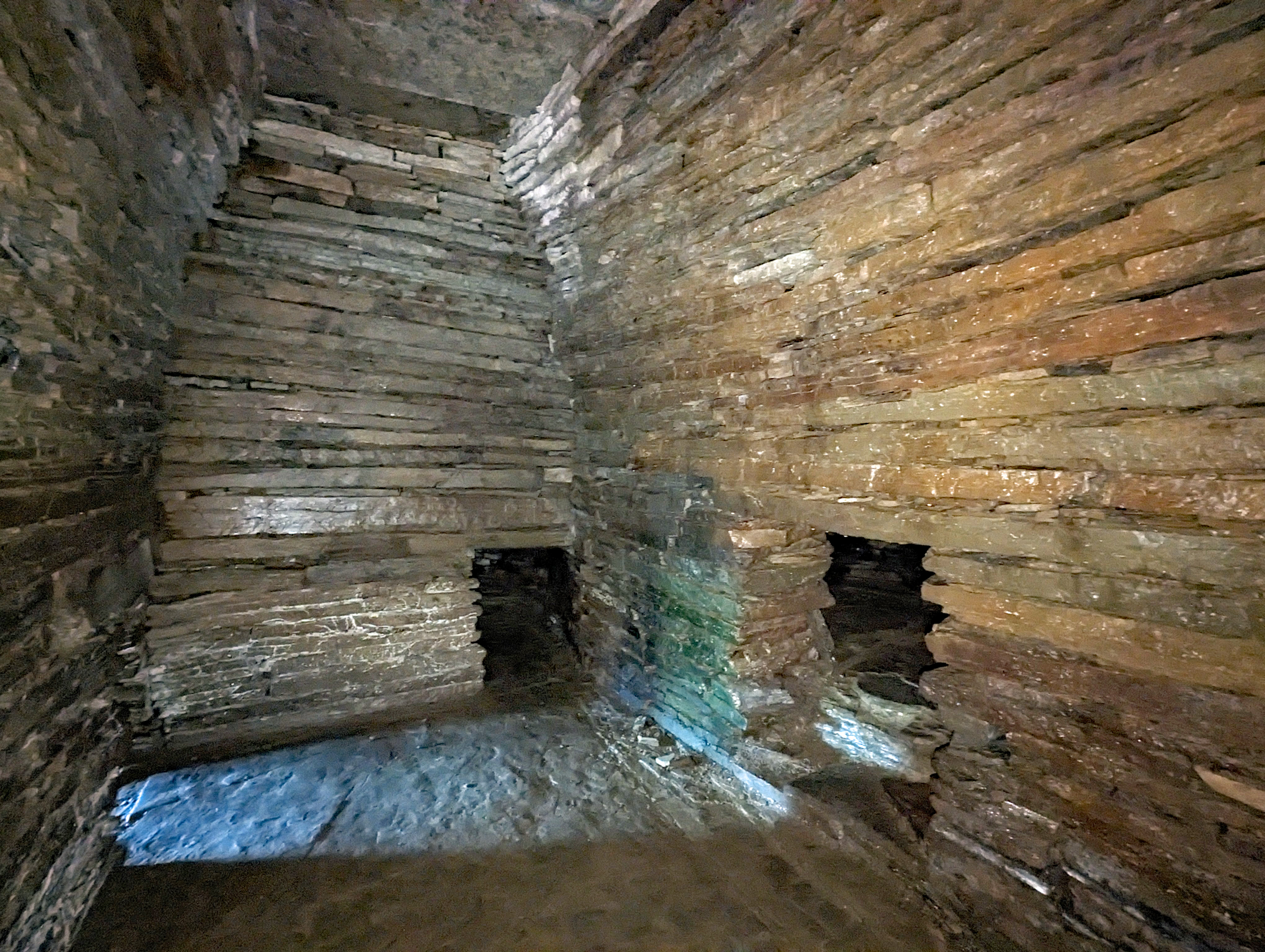
Cairn interior

When the cairn was opened in recent times, it was found to have been carefully blocked up. This could indicate that it was closed permanently when the community stopped using it, or it could mean that tombs like this were closed up regularly between episodes of use.

Access to the cairn is on foot, through the original entrance. Visitors will need to crawl through the passage on their hands and knees. There is enough room inside to stand, but the light is limited. The cairn was excavated in 1901, and it is in the care of Historic Environment Scotland. The roof is now a modern concrete dome.

In the 1990s, excavations uncovered the remains of a small Neolithic settlement at Stonehall, below the cairn at the foot of Cuween Hill.

== Dog's head forensic reconstruction ==
On 22 April 2019, Sci-News.com published an image showing the forensic reconstructions of one of the dog skulls.

Scientists at Edinburgh University's Royal (Dick) School of Veterinary Studies CT-scanned one of the canine skulls, enabling forensic artist Amy Thornton to make a model of the dog's head based on a 3D print of it. “The reconstruction was... finished with the fur coat resembling a European grey wolf, as advised by experts."

“The size of a large collie, and with features reminiscent of that of a European grey wolf, the Cuween dog has much to tell us, not only about ceremonial practices and the symbolic significance of the dog in Late Neolithic Orkney but also about the appearance of domestic dogs in the third millennium BC,” said Dr. Alison Sheridan, Principal Archaeological Research Curator in the Department of Scottish History and Archaeology at National Museums Scotland. “While reconstructions have previously been made of people from the Neolithic era, we do not know of any previous attempt to forensically reconstruct an animal from this time.”

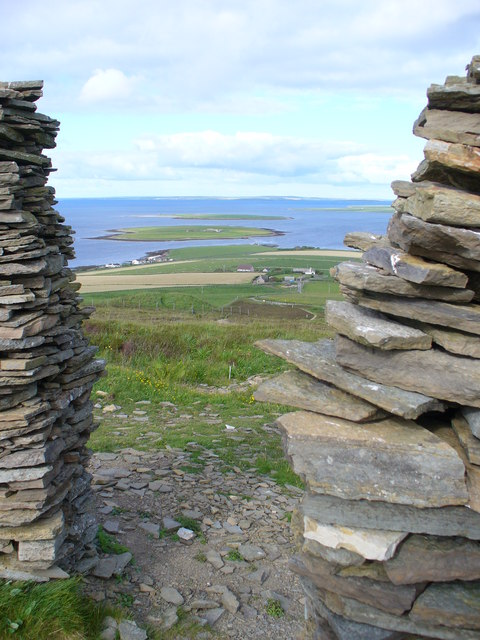
Bay of Firth viewed from between "Stone Men" on Cuween Hill

== See also ==
- Timeline of prehistoric Scotland
- Oldest buildings in the United Kingdom
