= Vinquoy chambered cairn =

Neolithic chambered cairn on Eday in the islands of Orkney

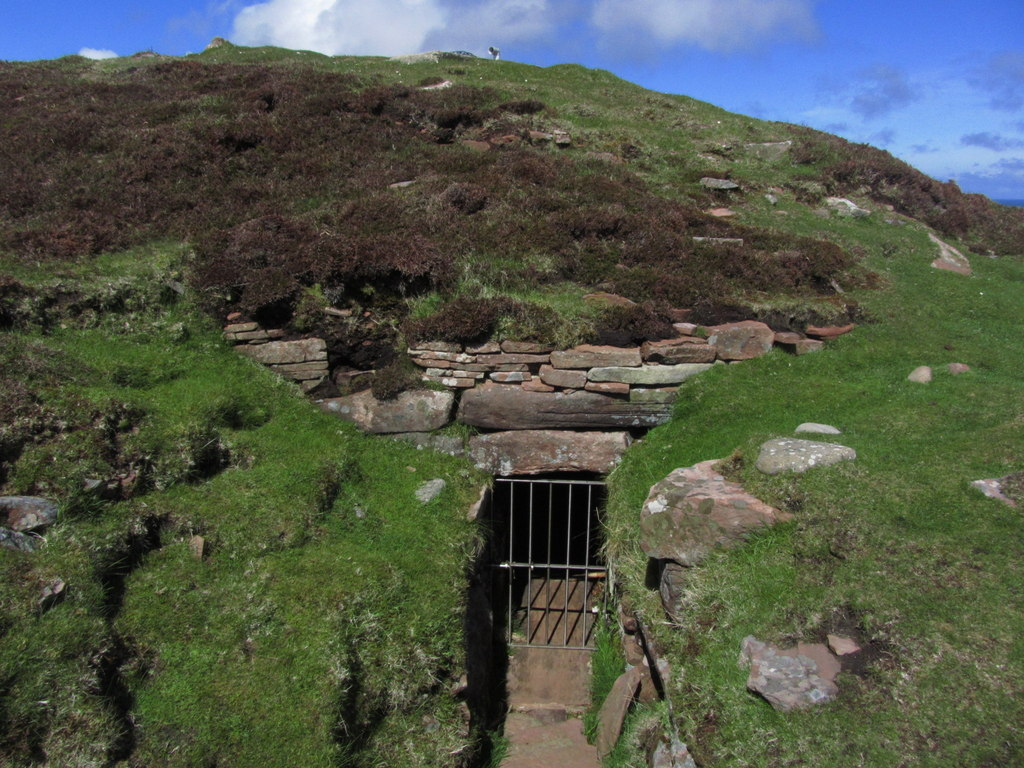
- The chambered cairn in 2013

- Location in Scotland
- 59°13′38″N 2°46′21″W
- Type: Chambered cairn
- Periods: Neolithic
- Location: Eday, Scotland

History
- Built: c. 2750 BC

Site notes
- Material: Sandstone
- Height: c. 3 meters
- Diameter: c. 18 meters
- Owner: Historic Scotland
- Public access: Yes

Vinquoy chambered cairn (grid reference HY56013809) is a Neolithic chambered cairn located on the island of Eday in Orkney, Scotland. The tomb probably dates to the early third millennium BC, and is similar in design to Maeshowe Neolithic tomb found on Mainland Orkney. Historic Environment Scotland established the site as a scheduled monument in 1936.

== Description ==
Vinquoy chambered cairn is a restored Maeshowe-type Neolithic tomb on the island of Eday in Orkney, Scotland. The monument was built on the highest point in the island, on Vinquoy Hill on the North side of Eday, overlooking Calf Sound. The tomb is around 18 m (59 ft) in diameter with a height of 3 m (9.8 ft), and was constructed with red sandstone. It has a 5 m (16 ft) entrance passage leading to a central chamber with four small side-cells. The chambered cairn is partly below ground, carved into the hill. The central chamber originally had a corbelled roof. The site is open to the public and is part of the Eday Heritage Trail.

== History ==
The tomb was first excavated in 1857 by antiquarian James Farrer and landowner Robert Fraser Hebden, who dug into the chamber through the top of the mound. According to the 1878 journal of the Society of Antiquarians of Scotland, Hebden, who bought his Eday estate in 1850, "made considerable antiquarian researches over the island from time to time at his own expense; but although the property abounds in ancient tumuli, nothing of interest was discovered beyond a few flint flakes, some human skulls, and a sculptured stone which he presented to the Museum".

The tomb most likely dates to the early third millennium BC, because of its similar design to Maeshowe Neolithic chambered tomb on Mainland Orkney, which dates to around 2800 BC. Vinquoy chambered cairn was originally scheduled by Historic Scotland in 1936.
