= Aikerness Bay =

Bay in the Orkney Islands, Scotland

Coordinates: 59.121°N 3.094°W

Aikerness Bay is an embayment of Eynhallow Sound on the northwest coast of Mainland Orkney, Scotland. The headlands of Point of Hellia at the east and Grit Ness at the west form the limit points of Aikerness Bay. The beach along the southern boundary of Aikerness Bay is known as the Sands of Evie. At the eastern end of Aikerness Bay is Gurness, an Iron Age broch.

== See also ==
- Evie, Orkney
