= Costa Head =

Headland of Scotland

Coordinates: 59.153°N 3.199°W

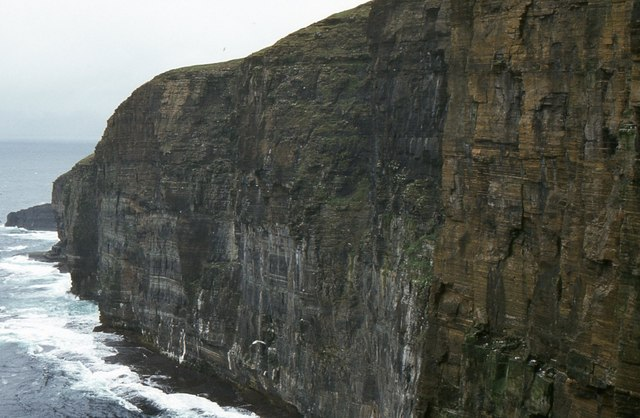
Costa Head

Costa Head is a prominent headland on Eynhallow Sound on the northwestern coast of the Orkney Mainland, Scotland. The tidal indraught of Eynhallow Sound is "scarcely felt beyond a line joining Costa Head and the Reef of Quendale". To the east is the Point of Hellia on which is located the Broch of Gurness, an Iron Age promontory fort. Gurness' drystone construction of the "round tower fort is flanked by a number of ancillary structures and impressive concentric ditch and rampart outer defences; moreover, the rocky shoreline cliffs posed a formidable approach for marine invaders."

== See also ==
- Brough of Birsay
- Evie, Orkney
