= Sands of Evie =

Beach in the Orkney Islands, Scotland

Coordinates: 59.1195°N 3.0888°W

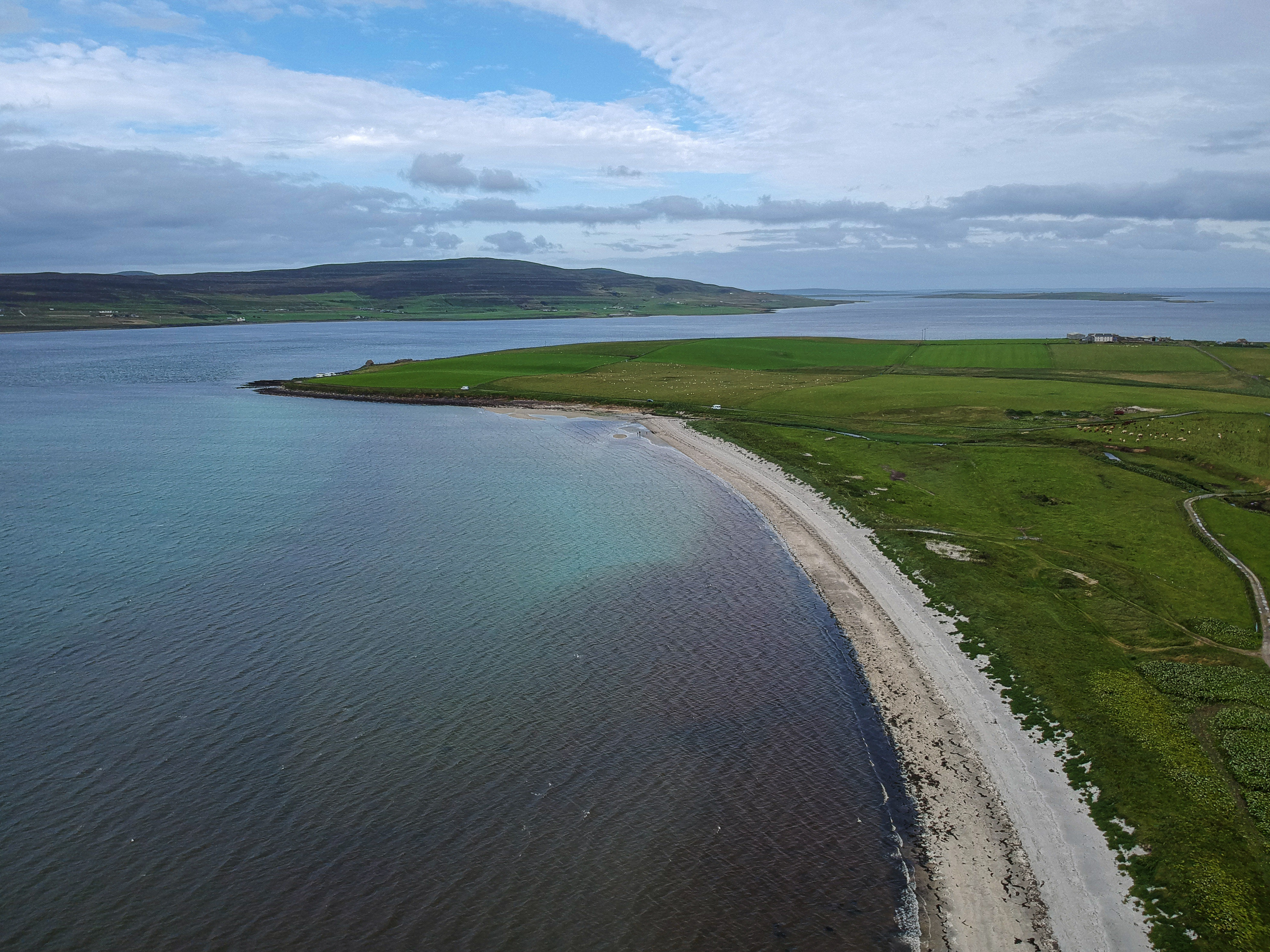
Sands of Evie from above, with the island Rousay in the background

The Sands of Evie is a sandy beach landform near the village of Evie on Mainland Orkney, Scotland, protected by the Point of Hellia headland. This beach forms the southern boundary of Aikerness Bay, an element of Eynhallow Sound. Immediately to the east is Gurness, a rather well-preserved Iron Age broch. A Pictish slab was discovered on the Sands of Evie in 1967 and is now housed in Orkney Museum.

== See also ==
- Costa Head
