= Brinian =

Coordinates: 59.132°N 2.988°W

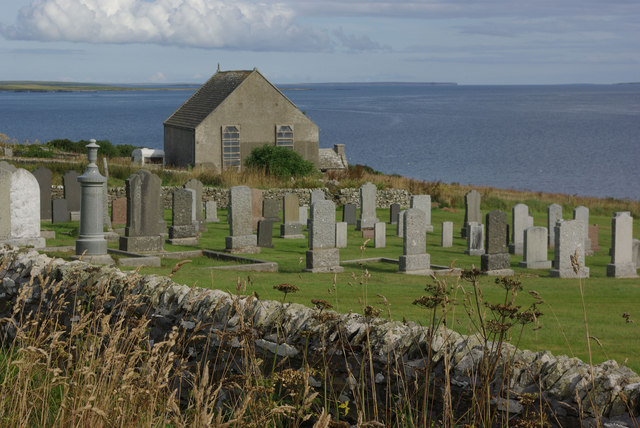
- Brinian cemetery and kirk, beside Wyre Sound

- Location within Orkney
- OS grid reference: HY434276
- Civil parish: Rousay and Egilsay
- Council area: Orkney
- Lieutenancy area: Orkney
- Country: Scotland
- Sovereign state: United Kingdom
- Post town: ORKNEY
- Postcode district: KW17
- Dialling code: 01856
- Police: Scotland
- Fire: Scottish
- Ambulance: Scottish
- UK Parliament: Orkney and Shetland
- Scottish Parliament: Orkney

Brinian is a village on the island of Rousay, in Orkney, Scotland. Trumland is situated to the west of the village, with Taversöe Tuick nearby. Brinian is within the parish of Rousay and Egilsay.
