= Eliza D'Oyly Burroughs =

British archaeologist (1849–1908)

- Born: 9 May 1849; Leamington Priors, Warwickshire, England
- Died: 1 February 1908 (aged 58); London, England
- Burial place: London, England
- Occupation: Archaeologist
- Spouse: Sir Frederick Traill-Burroughs (m. 1870, d. 1905)

Eliza D'Oyly Traill-Burroughs, Lady Burroughs (née Geddes, 9 May 1849 – 1 February 1908) was a British archaeologist from Scotland. She described the discovery of the rare Taversöe Tuick chambered cairn on the island of Rousay, Orkney, Scotland in May 1898 in her journal, which was published and discussed in Proceedings of the Society of Antiquaries of Scotland in 1985.

== Biography ==
She was born in 1849 in Leamington Priors, Warwickshire, England, and grew up in the Meadows in Edinburgh, Scotland.

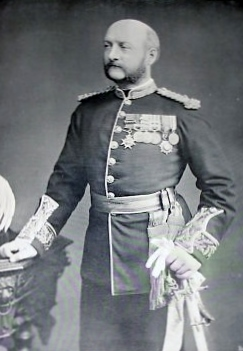
Frederick Traill-Burroughs in 1897

Eliza was the youngest daughter of Colonel William Geddes of the Bengal Horse Artillery and his wife Emma. Aged 21, she married Lt-General Sir Frederick Traill-Burroughs (1831–1905) on 4 June 1870. He had inherited an estate on Rousay, Orkney, to which the couple moved after their marriage. Lady Burroughs was a painter, and trained their butler at Rousay, John Logie, to paint.

Lady Burroughs' interest in art, politics, and charity meant that she was strongly involved in life on Orkney. Lady Burroughs was President of the Orkney branch of the Scotch Girls Friendly Society. She also wrote about the conditions on Rousay, saying that the biting wind was "apt to catch one in the ears as one looks at the view in front."

== Discovery of Taversöe Tuick ==
In 1893, work began building Lady Burroughs' and her husband's home, Trumland House, which is where the Taversoe Tuick Chambered Cairn was discovered in 1898.

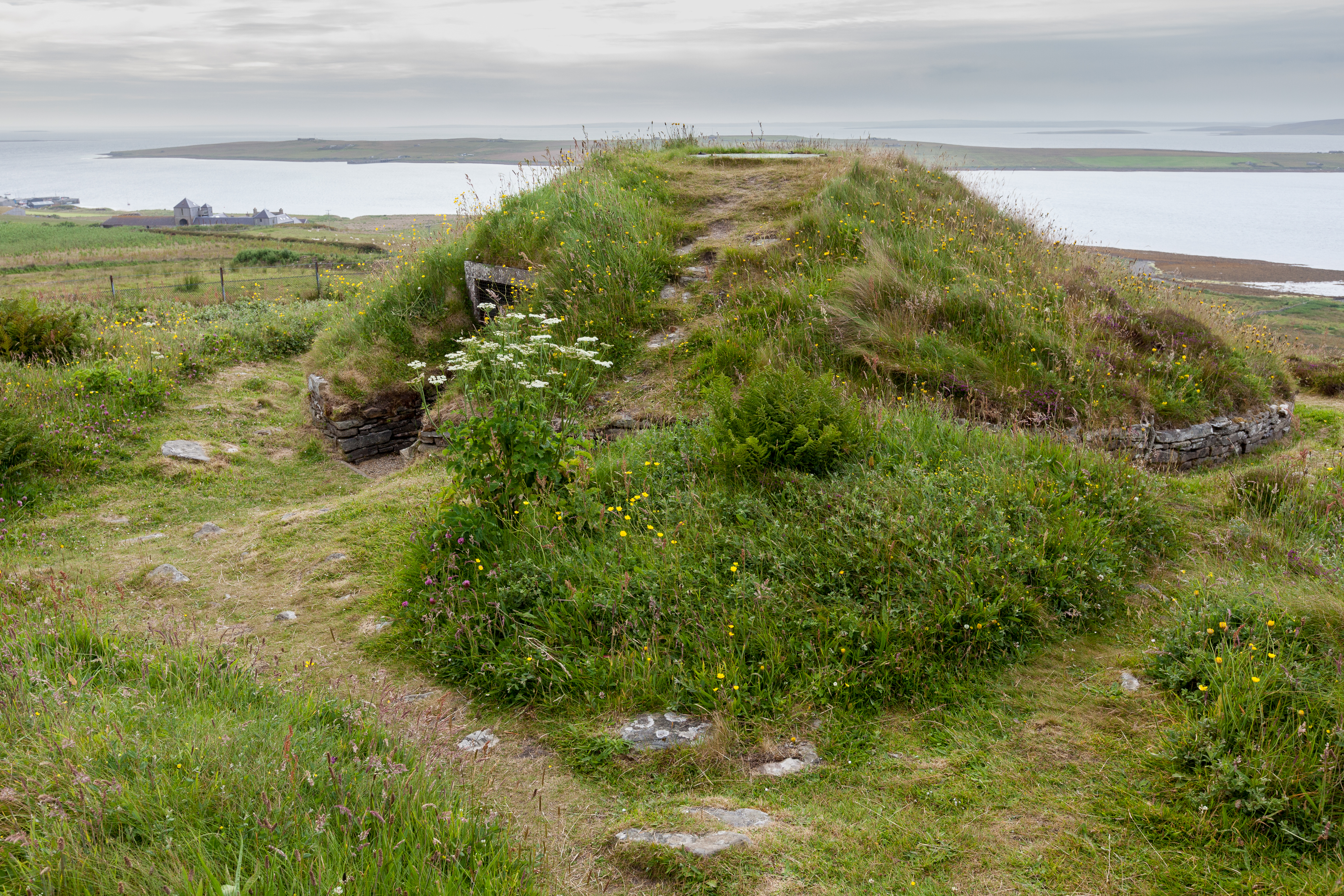
The Taversöe Tuick Chambered Cairn which Lady Burroughs excavated and described

Lady Burroughs wrote a report on Taversoe Tuick, which provides a detailed chronological overview of the events leading up to the discovery and the excavation of the cairn, accompanied by sketches, plans, and measurements. She signed off her report with 'Veronica' and not with her own name. In her later life, Lady Burroughs described the excavation as '...one of the most interesting events of my life: a pursuit I can cordially recommend to anyone in search of excitement!' The findings of the excavation were published in 1903 by Sir William Turner, but Eliza was only credited for her illustrations.

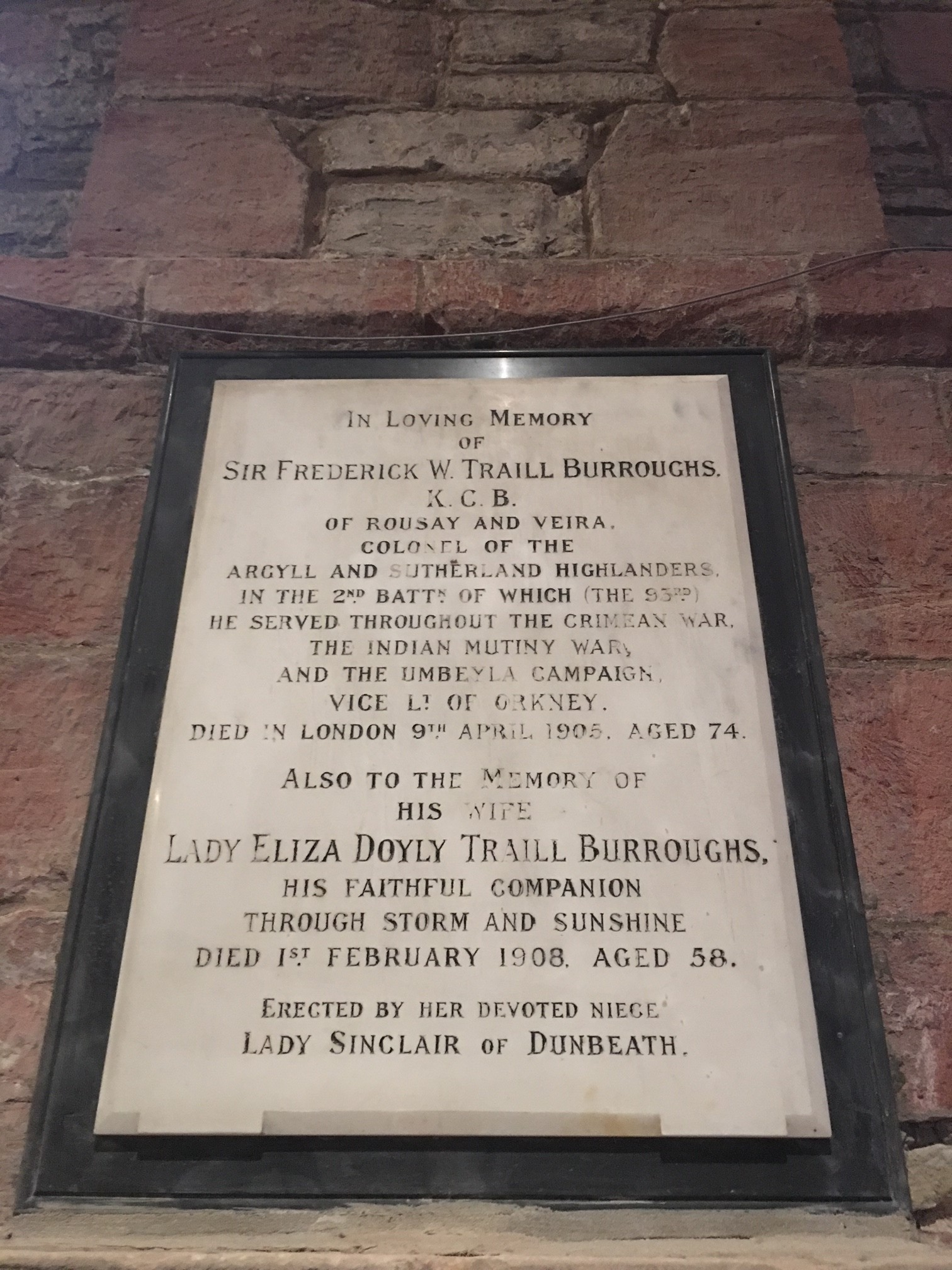
Memorial stone in Kirkwall Cathedral

Lady Burroughs' Taversoe Tuick report was transcribed and published in 1987 by Diana Reynolds. Eliza was commended for her standard of recording and contribution to archaeological research in Scotland, as her archaeological views continue to help archaeologists understand the site's chronology.

== Death and memorials ==
Lady Burroughs was widowed in 1905 and died in 1908 in London, England, aged 57. She is buried in London, England.

There is a memorial stone in St Magnus Cathedral, Kirkwall, with the words: "Erected in loving memory of Sir Frederick W. Traill-Burroughs ... Also to the memory of his wife Lady Eliza Doyly Traill Burroughs, his faithful companion through storm and sunshine ... Erected by her devoted niece Lady Sinclair of Dunbeath".

Students at North East Scotland College created a short film about Lady Burroughs' life. The film was featured at the Orkney Storytelling Festival in October 2022.
