= Eynhallow =

Island in Orkney, Scotland

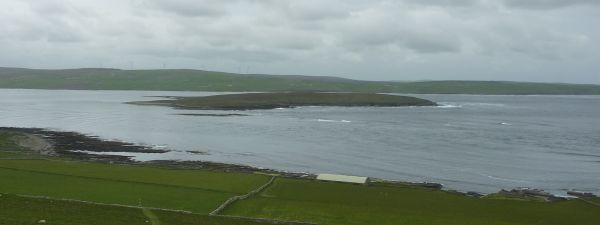
- Eynhallow viewed from Rousay, from the north-east, with the Orkney Mainland beyond

Location
- Eynhallow shown within Orkney
- OS grid reference: HY359291
- Coordinates: 59.14°N 3.11°W

Name
- Name meaning: Holy island
- Old Norse name: Eyinhelga

Physical geography
- Island group: Orkney
- Area: 75 hectares (0.29 sq mi)
- Area rank: 168
- Highest elevation: 30 metres (98 ft)

Administration
- Council area: Orkney Islands
- Country: Scotland
- Sovereign state: United Kingdom

Demographics
- Population: 0

Eynhallow is a small, presently uninhabited island in Eynhallow Sound, between Rousay and the Mainland of Orkney, off the north coast of mainland Scotland. It is 75 hectares (0.29 square miles) in area. There is an unnamed skerry about 100 metres (330 feet) to the north-east of the island, separated by Fint Sound. Sheep Skerry adjoins the southern end of the island.

There is no ferry to the island, although Orkney Heritage Society organises a trip each July. Otherwise, visitors have to arrange their own transport to the island by private local boat hire. Access can be problematic, as there are strong tidal surges in the surrounding strait, funnelled between Mainland and Rousay.

== Etymology ==
The Norse named the island Eyinhelga, meaning "holy island". Johan Blaeu's 17th century Atlas Novus records the name as Alhallow. Skene's 19th century translation of John of Fordun's 14th century Chronica Gentis Scotorum records the name as Enhallow.

== History ==
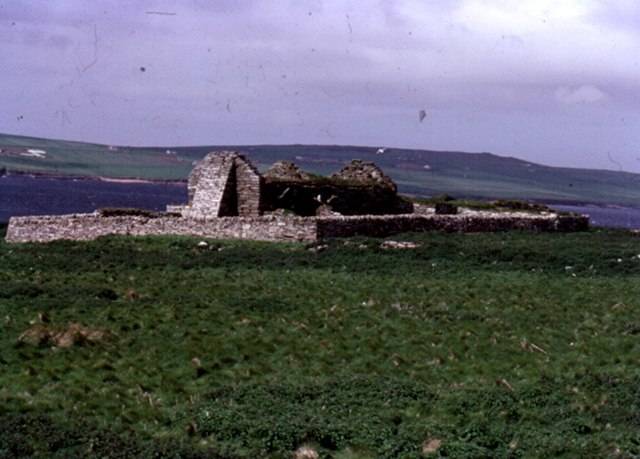
The ruined chapel on Eynhallow

The island's main attraction is Eynhallow Church, dating from the 12th century or earlier, and perhaps originally part of a monastery. The site is maintained by Historic Scotland.

In 1841 the island had a population of 26. It has been uninhabited since the landowner cleared crofters away in 1851. The clearing led to the discovery of the church ruins, forgotten until then. The island is now a bird sanctuary.

Described as "perhaps the most mystical of the Orkney isles", it has its own folklore concerning the initial finding of the island. Eynhallow was believed to be the summer residence of the shape-shifting mer-people the Finfolk before they were driven away by a farmer from Evie, the Guidman o' Thorodale.

== Cinderella stamps ==
Cinderella stamp issues have been made for Eynhallow since at least 1973. They have no postal currency.

== See also ==
- Gurness
