= Marable Couper =

Scottish accused witch

- Era: 17th-century Birsay, in Orkney.
- Known for: Scottish woman executed in Orkney for witchcraft in 17th century.

Marable Couper (Marybel Cooper) was a young woman who lived in Birsay and was tried and executed for the crime of witchcraft in 1624.

== Background ==
Couper lived in the settlement of Northside in Birsay with her husband John Spence and their son Robbie.

She was known locally as someone consulted for charms and potions to treat illnesses. This resulted in accusations of witchcraft which led to Couper's banishment from her parish, which she refused to comply with.

She was involved in a quarrel with her neighbours, David Mowat and Margaret Corftoun, who had some misfortune with their cattle for which they blamed Couper, accusing her of putting a curse on them.

== Trial ==
Couper was brought from Birsay to St Magnus Cathedral in Kirkwall and held in Marwick's Hole until her trial, which took place on 7th July 1624. The prosecutor of her case was Robert Chalmer and the judge was John Buchanan.

She was found guilty of the crime of witchcraft and was sentenced to death by public strangulation and burning at Gallow Ha in 1624.
