= Blackhammer Chambered Cairn =

Neolithic burial monument in Orkney, Scotland

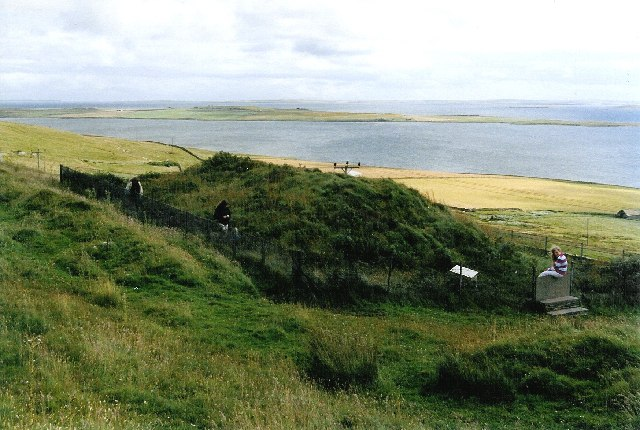
- The tomb in 2005
- Interactive map of Blackhammer Chambered Cairn
- 59°07′53″N 3°01′31″W
- Type: Tomb
- Location: Scotland

History
- Built: c. 3000 BC

Site notes
- Material: Stone
- Length: 22.5 m (74 ft)
- Width: 8.9 m (29 ft)

The Blackhammer Chambered Cairn is a Neolithic chambered cairn located on the island of Rousay, in Orkney, Scotland. The tomb, constructed around 3000 BC, is a Orkney–Cromarty chambered cairn, characterized by stalled burial compartments. Historic Environment Scotland established the site as a scheduled monument in 1994.

== Description ==
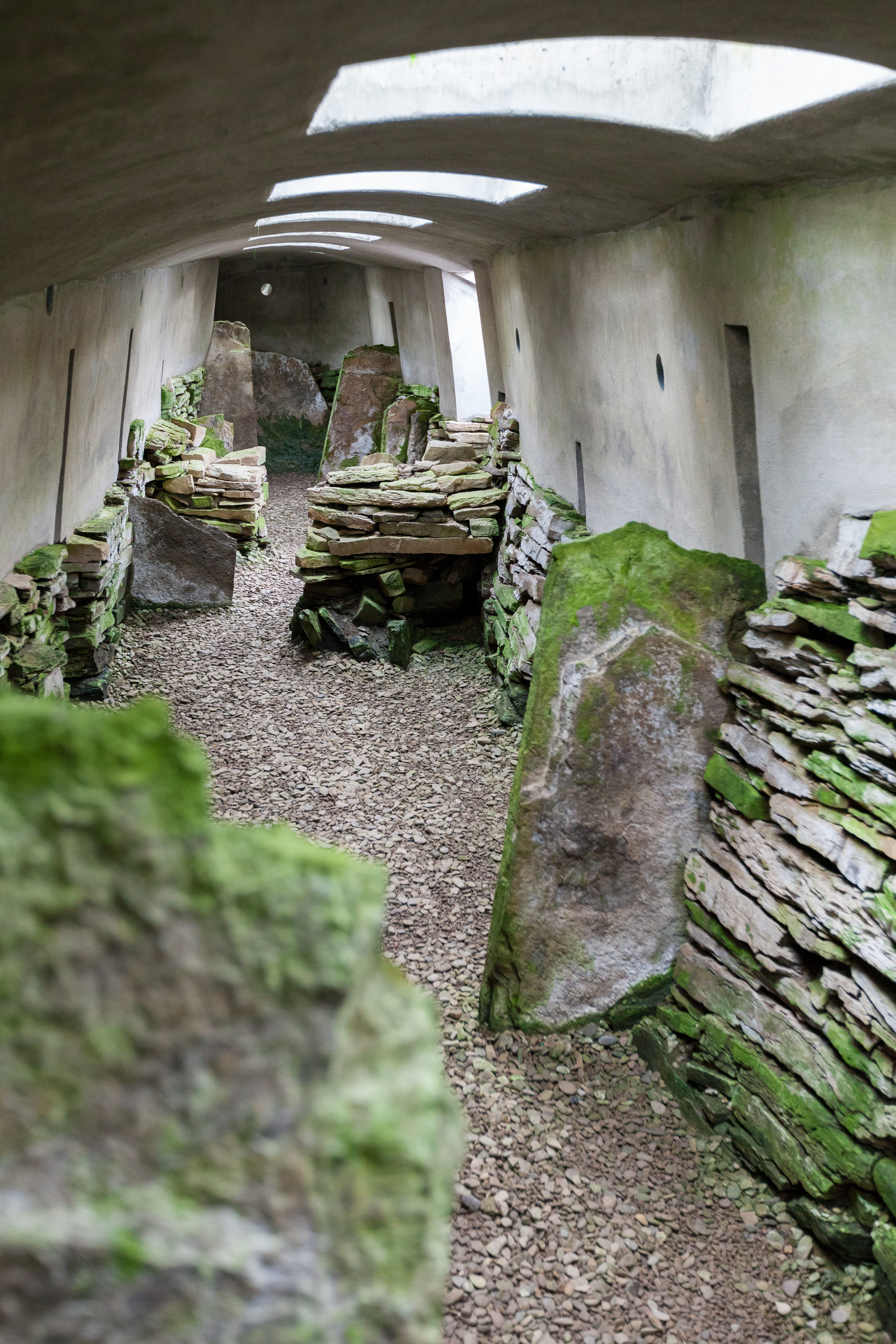
Interior

The monument is located near the base of a hillside on the island of Rousay, in Orkney, Scotland. The site looks out over Eynhallow Sound. Dating to around 3000 BC, the tomb belongs to a group of burial monuments known as Orkney–Cromarty chambered cairns, characterized by burial compartments that are separated by upright stone slabs. Above the tomb, near the top of the hill, and built during the same time period, is the Knowe of Yarso chambered cairn.

The oblong tomb measures 22.5 m (74 ft) by 8.9 m (29 ft) externally. The cairn encloses a long burial chamber measuring 13.5 m (44 ft) by 2 m (6 ft 7 in), and 2 m (6 ft 7 in) in height. The burial monument was first excavated in 1936. It was determined to have originally been constructed with seven compartments divided by pairs of standing slabs. Four of the original slabs had been removed at the time of excavation. Currently, the tomb is entered through a modern, concrete roof. Skeletal remains of two adult males were uncovered during excavation, along with a pottery bowl, a flint knife, a polished stone axe and animal bones. On the exterior of the tomb, on either side of the entrance, is decorative masonry set in a triangular design, a characteristic trait of Neolithic tombs on the island of Rousay.

== See also ==
- Prehistoric Orkney
- Timeline of prehistoric Scotland
