= Little general =

Little General may refer to:

- Dick Advocaat (born 1947), Dutch football manager and former player
- Garnet Campbell (curler) (1927–2011), Canadian curler
- Avery Johnson (born 1965), American basketball player and coach
- Stacey Jones (born 1976), New Zealand rugby league footballer
- Ron Lancaster (1938–2008), an American-Canadian football player and coach
- Allan Langer (born 1966), Australian rugby league footballer
- Óscar Pareja (born 1968), a Colombian professional football manager
- Aimé Picquet du Boisguy (1776–1839), a French chouan general during the French Revolution
- Lars-Erik Sjöberg (1944–1987), a Swedish ice hockey player
- Frederick Traill-Burroughs (1831–1905), a British Army officer
- Andre Turner (born 1964), an American basketball player

== See also ==
- Eddie LeBaron (1930–2015), American quarterback known by the nickname "Littlest General"
