= Knowe of Yarso chambered cairn =

Neolithic chambered cairn located on the island of Rousay in Orkney, Scotland

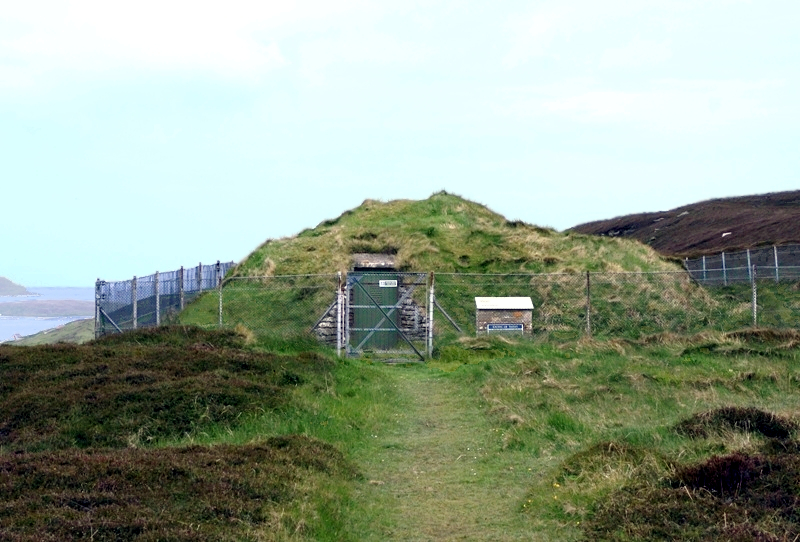
- The mound in 2011
- Interactive map of Knowe of Yarso chambered cairn
- 59°08′03″N 3°02′30″W
- Type: Tomb
- Location: Scotland

History
- Built: c. 3000 BC

Site notes
- Material: Stone
- Height: 2 m (6 ft 7 in)
- Length: 15 m (49 ft)

Knowe of Yarso chambered cairn is a Neolithic burial monument located on the island of Rousay in Orkney, Scotland. The site was excavated in the 1930s, and uncovered human and animal bones as well as pottery sherds, flint and bone tools, and arrowheads. The tomb, dating to the period between 3500 and 2500 BC, is a stalled chambered cairn, similar to Midhowe and Blackhammer. Historic Environment Scotland established the site as a scheduled monument in 1994.

== Description ==
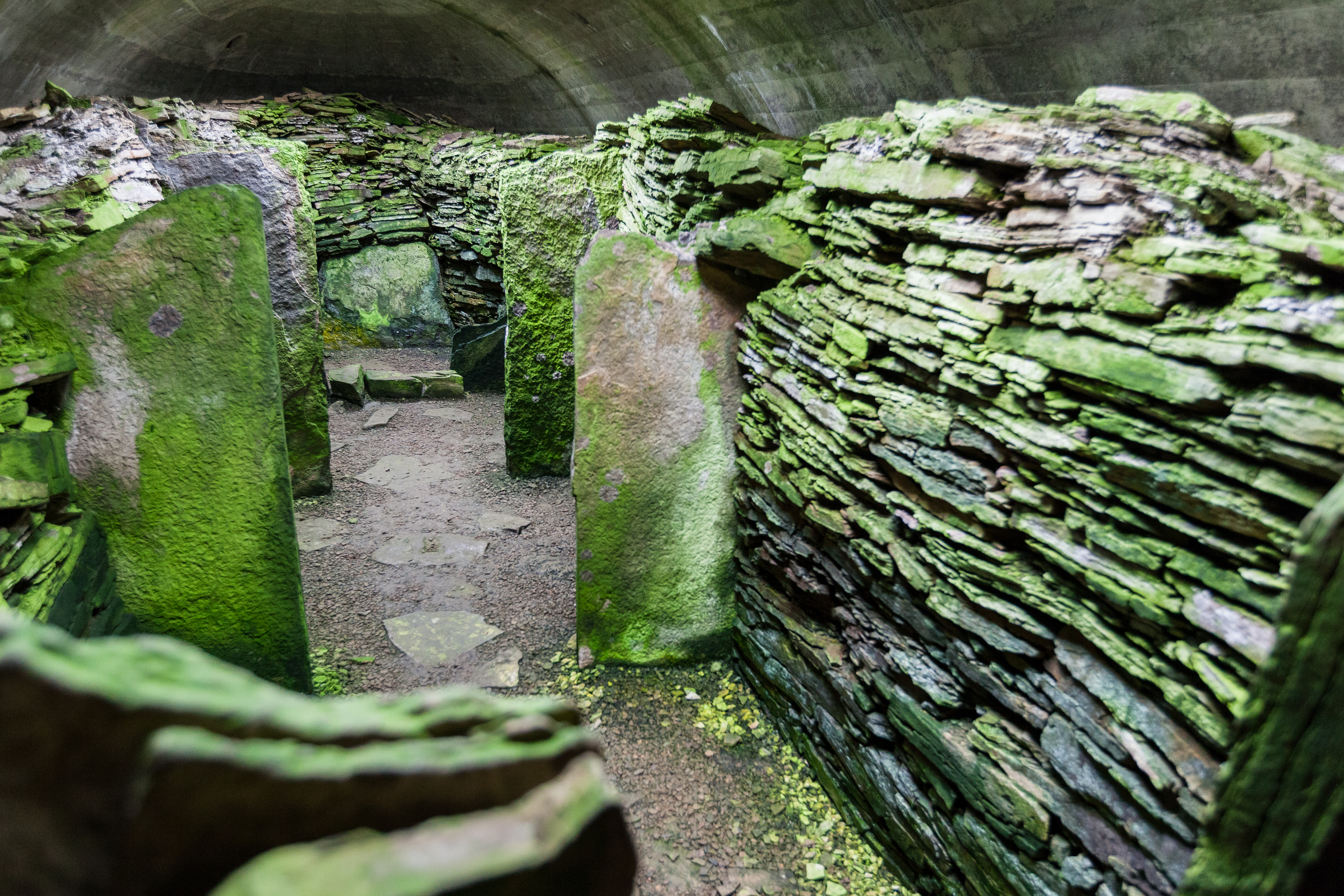
Interior, Knowe of Yarso

The Neolithic burial monument can be found on the island of Rousay in Orkney, Scotland. It sits on a ledge near the top of a steep hill, overlooking Eynhallow Sound. Near the base of the hill, are the remains of Blackhammer chambered cairn. Knowe of Yarso has been dated to the years between 3500 and 2500 BC. The burial monument can be seen as a large grass-covered mound with a concrete roof. The tomb is a type of Orkney–Cromarty stalled chambered cairn, similar to Midhowe and Blackhammer, also located on Rousay.

Archaeological excavation during the 1930s revealed a rectangular-shaped cairn measuring 15 m (49 ft) by 8 m (26 ft) externally and situated northwest–southeast. The cairn encloses a burial monument measuring 8 m (26 ft) by 2 m (6 ft 7 in) with a surviving height of 2 m (6 ft 7 in). The roof to the tomb had been removed at some point when the tomb was robbed. The exterior walls of the tomb display decorative stonework which can be seen near the entrance. The original burial chamber contained four compartments separated by pairs of upright slabs. Entrance to the main chamber is through a 4 m (13 ft) passage on the southeast. Excavation uncovered the skeletal remains of at least 29 people, 36 deer, several sheep and a dog. Also found were pottery sherds, four arrowheads, five bone tools and several pieces of flint. Historic Environment Scotland established the site as a scheduled monument in 1994.

== See also ==
- Vinquoy chambered cairn
- Cuween Hill Chambered Cairn
- Timeline of prehistoric Scotland
