= Rendall =

Parish on Mainland, Orkney, Scotland

Coordinates: 59°4′6″N 3°3′35″W

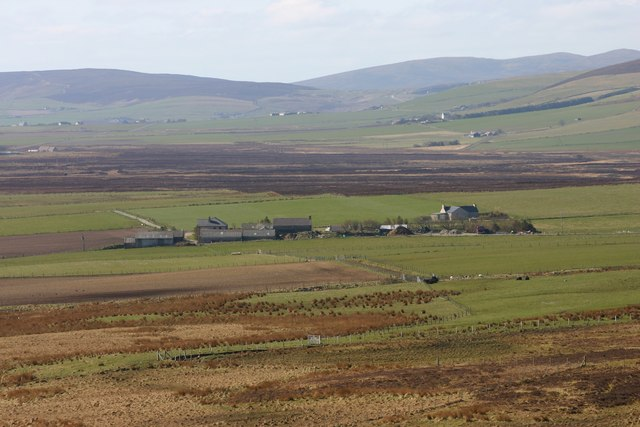
Ellibister and surrounding farm land viewed from foot of Hammars Hill looking towards Redland and Firth.

Rendall (Old Norse: Rennudalr or Rennadal) is a parish on Mainland, Orkney, Scotland. It is in the north west of the island and lies east of the parishes of Birsay and Evie and north east of Harray. The island of Gairsay is also in the parish.

== Important Sites and Attractions ==
The Rendall Doocot is a 17th-century beehive doocot located at the Hall of Rendall and is unique in the Northern Isles, as most doocots are square/rectangle buildings. The Hall of Rendall is a settlement mound containing prehistoric structures, possibly a broch but that is doubted, and the remains of a medieval church. Human remains are regularly recovered from the beach and eroding sections near the church.

The Tingwall Ferry Terminal is located in Rendall and operates ferries to Rousay, Egilsay and Wyre. Next to it is a broch and a Thing, both scheduled monuments. Tingwall is from the Old Norse place-name 'Thing-völlr', meaning 'thing-field' and the first mention of it occurs in the 12th-century Orkneyinga Saga.

Seven Knowes, a scheduled monument, is also located in Rendall. The monument comprises the remains of seven barrows dating from the Bronze Age. The monument was first scheduled in 1936.

== Archaeology ==
In 2003, a farmer undertook work to flatten a small knoll they thought was a stone dump but shortly after the works started it became apparent that the knoll was instead a burial mound. GUARD Archaeology was called in to excavate the site as part of the Historic Scotland Human Remains Call Off Contract (now Historic Environment Scotland). The results of this excavation found two cists containing cremations and a third cist that contained a burial. The burials that could be dated were found have been buried some time between 2020 and 1760 BC.

Excavations of three of the barrows at Seven Knowes in 1998 found two had centrally placed cremation cists.

== Images ==
Rendall Old Cemetery

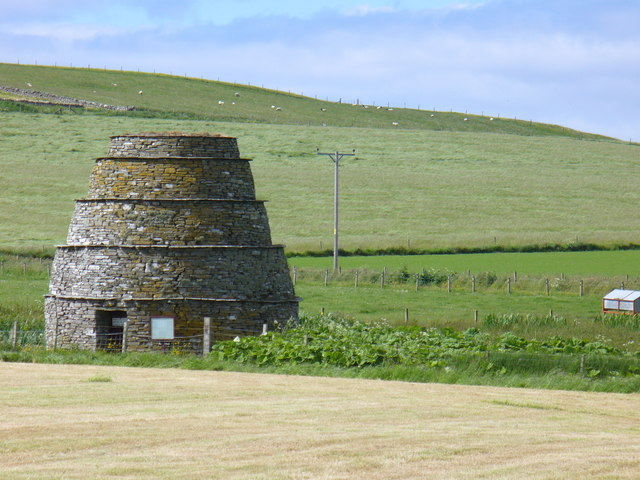
Rendall Doocot

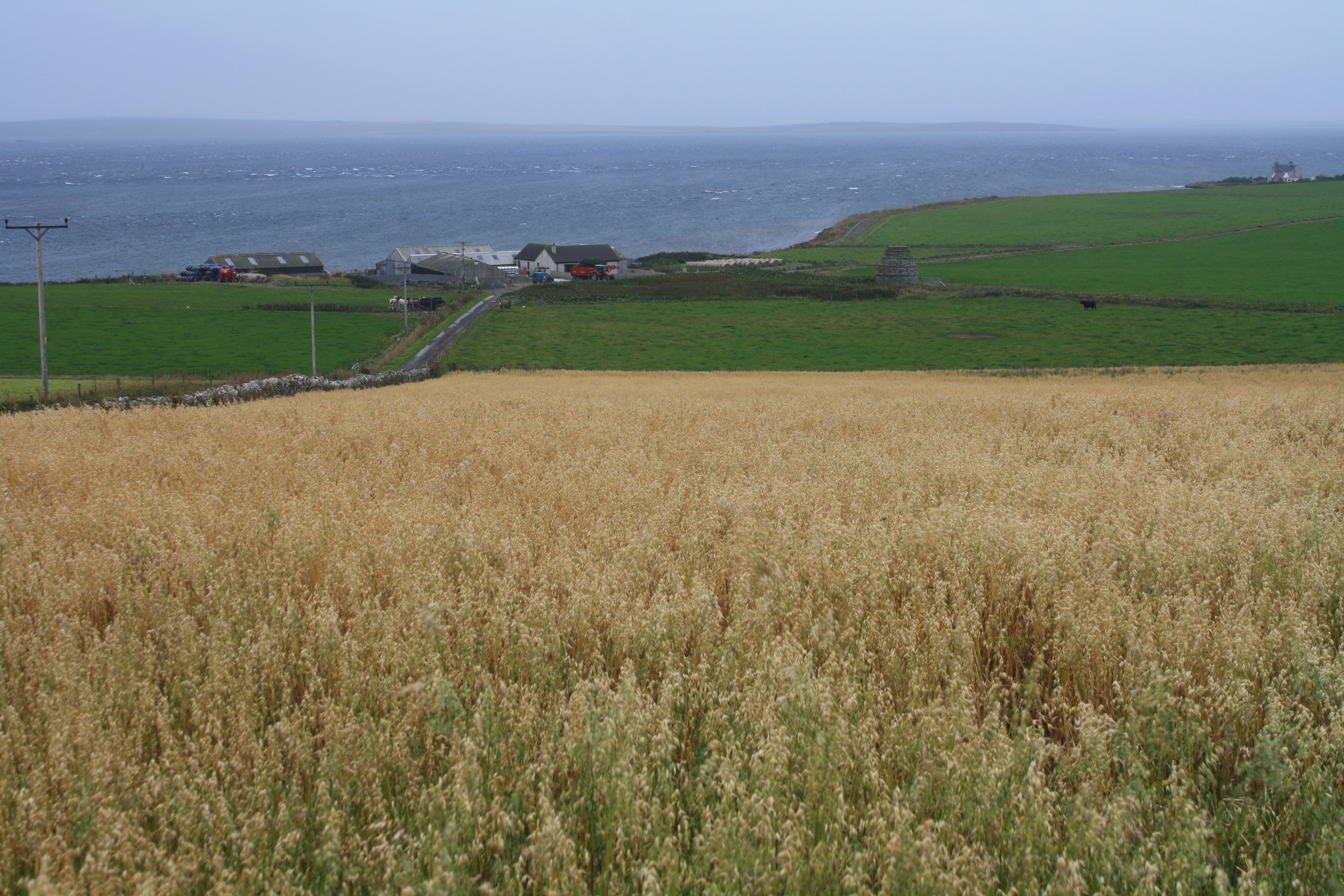
Hall of Rendall

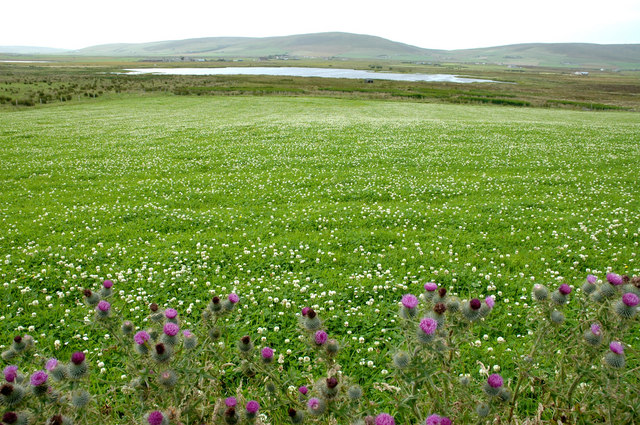
Lock Brocken
