= Wheebin standing stone =

Neolithic standing stone located on the mainland of Orkney, Scotland

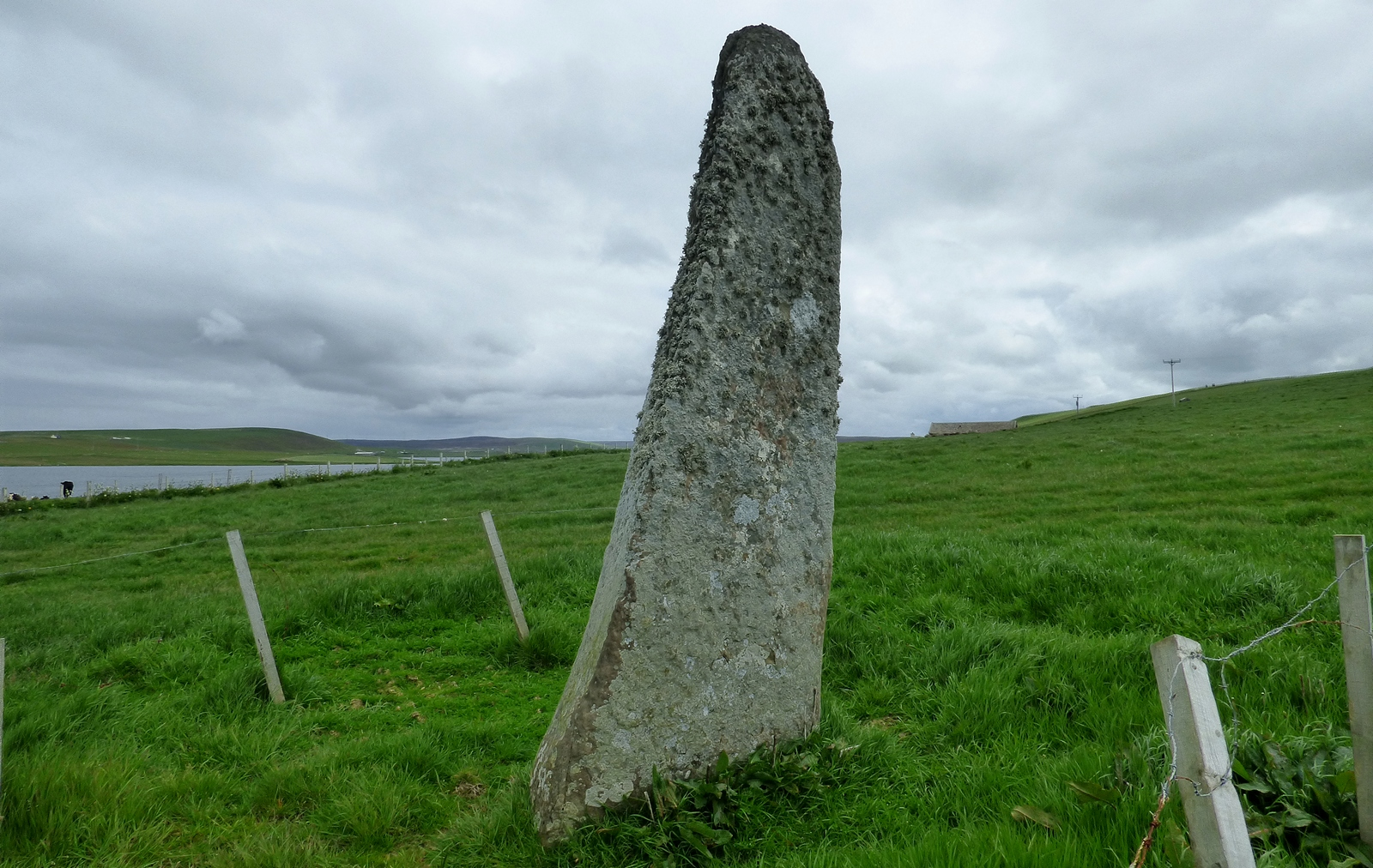
- Wheebin Standing Stone, Mainland, Orkney

- Location within Orkney Islands
- 59°07′01″N 3°18′22″W
- Type: Standing stone
- Periods: Late Neolithic to Early Iron Age
- Location: Mainland, Orkney, Scotland

History
- Built: 2nd millennium BC

Site notes
- Owner: Historic Scotland

The Wheebin Standing stone (or Stane O' Quoybune) is an ancient, tall standing stone located in the parish of Birsay, in the north west of the mainland of Orkney, Scotland. It was erected in the 2nd millennium BC. Historic Environment Scotland established the site as a scheduled monument in 1937.

== Location ==
The stone is located in the parish of Birsay, 1.5 km (0.93 mi) southeast of the village of Birsay, on the mainland of Orkney in Scotland. The monolith stands in a field on private property next to the road and is 274 m (899 ft) from the western edge of the Loch of Boardhouse.

== Description ==
The stone is 3.5 m (11 ft) in height, approximately 1.5 m (4 ft 11 in) wide and narrows gradually to the top, with an average thickness of 0.4 m (1 ft 4 in). The Wheebin stone slopes up slightly towards the north-northwest. It shows signs of severe weathering, with one deep crevice displayed from the middle of the stone to the top. The constant rubbing of domestic animals over the years have polished the surface of the lower half of the stone. The stone had originally been brought from nearby higher ground and placed with its major axis north-northwest and south-southeast.

The stone dates to the Late Neolithic or Early Bronze Age, around the 2nd millennium BC. Similar standing stones such were typically put up in the later Neolithic period (around 2000 BC). Historic Environment Scotland established the site as a scheduled monument in 1937.

== See also ==
- Prehistoric Orkney
- Callanish Stones
- Stone of Setter
