= Evie, Orkney =

Coordinates: 59.115°N 3.131°W

Evie
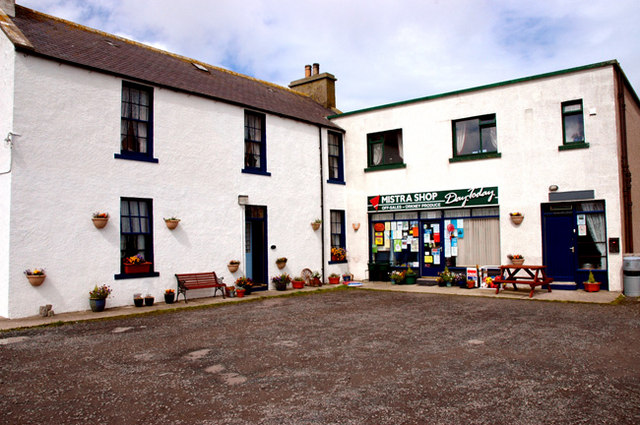
- Mistra Shop in Evie Village, the Mistra Club (a former pub) is upstairs

- Location within Orkney
- OS grid reference: HY352258
- Civil parish: Evie and Rendall
- Council area: Orkney
- Lieutenancy area: Orkney
- Country: Scotland
- Sovereign state: United Kingdom
- Post town: ORKNEY
- Postcode district: KW17
- Dialling code: 01856
- Police: Scotland
- Fire: Scottish
- Ambulance: Scottish
- UK Parliament: Orkney and Shetland
- Scottish Parliament: Orkney

Evie (pronounced /iːvi/) is a parish and village on Mainland, Orkney, Scotland. The parish is located in the north-west of the Mainland, between Birsay and Rendall, forming the coastline opposite the isle of Rousay.

== History ==
Within the parish are a number of prehistoric features, including Gurness, an Iron Age broch that overlooks Eynhallow Sound.

Adam Bothwell, Bishop of Orkney, granted a lease or feu of the lands of Evie to Patrick Bellenden in April 1565. In June 1589, Robert Stewart, Earl of Orkney, granted Evie to Lewis Bellenden.

== Economy ==
Evie is home to two large dairy farms called Dale and Georth as well as Burgar farm. There are also a few beef farms. This is due to the very good quality of soil contained in this area of Orkney. All three dairy farms contribute milk to the award-winning Orkney cheese as well as Orkney ice cream and other dairy products.

=== Burgar Hill Wind Farm ===
The five wind turbines on Burgar Hill in Evie are visible from a large part of the West Mainland. Established in 1983, Burgar Hill Wind Farm was one of the first wind farms in the UK.

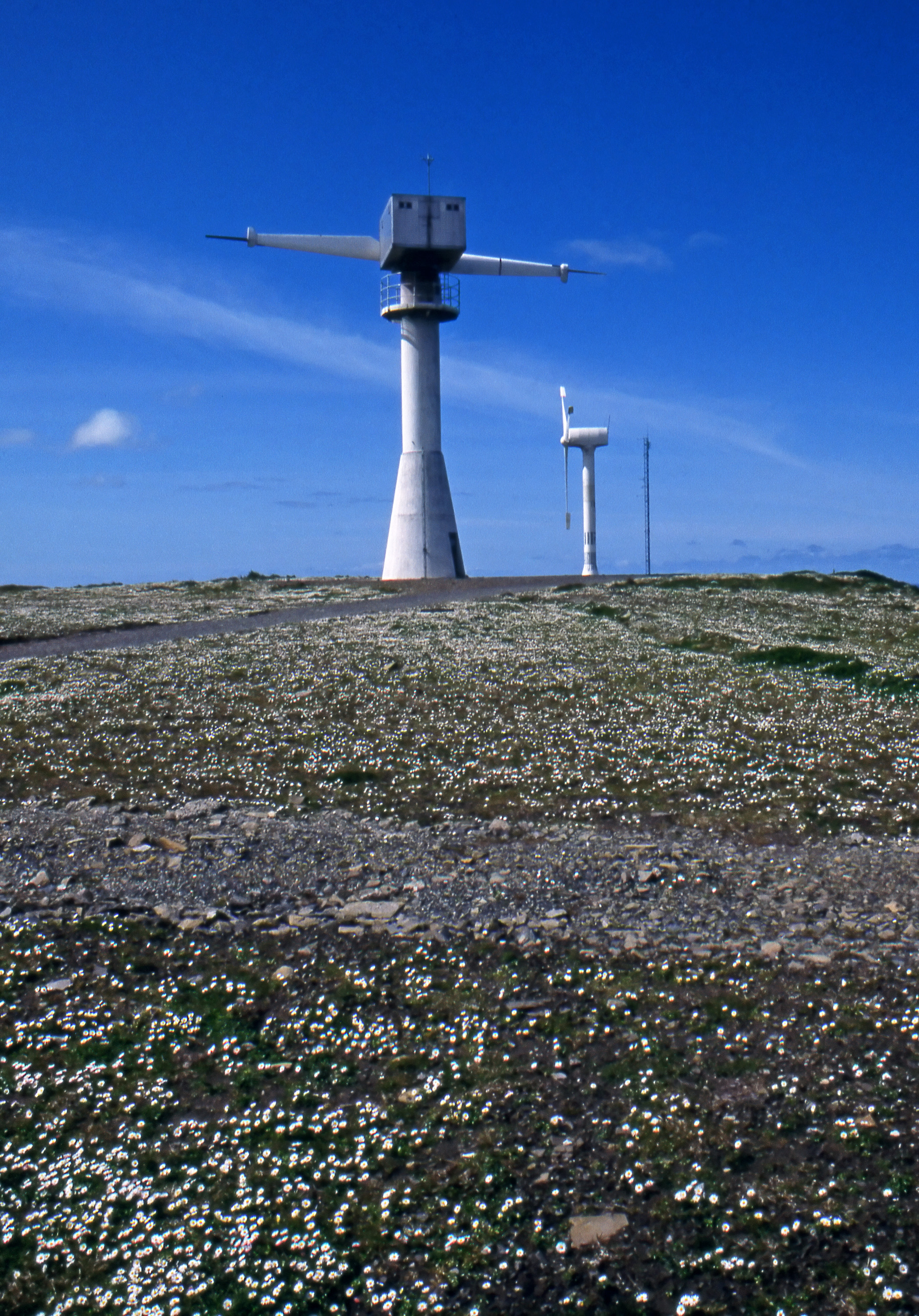
Burgar Hill Wind Farm, 1989

== People ==
Evie is the birthplace of the Orcadian writer Ernest Marwick.

Very Rev Dr A. J. Campbell DD, minister of Evie and Moderator of the General Assembly of the Church of Scotland 1945/46

== Folklore ==
In folklore, Evie was the home of the farmer, Guidman o' Thorodale who drove away the Finfolk, shape-shifting mer-people, from the island of Eynhallow.
