= Trumland =

Listed house and associated estate on Rousay, in Orkney, Scotland

Coordinates: 59°8′0″N 2°59′32″W

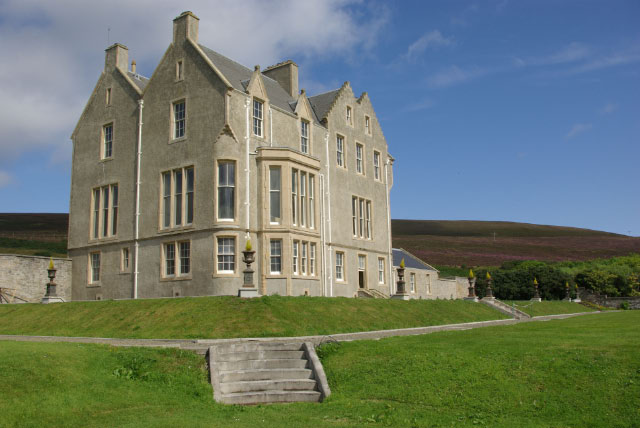
Trumland

Trumland is a Category B listed house and associated estate on Rousay, in Orkney, Scotland, built in its present form in the 1870s. Designed by David Bryce (1803–1876), the house was commissioned by Sir F W Traill-Burroughs (1831–1905) as a new family home after his marriage to Eliza D’Oyly Geddes (1849–1908) in 1870.

== Description ==
Overlooking the sound between Rousay and the island of Wyre, the house is built in the Scottish Jacobean style, with crow-stepped gables and canted windows, made from the local Rousay stone, with fine carved finials and architectural detailing. The house is three stories high with an attic, gable windows and dormers creating a fourth story. The house utilized the first and second stories as the principal living and sleeping quarters for the owners, the majority of the ground floor and attics were made over to management of the house and estate. The first owner's initials, F.W.T.B, and his wife's initial's E.D.G and the date 1873 are carved on a panel above the front door.

== History ==
Trumland was built to replace Westness House for General Sir Frederick W. Trail-Burroughs (1831-1905), who inherited Rousay and Wyre from his grand-uncle George W. Traill. Westness House, circa 1850, was the home of the Traill family on Rousay until 1863. Traill-Burroughs hired architect, David Bryce, in 1870 to build a new, larger family home after Traill-Burrough's marriage to Eliza D’Oyly Geddes on 4 June 1870. Traill-Burroughs and his wife chose a sheltered location for the site of the new house in a small valley through which a burn (stream) flows down to the sea. The new house was constructed between 1872 and 1873. Building costs were originally estimated to be £3,000, but the overall costs expanded to nearly £12,000 by the end of the project.

Traill-Burroughs unsuccessfully tried to sell the Rousay estate, including both Westness House and Trumland House – beginning in 1889. He died in 1905. Trumland passed from the Traill-Burroughs family in the 1920s, and was later purchased by the Grant family of Grant's whisky, and was used as the summer residence for Mr Walter Grant, who also owned Highland Park whisky in Kirkwall, Orkney. Trumland was later sold again, and passed through a series of owners until a fire on 4 April 1985 caused the house considerable damage, leaving the property roofless and with the upper floors and principal rooms seriously damaged or destroyed. After re-roofing in 1985 the house was again sold, and passed un-restored through a series of owners until purchased by the present owners in 2002, who are restoring the house and gardens to its previous form.
