= Point of Hellia =

Coordinates: 59.1234°N 3.0849°W

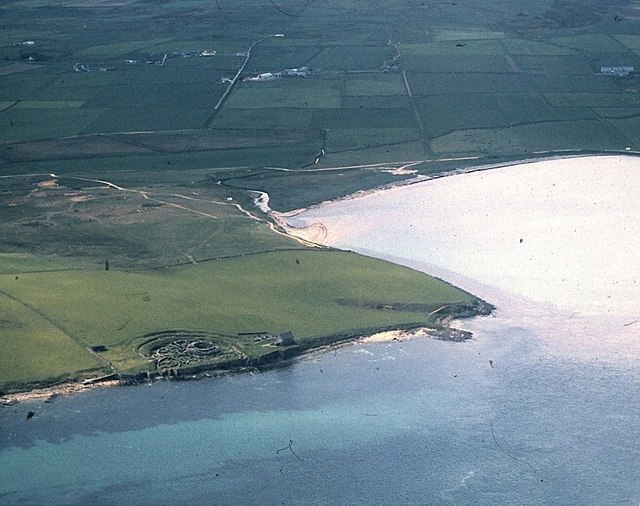
Point of Hellia.

The Point of Hellia is a headland on the northwest coast of the Orkney Mainland, Scotland. This landform extends into the southern part of Eynhallow Sound, a seaway of the North Sea.

Gurness, an Iron Age broch promontory fort, is situated on the Point of Hellia. According to Hogan, the drystone construction of the "round tower fort is flanked by a number of ancillary structures and impressive concentric ditch and rampart outer defences; moreover, the rocky shoreline cliffs posed a formidable approach for marine invaders."

== See also ==
- Evie, Orkney
- Sands of Evie
