= Birsay =

Parish on the Orkney mainland

Coordinates: 59°08.0′N 3°18.1′W

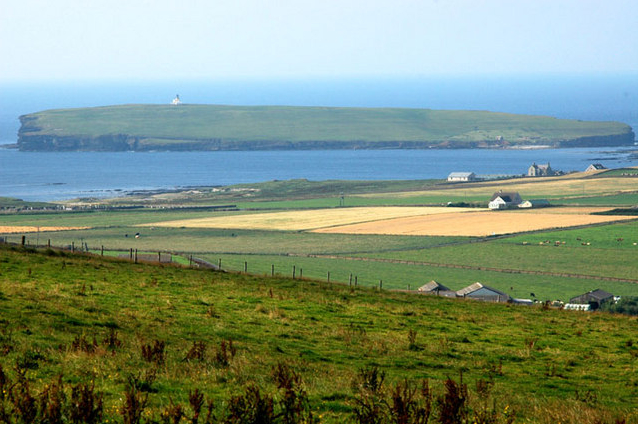
Birsay Parish, with the Brough of Birsay in the background

Birsay (/ˈbʌrsiː/) (Old Norse: Birgisherað) is a parish in the north west corner of The Mainland of Orkney, Scotland. Almost all the land in the parish is devoted to agriculture: chiefly grassland used to rear beef cattle. There are various ancient monuments in the parish.

== Ancient monuments ==
Two important ancient monuments are maintained by Historic Scotland and bring many visitors to the area in summer. These are the prehistoric and Norse settlements on the tidal island of Brough of Birsay and the ruins of the Earl's Palace on the Mainland opposite, at the northern end of the village.

On the western part of Mainland Orkney's north shore there is other evidence of prehistoric man, including the well preserved ruins of the Broch of Gurness.

== Earl's Palace ==
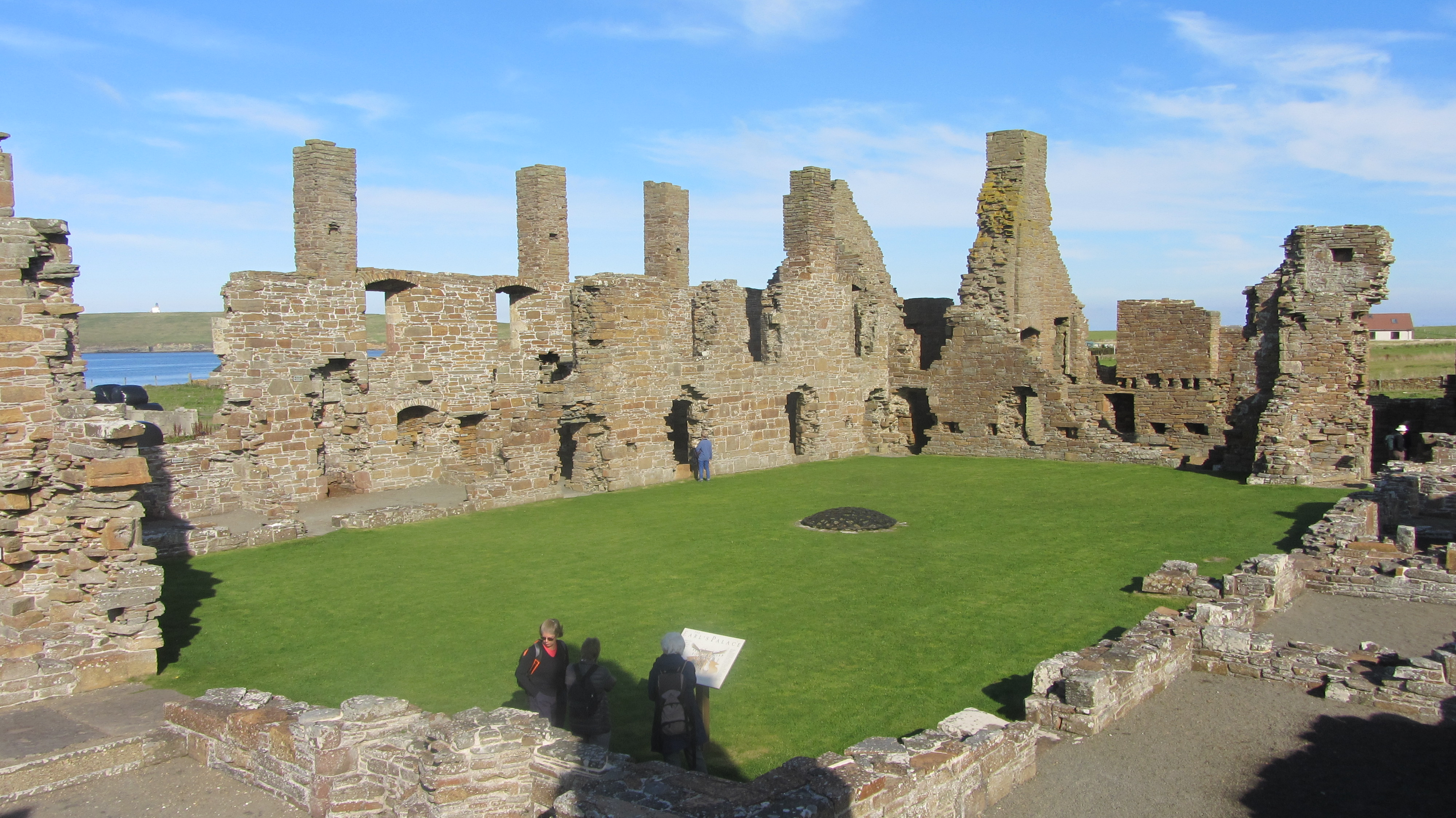
Earl's Palace, Birsay

The late 16th-century palace was built by Robert Stewart, 1st Earl of Orkney (1533–93). Though extensively ruined, it can be seen to have consisted of four ranges round an open courtyard, with small towers at the corners, an unusual form of building in Scotland at this date, and unprecedented in the north of the country. The date 1574 was formerly carved above the main (south-facing) entrance. The building has been uninhabited since the late 17th century. It was originally adjoined by walled garden enclosures, an archery range and a bowling green. This building, along with the Earl's Palace, Kirkwall and Scalloway Castle in Shetland (all Historic Scotland), were the main residences of the Stewart Earls of Orkney in the Northern Isles.

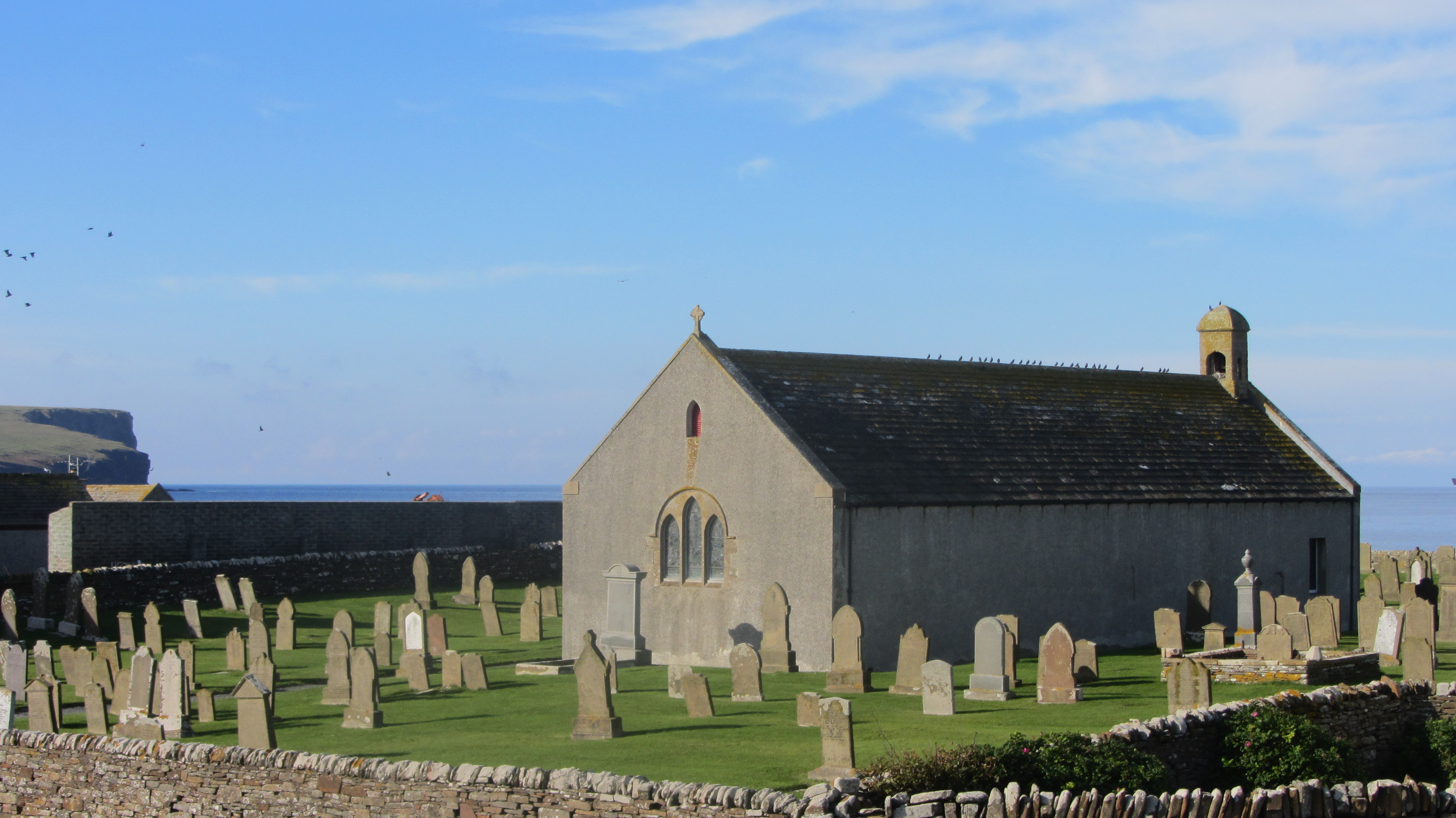
St Magnus Church, Birsay

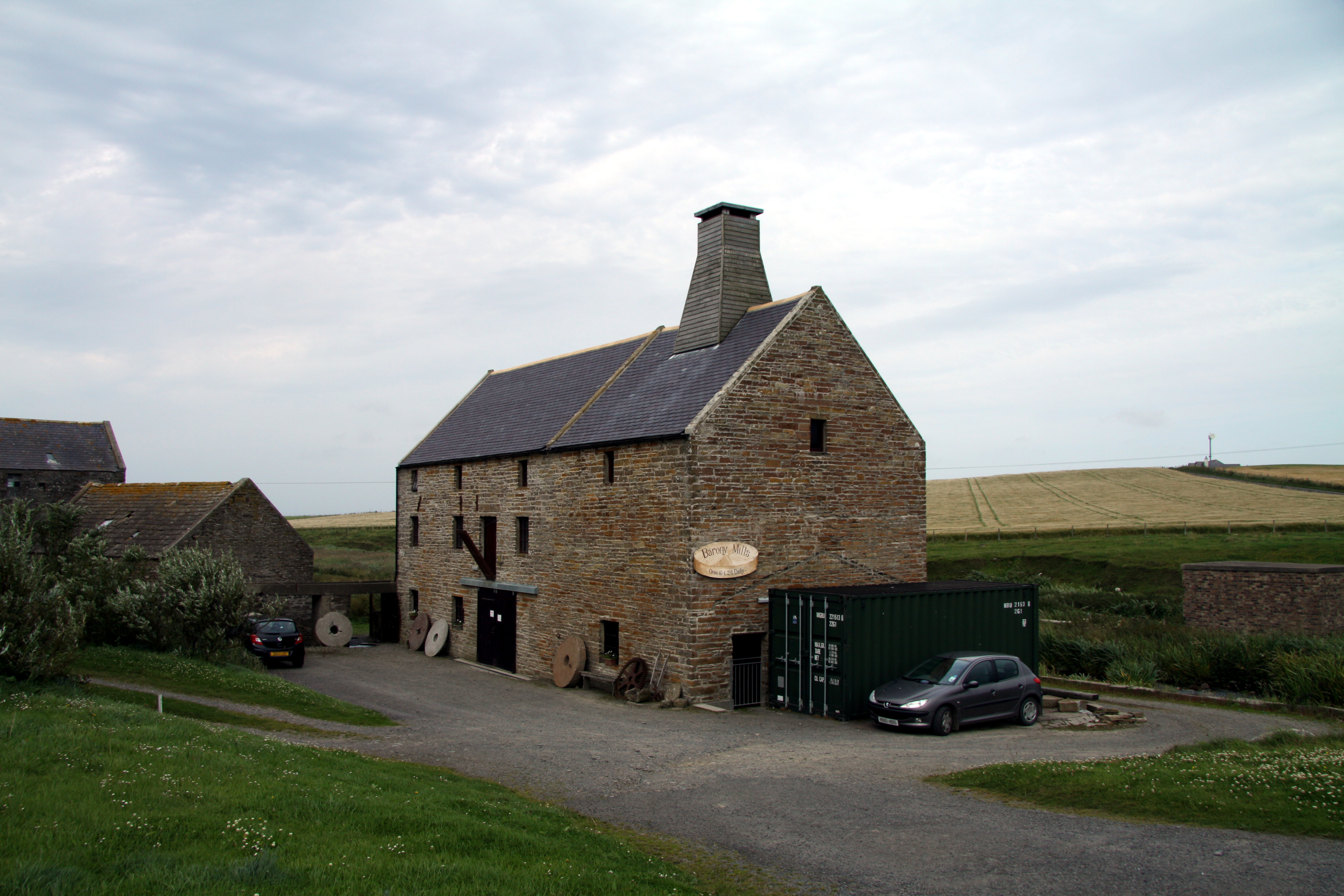
Mill near Birsay

== St Magnus Church ==
Near the palace is the St Magnus Church of the parish of Birsay and Harray (Church of Scotland; open in summer). Architectural fragments in the walls, and archaeological investigation of the foundations, suggest that this was the site of the first cathedral of Orkney in the 11th-12th centuries, known as Christchurch, founded by Earl Thorfinn the Mighty (d. c. 1065) after his return from a pilgrimage to Rome. The seat of the diocese was transferred to St Magnus Cathedral, Kirkwall, in the later 12th century, though the Bishops of Orkney continued to have a residence in Birsay (known by the Latin name Mons Bellus) into late medieval times.

The nearby bridge may also be medieval in origin.

== Notable people ==
- Samuel Trail was minister of the parish 1844 to 1868. He was Moderator of the General Assembly of the Church of Scotland in 1874.
- Harald Leslie, Lord Birsay

== See also ==
- Point of Hellia
- Wheebin standing stone
