= Frederick Traill-Burroughs =

British Army general

Lieutenant-General Sir Frederick Traill-Burroughs KCB CMG
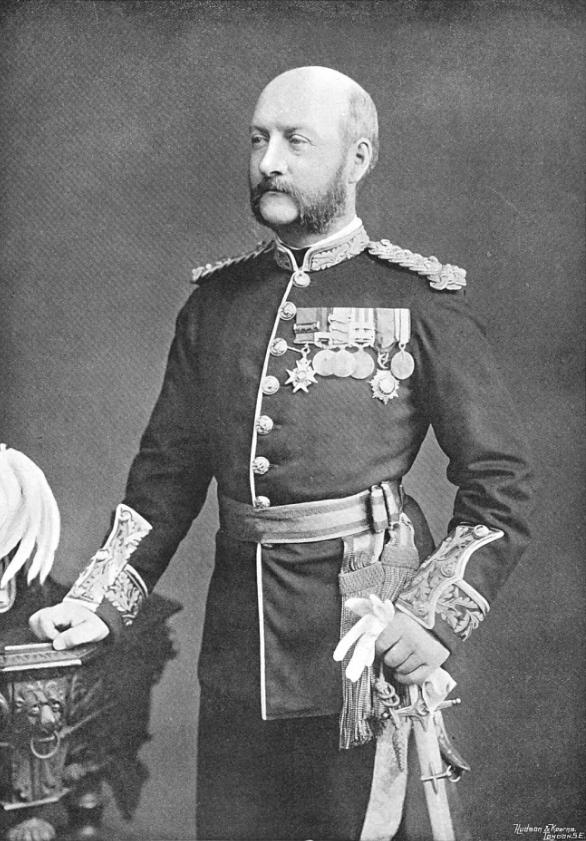
- Traill-Burroughs c.1898
- Born: Frederick William Burroughs; 1 February 1831; Fatehgarh, British India
- Died: 9 April 1905 (aged 74) London, England
- Spouse: Eliza D'Oyly Geddes

Sir Frederick William Traill-Burroughs KCB CMG (born Burroughs; 1 February 1831 – 9 April 1905) was a British Army officer.

He was born in British India, fought in Crimea at the Battle of Alma, at the siege town of Lucknow in India and in the North West Frontier. After a spell in command at Edinburgh Castle he retired from the army.

On his return from India, he visited Rousay, Orkney, where he built a large house at Trumland; he had inherited much of the island and gradually bought more of it, carrying out many improvements.

He died in London and is buried there in Brompton Cemetery.

== Early life ==
Traill-Burroughs was born at Fatehgarh (a military post) on the banks of the Ganges not far from Cawnpore in 1831, the eldest of five children to General Frederick William Burroughs and Caroline de Peyron.

His mother was the only daughter Capt. Charles Adolphus Marie de Peyron and Mary Colebrooke, eldest daughter of Sir George Colebrooke. His mother's grandfather was killed in a duel in Paris by Auguste Marie Raymond, Prince d'Arenberg, Comte de la Marck.

He was the grandson of Sir William Burroughs of Castle Bagshaw. His mother was of Capt. Charles Adolphus Marle de Peyron.

Several reputable sources, including the Dictionary of National Biography, describe him as the grandson of Sir William Burroughs, Advocate-General of Bengal. However, Traill-Burroughs was born 16 years after the death of Sir William's only son. Sir William Burroughs appears to have had several illegitimate children in India, including Harriet Caroline Gordon, Edward Williamson Gordon (provided for in Sir William Burroughs' will), and Frederick William Burroughs (Trail-Burroughs' father). As Sir William's only legitimate son died in battle in 1814, he was keen that Frederick William (Traill-Burroughs' father) took his name, and indeed, Frederick William spent a lot of energy 'proving' himself in battle in order to inherit the baronetcy, to no avail, as it died with Sir William. He is mentioned in the biography written by Sir William Burroughs' granddaughter, Louisa Mure, 'Recollections of By-Gone Days', this unknown relation (Frederick William) bearing a startling resemblance to the family, arrives in England at the death bed of another relation, saying he is the son of Sir William. Upon his 21st birthday, he adopted the Traill surname when he succeeded to the Orcadian estates left to him by his grand-uncle, George William Traill.

== Military career ==
Aged 17, he joined the 2nd Bn. 93rd (Sutherland Highlanders) Regiment of Foot, as an ensign.

He served throughout the Crimean War with his regiment, fighting at the Battle of Alma and the Battle of Balaclava where the 93rd were part of The Thin Red Line. Despite many casualties caused by fever, cholera and dysentery, as well as enemy action, his own health was usually good. The regiment was in the front line at Sebastopol when the war ended. They were preparing to assault the town - it is said with Burroughs leading the first wave of the Highland Brigade - but discovered next morning that the enemy had withdrawn during the previous night, so he missed his moment of potential glory.

Burroughs was also one of the first – if not the very first – through the breaches at the besieged town of Lucknow in the Indian Rebellion of 1857, for which he was recommended by the men of his regiment for a Victoria Cross, although due to internal military politics this was not awarded.

In 1864 he was promoted to lieutenant-colonel and commanded the regiment in bitter fighting on the North West Frontier, particularly during the Ambela campaign. He returned home with the regiment in 1870 and after a spell in command at Edinburgh Castle he eventually retired from the command of the 93rd Highlanders in October 1873, being replaced by Colonel William McBean VC. He was promoted to major general on 16 March 1880 and lieutenant-general on 1 July 1881.

From 1897 to 1904, he was colonel-in-chief of the Royal Warwickshire Fusiliers.

== Rousay ==
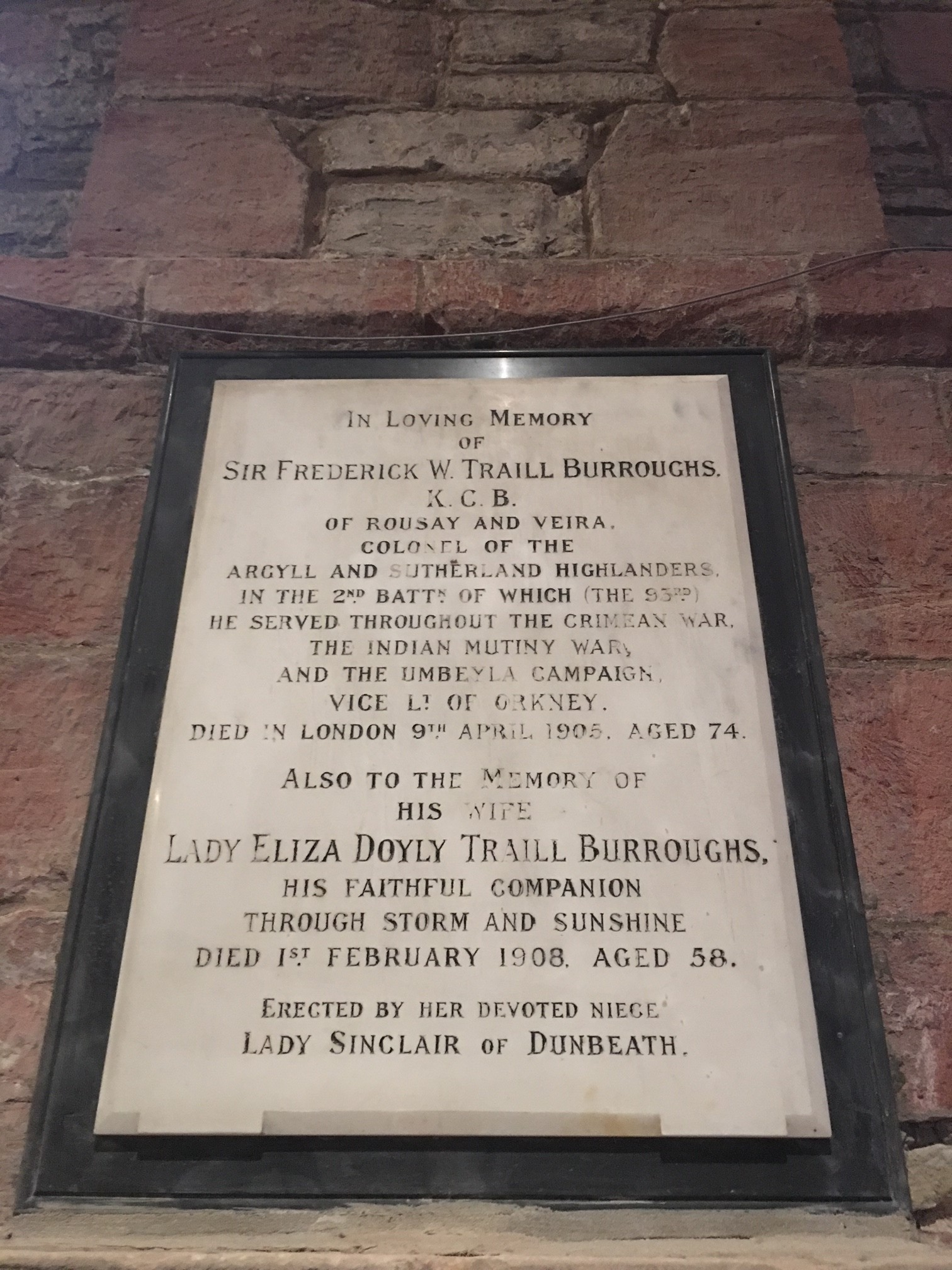
Frederick Trail-Burroughs memorial in Kirkwall Cathedral, Orkney

On his return from India, he and his wife, Eliza, visited Rousay, Orkney in July 1870. Traill-Burroughs had inherited much of the island and gradually bought more of it. He also built a large house at Trumland, designed by David Bryce of Edinburgh. From 1870 to 1883, there were a large number of improvements; the building of Trumland pier, island schools, a public market, the first steamship service, a post office, and the first resident doctor. He was known locally as 'the little general' as he was a man of short stature and the poet Edwin Muir recalled in a memoir of his childhood seeing the little general walking around his estates.

Throughout the 19th century, Rousay landlords demanded higher rents from crofters, many of whom were moved in a series of clearances to the far side of Rousay, ordered by previous landowner George William Traill. There is a misconception that Frederick Traill-Burroughs continued this attitude towards his tenants. For example, James Leonard was elected chairman of the tenants' committee, which gave evidence against General Burroughs to Lord Napier, as well as the Royal Commission, when they came to Rousay, in order to discuss tenants' concerns. After hearing James expressing his and other local tenants' views, General Burroughs evicted James and another local man, James Grieve, along with their families. Details of this and other incidents can be found in William P.L. Thomson's book The Little General and The Rousay Crofters (ISBN 9780859765312) However, the testimony of the Rev Archibald Mac Callum, page 699 of the 2nd Volume of the Napier Commission gives another view. When challenged about when the rents were too high his response was, "They agreed to pay their rents and must do so." When explained what if they cannot his response was, "Well they must just leave and go elsewhere, and I will get others To do it". Many witness statements are included in the Napier Enquiry and not just the witness statements of James Leonard and James Grieve. However, there is significant evidence that the two men who were evicted were not legal tenants of Traill and had both refused legal tenancies when offered, furthermore when the crofters were unable to make their own way to Mainland Orkney to give evidence at the Commission General Traill-Burroughs had them taken on his own boat to enable them to raise their grievances.

Burroughs was appointed a Vice-Lieutenant of Orkney and Shetland on 17 January 1900.

== Later life ==
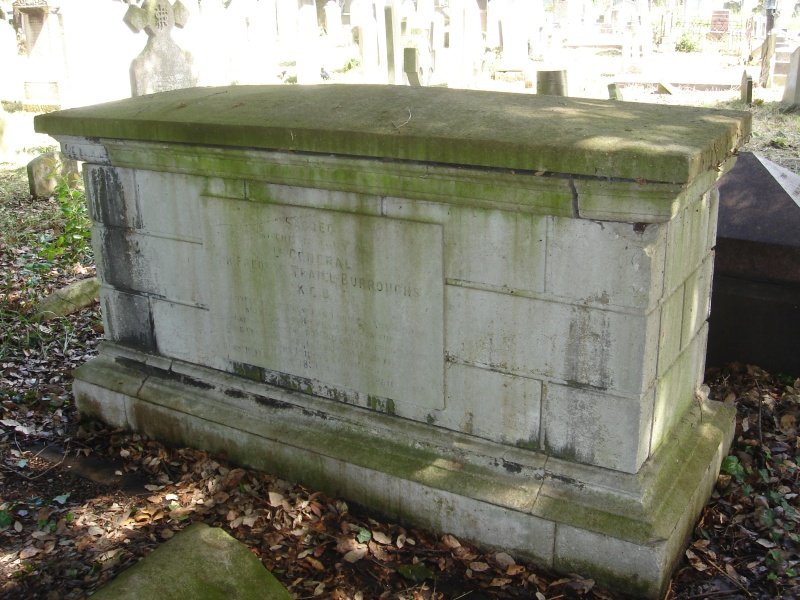
Funerary monument, Brompton Cemetery, London

Traill-Burroughs died in London on 9 April 1905, and is buried in Brompton Cemetery, London.

There is also a memorial to him in Kirkwall Cathedral.

== Personal life ==
He married Eliza D'Oyly Geddes (9 May 1849 – 1 February 1908), youngest daughter of Col. William Geddes and Emma D'Oyly. They had no children.

Military offices
Preceded by Robert Walter Macleod Fraser	Colonel of the Royal Warwickshire Regiment; 1897–1904	Succeeded by Sir Henry Broome Feilden
