= Taversöe Tuick =

Neolithic cairn in Orkney, Scotland

- Taversoe Tuick
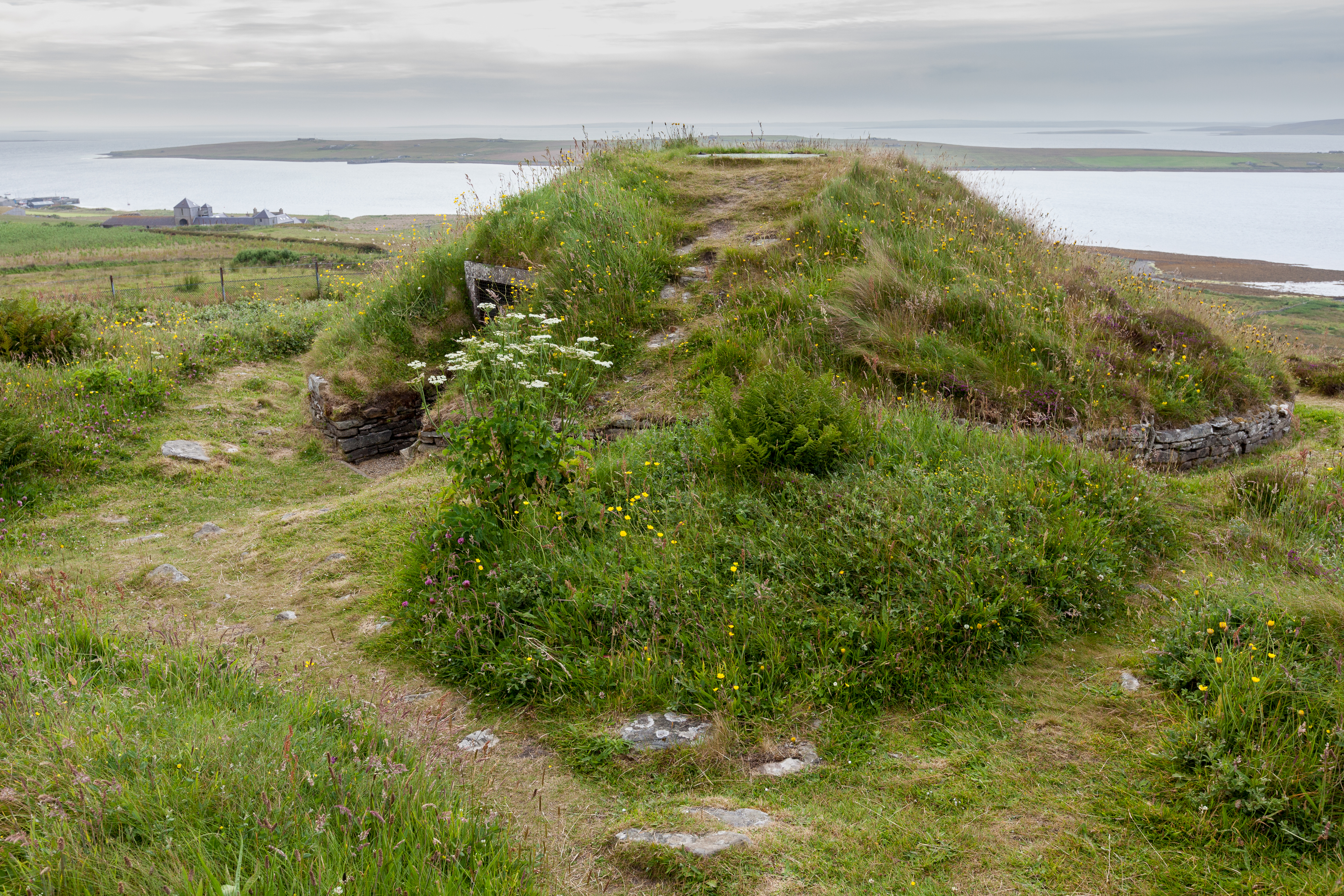
- The tomb in 2014

- Location in Rousay
- 59°07′53″N 3°00′18″W
- Type: Chambered cairn
- Periods: Neolithic
- Location: Scotland

History
- Built: c. 3250 BC

Taversöe Tuick (or Taversoe Tuick) is a Neolithic burial cairn on Rousay, Orkney, Scotland, thought to date from between 4000 and 2500 BCE. The monument includes a rare example of a double-tiered chamber, an upper chamber approached via a passageway and a lower subterranean chamber, originally separate, which can now be reached via a modern ladder from the upper chamber. It is unknown why the chambers were stacked in this way. The monument includes a third miniature chamber slightly downhill of the lower chamber, and linked to it by a small channel which has sometimes been called a 'drain' although that is not believed to be its true purpose.

In 1898, excavations uncovered part of the upper chamber, and access was gained to the intact lower chamber. The site was fully excavated in 1937, at which time the upper chamber was covered with a domed roof. Finds included several skeletons, cremated bone, bowls, a mace-head, a flint arrowhead and scrapers, and shale disc beads.

The site is a scheduled monument in the care of Historic Environment Scotland, and the monument and chambers are open to the public.

== See also ==
- Prehistoric Orkney
- Timeline of prehistoric Scotland
