= Rousay =

One of the Orkney Islands

Romhsaigh (Gaelic); Rousee (Scots)
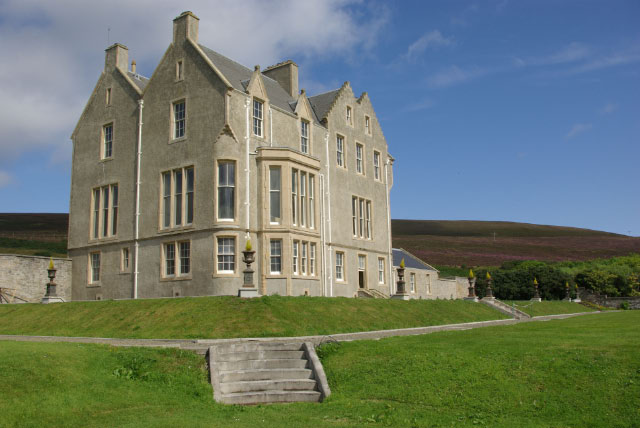
- Trumland on Rousay

Location
- Rousay shown within Orkney
- OS grid reference: HY407309
- Coordinates: 59.17°N 3.03°W

Name
- Name meaning: Old Norse for "Hrolf's island"
- Old Norse name: Hrólfsey

Physical geography
- Island group: Orkney
- Area: 4,860 hectares (18.8 sq mi)
- Area rank: 23
- Highest elevation: Blotchnie Fiold 249 metres (817 ft)

Administration
- Council area: Orkney Islands
- Country: Scotland
- Sovereign state: United Kingdom

Demographics
- Population: 236
- Population rank: 30
- Population density: 4.51 people/km^{2}
- Largest settlement: Brinian
- References: www.aroundrousay.co.uk/rousay.shtml

Rousay (/ˈraʊziː/, Scots: Rousee; Old Norse: Hrólfsey meaning Rolf's Island) is a small, hilly island about three kilometres (1 1/2 nautical miles) north of Mainland, the largest island in the Orkney Islands of Scotland. It has been nicknamed "Egypt of the north", due to its archaeological diversity and importance.

Like its neighbours Egilsay and Wyre, it can be reached by ro-ro ferry MV Eynhallow from Tingwall. This service is operated by Orkney Ferries, and can take up to 95 passengers (reduced to 50 in winter), and 10 cars. The ferry links the islands of Rousay, Egilsay, and Wyre with each other, and with the mainland of Orkney.

== Demographics ==
In the 2022 census, Rousay had a population of 236. Most employment is in farming, fishing or fish-farming; craft businesses and seasonal tourism-related work are present.

== Geography ==
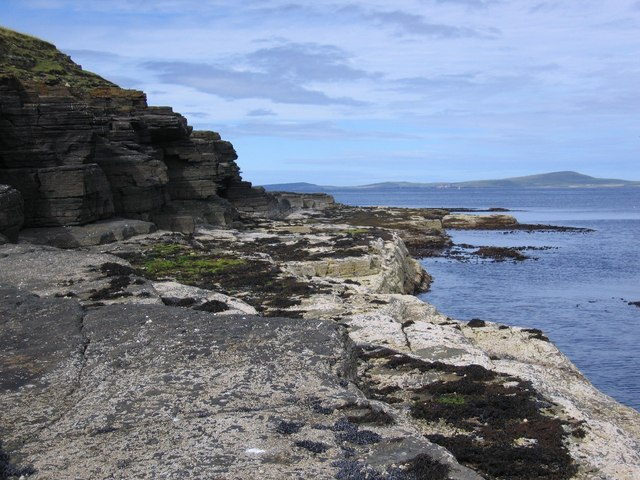
Cliffs in Saviskaill Bay, looking northward to Westray

It is separated from mainland Orkney by Eynhallow Sound. One road circles the island, about 14 miles (23 kilometres) long, and most arable land lies in the few hundred yards between it and the coastline. With an area of 4,860 hectares (12,010 acres), it is the fifth largest of the Orkney Islands. Among several freshwater lochs on the island, the biggest is Muckle Water.

== Natural history ==
Rousay is a 'Site of Special Scientific Interest' with notable cliff formations and wildflower colonies, and has an RSPB bird reserve. The hilliest Orkney island after Hoy, it offers good views of neighbouring islands from Blotchnifiold 249 metres (817 ft), and Keirfea or Knitchen (both over 229 m or 750 ft). Archaeological remains are present, especially a cluster of sites connected by a footpath near the western shore.

Its wildlife includes grey seals and European otters. Two sites, totaling some 630 ha, have been designated an Important Bird Area (IBA) by BirdLife International because they support breeding populations of moorland birds, including Arctic terns.

== History ==
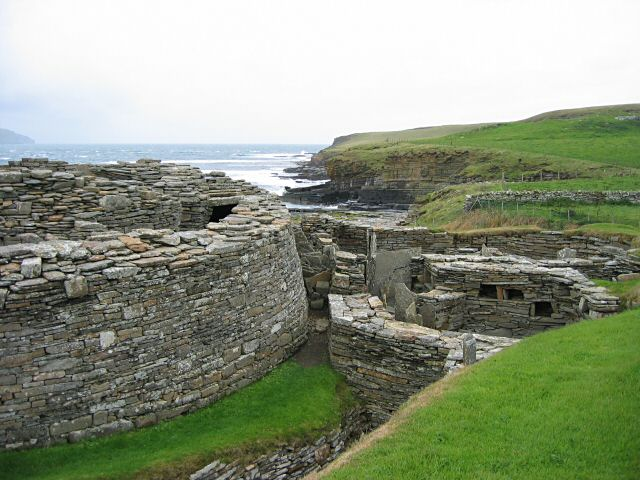
Midhowe Broch on the west coast of Rousay

Humans first made a Neolithic settlement at Rinyo. Other remnants include Bronze Age burnt mounds, Iron Age crannogs and brochs (the highest density anywhere in Scotland: three within 500 m or 550 yd of coastline), Viking boat burials, remains of a medieval church and a stately home at Trumland.

Over 100 archaeological sites have been identified. Only a small fraction have been excavated and characterized. The most spectacular of the sites is the complex of Midhowe Broch and Midhowe Chambered Cairn. Blackhammer Chambered Cairn, Taversoe Tuick, and Knowe of Yarso chambered cairn are important tombs.

Rousay placenames reflect its Norse heritage. 'Hrólfs-øy' or 'Hrolfsey' was based on the male name 'Hrolf' (Rolf). Hugh Marwick's work showed the name developing from 'Rollesay' in the 14th century, through 'Rolsay' in the 15th, and 'Rowsay' in the early 16th, with the spelling 'Rousay' first recorded in 1549.

Most Rousay people earned their living from farming and/or fishing. In the 19th century, records reflect tradespeople supplying the needs of a rural community: blacksmiths and joiners, shoemakers and shopkeepers, with women making dresses and plaiting straw. Throughout the century, Rousay's landlords demanded high rents from crofters, many of whom became homeless in a series of clearances along the western coast, ordered by landowner George William Traill in the 1820s and 1830s.

Traill's nephew General Sir Frederick Traill-Burroughs inherited much of the island and bought more. Traill-Burroughs built a large house at Trumland, designed by David Bryce of Edinburgh. From 1870 to 1883, improvements transformed the island: Trumland pier, island schools, a public market, the first steamship service, a post office, and the first resident doctor. He was known locally as "the little general" as he was a man of short stature. Poet Edwin Muir recalled in a memoir of his childhood seeing the little general walking around his estates.

Rousay's population in the mid-19th century was over 900, but emigration following land clearances reduced that to 627 by 1900, and half a century later it had fallen to 342. Depopulation accelerated, and in the next twenty years the number fell to 181, its lowest ever. From the 1970s onward new families settled on Rousay: most came from the south, especially from England. The population is now over 200.

The Yetnasteen stone is said to have once been a giant who revives every New Year at midnight and visits the Loch of Scockness to drink.

== Education ==
A primary school enrolls 24 boys and girls aged 3 to 12. Once a child completes his/her primary education, they attend Kirkwall Grammar School or Stromness Academy.

== Notables ==
Poet Pauline Stainer spent two years on the island, and in 1999 published a collection of her poems about Rousay, Parable Island.

Robert C. Marwick (1922–2013) was a school teacher, headmaster and author born on Innister farm, in the Wasbister district. His publications about Rousay include From My Rousay Schoolbag (1995), Rousay Roots (1995) and In Dreams We Moor (2000).

Actor Graham Fellows owns a disused church there, which he intended to turn into an "artists refuge".

Late artists' patron Margaret Gardiner spent a large part of her life there and in 1979 founded the Pier Art Gallery in Stromness.

== Rousay Sound ==
Rousay is separated from the neighbouring island of Egilsay by Rousay Sound. The sound experiences strong tides, which creates the perfect conditions for maerl beds to form. The maerl beds in turn provide a sheltered habitat for species such as peacock worms and various sponges, as well as small fish, shrimps, gobies and crabs. Since 2014 the sound, along with the neighbouring Wyre Sound (which separates Rousay from Wyre), has been designated as a Nature Conservation Marine Protected Area (NCMPA). Fishing activities are controlled within the MPA, and no dredging, beam trawling, demersal trawling or Seine fishing is permitted.

== See also ==
- List of islands of Scotland
