= Eynhallow Sound =

Coordinates: 59.131°N 3.076°W

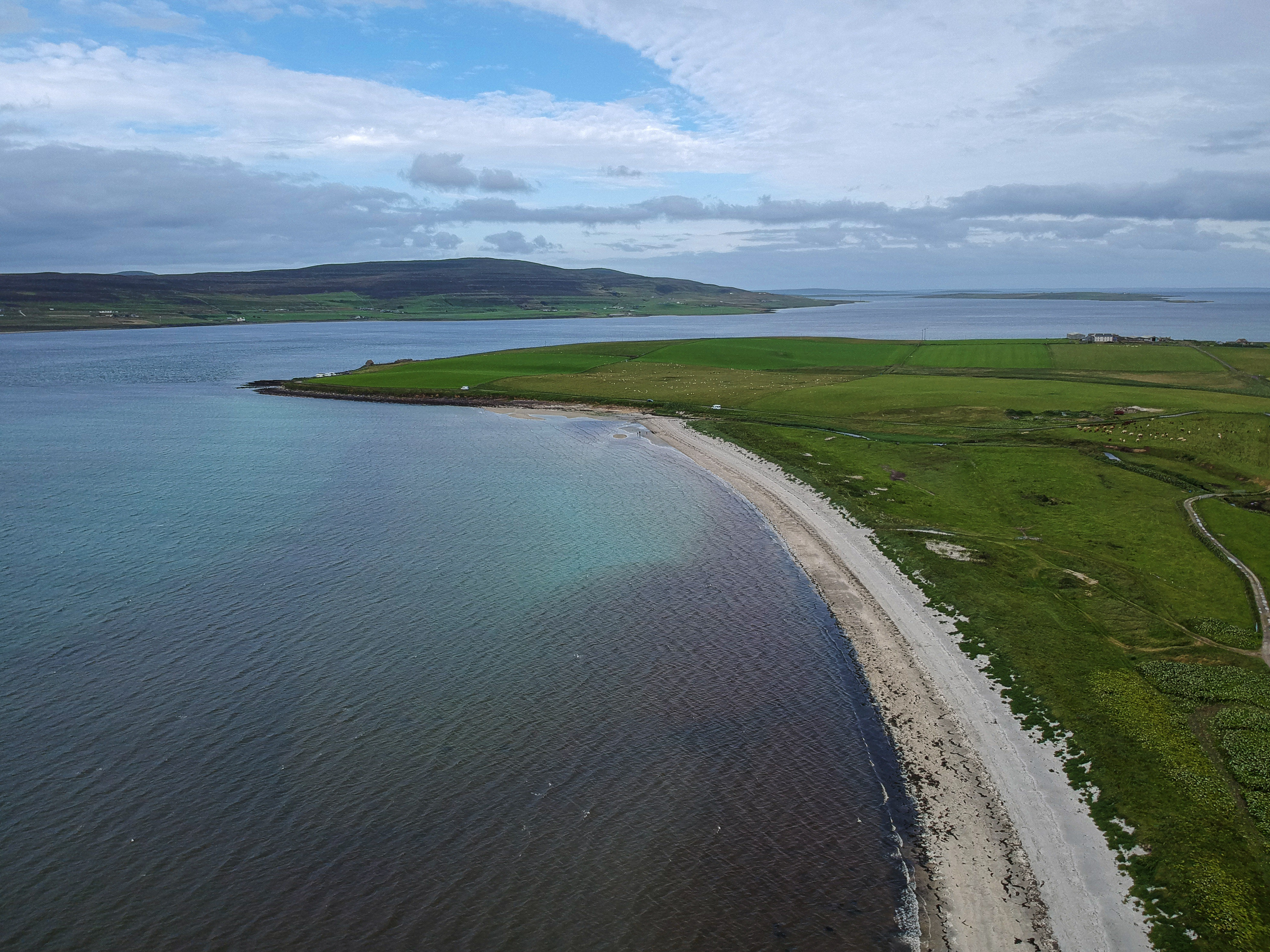
Looking across Eynhallow Sound from Sands of Evie to Rousay.

Eynhallow Sound is a seaway lying between Mainland Orkney and the island of Rousay in the Orkney Islands, Scotland. The tidal indraught is "scarcely felt beyond a line joining Costa Head and the Reef of Quendale". An Iron Age broch, Gurness, has a strategic outlook over the Eynhallow Sound.

== See also ==
- Evie, Orkney
- Sands of Evie
