= Broch of Gurness =

Iron Age village on Mainland, Orkney, Scotland

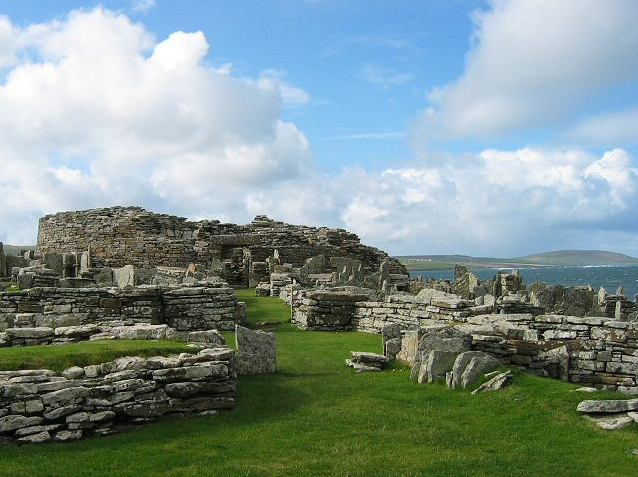
- Broch of Gurness

- Location within Orkney Islands
- 59.1239°N 3.0813°W
- Type: Iron age settlement
- Periods: Iron Age
- Location: Mainland, Orkney
- Region: Scotland

Site notes
- Owner: Historic Scotland
- Public access: Yes

Scheduled monument
- Official name: Aiker Ness, Broch of Gurness, broch and settlement
- Designated: 4 May 1994
- Reference no.: SM90157

The Broch of Gurness is an Iron Age broch village on the northeast coast of Mainland Orkney in Scotland overlooking Eynhallow Sound, about 15 miles north-west of Kirkwall. It once housed a substantial community. It was discovered by the Orkney poet and naturalist Robert Rendall in 1929.

== Description ==
Settlement here began sometime between 500 and 200 BC. At the centre of the settlement is a stone tower or broch, which once probably reached a height of around 10 metres. Its interior is divided into sections by upright slabs. The tower features two skins of drystone walls, with stone-floored galleries in between. These are accessed by steps. Stone ledges suggest that there was once an upper storey with a timber floor. The roof would have been thatched, surrounded by a wall walk linked by stairs to the ground floor. The broch features two hearths and a subterranean stone cistern with steps leading down into it (resembling the set-up at Mine Howe). It is thought to have some religious significance, relating to an Iron Age cult of the underground.

The remains of the central tower are up to 3.6 metres (11.8 ft) high, and the stone walls are up to 4.1 metres (13.5 ft) thick.

The roof probably was conical or mildly hyperbolic.

The tower was likely inhabited by the principal family or clan of the area but also served as a last resort for the village in case of an attack.

The broch continued to be inhabited while it began to collapse and the original structures were altered. The cistern was filled in and the interior was repartitioned. The ruin visible today reflects this secondary phase of the broch's use.

The site is surrounded by three ditches cut out of the rock with stone ramparts, encircling an area of around 45 metres diameter. The remains of numerous small stone dwellings with small yards and sheds can be found between the inner ditch and the tower. These were built after the tower, but were a part of the settlement's initial conception. A "main street" connects the outer entrance to the broch. The settlement is the best-preserved of all broch villages.

Pieces of a Roman amphora dating to before 60 AD were found here, lending weight to the record that a "King of Orkney" submitted to Emperor Claudius at Colchester in 43 AD.

At some point after 100 AD the broch was abandoned and the ditches filled in. It is thought that settlement at the broch continued into the 5th century AD, the period known as Pictish times. By that time the broch was not used anymore and some of its stones were reused to build smaller dwellings on top of the earlier buildings. Until about the 8th century, the site was just a single farmstead.

In the 9th century, a Norse woman was buried at the site in a stone-lined grave with two bronze brooches and a sickle and knife made from iron. Other finds suggest that Norse men were buried here too.

The broch is in the care of Historic Environment Scotland.

== Gallery ==
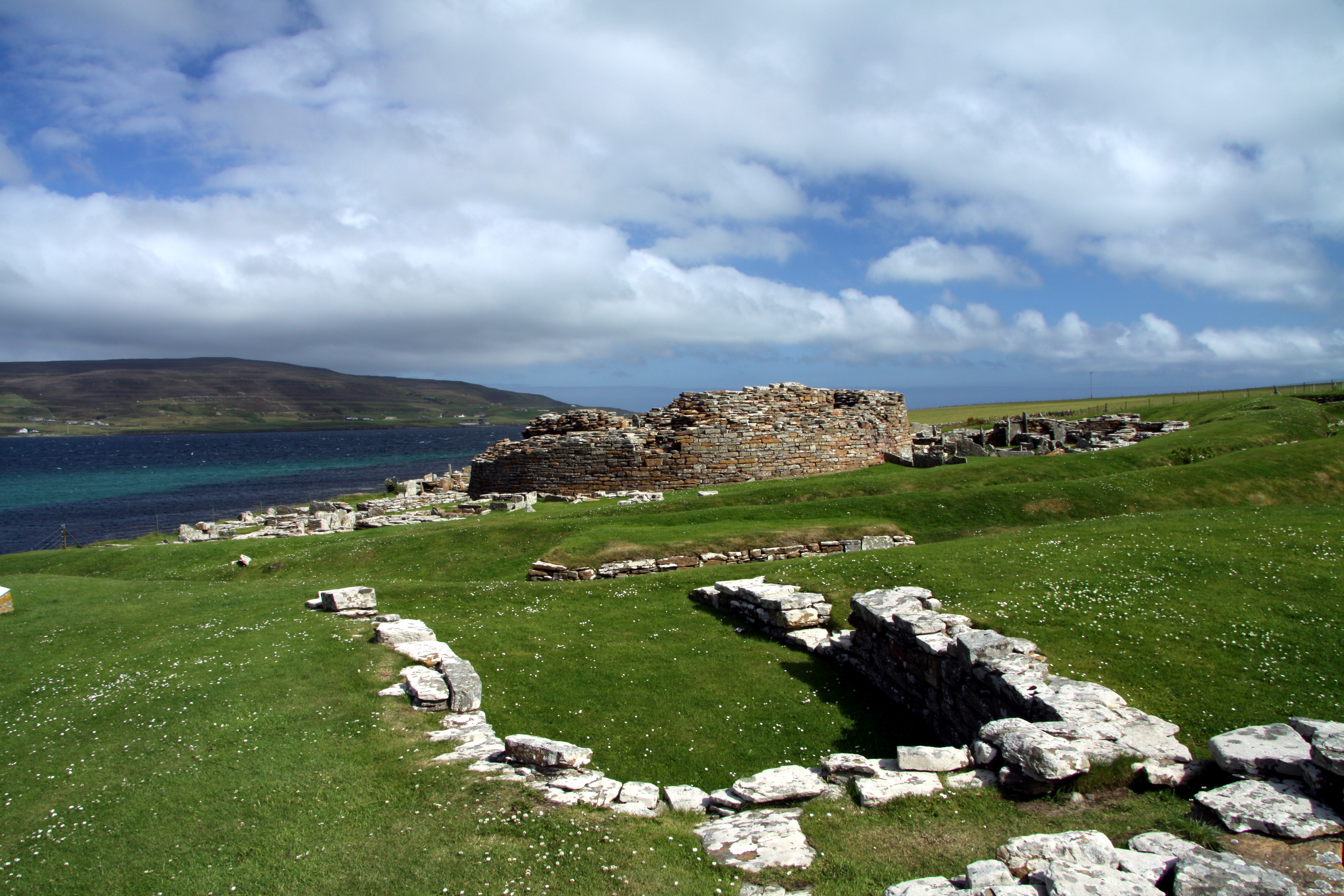
Broch of Gurness

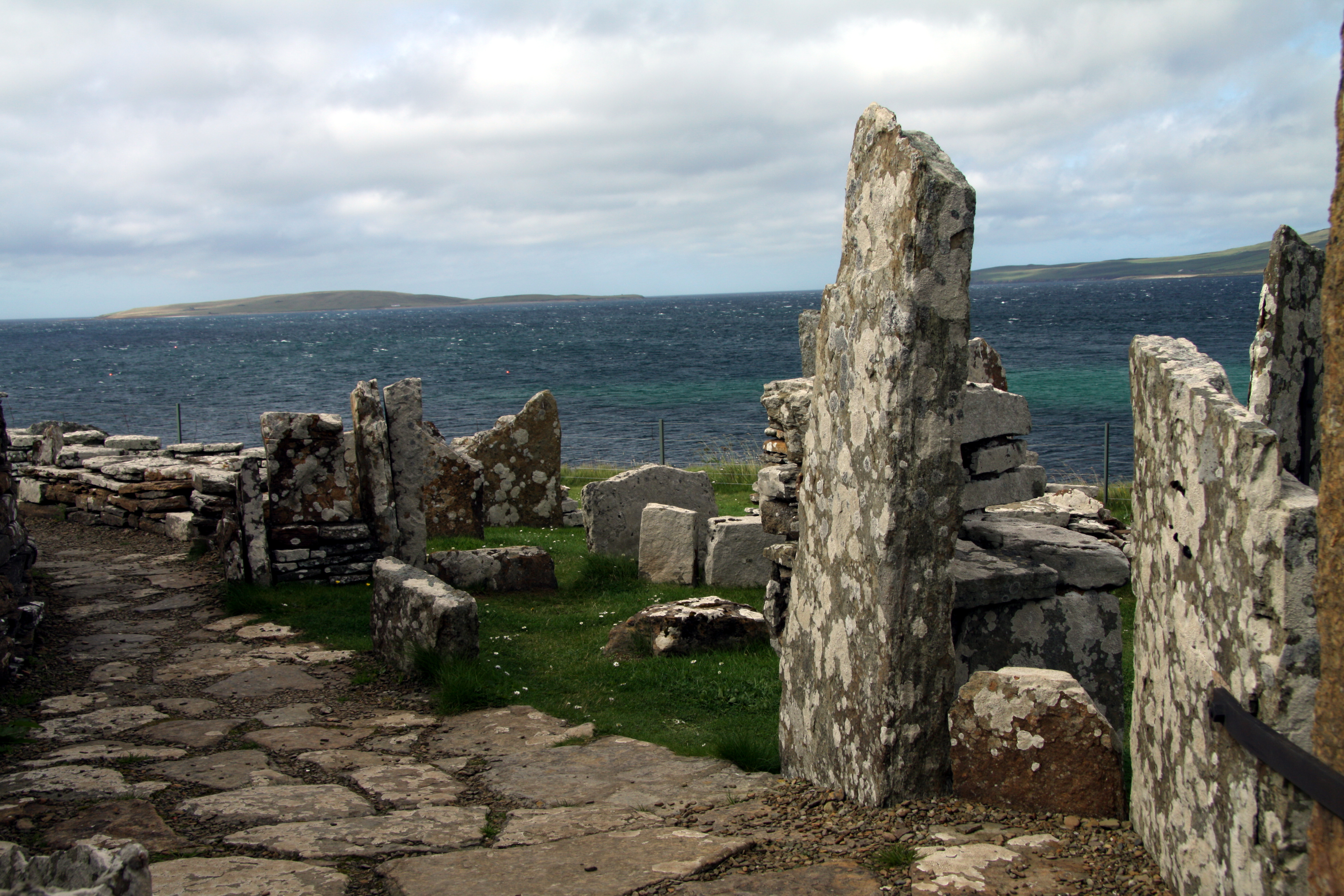

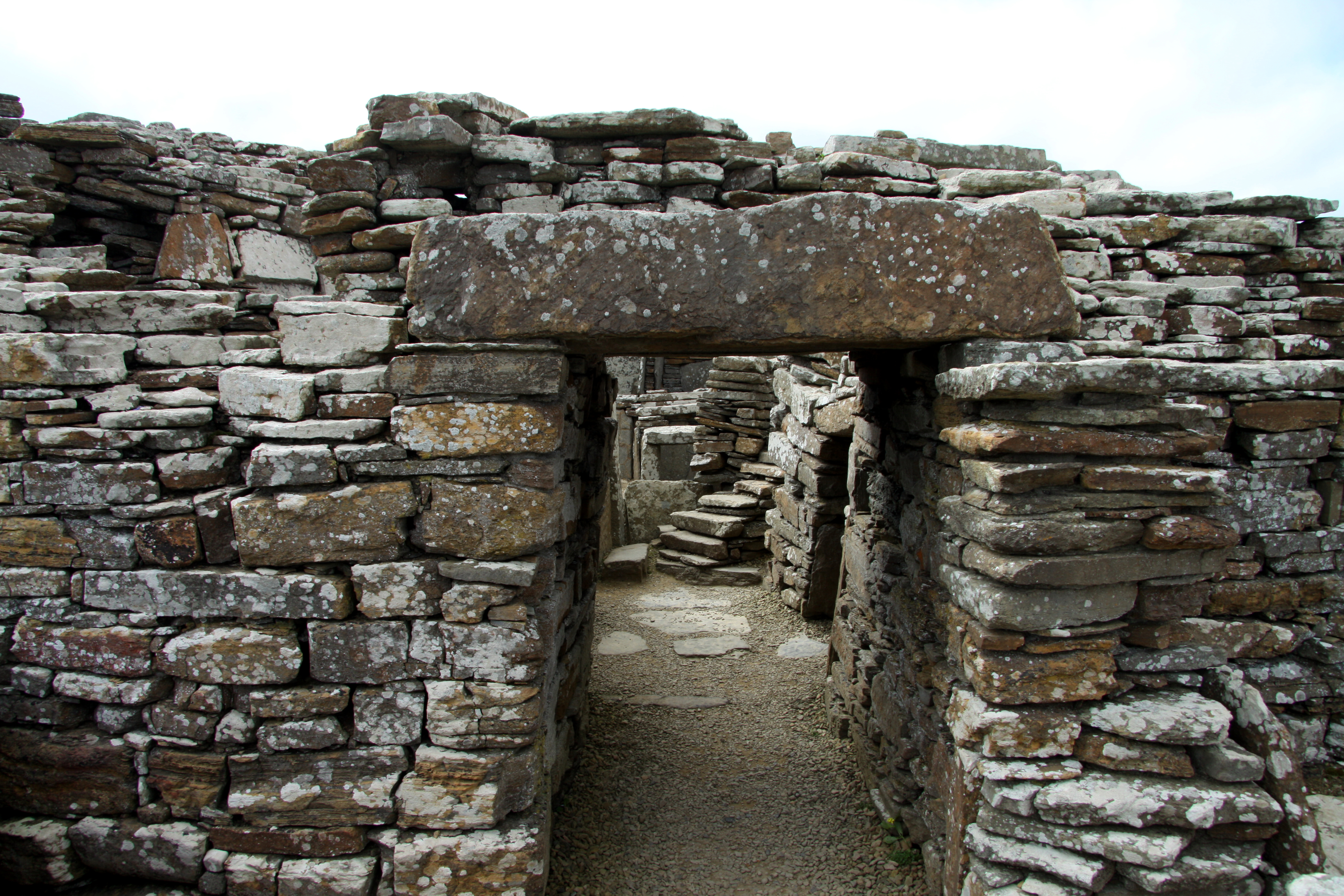
Entrance to the main building

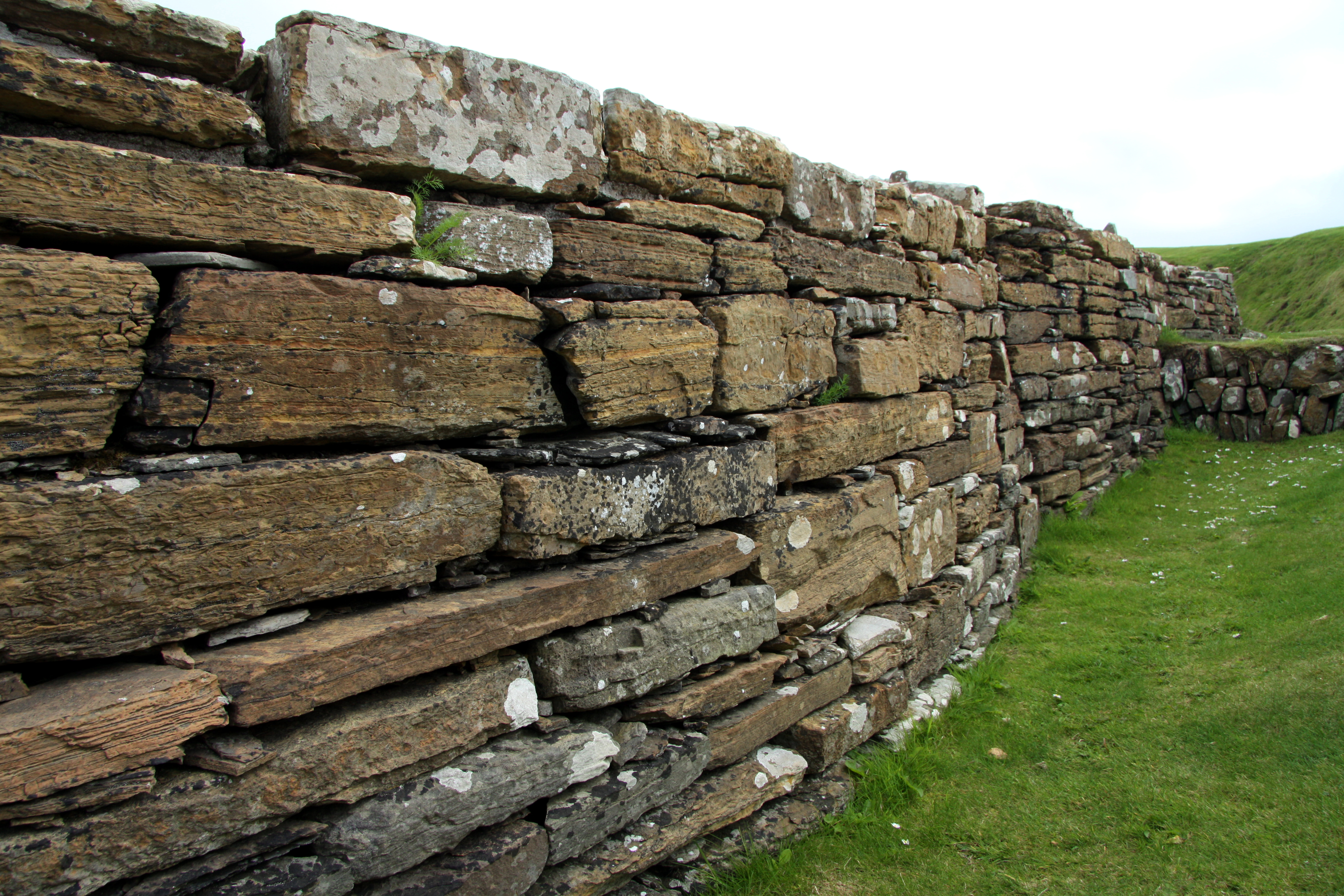
Detail of the wall

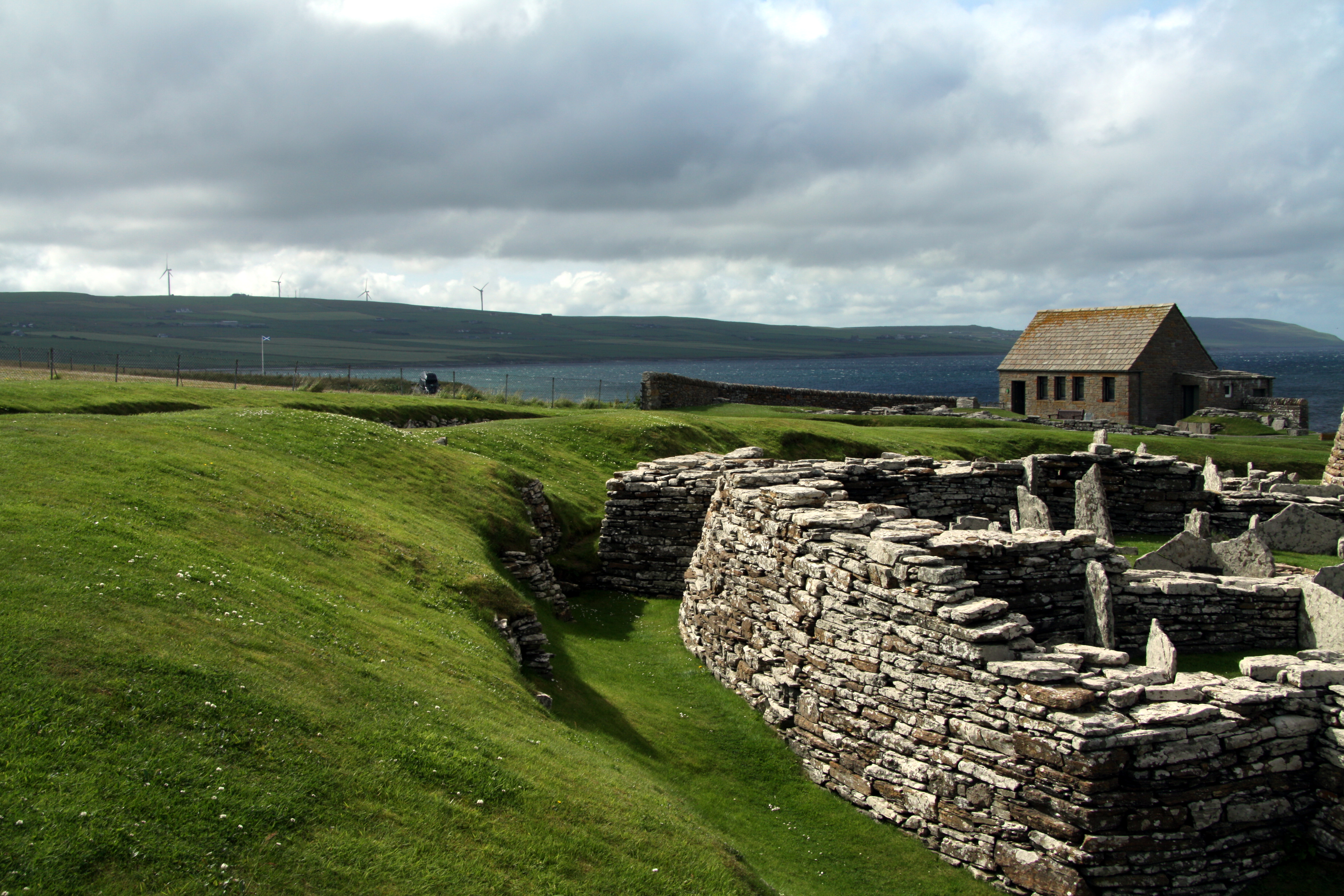

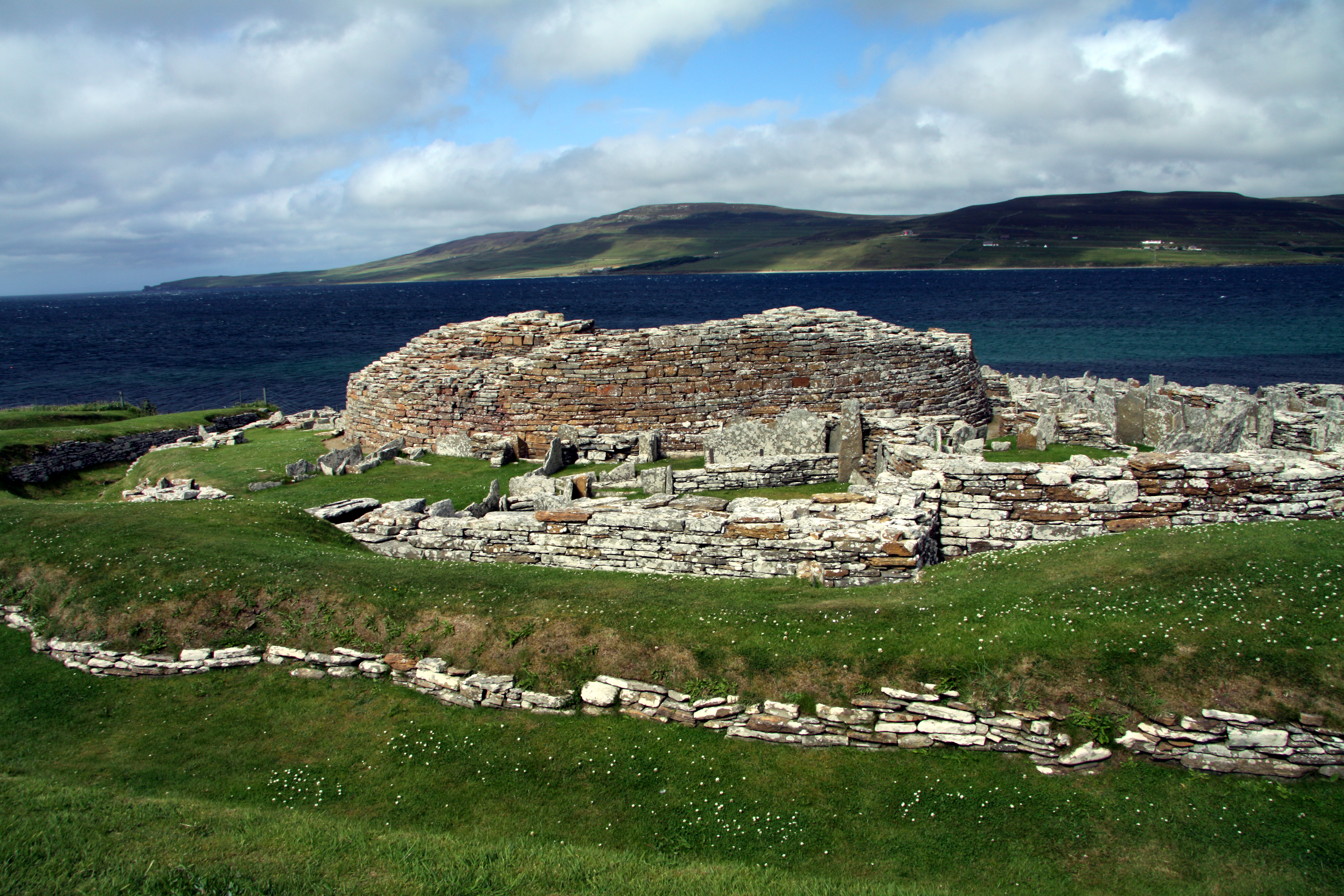
View from the south

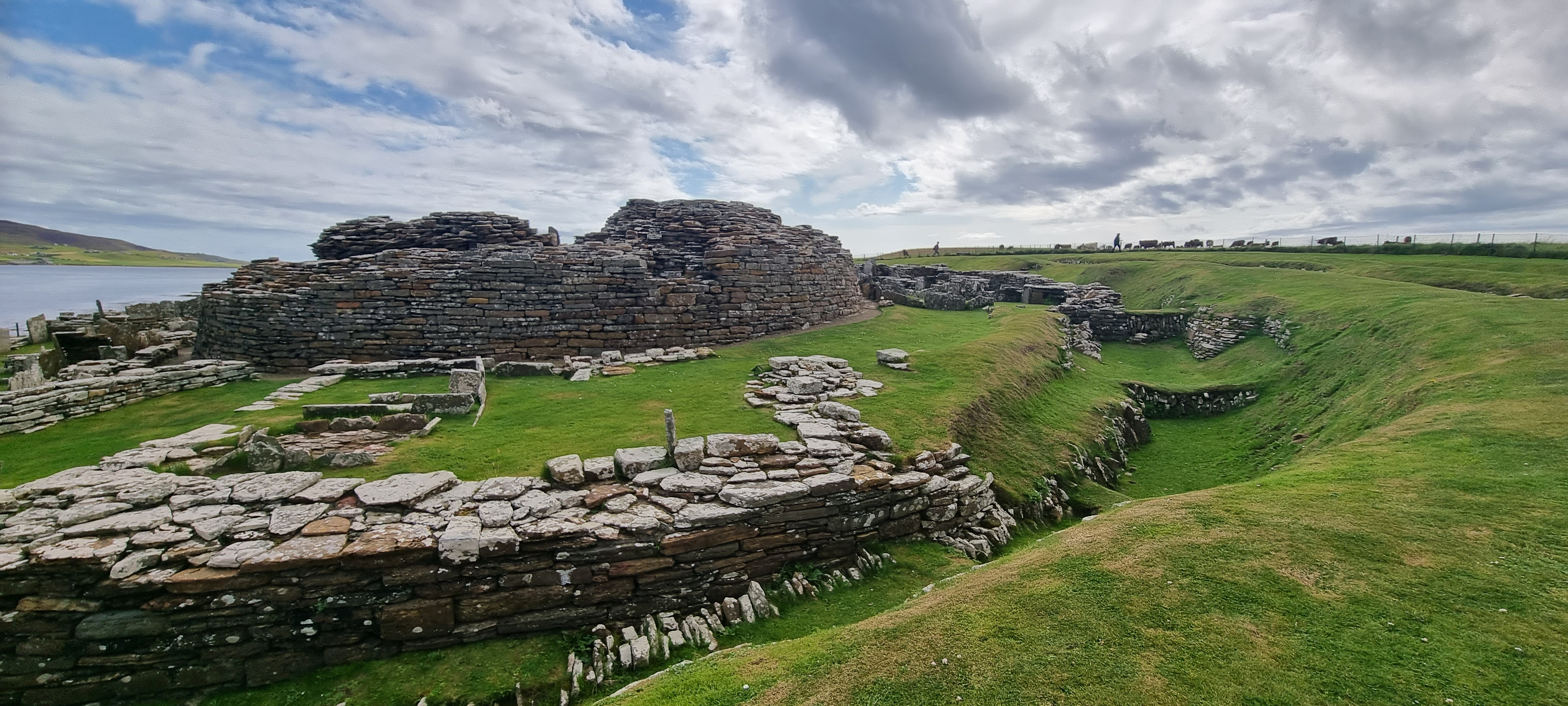
Broch of Gurness

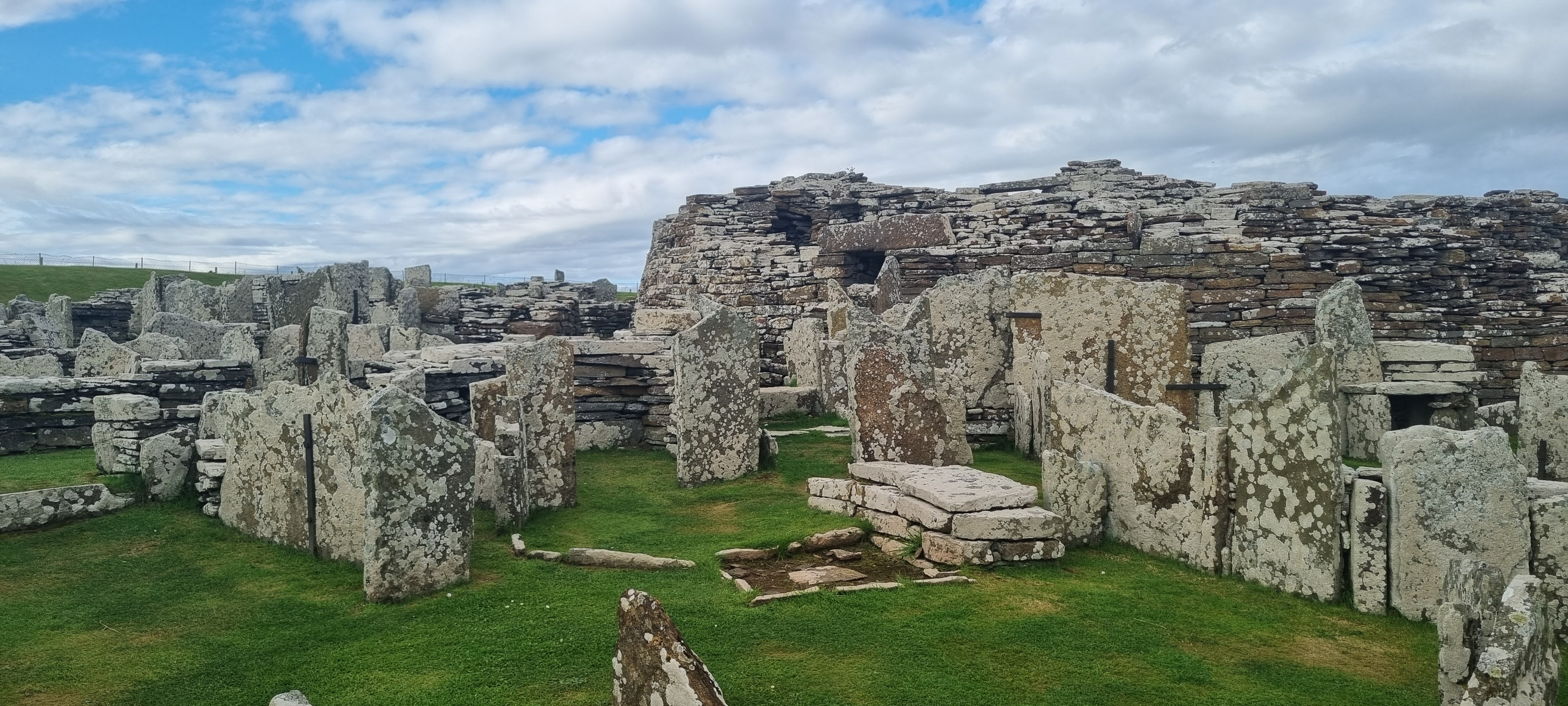
Broch of Gurness

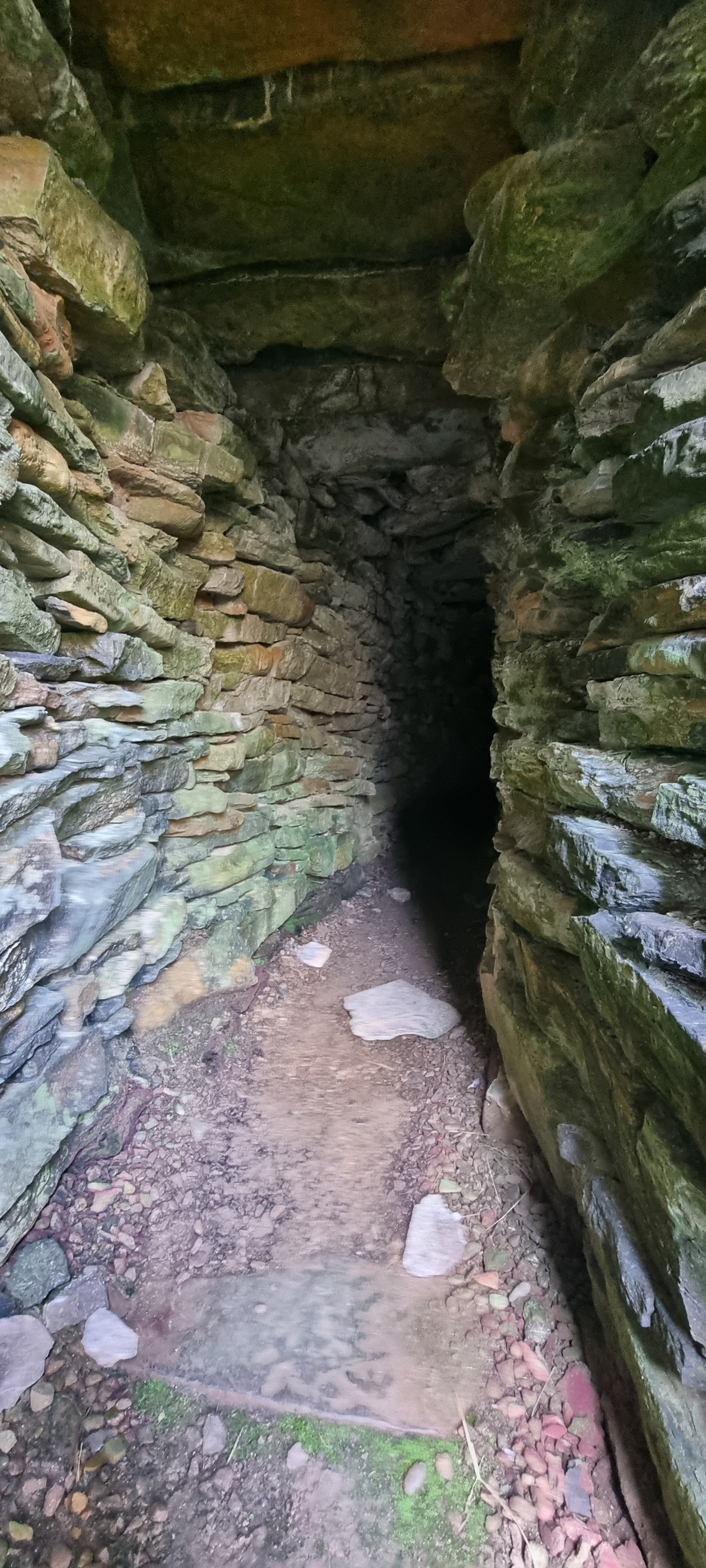
Broch of Gurness

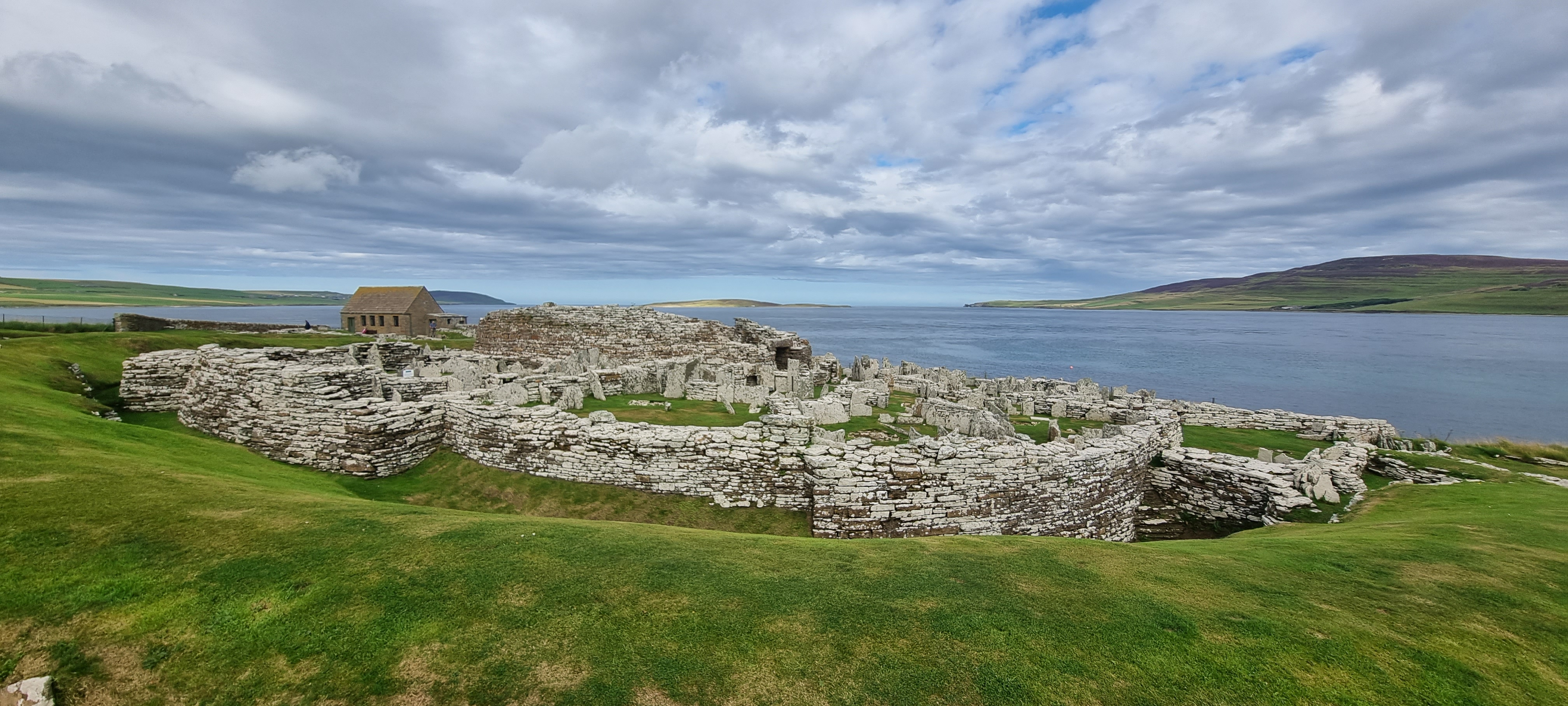
Broch of Gurness

== See also ==
- Brough of Birsay
- Point of Hellia
- Sands of Evie
