= Prehistoric art in Scotland =

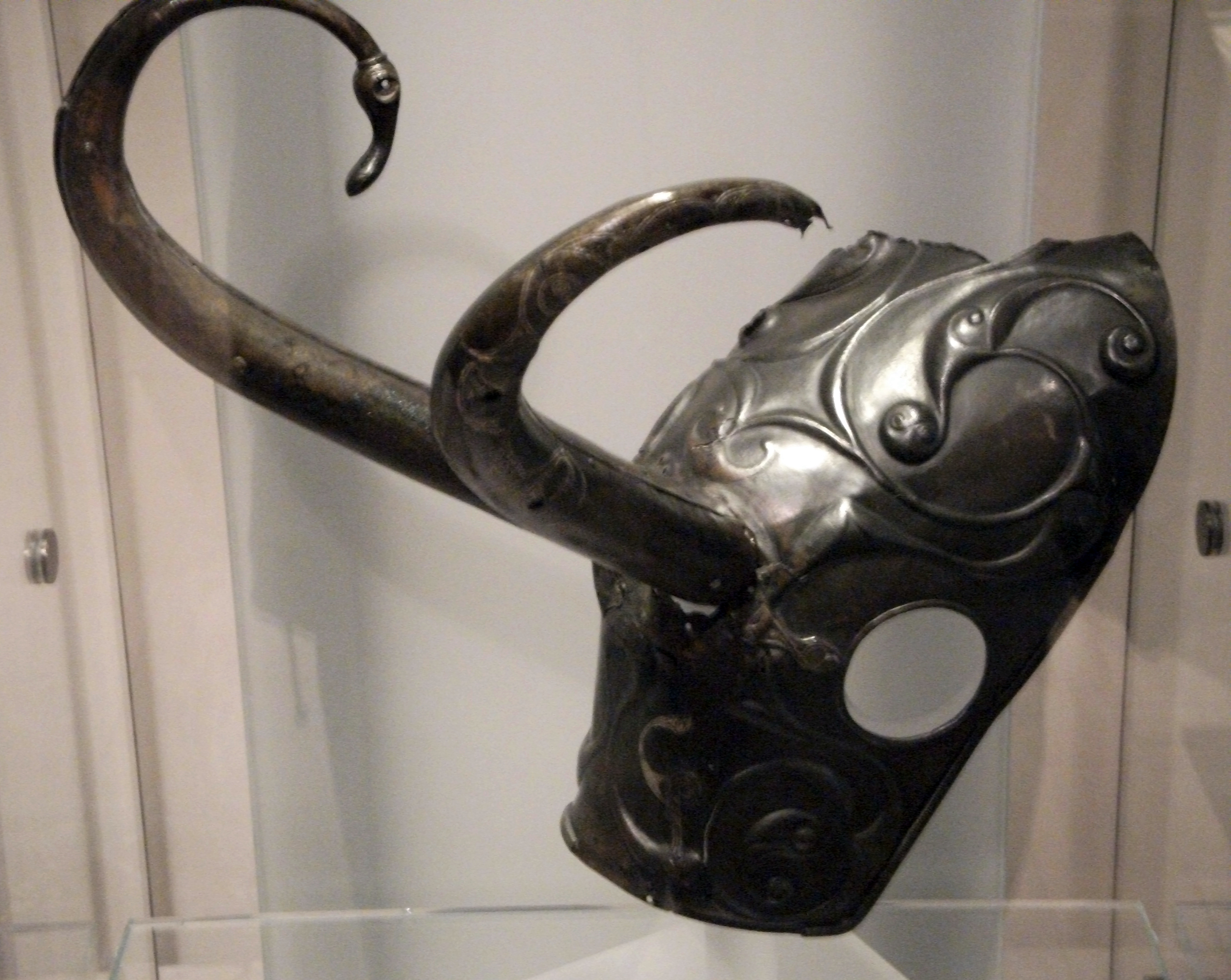
The Torrs Pony-cap and Horns, around 200 BCE, National Museum of Scotland, as displayed in 2011

Prehistoric art in Scotland is visual art created or found within the modern borders of Scotland, before the departure of the Romans from southern and central Britain in the early fifth century CE, which is usually seen as the beginning of the early historic or Medieval era. There is no clear definition of prehistoric art among scholars and objects that may involve creativity often lack a context that would allow them to be understood.

The earliest examples of portable art from what is now Scotland are highly decorated carved stone balls from the Neolithic period, which share patterns with Irish and Scottish stone carvings. Other items from this period include elaborate carved maceheads and figurines from Links of Noltland, including the Westray Wife, which is the earliest known depiction of a human face from Scotland.

From the Bronze Age there are examples of carvings, including the first representations of objects, and cup and ring marks. Representations of an axe and a boat at the Ri Cruin Cairn in Kilmartin, and a boat pecked into Wemyss Cave, are probably the oldest two-dimensional representations of real objects that survive in Scotland. Elaborate carved stone battle-axes may be symbolic representations of power. Surviving metalwork includes gold lunula or neckplates, jet beaded necklaces and elaborate weaponry, such as leaf swords and ceremonial shields of sheet bronze.

From the Iron Age there are more extensive examples of patterned objects and gold work. Evidence of the wider La Tène culture includes the Torrs Pony-cap and Horns. The Stirling torcs demonstrate common styles found in Scotland and Ireland and continental workmanship. One of the most impressive items from this period is the boar's head fragment of the Deskford carnyx. From the first century CE, as Rome carried out a series of occupations, there are Roman artifacts like the Cramond Lioness and Roman influence on material culture can be seen in local stone carvings.

== Definitions and meanings ==
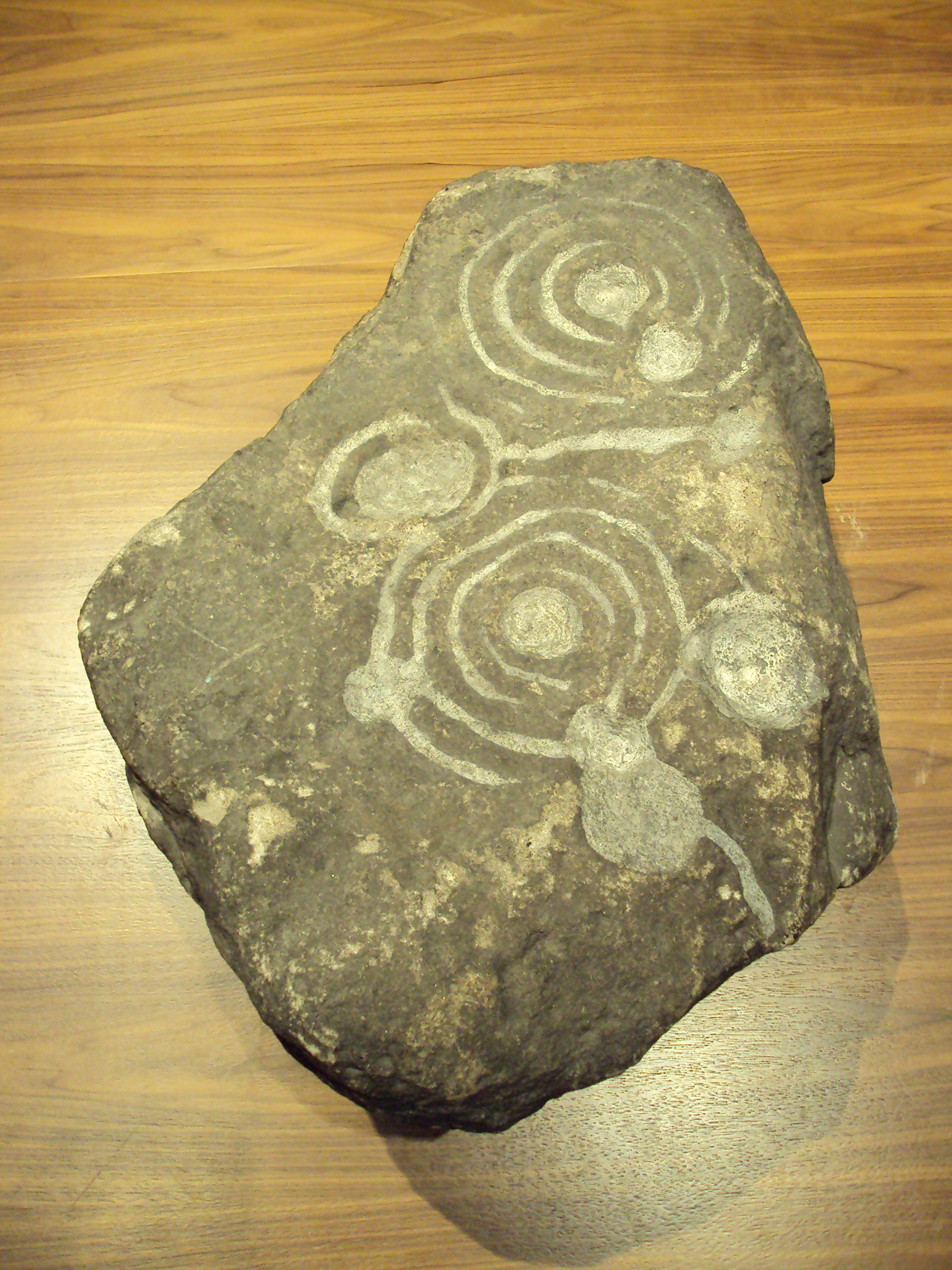
Cup and ring marks survive in large numbers from Scotland and have been suggested to have a variety of meanings

The ability to study prehistoric art is dependent on surviving artifacts. Art created in mediums such as sand, bark, hides and textiles has not normally endured, while less-perishable materials, such as rock, stone, bone, ivory (and to a lesser extent wood), later pottery and metal, are more likely to be extant. Whether all these artifacts can be defined as works of art is contested between scholars. Alexander Marshack argued that the earliest, non-representational incisions on rock mark the beginnings of human art. More cautiously, Paul Mellars suggests that the relative rarity of these works means they cannot be seen as integral to early human society and evidence of an artistic culture.

Colin Renfrew has pointed out the dangers of applying modern values of art to past societies and cultures. Günter Berghaus argues that these works have often been approached with a set of post-Renaissance aesthetic values that distinguish between artists and craftsman and art and artifact, although these categories are not universal and may be inappropriate for understanding prehistoric society. Duncan Garrow has pointed to the difficulties of the modern distinction drawn between form and decoration. The emphasis in studies of prehistoric art tend to be placed on decoration in objects such as ceramics and ignores the importance of form, found in objects such as weapons.

Many meanings have been suggested for the advent and nature of prehistoric art. It may have helped develop human solidarity in its early stages. Open air rock art may have acted as signposts for the route of animal migrations. Cave art may have had a ritual role in rites of initiation, vision quests or totemic ceremonies. Portable objects may have acted as notation systems and anthropomorphic figures may have had a role in religious rituals. However, most artifacts can only be understood in their context, which is often lost or poorly understood.

== Stone Age ==
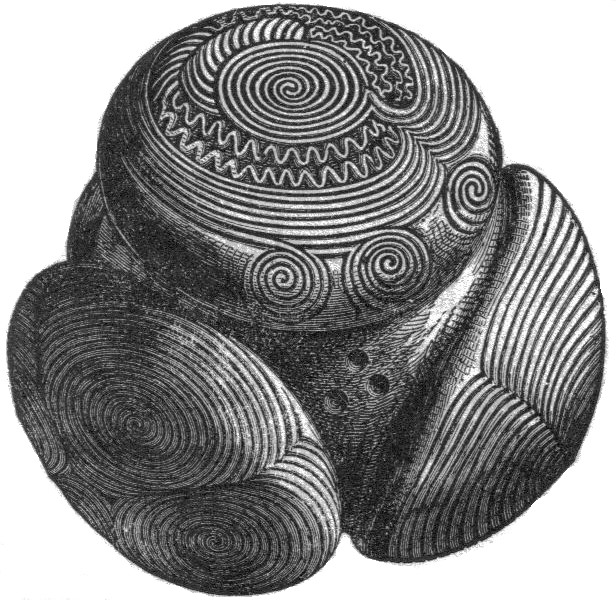
An example of a carved stone ball from Towie in Aberdeenshire, dated from 3200–2500 BCE

Scotland was occupied by Mesolithic hunter-gatherers from around 8500 BCE, who were highly mobile boat-using people making tools from bone, stone and antlers. Neolithic farming brought permanent settlements, like the stone house at Knap of Howar on Papa Westray, dating from around 3500 BCE. The settlers also introduced chambered cairn tombs, as at Maeshowe, and the many standing stones and circles such as those at Stenness on the mainland of Orkney, which dates from about 3100 BCE, and similar stones to which are found across Europe from about the same time.

There is no surviving art from the Mesolithic period in Scotland, probably because the mobile peoples of the period would have made this on perishable organic items. Probably the oldest surviving portable visual art from Scotland are carved stone balls, or petrospheres, that date from the late Neolithic era. They are a uniquely Scottish phenomenon, with over 425 known examples. Most are from modern Aberdeenshire, but a handful of examples are known from Iona, Skye, Harris, Uist, Lewis, Arran, Hawick, Wigtownshire and fifteen from Orkney, five of which were found at the Neolithic village of Skara Brae. Many functions have been suggested for these objects, most indicating that they were prestigious and powerful possessions. Their production may have continued into the Iron Age. The complex carved circles and spirals on these balls can be seen mirrored in the carving on what was probably a lintel from a chambered cairn at Pierowall on Westray, Orkney, which seem to be part of the same culture that produced carvings at Newgrange in Ireland. Similarly, elaborately carved maceheads are often found in burial sites, like that found at Airdens in Sutherland, which has a pattern of interlocking diamond-shaped facets, similar to those found across Neolithic Britain and Europe.

Pottery appeared in the Neolithic period once hunters and gatherers transitioned to a sedentary lifestyle, until then they needed to use lightweight, mobile containers. Finely made and decorated Unstan ware, survives from the fourth and third millennia BCE and is named after the Unstan Chambered Cairn on the Mainland of the Orkney Islands. Typical are elegant and distinctive shallow bowls with a band of grooved patterning below the rim, using a technique known as "stab-and-drag". A second variation consists of undecorated, round-bottomed bowls. Unstan ware is mostly found in tombs, specifically tombs of the Orkney-Cromarty type, that include the so-called Tomb of the Eagles at Isbister on South Ronaldsay, and Taversoe Tuick and Midhowe on Rousay, but has occasionally been found outside of tombs, as at the farmstead of Knap of Howar on Papa Westray. There are scattered occurrences of Unstan ware on the Scottish Mainland, as at Balbridie, and in the Western Isles, as at Eilean Domhnuill. Unstan ware may have evolved into the later grooved ware style, associated with the builders of the Maeshowe class of chambered tomb, which began on Orkney early in the third millennium BCE, and was soon adopted throughout Britain and Ireland. Grooved ware vessels are often highly decorated and flat bottomed, often with patterns similar to those on petrospheres and carved maceheads.

In 2009 the Westray Wife, a lozenge-shaped figurine that is believed to be the earliest representation of a human face found in Scotland, was discovered at the site of a Neolithic village at Links of Noltland near Grobust Bay on the north coast of Westray. The figurine's face has two dots for eyes, heavy brows and an oblong nose and a pattern of hatches on the body could represent clothing. Two figurines were subsequently found at the site in 2010 and 2012.

== Bronze Age ==
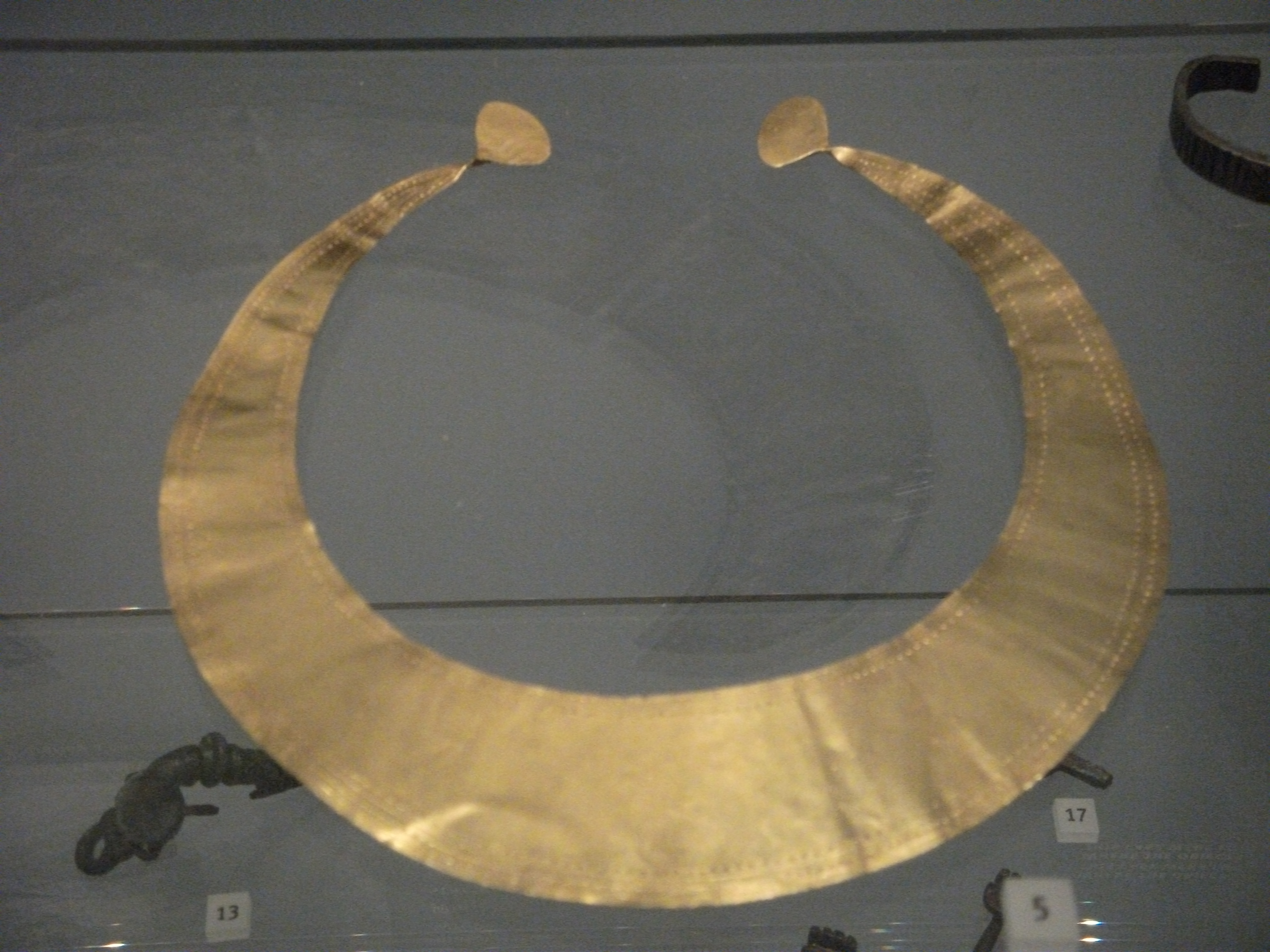
A gold lunula, one of two found at Southside in Lanarkshire, a high status ornament, worn sometime between 2300 and 2000 BCE

The Bronze Age began in Scotland about 2000 BCE as new techniques of metalworking began to reach northern Britain. The creation of cairns and Megalithic monuments continued. There was probably a fall in population in this period. There is evidence of cellular round houses of stone in Shetland and wooden crannogs, roundhouses partially or entirely built on artificial islands. As elsewhere in Europe, hill forts were first introduced in this period.

From this period there are extensive examples of rock art. These include cup and ring marks, a central depression carved into stone, surrounded by rings, sometimes not completed. These are common elsewhere in Atlantic Europe and have been found on natural rocks and isolated stones across Scotland. The most elaborate sets of markings are in western Scotland, particularly in the Kilmartin district. The representations of an axe and a boat at the Ri Cruin Cairn in Kilmartin, and a boat pecked into Wemyss Cave, are probably the oldest two-dimensional representations of real objects that survive in Scotland. Similar carved spirals have also been found on the cover stones of burial cists in Lanarkshire and Kincardine.

There are also elaborate carved stone battle-axes found in East Lothian, Aberdeenshire and Lanarkshire. These show little sign of use or wear, and so, rather than being practical objects, may be symbolic representations of power. Similarly, the site at Forteviot, in Perthshire, produced a unique warrior burial under a giant sandstone slab. The slab is engraved with a spiral and has an axehead pecked into the underside, and underneath there are grave goods of a copper dagger with leather scabbard and a carved wooden bowl.

Surviving metalwork includes personal items like the gold lunula or neckplates found at Auchentaggart in Dumfriesshire and Southside, Lanarkshire, which date from about 2000 BCE and are similar to those found in relatively large numbers in Ireland, but also with examples across Great Britain and in Portugal. Jet beaded necklaces strung in a crescent shape have been found at sites including Poltalloch and Melfort in Argyll and Aberlemno in Angus.

Sophisticated pottery with impressed designs was found in Scotland during the Bronze Age. One example is a decorated grave food vessel dated from about 1000 BCE that was found at a Kincardineshire grave group. Two bronze armlets were also found at the site.

Elaborate weaponry includes bronze leaf swords and ceremonial shields of sheet bronze made in Scotland between 900 and 600 BCE. The Migdale Hoard is an early Bronze Age find at Skibo Castle that includes two bronze axes; several pairs of armlets and anklets, a necklace of forty bronze beads, ear pendants and bosses of bronze and jet buttons. The "Ballachulish Goddess" or Ballachulish figure is a life-sized female figure from 700–500 BCE in alder (thought to be oak upon discovery) with quartz pebbles for eyes, found at Ballachulish, Argyll.

== Iron Age ==
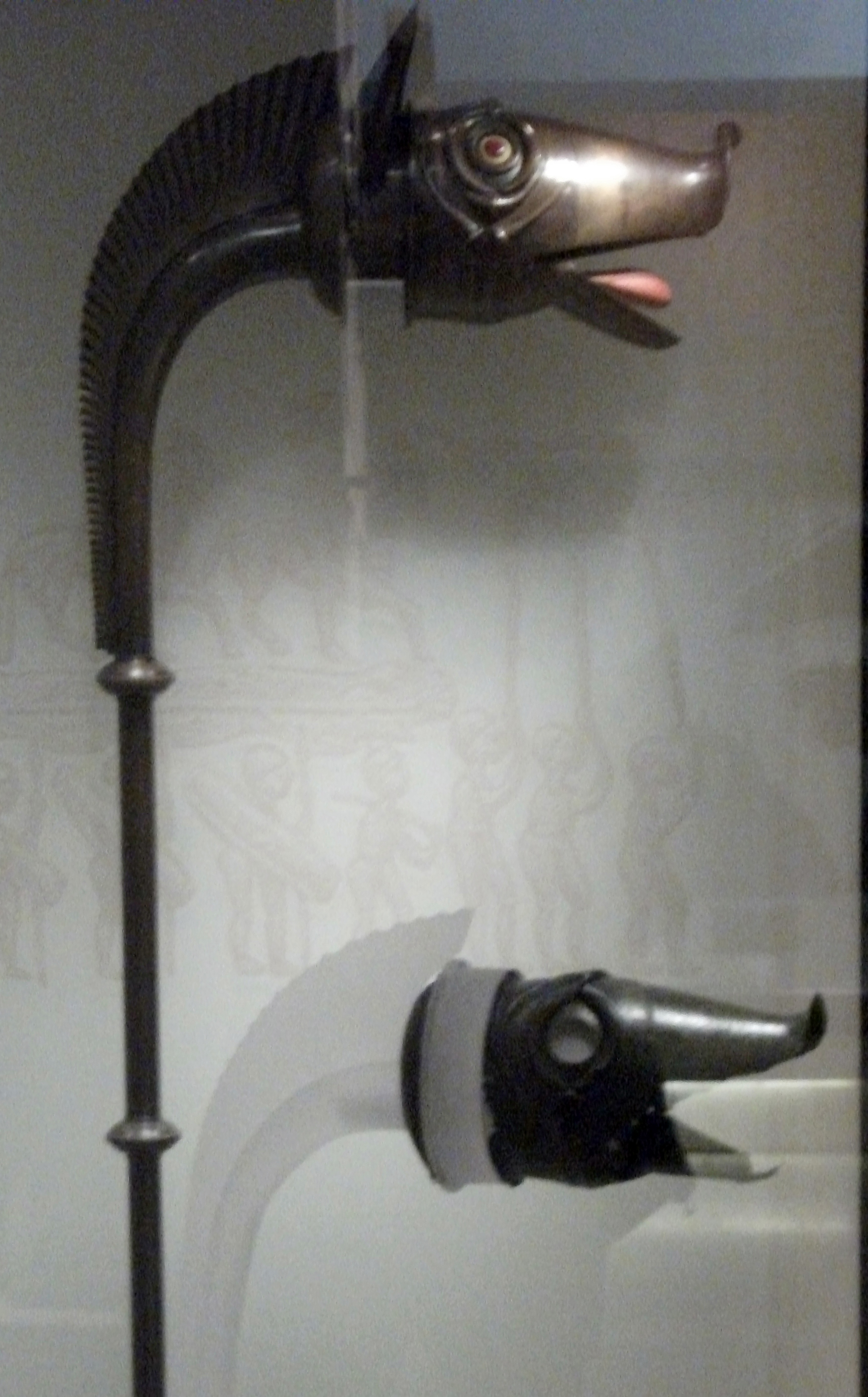
The Leichestown Deskford carnyx and reconstruction, probably dating from the first century CE

The Iron Age began in Scotland from about the seventh century BCE. From this point there are the first finds of iron artifacts in hoards that are consistent containing other items that are consistent with Bronze Age practice. there is also evidence of smithing and smelting on some settlement sites. Iron Age society in Scotland shared many traits with Southern Britain, Ireland and in some cases continental Europe. These included roundhouses and enclosed and fortified settlements, but it also contained elements of independent development.

From the early part of the period there is relatively little metalwork and a larger amount of ceramics. The assemblage of early Iron Age ceramics from Atlantic Scotland is large compared with the rest of Britain. There are a wide variety of forms and styles, some which resemble those of southern Britain, particularly those with incised geometric ornament.

By this period Scotland had been penetrated by the wider La Tène culture, which is named after the archaeological site of La Tène on the north side of Lake Neuchâtel in Switzerland. The Torrs Pony-cap and Horns are perhaps the most impressive of the relatively few finds of La Tène decoration from Scotland, and indicate links with Ireland and southern Britain. The Stirling torcs, found in 2009, are a group of four gold torcs in different styles, dating from 300 BCE and 100 BCE. Two demonstrate common styles found in Scotland and Ireland, but the other two indicate workmanship from what is now southern France, and the Greek and Roman worlds.

There are surviving ring-headed pins, which were probably made locally and not imported, and appear to be part of a British and Irish type that was not part of the La Tène culture. There are also spiral finger rings, glass beads and long-handled combs, which are found across Britain, but have local characteristics. The bronze Stichill collar is a large engraved necklace, fastened at the back with a pin. The Mortonhall scabbard, probably from the first century CE, is elaborately decorated with trumpet curves and "S"-scrolls. Further north there are finds of massive bronze armlets, often with enamelled decoration, like the ones found at Culbin Sands, Moray. One of the most impressive items from this period is the boars head fragment of the Deskford carnyx, a war-trumpet from Deskford in Banffshire, probably dating from the first century CE. Similar instruments are mentioned in Roman sources and depicted on the Gundestrup Cauldron found in Denmark.

In stone carving there are a number of simple stone heads from Scotland, like that found at Coupar Angus in Perthshire, that may date from the Iron Age. They are similar to those found across Great Britain and Ireland, although they are difficult to date and may have been made much later.

== Roman influence ==
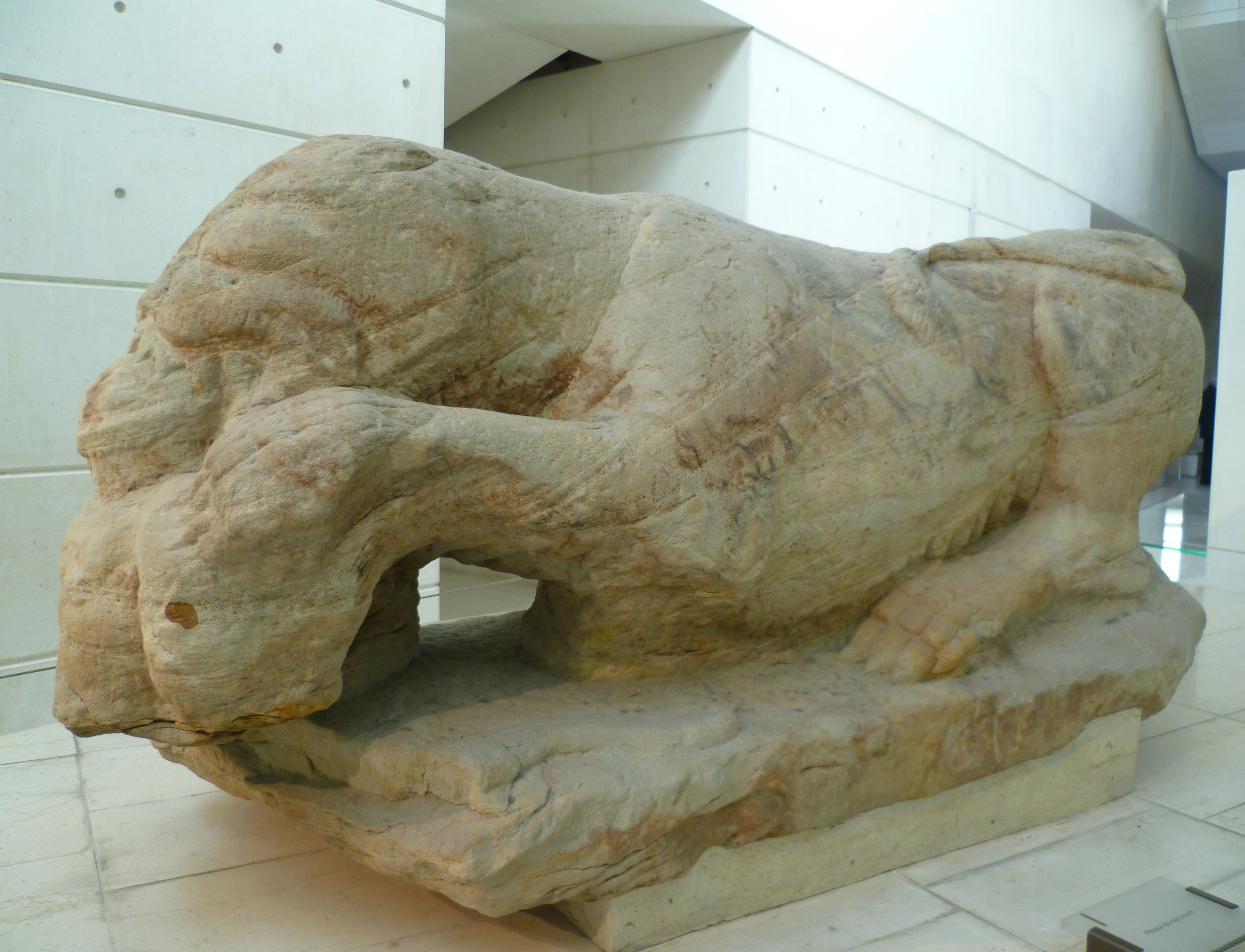
The Cramond Lioness found near the Roman base of Cramond Roman Fort near Edinburgh, which was occupied in the second century CE

The Romans began military expeditions into what is now Scotland from about 71 CE, building a series of forts, but by 87 the occupation was limited to the Southern Uplands and by the end of the first century the northern limit of Roman expansion was a line drawn between the Tyne and Solway Firth. The Romans eventually withdrew to a line in what is now northern England, building the fortification known as Hadrian's Wall from coast to coast. Around 141 CE they undertook a reoccupation of southern Scotland, moving up to construct a new limes between the Firth of Forth and the Firth of Clyde, where they built the fortification known as the Antonine Wall. The wall was overrun and abandoned soon after 160 and the Romans withdrew back to the line of Hadrian's Wall, until Roman authority collapsed in the early fifth century.

The Antonine Wall and its associated forts left a direct sculptural legacy in Scotland. There are 19 distance slabs along the wall that depict graphically the victories and marches of the legions involved in its construction. There are also surviving sculptures, including an altar to Diana and Apollo. There is a fountainhead from a bath-house in the shape of a man's head with a gaping mouth, and the head from a bust or statue, perhaps the goddess Fortuna, both found at Bearsden Roman Fort, East Dunbartonshire, both showing a local Celtic influence in their style.

Away from the wall, Roman sculptures include the marble head of a Roman emperor or general, broken from a larger statue, which was found at Hawkshaw, Peeblesshire in the late eighteenth century. It dates to the second century CE and may have been looted from a Roman monument further to the south. The Cramond Lioness is a sculpture, probably imported, of a lioness devouring a bound prisoner, found near the Roman base of Cramond Roman Fort near Edinburgh. A relief of the goddess Brigantia found near Birrens in Dumfriesshire, combines elements of native and classical art.

The Newstead Helmet, found at the Roman fort in Newstead, near Melrose in Roxburghshire, is one of the most impressive of many finds of Roman arms and armour. The Staffordshire Moorlands Pan is a second-century Romano-British trulla apparently decorated as a souvenir for a soldier who had served on Hadrian's Wall, and probably made locally. A number of items were also found in the Sculptor's Cave, Coversea in Morayshire, including Roman pottery, rings, bracelets, needles and coins, some of which had been re-used for ornaments.

== See also ==
- Media related to Prehistoric art in Scotland at Wikimedia Commons
