= Sculpture in Scotland =

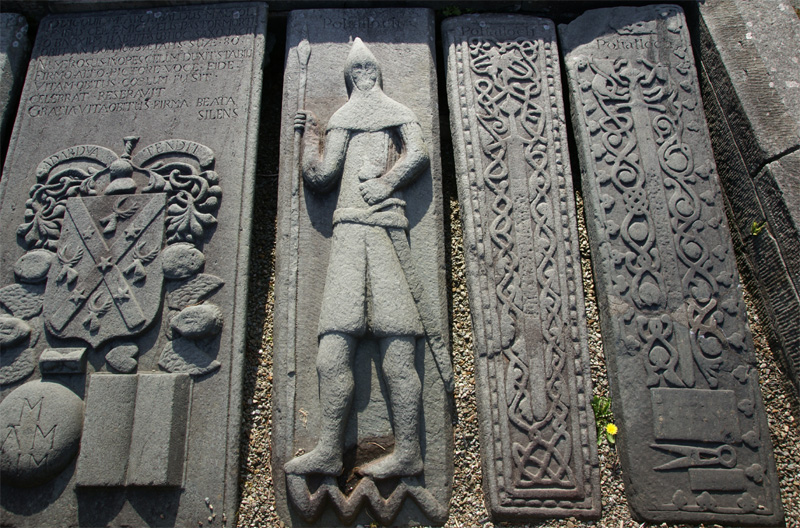
Sculptured stones from Kilmartin Glen

Sculpture in Scotland includes all visual arts operating in three dimensions in the borders of modern Scotland. Durable sculptural processes traditionally include carving (the removal of material) and modelling (the addition of material), in stone, metal, clay, wood and other materials. In the modern era, these were joined by assembly by welding, modelling, moulding and casting. Some installation art can also be considered to be sculpture. The earliest surviving sculptures from Scotland are standing stones and circles from around 3000 BCE. The oldest portable visual art are carved-stone petrospheres, and the Westray Wife is the earliest representation of a human face found in Scotland. From the Bronze Age there are extensive examples of rock art, including cup and ring marks and elaborate carved stone battle-axes. By the early Iron Age, Scotland had been penetrated by the wider European La Tène culture, and a few examples of decoration survive from Scotland. There are also decorated torcs, scabbards, armlets and war trumpets. The Romans began military expeditions into what is now Scotland from about 71 CE, leaving a direct sculptural legacy of distance slabs, altars and other sculptures.

Among the most important survivals of Pictish culture are about 250 carved stones. Class I stones are largely unshaped and include incised animals, everyday objects and abstract symbols. Class II stones are carefully shaped slabs dating after the arrival of Christianity in the eighth and ninth centuries, with a cross on one face and a wide range of symbols on the reverse. Class III stones are elaborately shaped and incised cross-slabs, some with figurative scenes. Items of metalwork have been found throughout Pictland. Dál Riata in the west of Scotland was a cross-roads between the artistic styles of the Picts and those of Ireland. There is evidence for the production of high-status jewellery, hanging bowls and other items that indicate that it was one of the locations where the Insular style was developed, which became common across Great Britain and Ireland. The most significant survivals in sculpture in Insular art are high crosses, large free-standing stone crosses, usually carved in relief with patterns, biblical iconography and occasionally, inscriptions. Viking art avoided naturalism, favouring stylised animal motifs to create its ornamental patterns and later ribbon-interlace and plant motifs became fashionable. In the late Middle Ages, examples of sculpture are extant as part of church architecture and a small number of significant crafted items have also survived. These include highly decorated sacrament houses, carving and monumental effigies. The greatest group of surviving sculptures from this period are from the West Highlands, beginning in the fourteenth century on Iona under the patronage of the Lordship of the Isles. There are also examples of carved chests and chess pieces.

Scotland's ecclesiastical art paid a heavy toll as a result of Reformation iconoclasm, with the almost total loss of medieval religious sculpture. The tradition of stone and wood carving continued in royal palaces, the great houses of the nobility and even the humbler homes of lairds and burgesses. From the seventeenth century, there was elaborate use of carving in carved pediments, fireplaces, heraldic arms and classical motifs. Plasterwork also began to be used, often depicting flowers and cherubs. Many grand tombs for Scottish nobles were situated in Westminster Abbey, rather than in Scottish churches, but there are a few examples as fine as those in England. As in England, sculpture was dominated by foreign professionals. After the Acts of Union in 1707 there was very little patronage for large and expensive works of art in Scotland. The development of the Grand Tour led to the buying of artistic works including sculpture and interest in classical and Renaissance styles and Scots became the major figures in the trade in antique sculpture. With the growth of civic development, there was an increasing demand for public statuary and the portrait bust also became popular. Commissions of new statuary tended to be in relatively cheap lead and even more economical painted or gilded plaster. From the late eighteenth century there are a handful of examples of work from Scottish artists.

While opportunities and training for painters had made advances by the beginning of the nineteenth century, a Scottish tradition of professional sculpture was slower to emerge. There was a movement for the erection of major monuments, representing national sentiments and often focused on national figures. The troubled National Monument of Scotland in Edinburgh remained controversial and failed to gain a consensus on its design. The first significant Scottish sculptor to pursue their career in Scotland was John Steell. This trend reached fruition in the next generation and a recognisable national school was established. Public sculpture was boosted by the centenary of Burns' death in 1896. The late nineteenth century saw the beginnings of the Arts and Crafts movement in Scotland. The major project of the Scottish National War Memorial within Edinburgh Castle, provided opportunities for sculptors, many of whom were drawn from Edinburgh College of Art, helping to cement an Arts and Craft ethos. However, a few artists pursued a more modernist agenda. After the Second World War a new generation of artists emerged, often more directly influenced by modernism. The establishment of the National Gallery of Modern Art in Edinburgh in 1960 provided new possibilities for the display of sculpture. The 1970s saw the emergence of installation and environmental art. In the late twentieth century, new sources of direct government arts funding encouraged greater experimentation. Although the first sculpture park in Scotland was established in 1955, it was in the late 1970s and 1980s that they began to be fully developed. Ideas-based art began to dominate Scottish sculpture from the mid 1980s. A number of women sculptors, public artists and installation artists rose to prominence in what had been a male -dominated area. Particularly significant were artists involved with the Transmission Gallery and Variant magazine in Glasgow. From the 1990s Scottish sculptural arts began to gain international attention.

== Prehistory ==
=== Stone Age ===
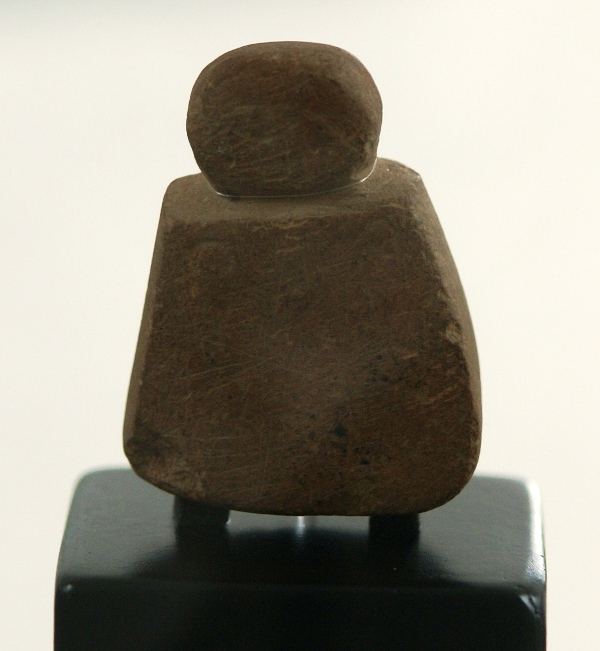
The Westray Wife, probably the oldest surviving representation of a human face from Scotland

Scotland was occupied by Mesolithic hunter-gatherers from around 8500 BCE, who were highly mobile boat-using people making tools from bone, stone and antlers. From about 3000 BCE they introduced the many standing stones and circles such as those at Stenness on the mainland of Orkney, which date from about 3100 BCE. These were part of a pattern that developed in many regions across Europe at about the same time. Probably the oldest examples of portable visual art to survive from Scotland are carved stone balls, or petrospheres, that date from the late Neolithic era. They are a uniquely Scottish phenomenon, with over 425 known examples. Most are from modern Aberdeenshire, but a handful of examples are known from Iona, Skye, Harris, Uist, Lewis, Arran, Hawick, Wigtownshire and fifteen from Orkney, five of which were found at the Neolithic village of Skara Brae. Many functions have been suggested for these objects, most indicating that they were prestigious and powerful possessions. Their production may have continued into the Iron Age. The complex carved circles and spirals on these balls can be seen mirrored in the carving on what was probably a lintel from a chambered cairn at Pierowall on Westray, Orkney, which seem to be part of the same culture that produced carvings at Newgrange in Ireland.

Other items to survive from the period include elaborate carved stone maceheads, often found in burial sites, such as that found at Airdens in Sutherland, which has a pattern of interlocking diamond-shaped facets, similar to those found across Neolithic Britain and Europe. In 2009 the Westray Wife was discovered at the site of a Neolithic village at Links of Noltland near Grobust Bay on the north coast of Westray, a lozenge-shaped figurine that is believed to be the earliest representation of a human face ever found in Scotland. The face has two dots for eyes, heavy brows and an oblong nose and a pattern of hatches on the body could represent clothing. Two more figurines were found at the site in 2010 and 2012.

=== Bronze Age ===
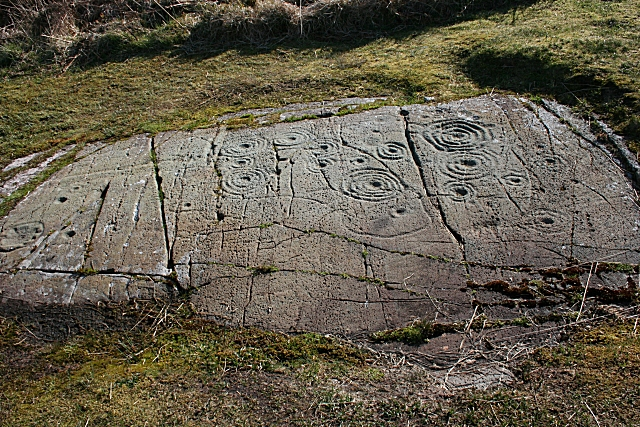
Cup and ring marks at Cairnbaan, Argyll and Bute

The Bronze Age began in Scotland about 2000 BCE as new metallurgical practices reached the region. From this period there are extensive examples of rock art. These include cup and ring marks, a central depression carved into stone, surrounded by rings, sometimes not completed. These are common elsewhere in Atlantic Europe and have been found on natural rocks and isolated stones across Scotland. The most elaborate sets of markings are in western Scotland, particularly in the Kilmartin district. The representations of an axe and a boat at the Ri Cruin Cairn in Kilmartin, and a boat pecked into Wemyss Cave, are probably the oldest two-dimensional representations of real objects that survive in Scotland. Similar carved spirals have also been found on the cover stones of burial cists in Lanarkshire and Catterline. There are also elaborate carved stone battle-axes found in East Lothian, Aberdeenshire and Lanarkshire. These show little sign of use or wear, so may be symbolic representations of power, rather than designed as weapons.

Elaborate metal weaponry includes bronze leaf swords and ceremonial shields of sheet bronze made in Scotland between 900 and 600 BCE. The Migdale Hoard is an early Bronze Age find at Skibo Castle that includes two bronze axes; several pairs of armlets and anklets, a necklace of forty bronze beads, ear pendants and bosses of bronze and jet buttons. There are also a number of smaller items of metalwork from the late Bronze Age found at the Sculptor's Cave, Covesea in Morayshire.

The Ballachulish figure is a life-sized female figure, dating from 700 to 500 BCE, in alder (thought to be oak upon first discovery) with quartz pebbles for eyes, found at Ballachulish, Argyll. It was located in a wickerwork structure in a peat bog which overlooks the entrance to a sea loch, which may have been a place of ritual significance and the figurine may be that of a goddess.

=== Iron Age ===
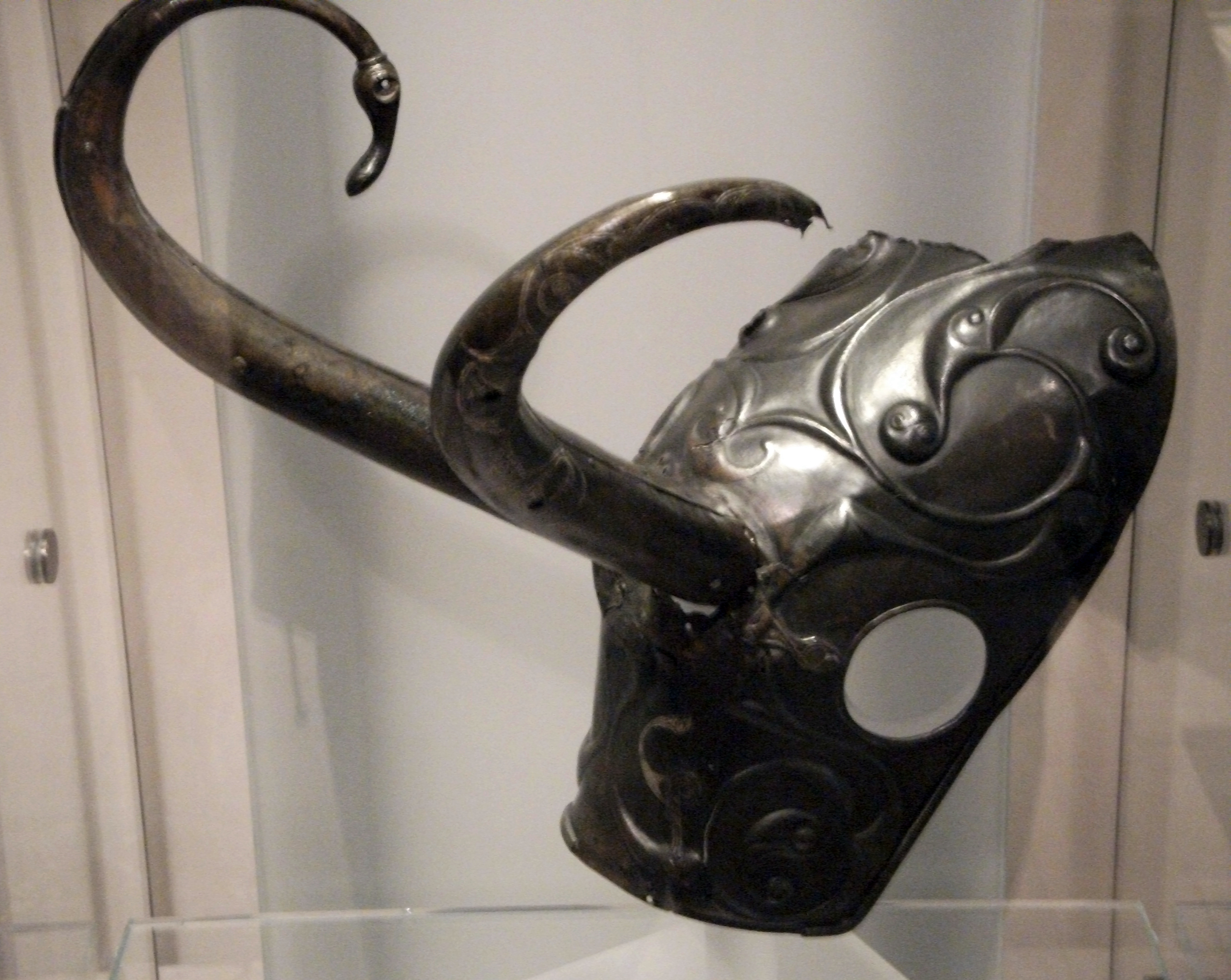
The Torrs Horns and Torrs Pony-cap, as displayed in 2011

By the early Iron Age, from the seventh century BCE, Scotland had been penetrated by the wider European La Tène culture. The Torrs Pony-cap and Horns are perhaps the most impressive of the relatively few finds of La Tène decoration from Scotland, and indicate links with Ireland and southern Britain. The Stirling torcs, found in 2009, are a group of four gold torcs in different styles, dating from 300 BCE and 100 BCE. Two demonstrate common styles found in Scotland and Ireland, but the other two indicate workmanship from what is now southern France, and the Greek and Roman worlds. The bronze Stichill collar is a large engraved necklace, fastened at the back a pin. The Mortonhall scabbard, probably from the first century CE, is elaborately decorated with trumpet curves and "S"-scrolls. Further north there are finds of massive bronze armlets, often with enamelled decoration, such as the ones found at Culbin Sands, Moray. One of the most impressive items from this period is the boar's head fragment of the Deskford carnyx, a war-trumpet from Deskford in Banffshire, probably dating from the first century CE. Similar instruments are mentioned in Roman sources and depicted on the Gundestrup Cauldron found in Denmark. In stone carving there are a number of simple stone heads from Scotland, like that found at Coupar Angus in Perthshire, that may date from the Iron Age. They are similar to those found across Great Britain and Ireland, although they are difficult to date and may have been made much later.

=== Roman influence ===
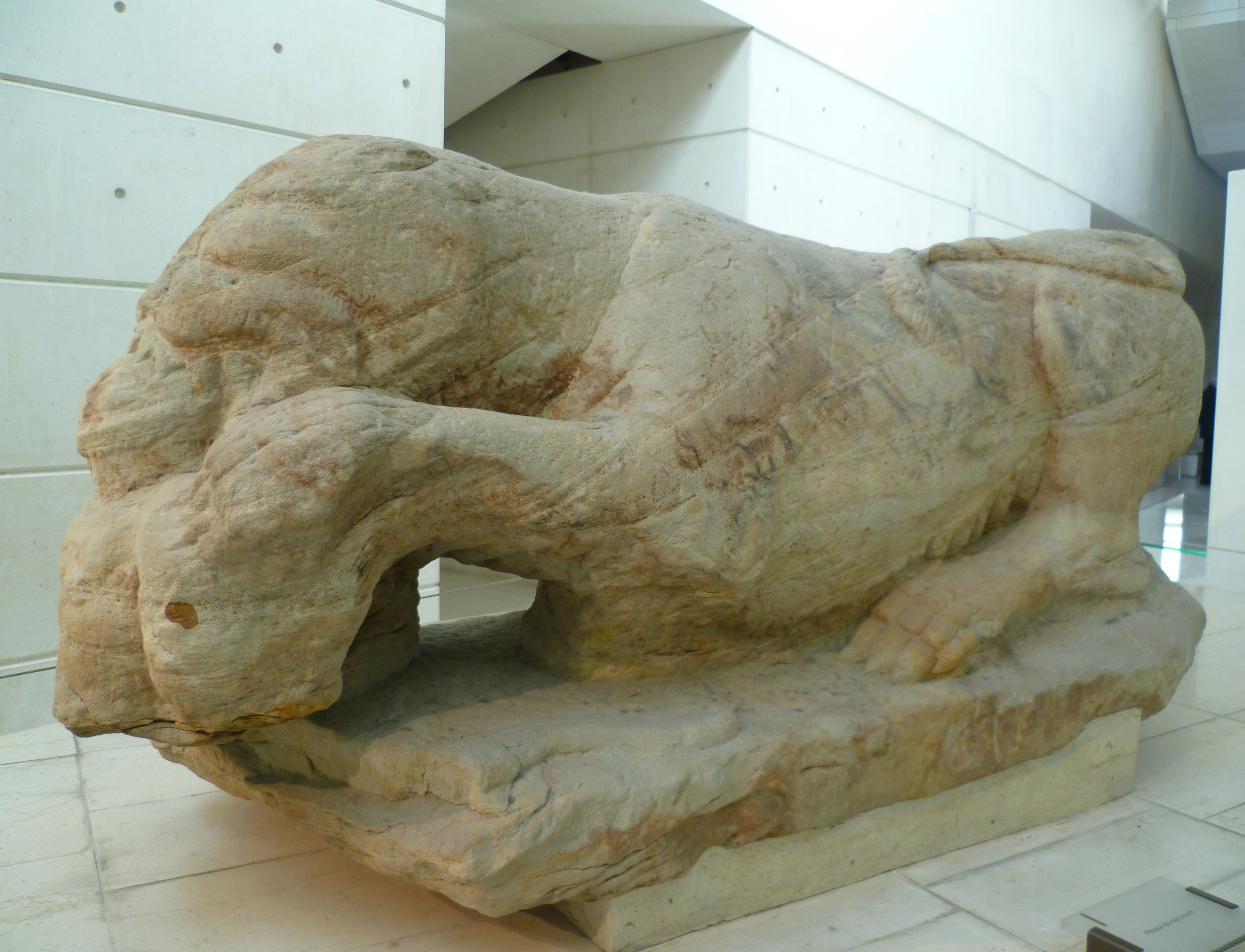
The Cramond Lioness found near the Roman base of Cramond Roman Fort near Edinburgh

The Romans began military expeditions into what is now Scotland from about 71 CE, building a series of forts, but by 87 CE the occupation was limited to the Southern Uplands and by the end of the first century the northern extent of Roman occupation was a line drawn between the Tyne and Solway Firth. The Romans eventually withdrew to a line in what is now northern England, building the fortification known as Hadrian's Wall from coast to coast. Around 141 CE they undertook a reoccupation of southern Scotland, moving up to construct a new limes between the Firth of Forth and the Firth of Clyde, where they built the fortification known as the Antonine Wall. The wall was overrun and abandoned soon after 160 CE and the Romans withdrew back to Hadrian's Wall, which they held until Roman authority collapsed in the early fifth century. The Antonine Wall and its associated forts left a direct sculptural legacy in Scotland. There are 19 distance slabs along the wall that depict graphically the victories and marches of the legions involved in its construction. There are also surviving sculptures, including an altar to Diana and Apollo. There is a fountainhead from a bath-house in the shape of a man's head with a gaping mouth, and the head from a bust or statue, perhaps the goddess Fortuna, both found at Bearsden Roman Fort, East Dunbartonshire, both showing a local Celtic influence. Away from the wall Roman sculptures include the marble head of a Roman emperor or general, broken from a larger statue, which was found at Hawkshaw, Peeblesshire in the late eighteenth century. It dates to the second century CE and may have been looted from a Roman monument further to the south. The Cramond Lioness is a sculpture, probably imported, of a lioness devouring a bound prisoner, found near the Roman base of Cramond Roman Fort near Edinburgh. A relief of the goddess Brigantia found near Birrens in Dumfriesshire, combines elements of native and classical art.

== Medieval ==
=== Picts ===
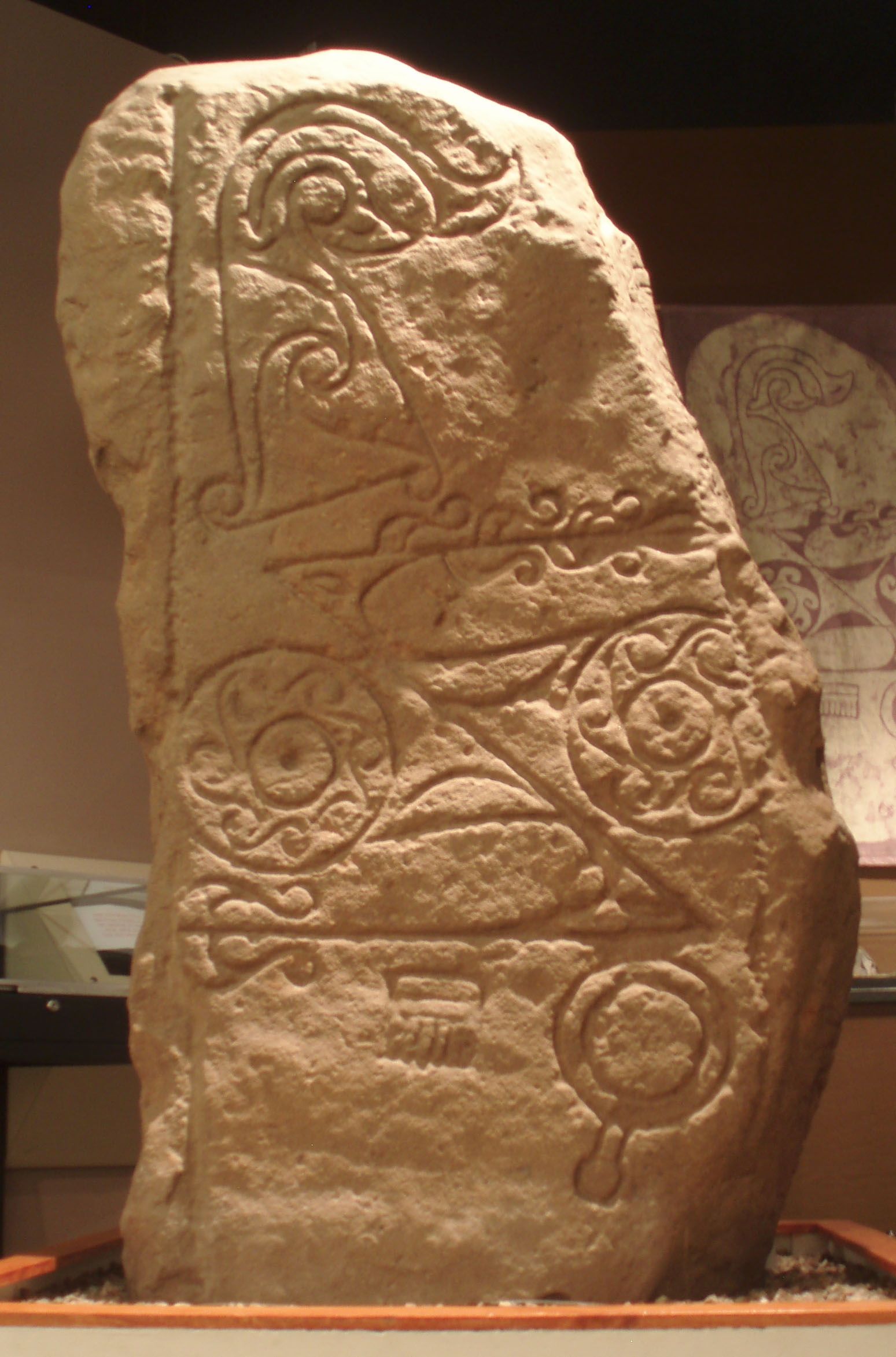
The Dunnichen Stone, a Class I incised stone, with double disc and z-rod, mirror and comb and flower Pictish symbols

The Picts were a large tribal confederation of Celtic peoples during the Late Iron Age and Early Medieval periods living in what is now eastern and northern Scotland. Among the most important survivals of Pictish culture are about 250 carved stones. They have been assigned by scholars to three classes. Class I stones are those thought to date to the period up to the seventh century and are the most numerous group. The stones are largely unshaped and include incised symbols of animals such as fish and the Pictish beast, everyday objects such as mirrors, combs and tuning forks and abstract symbols defined by names including v-rod, double disc and z-rod. They are found between from the Firth of Forth to Shetland. The greatest concentrations are in Sutherland, around modern Inverness and Aberdeen. Examples include the Dunrobin (Sutherland) and Aberlemno stones (Angus).

Class II stones are carefully shaped slabs dating after the arrival of Christianity in the eighth and ninth centuries, with a cross on one face and a wide range of symbols on the reverse. In smaller numbers than Class I stones, they predominate in southern Pictland, in Perth, Angus and Fife. Examples include Glamis 2, which contains a finely executed Celtic cross on the main face with two opposing male figures, a centaur, cauldron, deer head and a triple disc symbol and Cossans, Angus, which shows a high-prowed Pictish boat with oarsmen and a figure facing forward in the prow. Class III stones are thought to overlap chronologically with Class II stones. Most are elaborately shaped and incised cross-slabs, some with figurative scenes, but lacking idiomatic Pictish symbols. They are widely distributed but predominate in the southern Pictish areas. Pictish symbols are also found elsewhere, including in the entrance to the Sculptor's Cave, to which they give its name, including the fish, crescent & v-rod, pentacle, triple vesica, step, mirror-case and rectangular symbols.

Items of metalwork have been found throughout Pictland. The earlier Picts appear to have had a considerable amount of silver available, probably from raiding further south, or the payment of subsidies to keep them from doing so. The very large hoard of late Roman hacksilver found at Traprain Law may have originated in either way. The largest hoard of early Pictish metalwork was found in 1819 at Norrie's Law in Fife, but unfortunately much was dispersed and melted down. Over ten heavy silver chains, some over 1.6 feet (0.49 m) long, have been found from this period; the double-linked Whitecleuch Chain is one of only two that have a penannular ring, with symbol decoration including enamel, which shows how these were probably used as "choker" necklaces. The St Ninian's Isle Treasure of 28 silver and silver-gilt objects, contains perhaps the best collection of late Pictish forms, from the Christian period, when Pictish metalwork style, as with stone-carving, gradually merged with Insular, Anglo-Saxon and Viking styles.

=== Irish-Scots ===
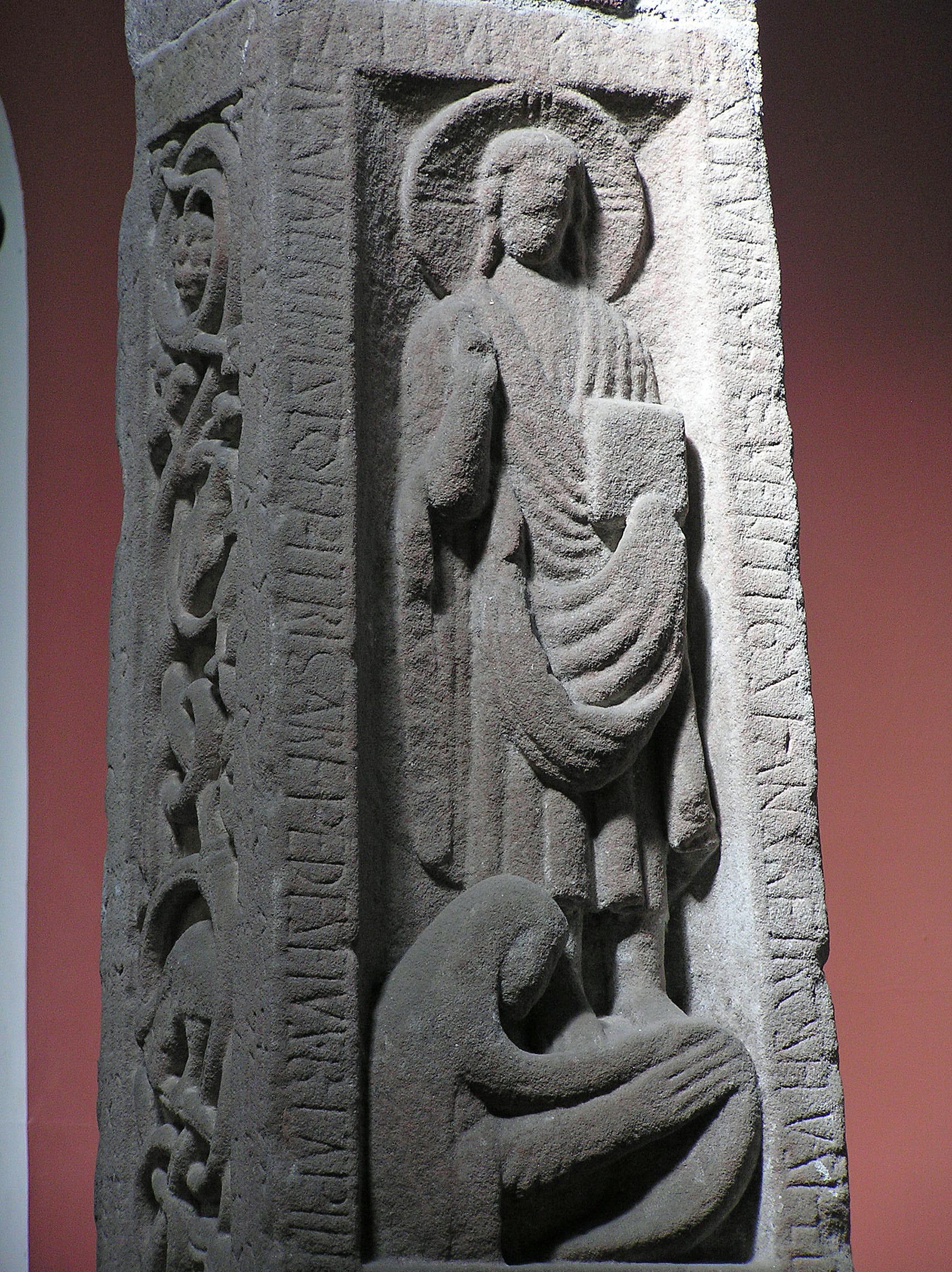
The Ruthwell Cross, showing the washing of Christ's feet

Thomas Charles-Edwards has suggested that the kingdom of Dál Riata in the west of Scotland was a cross-roads between the artistic styles of the Picts and those of Ireland, with which the Scots settlers in what is now Argyll kept close contacts. This can be seen in representations found in excavations of the fortress of Dunadd, which combine Pictish and Irish elements. This included extensive evidence for the production of high status jewellery and moulds from the seventh century that indicate the production of pieces similar to the Hunterston brooch, found in Ayrshire, which may have been made in Dál Riata, but with elements that suggest Irish origins. These and other finds, including a trumpet spiral decorated hanging bowl disc and a stamped animal decoration (or pressblech), perhaps from a bucket or drinking horn, indicate the ways in which Dál Riata was one of the locations where the Insular style was developed. In the eighth and ninth centuries the Pictish elite adopted true penannular brooches with lobed terminals from Ireland. Some older Irish pseudo-penannular brooches were adapted to the Pictish style, for example the Breadalbane Brooch (British Museum). The eighth century Monymusk Reliquary, said to contain the remains of St. Columba, has elements of Pictish and Irish styles.

=== Anglo-Saxon and Insular styles ===
From the sixth century the Anglo-Saxon kingdom of Bernicia, part of Northumbria, stretched into what is now Lowland Scotland. Early examples of Anglo-Saxon art from the region include exceptional items such as the intricately carved whalebone Franks Casket form the early eighth century, which combines pagan, classical and Christian motifs. After the Christianisation of Britain from the seventh century, artistic styles in Northumbria interacted with those in Ireland and what is now Scotland to become part of the common style historians have identified as Insular or Hiberno-Saxon.

The most significant survivals in sculpture in Insular art are in high crosses. These are large free-standing stone crosses, usually carved in relief with patterns, biblical iconography and occasionally inscriptions. The tradition may have begun in Ireland or Anglo-Saxon England and then spread to Scotland. They are found throughout the British Isles and often feature a stone ring around the intersection, forming a Celtic cross, apparently an innovation of Celtic Christianity, that may have begun at Iona. Distribution in Scotland is heaviest in the Highlands and Islands and they can be dated to the period c. 750 to 1150. All the surviving crosses are of stone, but there are indications that large numbers of wooden crosses may also have existed. In Scotland biblical iconography is less common than in Ireland, but the subject of King David is relatively frequently depicted. In the east the influence of Pictish sculpture can be seen. Important examples dated to the eighth century include St Martin's Cross on Iona, the Kildalton Cross from the Hebrides and the Anglo-Saxon Ruthwell Cross. Through the Hiberno-Scottish mission to the continent, insular art was highly influential on subsequent European Medieval art, especially the decorative elements of Romanesque and Gothic styles.

=== Viking age ===
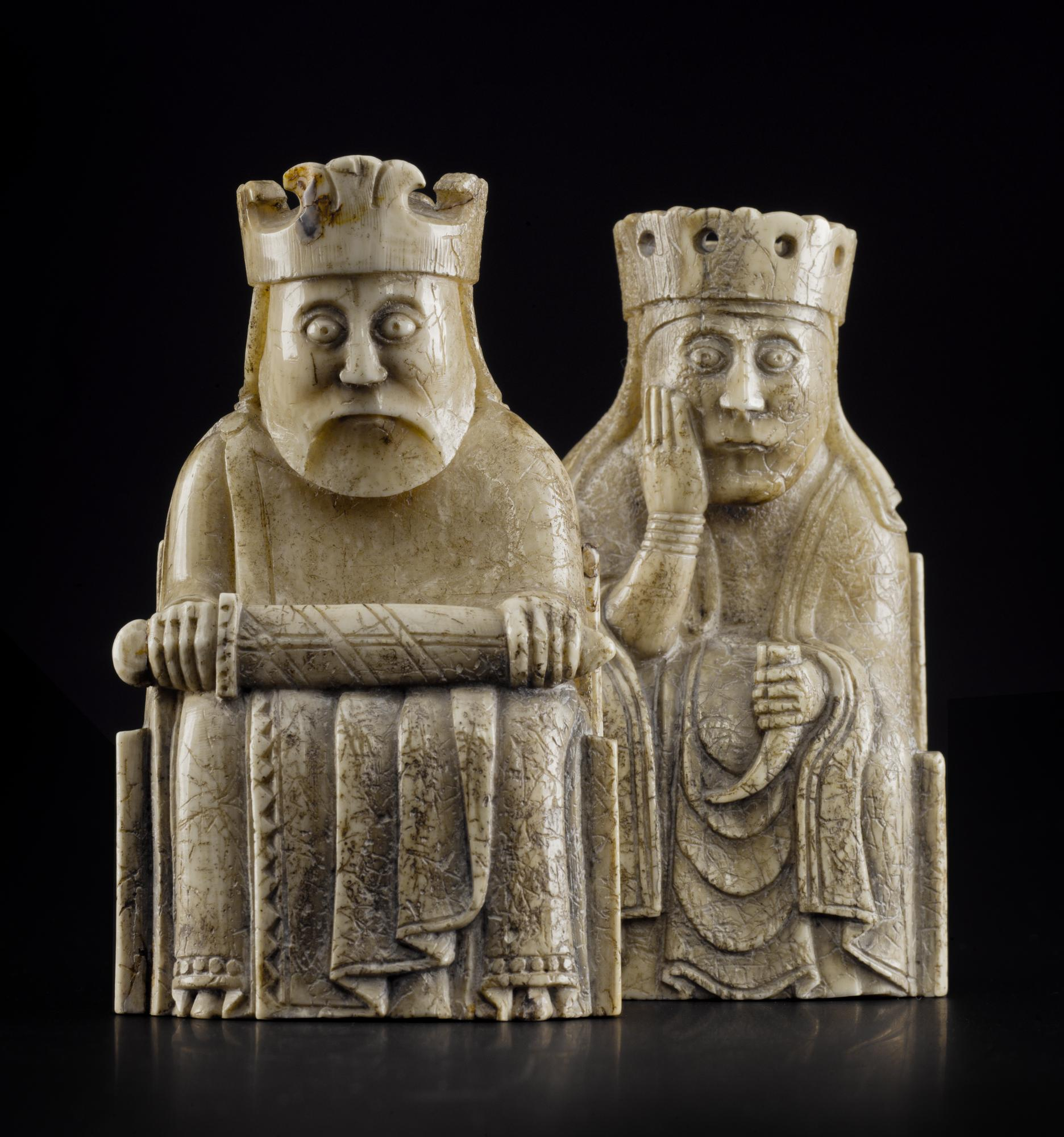
Some of the Lewis chessmen

From the eighth century Scandinavian invaders took territories in the North and West of Scotland, included the Northern Isles of Orkney and Shetland, the Hebrides and parts of the mainland. Viking art avoided naturalism, favouring stylised animal motifs to create its ornamental patterns. Ribbon-interlace was important and plant motifs became fashionable in the tenth and eleventh centuries. Most Scottish artefacts come from 130 "pagan" burials in the north and west from the mid-ninth to the mid-tenth centuries. These include jewellery, weapons and occasional elaborate high status items. Amongst the most impressive of these is the Scar boat burial, on Orkney, which contained an elaborate sword, quiver with arrows, a brooch, bone comb, gaming pieces and the Scar Dragon Plaque, made from whalebone, most of which were probably made in Scandinavia. From the west, another boat burial at Kiloron Bay in Colonsay revealed a sword, shield, iron cauldron and enamelled scales, which may be Celtic in origin. A combination of Viking and Celtic styles can be seen in a penannular brooch from Pierowall in Orkney, which has a Pictish-style looped pin. It is about two inches in diameter, with traces of gilding, and probably housed a piece of amber surrounded by interweaving ribbons. After the conversion to Christianity, from the tenth to the twelfth centuries, stone crosses and cross-slabs in Viking occupied areas of the Highlands and Islands were carved with successive styles of Viking ornament. They were frequently mixed with native interlace and animal patterns. Examples include the eleventh-century cross-slab from Dóid Mhàiri on the island of Islay, where the plant motifs on either side of the cross-shaft are based upon the Ringerike style of Viking art. The most famous artistic find from modern Scotland, the Lewis Chessmen, from Uig, were probably made in Trondheim in Norway, but contain some decoration that may have been influenced by Celtic patterns.

=== Late Middle Ages ===
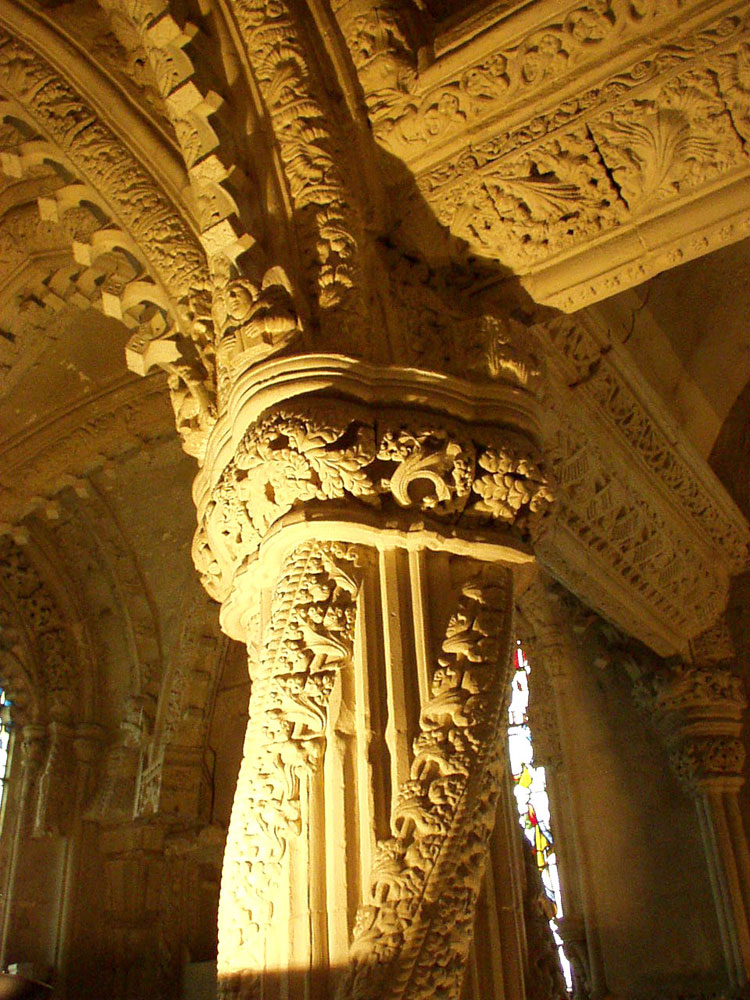
The Apprentice Pillar from Roslyn Chapel

Architectural evidence suggests that, while the Romanesque style peaked in much of Europe in the later eleventh century and early twelfth century, it was still reaching Scotland in the second half of the twelfth century and was revived in the late fifteenth century, perhaps as a reaction to the English perpendicular style that had come to dominate. Much of the best Scottish artwork of the High and Late Middle Ages was either religious in nature or realised in metal and woodwork and has not survived the impact of time and the Reformation. However, examples of sculpture are extant as part of church architecture and a small number of significant crafted items have survived.

The interiors of churches were often more elaborate before the Reformation, with highly decorated sacrament houses, such as the ones surviving at Deskford and Kinkell. The carvings at Rosslyn Chapel, created in the mid-fifteenth century, elaborately depicting the progression of the seven deadly sins, are considered some of the finest in the Gothic style. Monumental effigies began to appear in churches from the thirteenth century and they were usually fully coloured and gilded. Many were founders and patrons of churches and chapels, including members of the clergy, knights and often their wives. In contrast to England, where the fashion for stone-carved monuments gave way to brass etchings, they continued to be produced until the end of the Medieval period, with the largest group dating from the fifteenth century, including the elaborate Douglas tombs in the town of Douglas. Sometimes the best continental artists were employed, as for Robert I's elaborate tomb in Dunfermline Abbey, which was made in his lifetime by the Parisian sculptor Thomas of Chartres, but of which only fragments now survive. The greatest group of surviving sculptures from this period are from the West Highlands, beginning in the fourteenth century on Iona under the patronage of the Lordship of the Isles and continuing until the Reformation. Common motifs were ships, swords, harps and Romanesque vine leaf tracery with Celtic elements. Surviving wood carving can be seen at King's College, Aberdeen and Dunblane Cathedral.

Two secular small chests with carved whalebone panels and metal fittings illustrate some aspects of the Scottish arts. The Eglington and Fife Caskets are very similar and were probably made by the same workshop around 1500, as boxes for valuables such as jewellery or documents. The overall form of the caskets follows French examples, and the locks and metal bands are decorated in Gothic style with "simple decorations of fleurons and debased egg and dart" while the whalebone panels are carved in relief with a late form of Insular interwoven strapwork characteristic of late Medieval West Scotland. The Skye Chess piece is a single elaborate piece in carved walrus ivory, with two warriors carrying heraldic shields in a framework of openwork vegetation. It is thought to be Scottish, of the mid-thirteenth century, with aspects similar to both English and Norwegian pieces.

== Early modern era ==
=== Sixteenth century ===
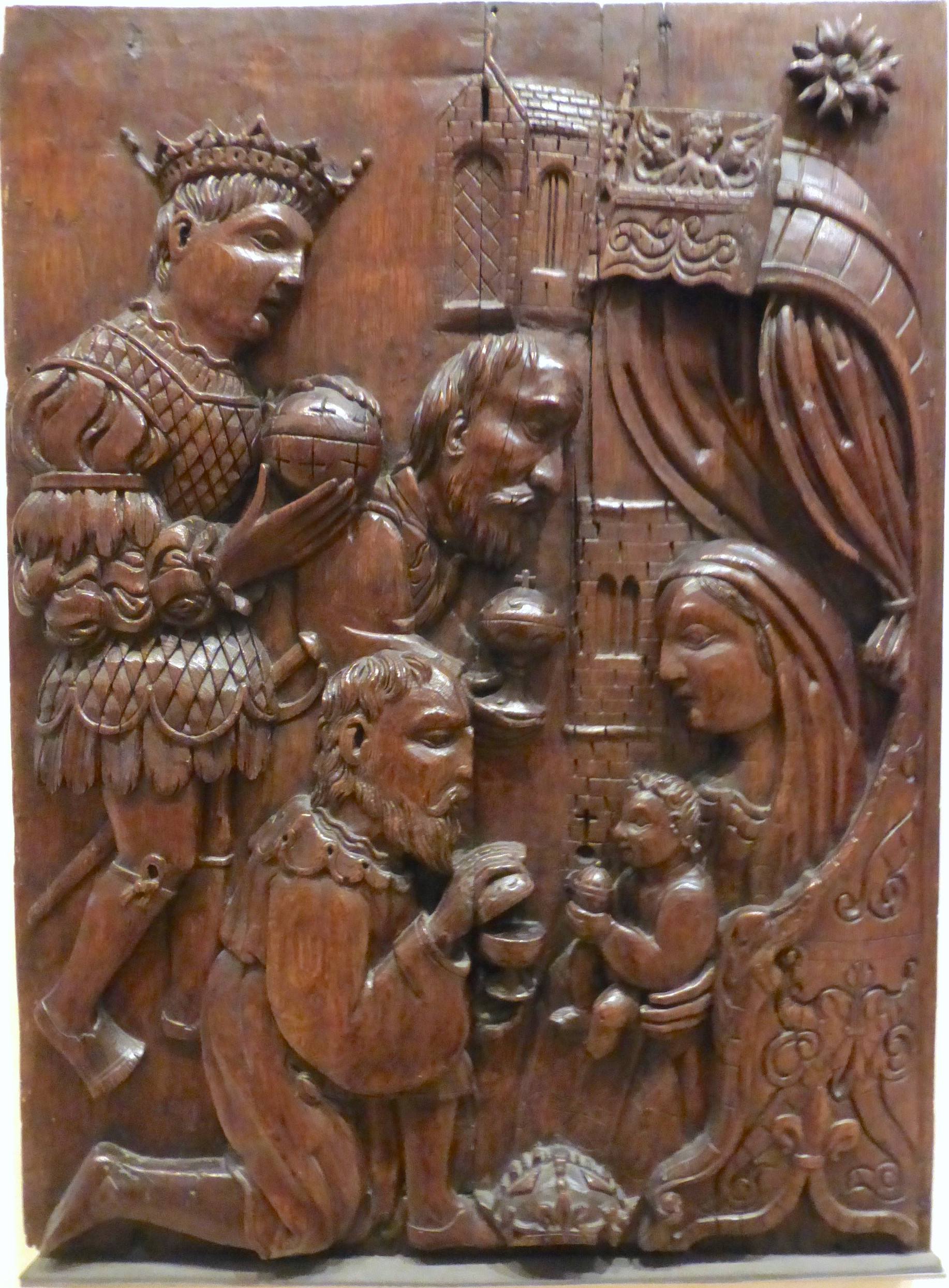
Mid-16th century oak panel carving from a house in Dundee

Scotland's ecclesiastical art paid a heavy toll as a result of Reformation iconoclasm, with the almost total loss of medieval religious sculpture. In the West Highlands, where there had been a hereditary caste of monumental sculptors, the uncertainty and loss of patronage caused by the rejection of monuments in the Reformation meant that they moved into another branches of the Gaelic learned orders or took up other occupations. The lack of transfer of carving skills is noticeable in the decline in quality when gravestones were next commissioned from the start of the seventeenth century. According to N. Prior, the nature of the Scottish Reformation may have had wider effects, limiting the creation of a culture of public display and meaning that art was channelled into more austere forms of expression with an emphasis on private and domestic restraint.

Although tradition of stone and wood carving in churches largely ended at the Reformation, it continued in royal palaces, the great houses of the nobility and even the humbler homes of lairds and burgesses. The intricate lid of the fourteenth-century Bute mazer, carved from a single piece of whale bone, was probably created in the early sixteenth century. There are also the elaborately engraved Cadboll cup and the Galloway mazer, which both date from the mid-sixteenth century. At Stirling Castle, stone carvings on the royal palace from the reign of James V are taken from German patterns, and, such as the surviving carved oak portrait roundels from the King's Presence Chamber, known as the Stirling Heads, they include contemporary, biblical and classical figures. These, and the elaborate Renaissance fountain at Linlithgow Palace (c. 1538.), suggest that there was a workshop with an established connected with the court in the early sixteenth century. A French wood carver Andrew Mansioun worked for the court and joined the Edinburgh craft incorporation, training apprentices. Some of the finest domestic wood carving is in the Beaton panels, may have been made for Cardinal Beaton's private apartments in St Andrews Castle and later installed in the dining room of Balfour House in Fife.

=== Seventeenth century ===
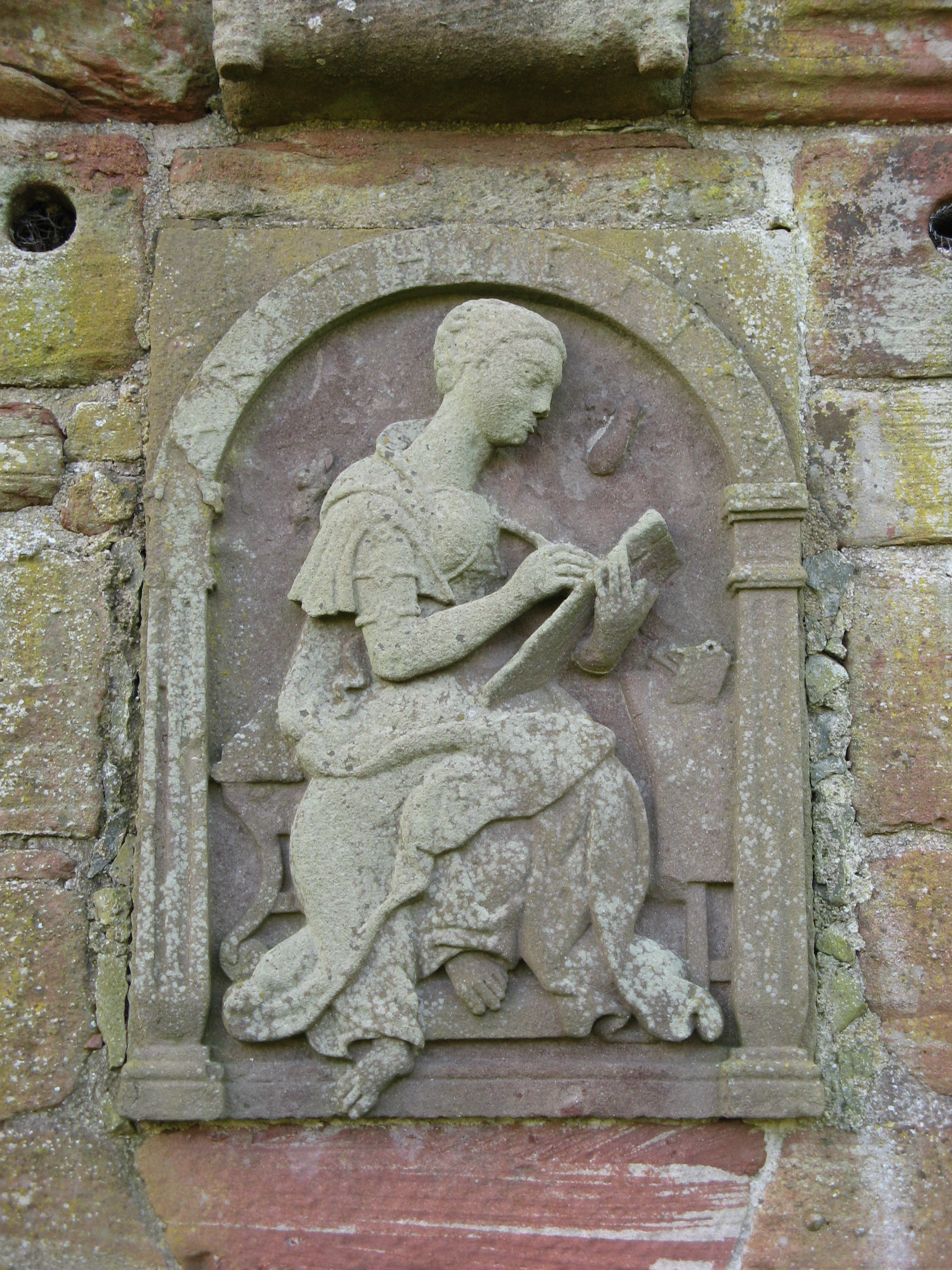
Arithmetica from the garden of Edzell Castle

From the seventeenth century, as domestic architecture for the nobility was increasingly for comfort, rather than fortification, there was elaborate use of carving in carved pediments, fireplaces, heraldic arms and classical motifs. Plasterwork also began to be used, often depicting flowers and cherubs. Richly carved decoration on ordinary houses was common in the period. There is also the heraldic carving, such as the royal arms at Holyrood Palace, designed by the Dutch painter Jacob de Wet in 1677. Elaborate carving was used at Huntly Castle, rebuilt for George Gordon, 1st Marquess of Huntly (1562–1636) in the early seventeenth century, in wooden panels that focused on heraldic images. Their "popish" overtones led to them being damaged by an occupying Covenanter army in 1640. The tradition of carving also survived in work such as the carved stone panels in the garden of Edzell Castle (c. 1600), where there are depictions of seven Cardinal Virtues, the seven Liberal Arts and the seven Planetary Deities; the now lost carving done for Edinburgh and Glasgow universities and in the many elaborate sundials of the seventeenth century, such as those at Newbattle Abbey.

Many grand tombs for Scottish nobles were situated in Westminster Abbey, rather than in Scottish churches. Exceptions include the two tombs designed by the Flemish-born Maximilian Colt (d. post 1641), the leading sculptor at the English Jacobean court, for George Home, 1st Earl of Dunbar in Dunbar parish church (c. 1611) and David Murray, 1st Viscount of Stormont in the Palace Chapel at Scone (c. 1618). Both have a kneeling figure derived from Tudor iconography. From the late part of the century there is the monument to the murdered James Sharp (1618–79), Archbishop of St. Andrews, in Holy Trinity Church, St. Andrews. Probably carved in the Netherlands, the grandiose tomb shows the Archbishop in prayer above a carved tableaux of his martyrdom, flanked by Corinthian columns. There are also the baroque tombs to James Douglas, 2nd Duke of Queensberry at Durisdeer, Dumfriesshire, and the William Douglas, 3rd Duke of Hamilton in St. Bride's Bothwell, Lanarkshire (both designed c. 1695), which are as grand as any contemporaneous monument in England.

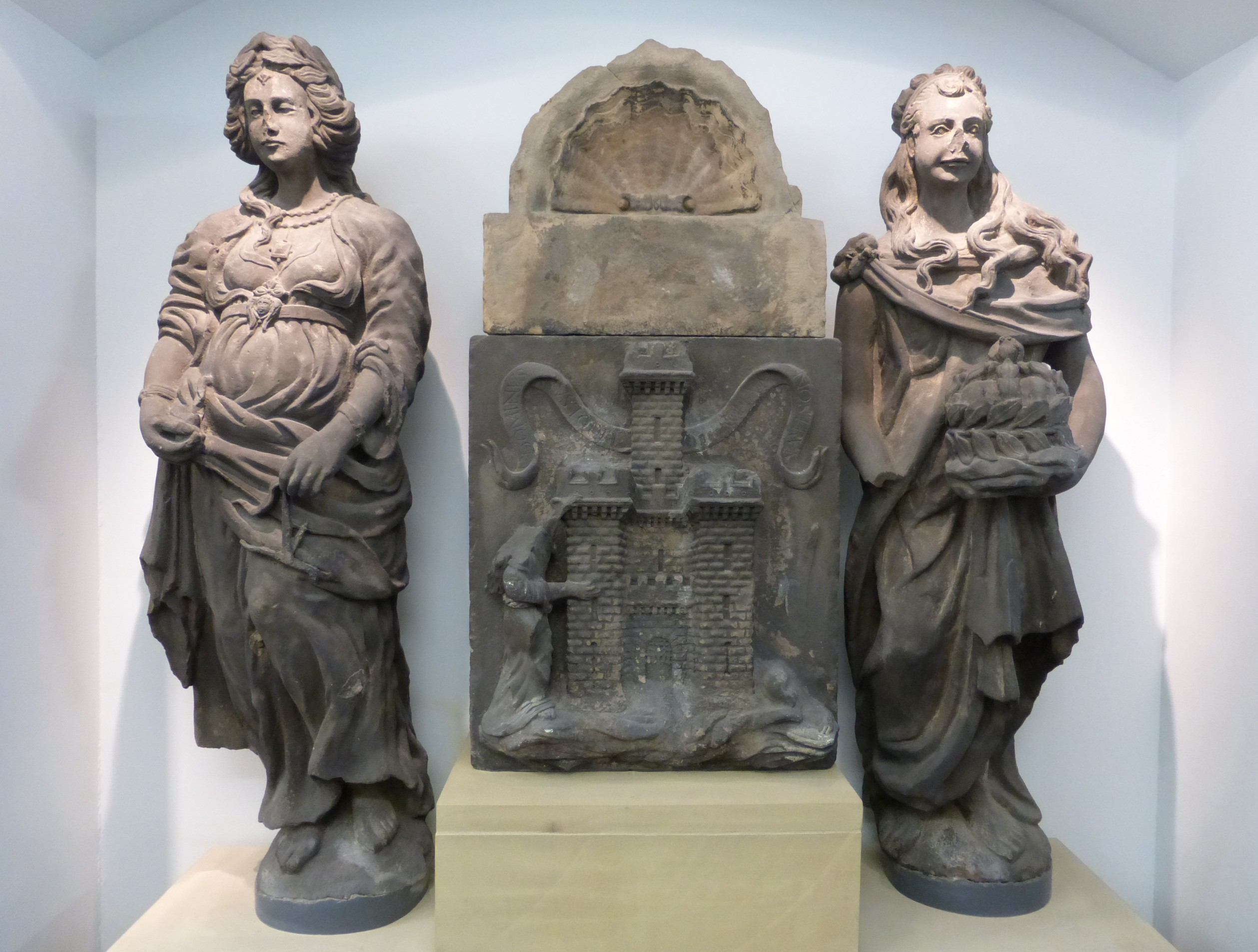
Justice and Mercy, carved by Alexander Mylne for Parliament House

Members of the Mylne family dominated royal building and masonry in Scotland in the first half of the seventeenth century. John Mylne (c. 1589–1657) completed a statue of James VI begun by Benjamin Lambert after the latter's death in 1616 and his most famous work was the sundial in Holyrood (1633). Alexander Mylne (d. 1643) was primarily a sculptor and in 1635 executed the royal arms over the entrance of Parliament House and two years later the two figures of Justice and Mercy on the same building.

As in England, in the late seventeenth century sculpture was dominated by foreign professionals. Dutch-born Grinling Gibbons (1648–1721) supplied four large lead statues to Glamis Castle and in 1701 he supplied seven chimney pieces to Dalkeith House, including one in red and white marble bearing the story of Neptune and Galatea. The equestrian statue of Charles II outside Parliament House (1684/5) was a lead replica of Gibbon's bronze statue at Windsor, the first in Britain to depict a monarch in classical dress. John Van Ost (fl. 1680–1729) supplied lead garden statuary for Hopetoun House and Drumlanrig Castle. Sir William Bruce (c. 1630–1710), the leading Scottish architect of the seventeenth century, favoured Dutch carvers for his realisation of Kinross House in Fife, where there are festoons, trophies and cornucopia around the doorways and gates. This may have included Jan van Sant Voort, a Dutch carver known to have been living in Leith, who supplied Bruce with a carved heraldic overdoor in 1679 and who worked on Bruce's rebuilding of Holyrood Palace. From 1674 the London plasterers George Dunsterfield (fl. 1660–76) and John Houlbert (fl. 1674–79) worked for Bruce at Thirlestane, Berwickshire and at Holyroodhouse. Dunsterfield was also active at Balcaskie, Fife and probably at Kellie Castle, Fife.

== Modern era ==
=== Eighteenth century ===
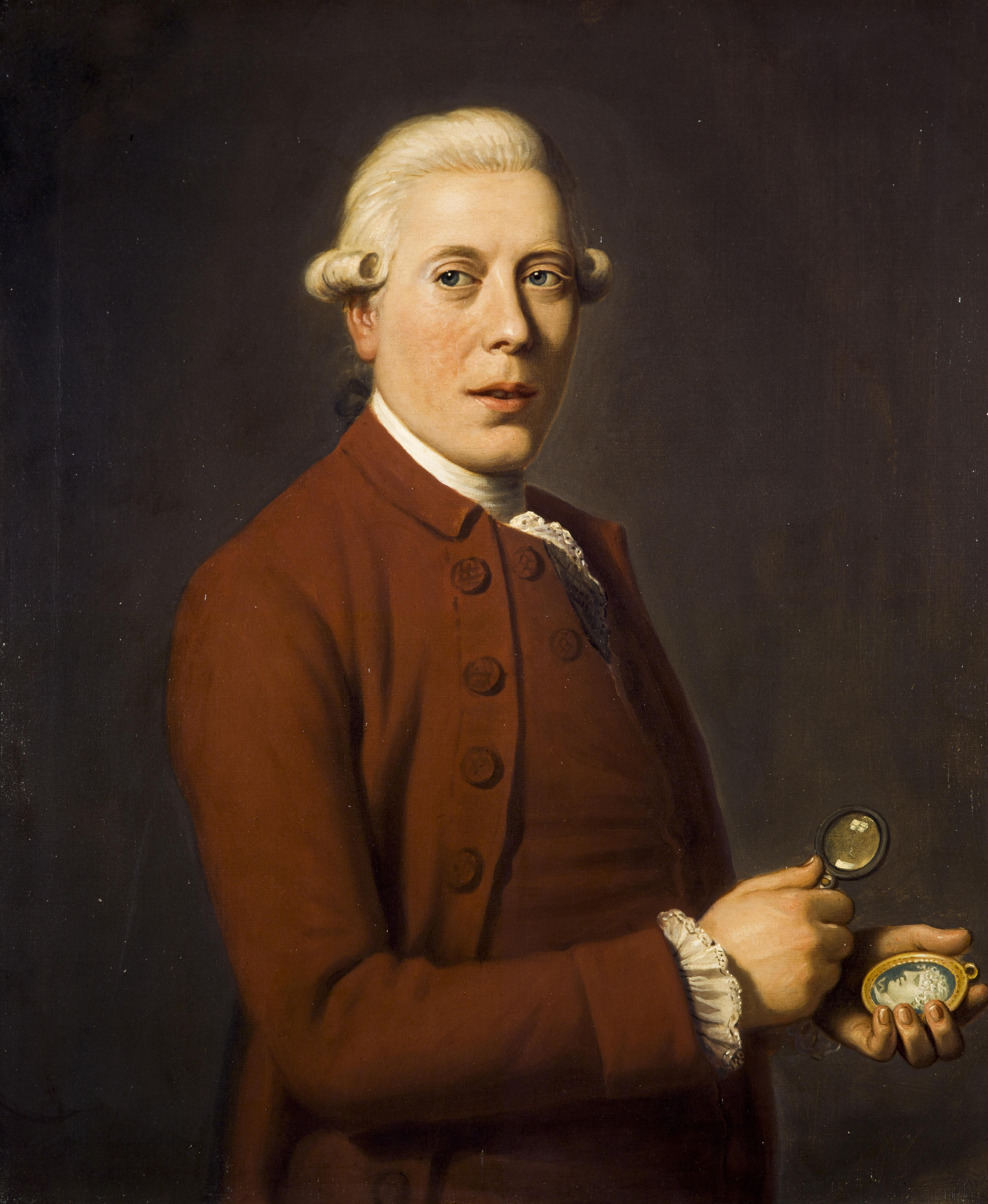
Portrait of James Tassie by David Allan, c. 1781

After the Acts of Union in 1707 there was very little patronage for large and expensive works of art in Scotland. The royal family spent very little time in, or money on, Scottish palaces and many Scottish nobles followed the royal court to England, tending to invest in sculpture for their residences in London, rather than their estates in Scotland. In the late eighteenth century the development of the Grand Tour took young Scottish aristocrats to the continent, particularly Rome, which was home to the exiled Jacobite Stuarts, and led to the buying of artistic works including sculpture and interest in classical and Renaissance styles. In the second half of the century Scots became the major figures in the trade in antique sculpture, particularly Gavin Hamilton (1723–98), Colin Morison (1732–1801) and James Byres (1734–1817), making them the arbiters of British taste in this area. However, the only major Scottish collection of marble before the nineteenth century was that of James Johnstone, 2nd Marquess of Annandale.

With the growth of civic development there was an increasing demand for public statuary, often with the patronage of a public institution, such as the lead figure of George II at the newly founded Royal Infirmary, Edinburgh in 1753 or the figure of the judge Duncan Forbes for the Outer Parliament House in 1752. The portrait bust, designed for interior display, also became popular. By the middle of the century were being preferred to painted portraits among the aristocracy. As in England, commissions of new statuary tended to in relatively cheap lead and even more economical painted or gilded plaster. The plasterwork of John Cheere's yard in London was particularly in demand. Also important was the work from the yard of John Bacon (1740–99) who produced a monument for Robert Dundas (d. 1787) at Borthwick Church and one for Mrs Allardyce (d. 1787) at West Church, Aberdeen. Bacon was also a partner in Mrs Eleanor Coade's Artificial Stone Manufactory at Lambeth in London. This produced a buff coloured ceramic that could be moulded to provide fine detail, and be fired in sections, but was impervious to frost and fire. Much cheaper than carved stone, Coadstone was used for sphinxes, balustrading, capitals, coat of arms, tablets, ornamental vases, church monuments and fonts. It was used extensively by the Adam brothers, particularly in the houses they built in Scotland, such as Cullen, Banff, Culzean Castle, Ayrshire, Dunbar Castle, East Lothian, Register House, Edinburgh, Gosford House, East Lothian and Wedderburn, Berwickshire. As well as supplying sculpture, candelabra and cippi, the Adam family supplied designs to the Carron Company, founded in 1759, which produced a wide range of iron products, including stoves, safes, vases and tablets.

From the late eighteenth century there are a handful of examples of work from Scottish artists. These included statues of druids on the portico of Penicuik House carved by one "Willie Jeans" in 1776; the marble bust of James Gillespie by the obscure Robert Burn (fl. 1790–1816) and the bronze figure in Roman armour at the City Chambers, Edinburgh, which may represent Charles Edward Stuart or Louis XV. James Tassie (1735–99) was born in Glasgow and trained as a stonemason. He attended the Foulis Academy, founded in Glasgow in 1754 by the printmaking brothers Robert and Andrew Foulis, before moving to Dublin and then London. He developed a formula for making casts in vitreous paste and manufactured casts of antique carved gems. He also produced portrait medallions and among his sitters were many leading figures in Scottish intellectual life, such as Adam Smith, David Hume and Henry Raeburn. His medallions were popular when produced in Wedgwood jasper and were used by the Carron Company to be cast in iron.

=== Nineteenth century ===
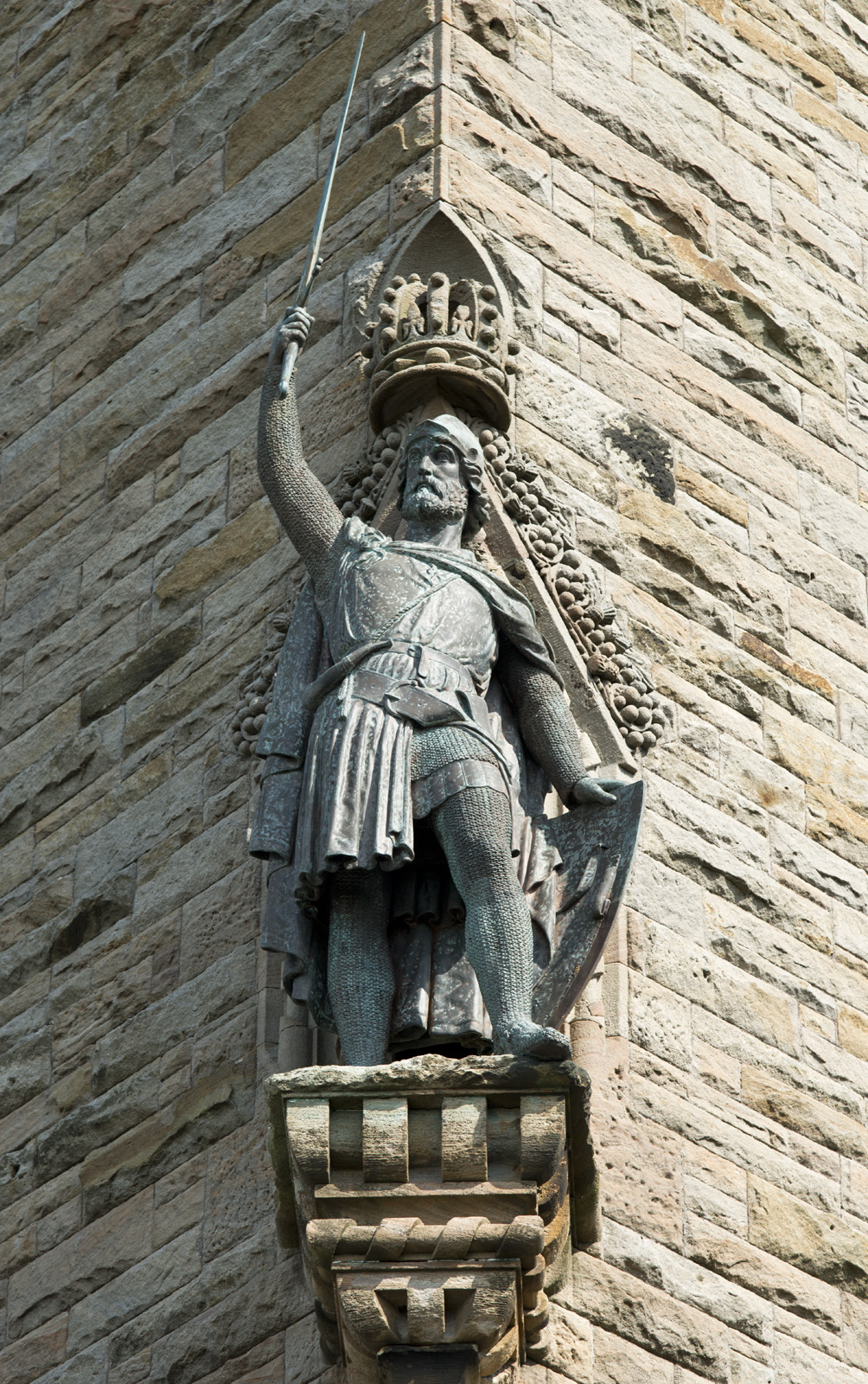
David Watson Stevenson's statue of William Wallace on the exterior of the Wallace Monument

While opportunities and training for painters had made advances by the beginning of the nineteenth century, a Scottish tradition of professional sculpture was slower to emerge. In the early decades of the century commissions continued to be given to English artists, including Samuel Joseph (1791–1850), who was working in Edinburgh in 1821–29 and was a founding member of the Scottish Academy. Thomas Campbell (c. 1790–1858) studied in London and settled in Rome, where he received commissions from visiting British subjects before returning to London in 1830. His works in Scotland included the Hopetoun Memorial (1824–34) in Edinburgh. Lawrence Macdonald (1799–1878) was able to study at the Trustees Academy in Edinburgh and then Rome. He returned to Edinburgh from 1827, but moved back to Rome in 1832, where he worked for the rest of his life. His most significant works included his busts of General David Baird and of the phrenologist George Combe (c. 1830).

There was a movement for the erection of major monuments, representing national sentiments and often focused on national figures. The troubled National Monument of Scotland in Edinburgh, proposed in 1816 to commemorate the Scottish dead of the Napoleonic Wars, was envisioned as a pillar, arch, church and eventually was modelled on the Parthenon in Athens by Charles Robert Cockerell and William Henry Playfair and moved sites from the Mound to Calton Hill, where the foundation stone was laid in 1822. It remained controversial and failed to gain a consensus on its design. The Scott Monument in Princes Street Gardens (1840–48) in Edinburgh was an elaborate structure built in the Gothic style, designed by carpenter and self-taught architect George Meikle Kemp. The Wallace Monument, paid for by public subscription and built from 1861 to 1869, is a 166 feet (51 m) tower overlooking the site of the Battle of Stirling Bridge.

The first significant Scottish sculptor to pursue their career in Scotland was John Steell (1804–91). He trained at the Trustee's Academy and in Rome and was elected to the Scottish Academy in 1830 while still in his twenties. The first work of his to gain significant public attention was Alexander and Bucephasus. His 1832 design for a statue of Sir Walter Scott was incorporated into the author's memorial in Edinburgh. It marked the beginnings of a national school of sculpture based around major figures from Scottish culture and Scottish and British history. He was created the first Sculptor in Ordinary for Scotland by Queen Victoria.

The tradition of Scottish sculpture was taken forward by artists such as Patrick Park (1811–55), Alexander Handyside Ritchie (1804–70) and William Calder Marshall (1813–94). This reached fruition in the next generation of sculptors including William Brodie (1815–81), Amelia Hill (1820–1904) and Steell's apprentice David Watson Stevenson (1842–1904). Stevenson contributed the statue of William Wallace on the exterior of the Wallace Monument and many of the busts in the gallery of heroes inside, which included Robert the Bruce, John Knox, Walter Scott, Robert Burns, James Watt and Thomas Carlyle. Public sculpture was boosted by the centenary of Burns' death in 1896. Stevenson produced a statue of the poet in Leith. Hill produced one for Dumfries. John Steell produced a statue for Central Park in New York, versions of which were made for Dundee, London and Dunedin. Statues of Burns and Scott were produced in areas of Scottish settlement, particularly in North America and Australia and in Montreal.

The late nineteenth century saw the beginnings of the Arts and Crafts movement in Scotland, influenced by William Morris, Ford Madox Brown and John Ruskin. It began with the stained glass revival of the 1850s, pioneered by James Ballantine (1808–77). It also influenced the Glasgow-born designer and theorist Christopher Dresser (1834–1904) was one of the first, and most important, independent designers, a pivotal figure in the Aesthetic Movement and a major contributor to the allied Anglo-Japanese movement. He produced carpets, ceramics, furniture, glass, graphics, metalwork, including silver and electroplate, including his angular teapot of 1879.

=== Early twentieth century ===
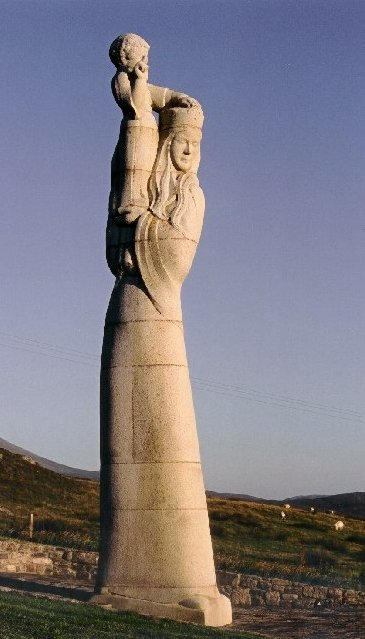
Hew Lorimer's Our Lady of the Isles (1957) on South Uist

The late nineteenth century and early twentieth century saw the emergence of the Glasgow School, a term that is used for a number of loose groups based around the city. The most important grouping, active from about 1890 and known as "The Four" or the "Spook School", included acclaimed architect and artist Charles Rennie Mackintosh (1868–1928). They produced a distinctive blend of influences, including the Celtic Revival, the Arts and Crafts Movement, and Japonisme, which found favour throughout the modern art world of continental Europe and helped define the Art Nouveau style. Beside important buildings and paintings, Mackintosh also produced significant and influential objects, including his 1904 designs for an order desk chair for the Willow Tea Rooms in Sauchiehall Street, Glasgow, based on a highly geometrised version of the willow tree, and his Revolving Bookcase for Hous'hill, which prefigured the international style of the next generation.

The major project of the Scottish National War Memorial within Edinburgh Castle, built by Robert Lorimer (1864–1929) to commemorate the dead of the First World War from 1924 to 1927, provided opportunities for sculptors, many of whom were drawn from Edinburgh College of Art. These included Percy Portsmouth (1874–1953), Alice Meredith Williams (1880–1934), and her husband Morris Meredith Williams (1881–1973), Alexander Carrick (1882–1966), Pilkington Jackson (1887–1973) and Phyllis Bone (1894–1972). The project helped cement an Arts and Craft ethos in Scottish sculpture, which was perpetuated Carrick's students Tom Whalen (1903–75) and Hew Lorimer (1907–93), the son of the architect Robert. Lorimer briefly studied with the leading Arts and Crafts sculptor Eric Gill and contributed several major works of public sculpture, including the 27 feet (8 m) high granite Our Lady of the Isles (1957), situated on South Uist.

In contrast to the prevailing Arts and Crafts ethos in Scotland, influences from contemporary Europe were contributed to sculpture by J. D. Fergusson, best known as one of the Scottish Colourists. As in his painting, his sculpture, like the bronze bust Eastre (Hymn to the Sun) (1924), incorporated a modernist sensibility. Contemporary developments were also significant in the career of Benno Schotz. Born in Estonia of Jewish descent, he originally came to Glasgow as an engineer, but changed to sculpture, producing work influenced by Auguste Rodin and Jacob Epstein. His works included the female figure of The Lament (1943), which focused on the anguish of the Holocaust. His influence was extended by his tenure as head of Sculpture at Glasgow School of Art. Eric Schilsky (1898–1974), born in England, worked in the existing tradition of modelling and carving, but his work had a European sensibility that was particularly influential during his time as director of sculpture at Edinburgh College of Art.

=== Late twentieth century to the present ===
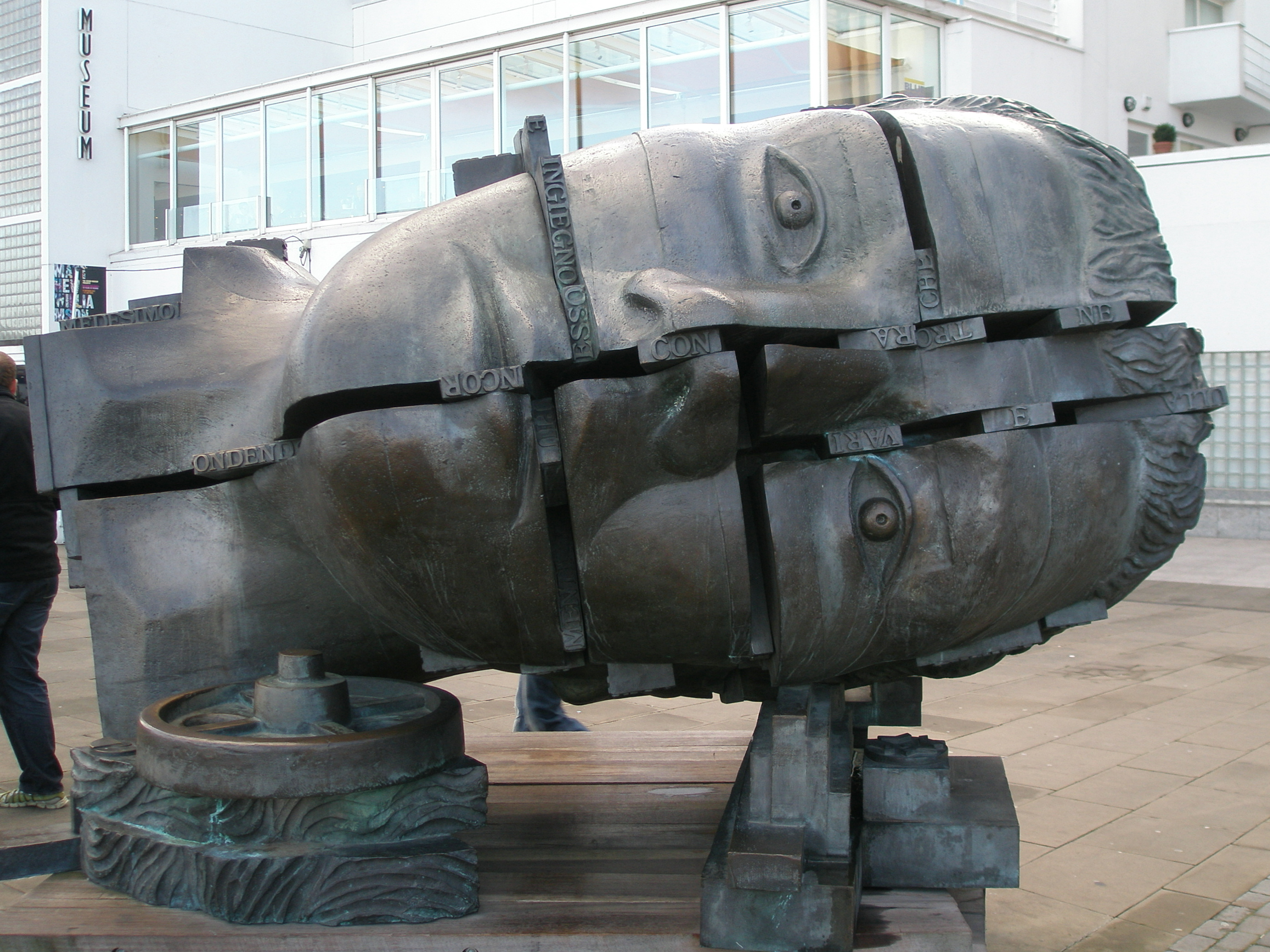
Eduardo Paolozzi's Head of Invention (1989), installed in front of the Design Museum on the Thames at Butler's Wharf, London

After the Second World War a new generation of artists emerged, often more directly influenced by modernism. George Innes (1913–70) experimented with pre-Columbian and Cubist-influenced primitivism. Primitivism was also an influence on the early work of William Turnbull (1922–2012) and Eduardo Paolozzi (1924–2005), who met at the Slade School of Fine Art after the war and both later studied in Paris. Turnbull's War Goddess (1956) is a commentary on the horrors of technological warfare and Paelozzi's Icarus (1957) deals with the classical myth of an individual overreaching themselves. Paolozzi became a pioneer of pop art in the 1960s and in the 1980s and 1990s produced massive public bronze sculptures. Many works that examined juxtapositions between myth, fantasy and the modern world. Ian Hamilton Finlay's (1925–2006) work existed outside of any obvious movement, but nevertheless he emerged as a key figure in Scottish art. He explored the boundaries between sculpture, print making, literature (especially concrete poetry) and landscape architecture. His most ambitious work, the garden of Little Sparta opened in 1960 and mixes landscape, sculpture and text. George Wyllie (1921–2012), produced works of social and political commentary including the Straw Locomotive (1987), an event which raised questions about the decline of heavy industry and the nature of colonialism.

The establishment of the National Gallery of Modern Art in Edinburgh in 1960 provided new possibilities for the display of sculpture. The grounds were initially dominated by two pieces by Henry Moore (1898–86), which were late joined by other major works, including those by Scottish artists. The 1970s saw the emergence of installation and environmental art. Members of the Boyle Family (Mark Boyle, 1934–2005, Jullia Hills, b. 1936, and their two children, Sebastian, b. 1962, and Georgia, b. 1963) have produced work that has included performances and earth sculptures. Their Journey to the Surface of the Earth project, begun in 1967, involved the re-creation of randomly chosen, sections of the earth's surface, designed to challenge ideas of representation and objectivity. The short-lived Ceramic Workshop in Edinburgh (1970–74) hosted installations by Merilyn Smith (b. 1942) and the Romanian artist Paul Neagu (1938–2004), but demonstrated both interest in the medium and the problems of funding it. It was boosted by the appointment of David Harding (b. 1937) to be the first head of the Department of Environmental Art at Glasgow School of Art in 1985.

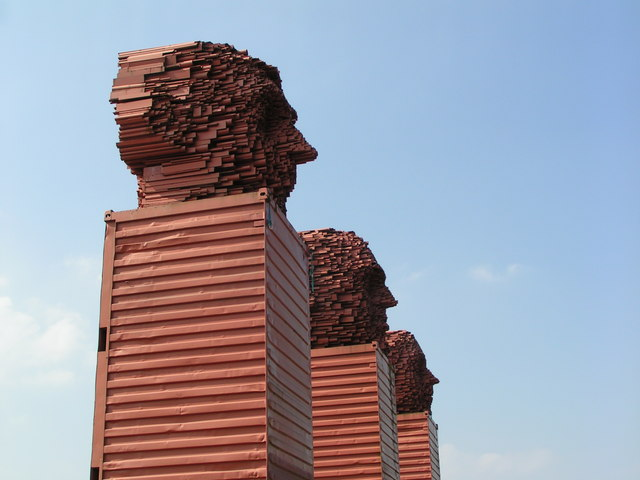
David Mach's Big Heids (1999), Lanarkshire, a tribute to the Scottish steel industry

In the late twentieth century, new sources of direct government arts funding encouraged greater experimentation, which incorporated aspects of modernism. Among the next generation of sculptors such as Jake Harvey (b. 1948), Doug Cocker (b. 1945), Ainslie Yule (b. 1941) and Gavin Scobie (1940–2012). In contrast to the prevailing trends of modernism and conceptual art Sandy Stoddart (b. 1959) works primarily on "nationalist" figurative sculpture in clay within the neoclassical tradition. He is best known for his civic monuments, including 10 feet (3.0 m) bronze statues of the philosophers David Hume and Adam Smith (both 1996), on the Royal Mile in Edinburgh.

Ideas-based art began to dominate Scottish sculpture from the mid 1980s. A number of women sculptors, public artists and installation artists rose to prominence in what had been a male dominated area. These included Kirsty McGhie (b. 1959), Sybille von Halem (b. 1963) and Claire Barclay (b. 1968), all of whom were graduates of Environmental Art at Glasgow. Particularly significant were artists involved with the Transmission Gallery and Variant magazine in Glasgow. Of these Douglas Gordon went on to win the Turner Prize in 1996 and Christine Borland (b. 1965) was short-listed the following year. Contemporary sculptors that have emerged since the 1980s include David Mach (b. 1960), working in the mediums of sculpture and installation art. He has produced work including his Big Heids (1997), which provided a commentary on the declining iron industry. James Lambie (b. 1965) specialises in colourful sculptural installations. Simon Starling's conceptual art includes Shedboatshed, which won the Turner Prize in 2003. In 2003, Lambing, Starling and Barclay were chosen to represent the newly devolved-Scotland at the Venice Biennale, marking the place of Scotland, and particularly Glasgow, as a hub of European art culture. A group that emerged from Glasgow School of Art in the early 1990s, and later described as "The Irascibles", included sculptor Martin Boyce (b. 1967), who won the Turner Prize in 2011 for his installation Do Words Have Voices.

== Sculpture parks ==
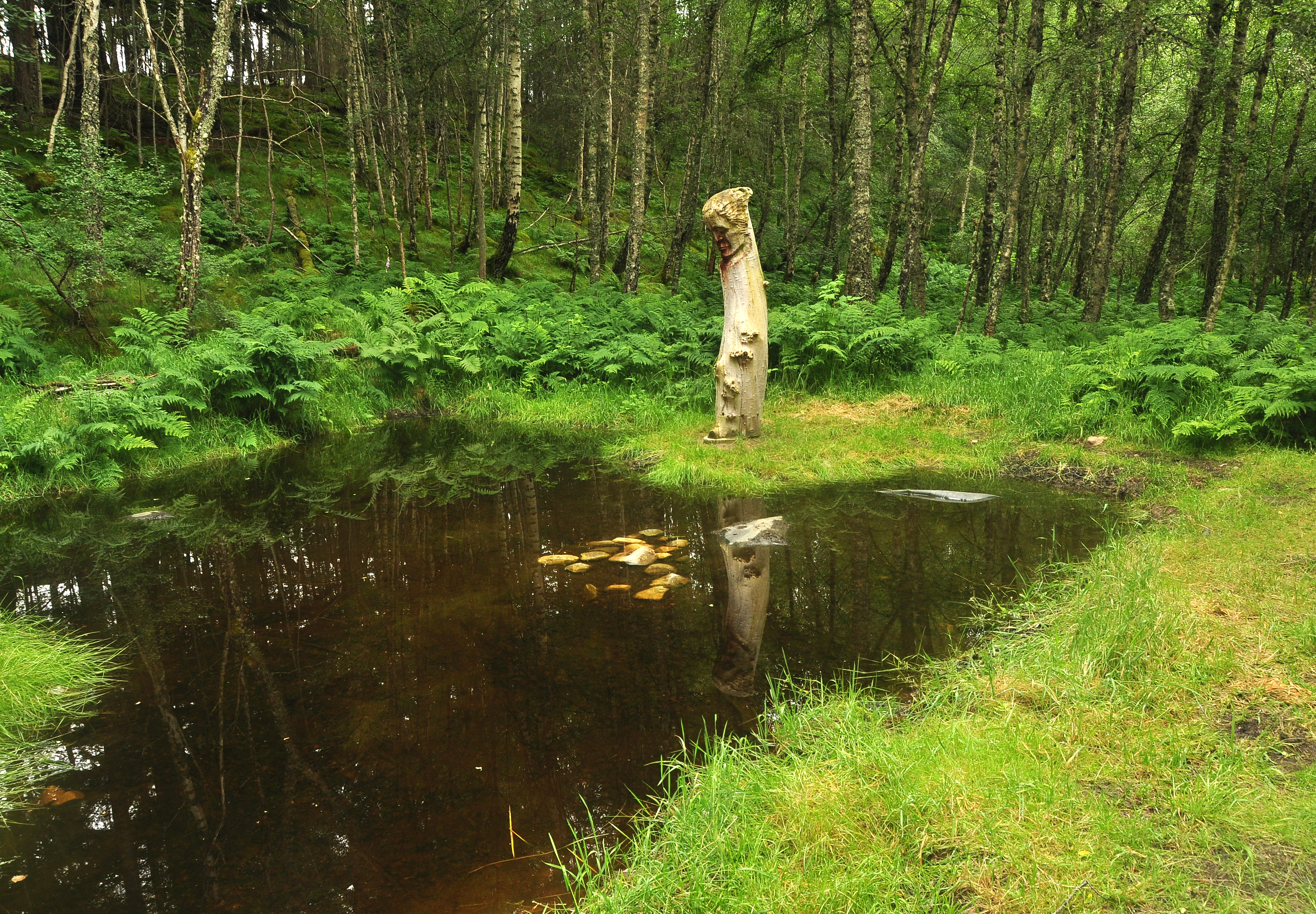
"The Thinker", one of the sculptures in the Frank Bruce Sculpture Park, near Aviemore

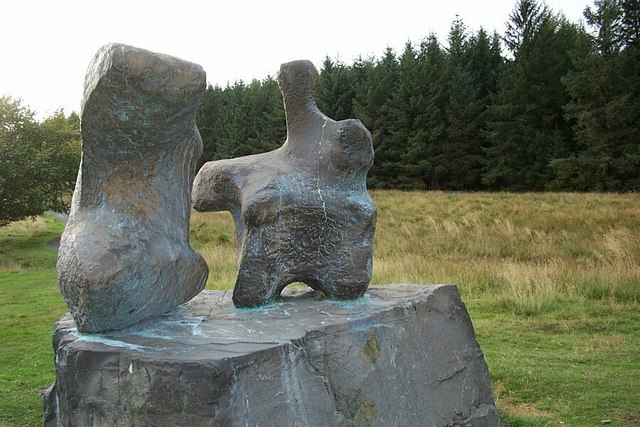
"Two Piece Reclining Figure No.1" by Henry Moore, Glenkiln Sculpture Park

Although the first sculpture park in Scotland was established privately at Glenkiln, Dumfriesshire in 1955, it was in the late 1970s and 1980s that they began to be fully developed. The Scottish Sculpture Trust founded in 1978 established the Highland Sculpture Park that year. A similar project was soon begun at Glenshee. The Scottish Sculpture Workshop, begun by sculptor Fred Bushe (1931–2009) in 1979, organised the first Scottish Sculpture Open at Kildrummy Castle in 1981 in Aberdeenshire and it became an annual event. The Cramond Sculpture Park was set up in Edinburgh in 1985 to accommodate the mixed media work emerging from art schools in Scotland. The Highland Sculpture Park, Glenshee and Cramond all closed within a few years, but there are numerous other parks within Scotland. Current sculpture parks include:

- Art in Galloway Forest Park Programme
- Caol Ruadh Sculpture Park
- Frank Bruce Sculpture Trail
- Glenkiln Sculpture Park
- Gretna Green Sculpture Garden
- The Hidden Gardens
- Jupiter Artland
- Little Sparta
- Modern Art Galleries Sculpture Garden
- Place of Origin
- Scottish Sculpture Workshop: Sculpture Walk
- Striding Arches
- Tyrebagger Sculpture Project

== See also ==
- List of public art in Edinburgh
- Public statues in Glasgow
- Scottish war memorials
