= Victoria Whitworth =

Anglo-Scots novelist, archaeologist and art historian

Victoria Whitworth FSA FSA Scot
- Born: Victoria Thompson; 1966 (age 59–60); London
- Education: St Anne's College, Oxford; University of York
- Writing career
- Genre: non-fiction

Victoria (V.M.) Whitworth (née Thompson; born in London 1966) is a British writer, archaeologist and art historian. Her published writings, which focus on Britain in the later first millennium AD, include novels, academic works and a memoir.

== Biography ==
Victoria Whitworth studied English (specialising in Medieval languages, literature and archaeology) at St Anne's College, Oxford, before doing an MA and a D.Phil. in York. From 2012 to 2016 she was a lecturer at the Centre for Nordic Studies on the Orkney campus of the University of the Highlands and Islands. Her research has primarily focused on Pictish, Scottish and Anglo-Saxon stone sculpture. Whitworth has published three historical novels set in Viking Age England.

On 27 September 2020 a letter in support of J. K. Rowling for her stance on transgender issues was published in the Sunday Times to which Whitworth was one of 58 signatories.

In 2025, Whitworth suggested that since the Book of Kells contains elaborate display capital letters in a style similar to the sculptures at the Pictish monastery in Portmahomack in Northeast Scotland, it may derive from there, not from Iona.

== Honours and distinctions ==
Whitworth is a fellow of the Society of Antiquaries and of the Society of Antiquaries of Scotland.

== Books ==
=== Fiction ===
- The Bone Thief (Ebury Press, 2012), ISBN 978-0091947231
- The Traitors’ Pit (Ebury Press, 2013), ISBN 978-0091947187
- Daughter of the Wolf (Head of Zeus, 2016), ISBN 978-1784082147

=== Non-fiction ===
- Swimming with Seals (Head of Zeus, 2016), ISBN 978-1784978372
- Dying and Death in Later Anglo-Saxon England (Boydell & Brewer, 2004), ISBN 1843830701
- Bodystones and Guardian Beasts: The Gravestones of Middle Britain from the 8th to 11th Centuries (Oxford University Press
- The Book of Kells: Unlocking the Enigma (Bloomsbury, 2025) ISBN 978-1788541800
