= Holm of Papa =

Small uninhabited island in the Orkney Islands, Scotland

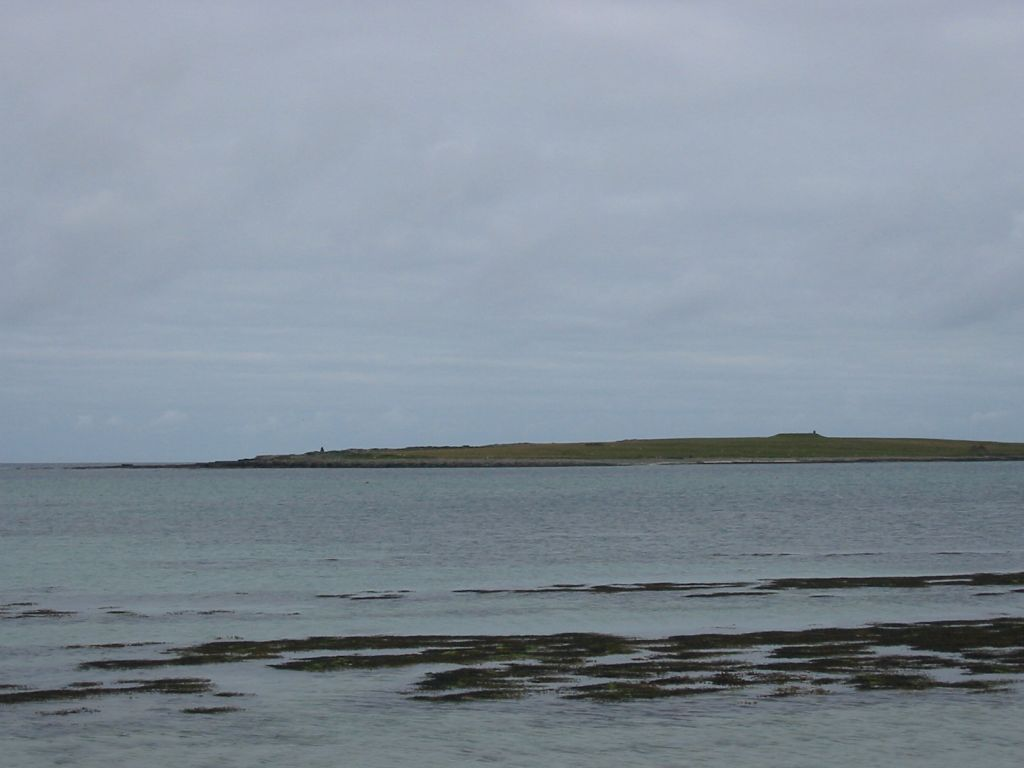
- Holm of Papa, viewed across South Wick, from Papa Westray

Location
- Holm of Papa shown within Orkney
- OS grid reference: HY507519
- Coordinates: 59°21′03″N 2°52′07″W

Physical geography
- Island group: Orkney
- Area: 21 ha
- Highest elevation: 15 m (49 ft)

Administration
- Council area: Orkney Islands
- Country: Scotland
- Sovereign state: United Kingdom

Demographics
- Population: 0

The Holm of Papa (or Holm of Papay, Holm of Papa Westray and known locally as the Papay Holm,) is a very small uninhabited island in the Orkney Islands. It is around 21 hectares (52 acres) in size. It can be visited from its neighbouring island Papa Westray, or Papay, an island less than a hundred metres west of the Holm.

== Prehistory ==
The main sight on the small island is the Southcairn, a 20 metre long chambered cairn dating from approx. 3000 BC on whose stones one can find ancient carvings. The long, stalled cairn, built of local stone, was once a communal burial place for the bones of an ancient community. It is protected by a modern roof and entered by a trapdoor from above. It is possible that the inhabitants of the Knap of Howar buried their dead here. There are three ancient chambered cairns on the holm. Visitors can arrange privately for small boat access through the Co-op shop on Papa Westray. The cairn is readily visible from the larger island.

“Eyebrow motif” carvings found in the southernmost chambered cairn bear a resemblance to the "eyes" of the Orkney Venus found at Links of Noltland on Westray.

== History ==
Joseph Anderson noted that in the Orkneyinga saga "The two Papeys, the great and the little (anciently Papey Meiri and Papey Minni), now Papa Westray and Papa Stronsay, are both mentioned in the Saga. Fordun in his enumeration of the islands, has a 'Papeay tertia' [third Papey], which is not now known." William Thomson suggests that "perhaps Papay Tercia was the Holm of Papay — not a separate papar-site but a holm subsidiary to Papa Westray".
