= Cramond Lioness =

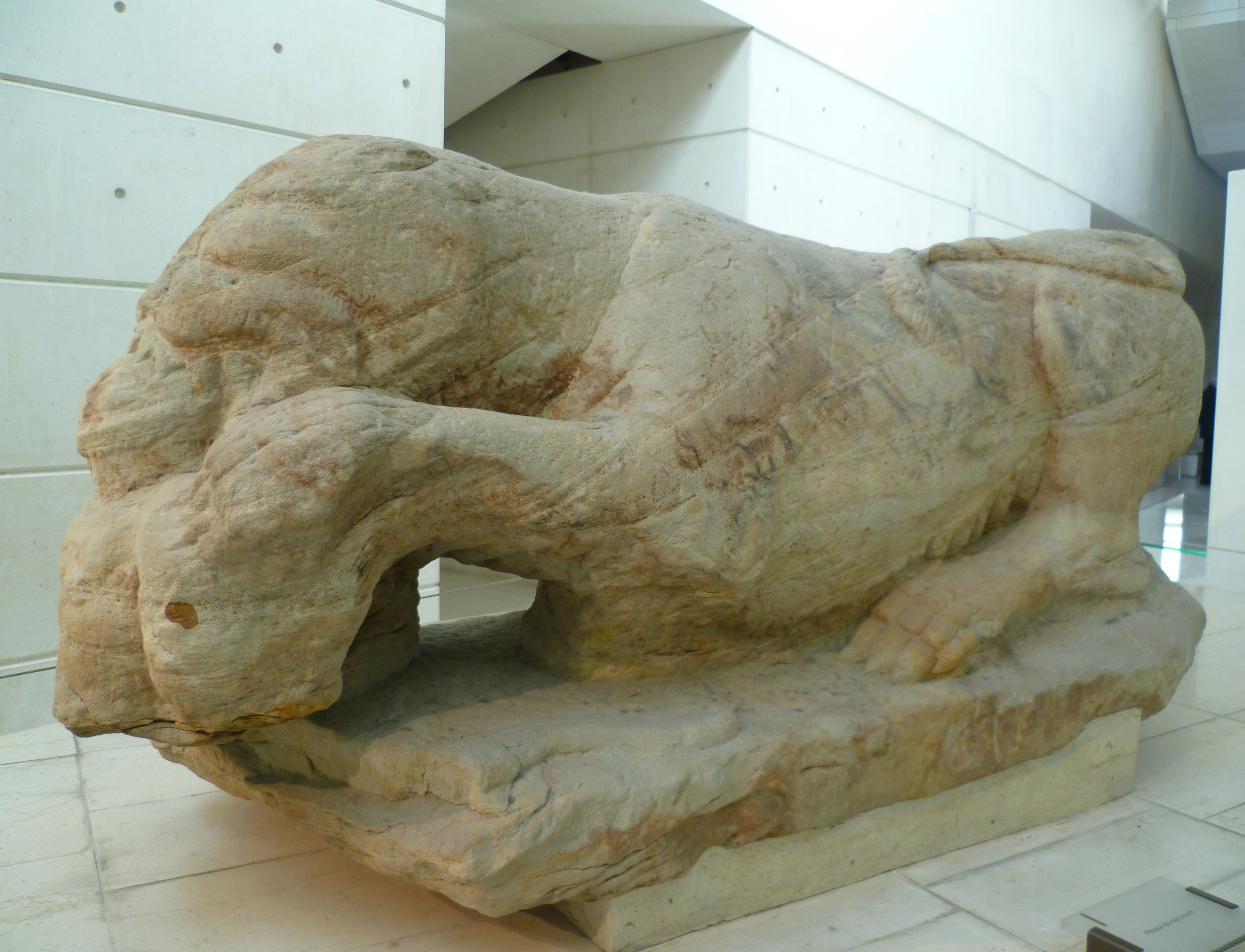
The Cramond Lioness in the National Museum of Scotland

The Cramond Lioness is a Roman-era sculpture recovered in 1997 from the mouth of the River Almond at Cramond in Edinburgh, Scotland. The sculpture, one of the most important Roman finds in Scotland for decades, was discovered by ferryman Robert Graham.

It depicts a bound male prisoner being killed by a lioness. The upper torso and head of the prisoner are shown, with the giant lioness behind him, sinking her teeth into his skull.

It is a large sculpture carved from a single block of stone. It is 1.52 metres long, 0.46 m wide, and 0.55 m high. A separate plinth was found nearby bearing carvings of two snakes.

The work is interpreted as a Roman sculpture possibly imported to Scotland, or possibly carved in situ, to serve as part of the tomb of a Roman military commander or dignitary, and connected to the Cramond Roman Fort next to which it was found. The location of such a tomb, and how the sculpture reached its location in the river, are unknown.

The sculpture is housed in the National Museum of Scotland in Edinburgh. In 2003, plans were unveiled for the lioness to be housed in a new archaeological centre at the Roman Fort in Cramond; this proposal was still at the initial planning stage in 2008.
