= Westray Wife =

Neolithic sculpture found in Scotland

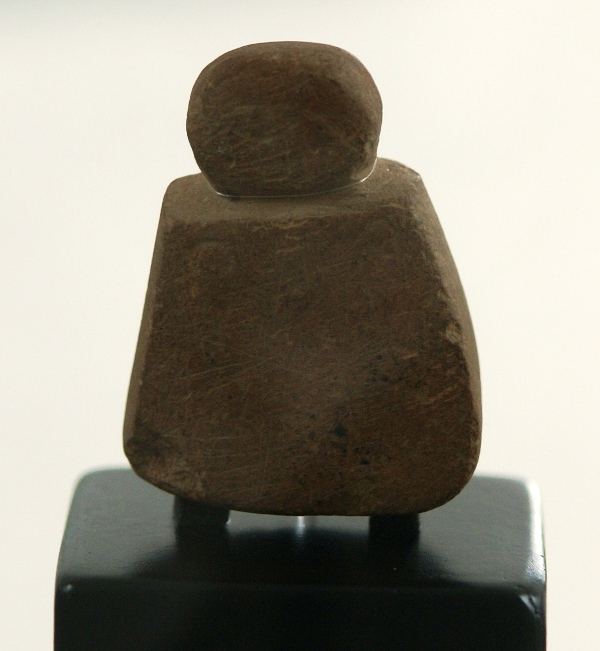
The Westray Wife

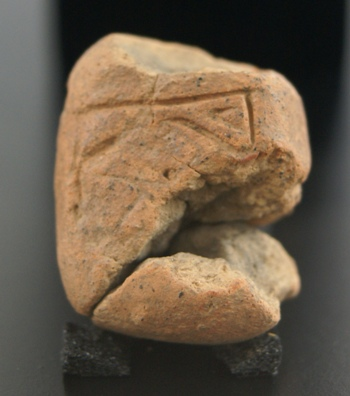
The second figurine

The Westray Wife (also known as the Orkney Venus) is a small Neolithic figurine, 4 centimetres (1.6 in) in height, carved from sandstone. It was discovered during an Historic Scotland dig at the Links of Noltland, on Westray, Orkney, Scotland, in the summer of 2009. It was the first Neolithic carving of a human form to have been found in Scotland, and to date it is the earliest depiction of a face found in the United Kingdom.

A second figurine of about the same size and shape as the Westray Wife, but made from clay, and missing its head, was discovered by archaeologists at the same Links of Noltland site during the summer of 2010. This figurine, 3.4 centimetres (1.3 in) in height, has a rectangular panel decorated with triangles on the front of its torso, which may represent a tunic, and a punched hole in the centre of its stomach. A number of small clay balls have also been discovered at the site, and it is possible that these were intended for use as heads for similar figurines. A third figurine was discovered in 2012.

It has been noted that the original figure's eyes bear a resemblance to "eyebrow motif" carvings found in a chambered cairn on the Holm of Papa. Archaeologist Richard Strachan has said:

Initial comparisons do show a similarity in use of this eyebrow motif and may point to the possibility that the markings in the cairn are meant to show human eyebrows and eyes, as the style is very similar to the figurine. Alternatively, we may be seeing the re-use of a motif familiar to the carver and applied to different contexts with different meaning.

Despite the figurine's name, it is not certain that the Westray Wife does represent a female form, as the marks initially interpreted as breasts may in fact represent clothing fasteners and clothing fabric. The figurine was on display in the Westray Heritage Centre in Pierowall for the summer of 2010, and an enterprising local baker created "Westray Wifie" shortbread replicas for sale. In 2010, some local businesses reported a 45% increase in turnover since the discovery of the figurine.

== See also ==
- List of Stone Age art
- Venus figurines
