= Links of Noltland =

Archaeological site in Orkney, Scotland

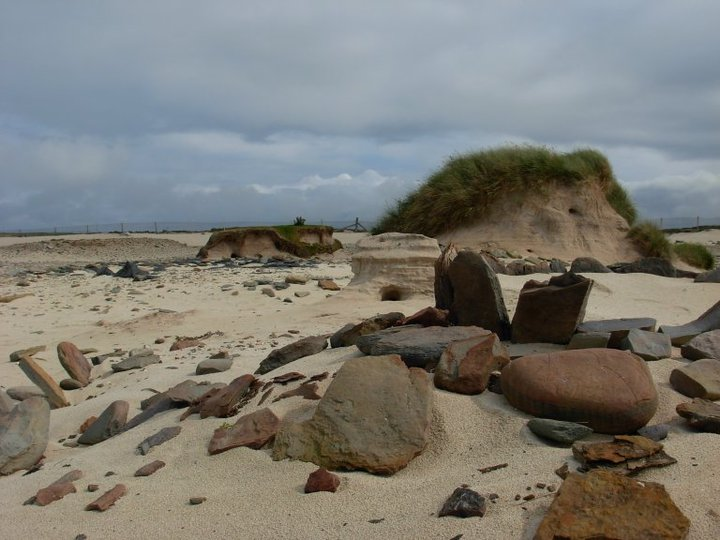
- The site in 2010

- Location in Scotland, United Kingdom
- 59°19′34″N 3°00′21″W
- Type: Settlement
- Location: Scotland, United Kingdom

History
- Built: c. 3300 BC
- Abandoned: c. 800 BC

Links of Noltland was a large prehistoric settlement located on the north coast of the island of Westray in Orkney, Scotland. The extensive ruins includes several late Neolithic and early Bronze Age dwellings and is place of discovery of the Westray Wife figurine, uncovered during an excavation in 2009. Historic Environment Scotland established the site as a scheduled monument in 1993.

== Location ==
Links of Noltland is located south of the Bay of Grobust on the island of Westray in Orkney, Scotland. Close to the site is the Knowe of Queen o' Howe broch and further south is Noltland Castle. The site is threatened by erosion of the sand dunes.

== Description ==
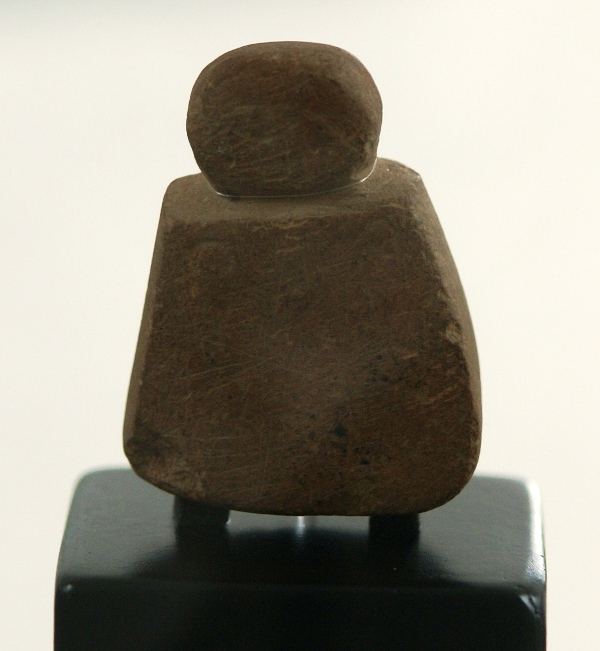
The Westray Wife

The ancient settlement, dating from around 3300 BC to 800 BC, contains late Neolithic and Bronze Age structural ruins, now buried beneath sand dunes. Excavations have revealed over 30 buildings of Neolithic and Bronze Age date, the earliest of which overlaps in use with the Knap of Howar on the neighbouring island of Papa Westray, the oldest standing structure in NW Europe. During excavations between 1978 and 1981, large midden deposits, structural remains, and field walls, which indicated evidence of prehistoric cultivation and field boundaries, were uncovered. Among the finds in the western area of the site was a hearth and several red deer skeletons. In the eastern section of the archaeological site, was a large building which had survived to roof height. The structure included several separate rooms and compartments joined by passages. In 2015, a substantial subterranean building dating from the Bronze Age was uncovered; this was very well preserved and is interpreted as a sweat-house or sauna.

In 2009, archaeological excavation uncovered a large building described as a "village hall". The structure overlooks the main settlement and would have been about 20 metres (66 ft) wide and had walls 3 metres (9.8 ft) thick. During this excavation, a 4 cm lozenge-shaped figurine that is believed to be the earliest representation of a human face ever found in Scotland, now known as the Westray Wife (or Orkney Venus) was discovered. The face has two dots for eyes, heavy brows and an oblong nose and a pattern of hatches on the body could represent clothing. Archaeologist Richard Strachan described it at the time as a find of "astonishing rarity". This is the oldest carving of a human found in the British Isles. Further figurines were subsequently found at the site, in 2010 and in 2012, a situation described as "unprecedented" by Culture Minister Fiona Hyslop. Four figurines have been found, together with other artefacts.

Later excavations, along with geophysical and topographical surveys, have revealed additional structural remains, increasing the number of probable Neolithic buildings to six and the number of Bronze Age buildings to eight. Many Neolithic artefacts have been found, including polished stone axes, worked bone objects, and grooved ware pottery.

Historic Environment Scotland established the site as a scheduled monument in 1993. The site is in the care of Historic Scotland. The excavations won 'Best Rescue Dig' of the year in the 2014 Current Archaeology awards.

Several of the figurines and other artefacts from the site can be seen at Westray Heritage Centre and the excavation is open seasonally (free of charge).

== See also ==
- Timeline of prehistoric Scotland
- Ness of Brodgar
