= Prehistoric Scotland =

Prehistory of Scotland

Archaeology and geology continue to reveal the secrets of prehistoric Scotland, uncovering a complex past before the Romans brought Scotland into the scope of recorded history. Successive human cultures tended to be spread across Europe or further afield, but focusing on this particular geographical area sheds light on the origin of the widespread remains and monuments in Scotland, and on the background to the history of Scotland.

The extent of open countryside untouched by intensive farming, together with past availability of stone rather than timber, has given Scotland a wealth of accessible sites where the ancient past can be seen.

== The remote prehistory of Scotland ==
Scotland is geologically alien to Europe, comprising a sliver of the ancient continent of Laurentia (which later formed the bulk of North America). During the Cambrian period the crustal region which became Scotland formed part of the continental shelf of Laurentia, then still south of the equator. Laurentia was separated from the continent of Baltica (which later became Scandinavia and the Baltic region) by the diminishing Iapetus Ocean. The two ancient continents moved toward one another through the Cambrian and Ordovician periods, with tectonic folding during the Silurian pushing the first Scottish land above water. The final collision occurred during the Devonian period, with the Scottish segment of the Laurentian plate smashing into Avalonia (which contained what is now most of England and Wales), a motile subcontinent which had previously joined with Baltica.

This impact threw up a massive chain of mountains (at least as tall as the present-day Alps) and saw the formation of the granitic West Highland and Grampian mountain chains and (through the Carboniferous) a period of volcanic activity in central and eastern Scotland. During the Permian and Triassic periods, with the Iapetus Ocean entirely closed, Scotland lay near the centre of the Pangaean supercontinent. At the start of the Tertiary, a constructive plate boundary (at which tectonic plates move apart) became active between Laurentia and Eurasia, pushing the two apart (and parting Scotland from Laurentia). This recession opened the Atlantic Ocean for the first time, and the consequent subduction zone at the western plate margin led to a renewed period of volcanism, this time on Scotland's west coast, producing fresh mountains on Skye, Jura, Mull, Rùm, and Arran.

This tectonic activity produced the basis of Scotland's topography: ancient mountains in the North and South of the country, partially eroded by 400 million years of water and ice with a wide fertile valley between them, and a newer, wilder western terrain. With Scotland now in the northern temperate zone, it was subjected to numerous glaciations in the Neogene and Quaternary periods, the ice sheets and their attendant glaciers carving the landscape into a typical postglacial one, overdeepening river valleys into the characteristic U-shape and leaving the upland areas covered with glacial corries and dramatic pyramidal peaks. In lowland areas the ice deposited rich fields of fertile glacial till and eroded the softer material surrounding the extinct volcanoes (particularly the older Carboniferous ones), leaving many crags.

== Before modern humans ==
During the last interglacial, around 130,000–70,000 BC, there were times when the climate in Europe was warmer than it is today, and after the Neanderthals came to prominence there was another mild spell around 40,000 BC. Neanderthal sites have been found in the south of England from this era, though no traces of early modern humans have been found. Repeated glaciations, which covered the entire land mass of modern Scotland, may have destroyed traces of human habitation that existed before the Mesolithic period.

Glaciers then scoured their way across most of Britain, and it was only after the ice retreated about 15,000 years ago that Scotland again became habitable.

== Hunter-gatherers ==
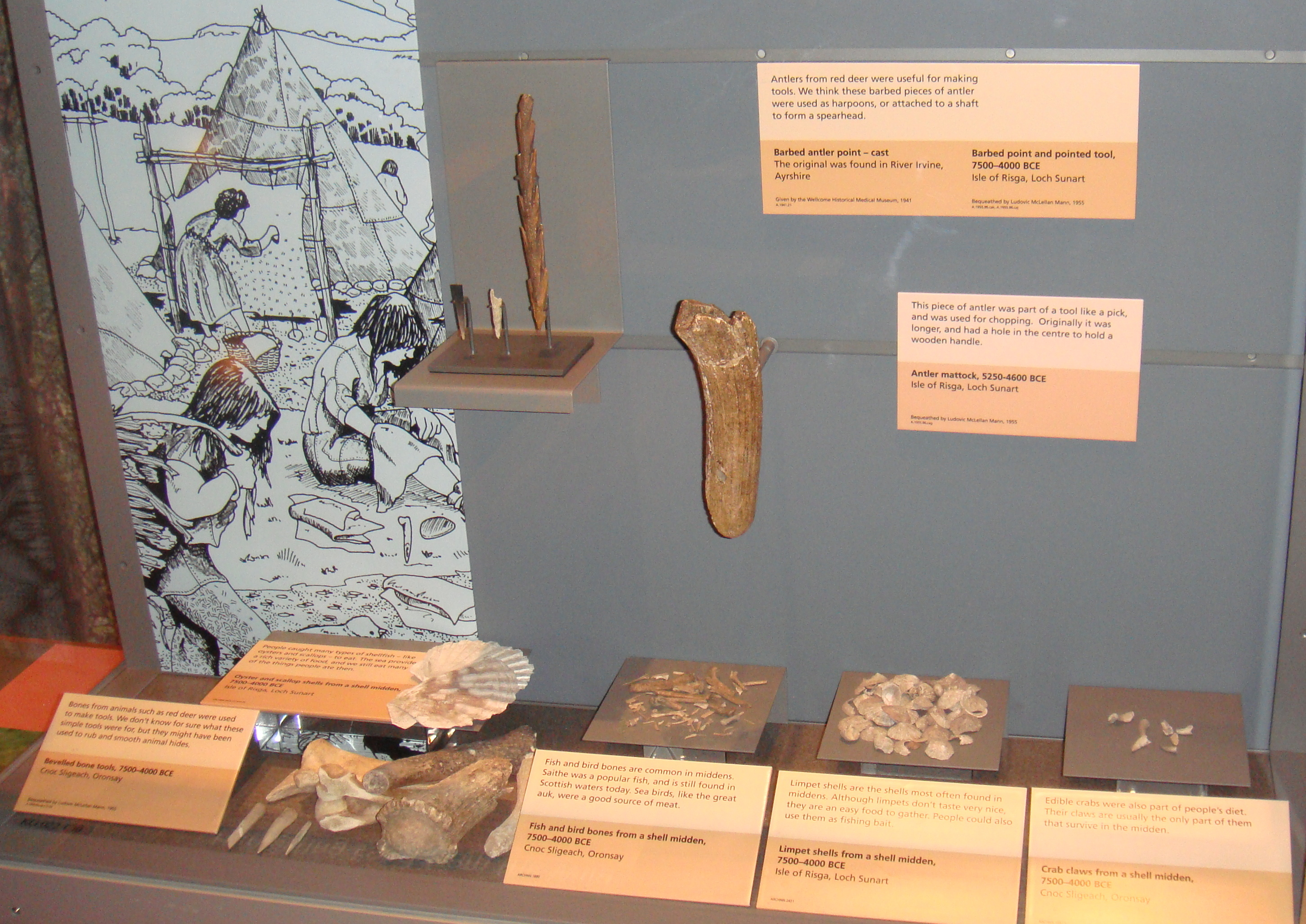
The Mesolithic

As the climate improved, mesolithic hunter-gatherers extended their range into Scotland. The earliest evidence to date is the flint artefacts found at Howburn Farm, near Elsrickle in 2005. This is the first and so far the only evidence of Upper Paleolithic human habitation in Scotland, around 12,000 BC, which appears to fall between the Younger Dryas and Lomond Stadial periods when cold conditions returned relatively briefly.

An early settlement at Cramond, near what is today Edinburgh, has been dated to around 8500 BC. Pits and stakeholes suggest a hunter-gatherer encampment, and microlith stone tools made at the site predate finds of similar style in England. Although no bones or shells had survived in the acidic soils, numerous carbonised hazelnut shells indicate cooking in a similar way to finds at other Mesolithic period sites, including the slightly earlier Star Carr and the Howick house in Northumberland, dated to 7600 BC ("Britain's oldest house"), where post holes indicate a very substantial construction, interpreted as a permanent residence for hunting people. This suggests that hunter-gatherers could also have settled down in Scotland.

Other sites on the east coast and at lochs and rivers, and large numbers of rock shelters and shell middens around the west coast and islands, build up a picture of highly mobile people, often using sites seasonally and having boats for fishing and for transporting stone tools from sites where suitable materials were found. Finds of flint tools on Ben Lawers and at Glen Dee (a mountain pass through the Cairngorms) show that these people were capable of travelling well inland across the hills.

At a rock shelter and shell midden at Sand, Applecross in Wester Ross facing Skye, excavations have shown that around 7500 BC people had tools of bone, stone and antlers, were living off shellfish, fish, and deer using "pot boiler" stones as a cooking method, were making beads from seashells, and had ochre pigment and used shellfish which can produce purple dye.

== Farmers and monument builders ==
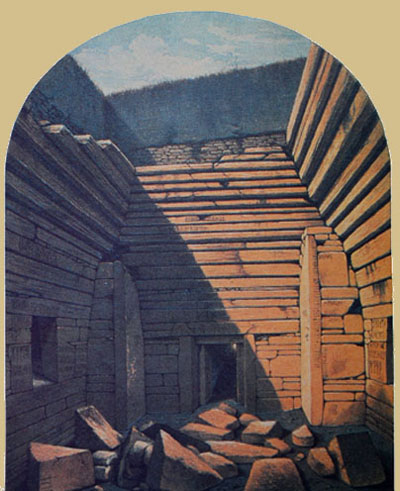
Maeshowe Neolithic tomb, Orkney, built c. 2800 BC

Neolithic farming brought permanent settlements. At Balbridie in Aberdeenshire crop markings were investigated, and ditches and post holes found, revealing a massive timber-framed building dating to about 3600 BC. An almost identical building, with evidence of pottery, was excavated at Claish near Stirling. On the islet of Eilean Domhnuill, in Loch Olabhat on North Uist, Unstan ware pottery suggests a date of 3200–2800 BC for what may be the earliest crannog. Neolithic habitation, burial, and ritual sites are particularly common and well preserved in the Northern Isles and Western Isles, where a lack of trees led to most structures being built of local stone.

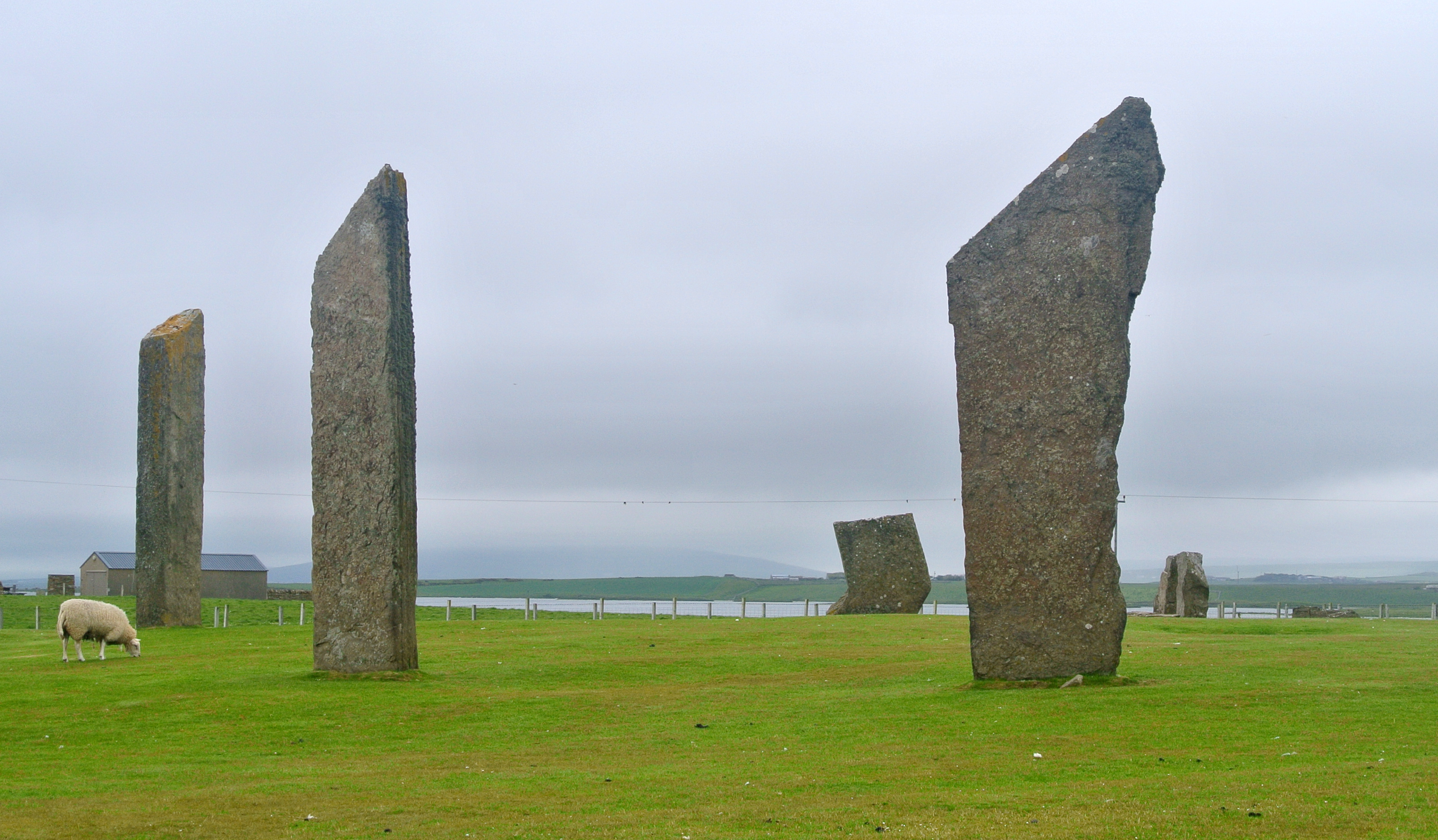
Standing Stones of Stenness, Orkney, c. 3100 BCE

The remainder of this section focuses mainly on the Orkney Islands, where there is a Neolithic landscape rich in sites amazingly preserved by prevalent use of the local stone which appears on the shore ready-split into convenient building slabs. There are many other examples across the country, many under the care of Historic Scotland.

At the stone house at Knap of Howar on the Orkney island of Papa Westray (occupied from 3500 BC to 3100 BC) the walls stand to a low eaves height, and the stone furniture is intact. Evidence from middens shows that the inhabitants kept cattle, sheep and pigs, farmed barley and wheat and gathered shellfish, as well as fishing for species which must be caught from boats using lines. Finely made and decorated Unstan ware pottery links the inhabitants to chambered cairn tombs nearby and to sites far afield, including Balbrindi and Eilean Domhnuill.

The houses at Skara Brae on the Mainland of the Orkney Islands are very similar, but are grouped into a village linked by low passageways. This settlement was occupied from about 3000 BC to 2500 BC. Pottery found here is of the grooved ware style which is found across Britain as far away as Wessex.

About 6 miles (10 km) from Skara Brae, grooved ware pottery was found at the Standing Stones of Stenness (originally a circle) which lie centrally in a close group of three major monuments. Maeshowe, the finest example of the passage grave type of chambered cairn (radiocarbon dated to before 2700 BC) lies just to the east. The Ring of Brodgar circle of standing stones is across a bridge immediately to the north. This circle was one of the first to be analysed by Professor Alexander Thom to establish the likely use of standing stones as astronomical observatories. Another Neolithic village has been found nearby at Barnhouse Settlement, and the inference is that these farming people were the builders and users of these mysterious structures.

Like the standing stones at Callanish on Lewis and other standing stones across Scotland, these monuments form part of the Europe-wide Megalithic culture which also produced Stonehenge in Wiltshire and the stone rows at Carnac in Brittany.

Further evidence can be found in Kilmartin Glen with its Stone Circles, Standing Stones and Rock Art.

The widespread connections of these people are shown by offerings imported from Cumbria and Wales and left on the sacred hilltop at Cairnpapple Hill, West Lothian, as early as 3500 BC.

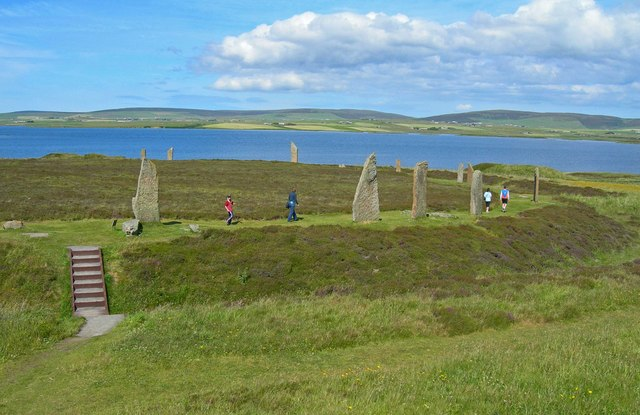
Ring of Brodgar, Orkney

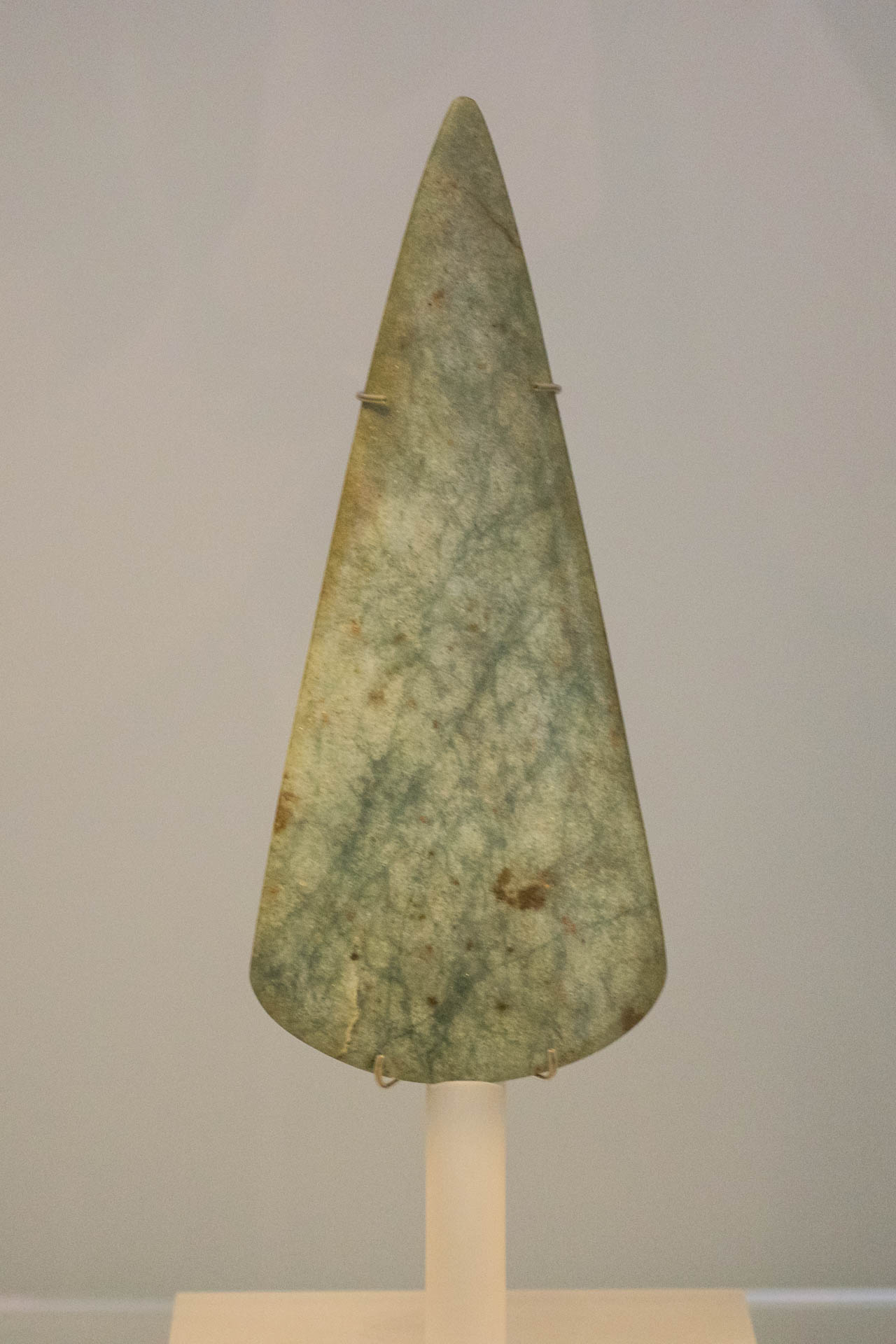
Jade axehead, imported from the Italian Alps

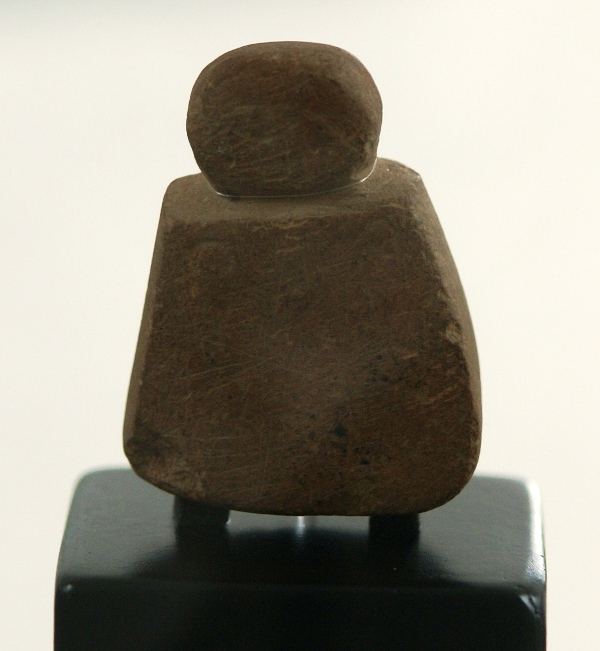
The 'Westray Wife'

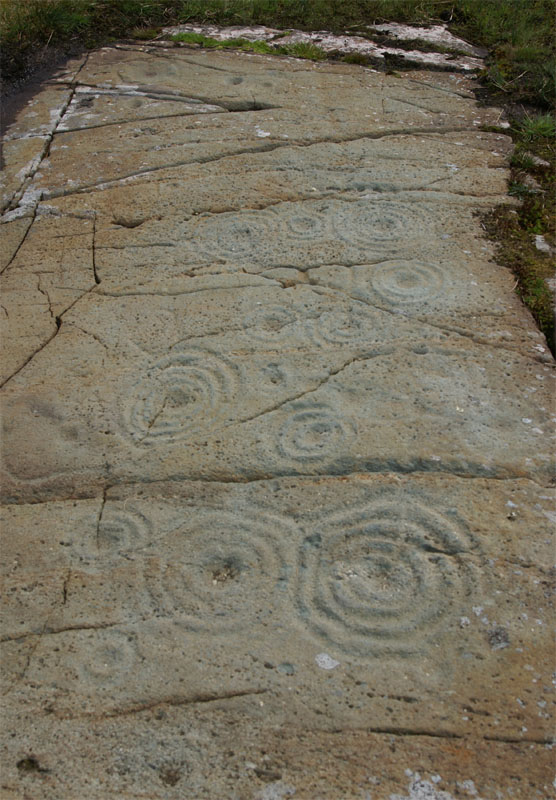
Cup and ring marks

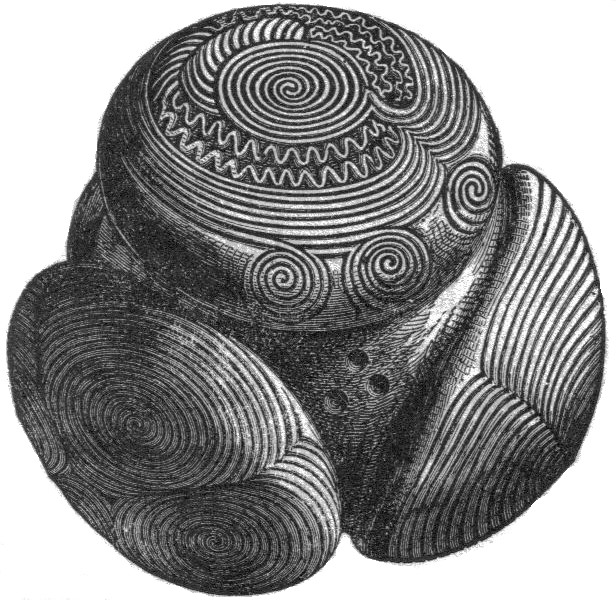
The Towie carved stone ball

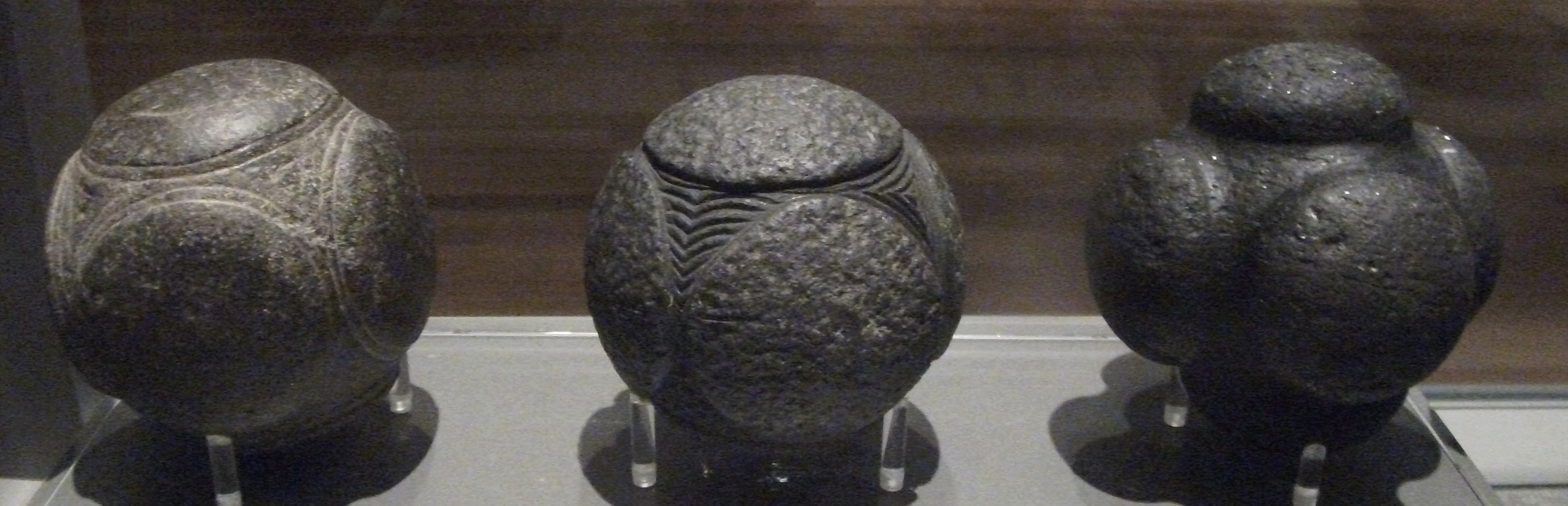
Carved stone balls

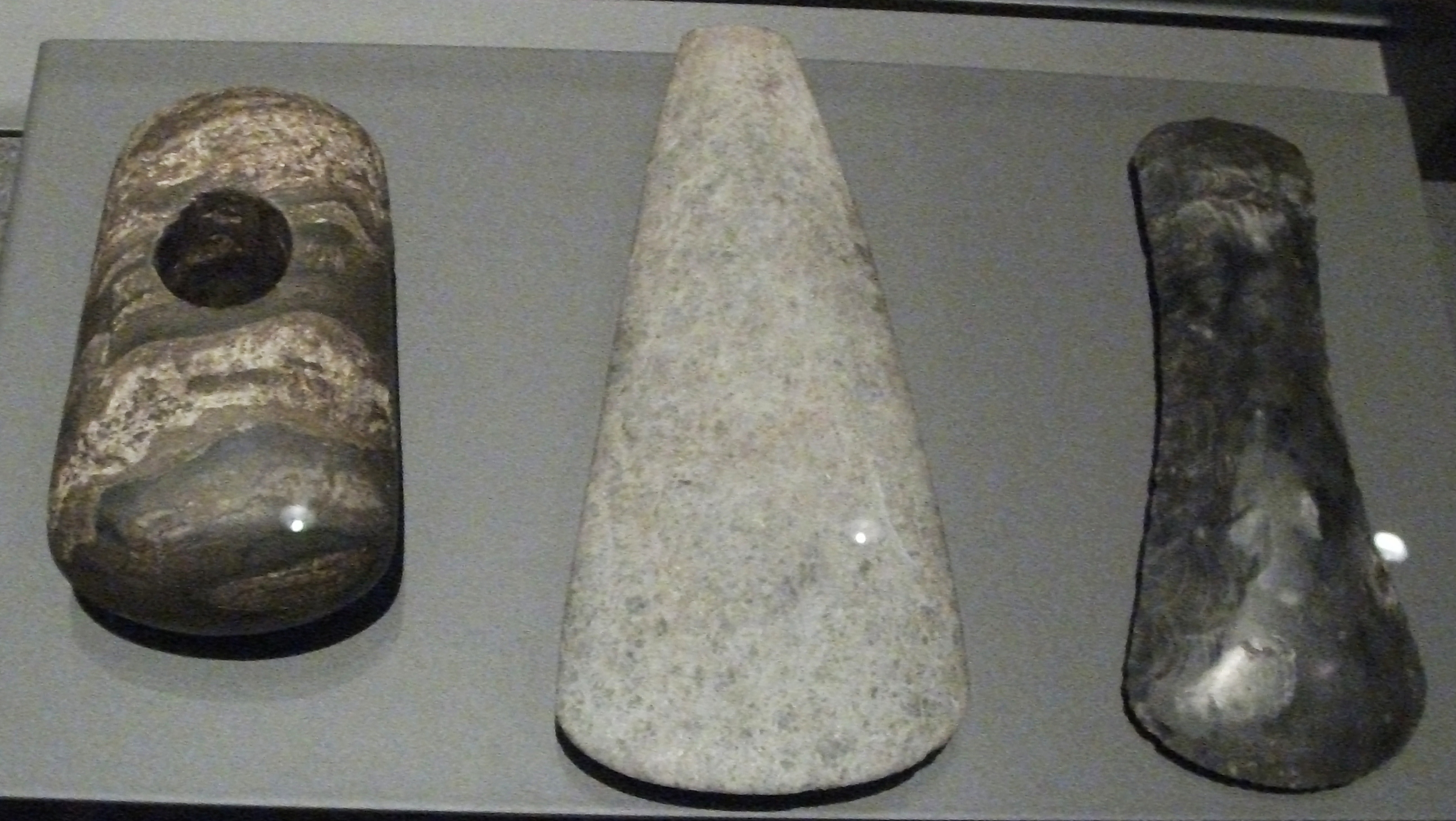
Stone mace and axes

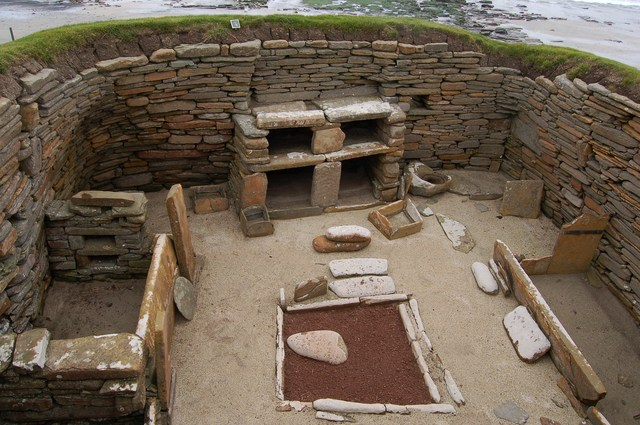
House at Skara Brae, 3180–2500 BC

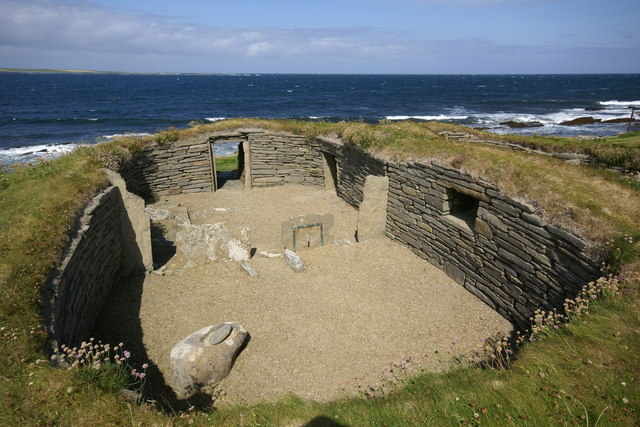
House at Knap of Howar, 3700–2800 BC

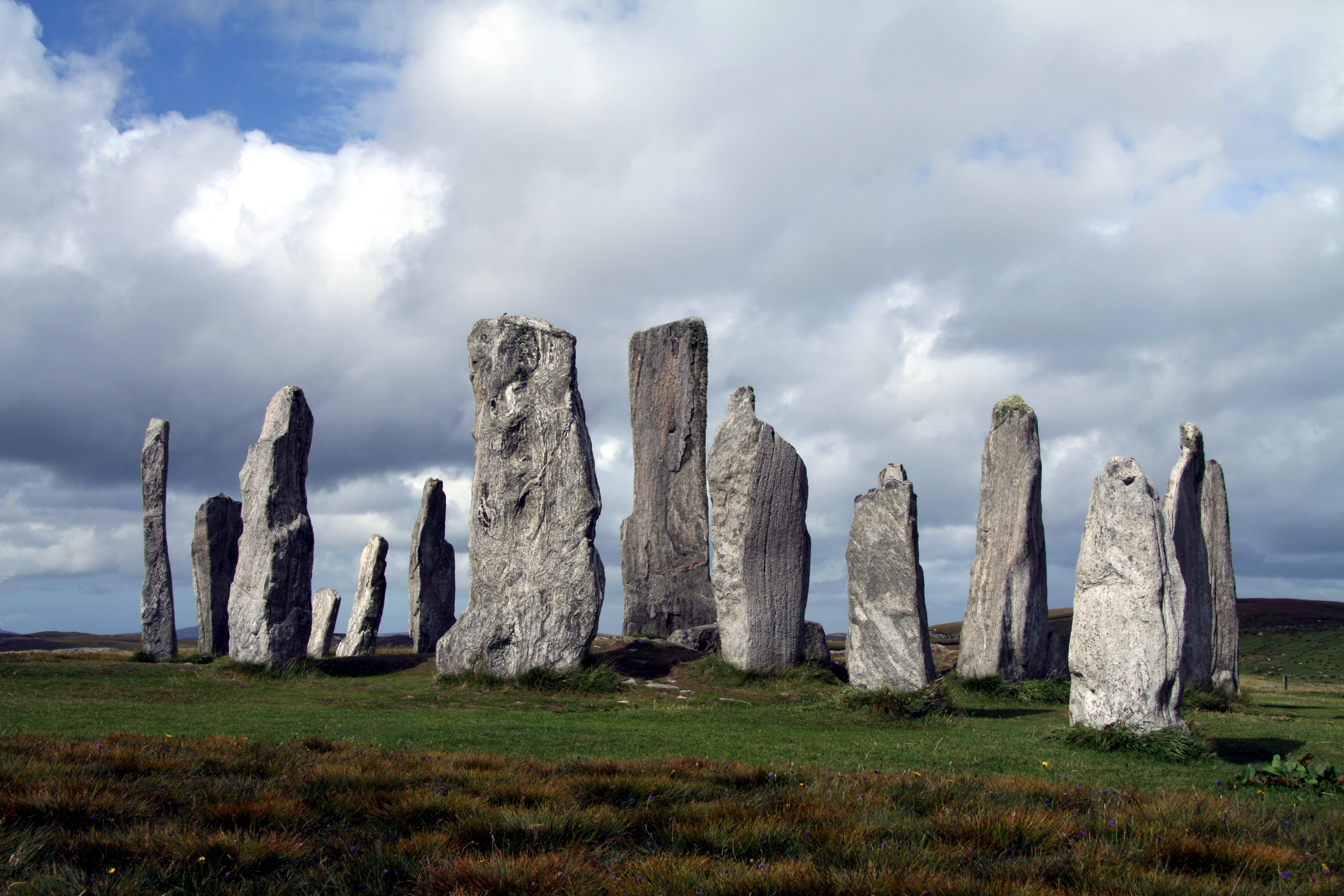
Callanish Stones,

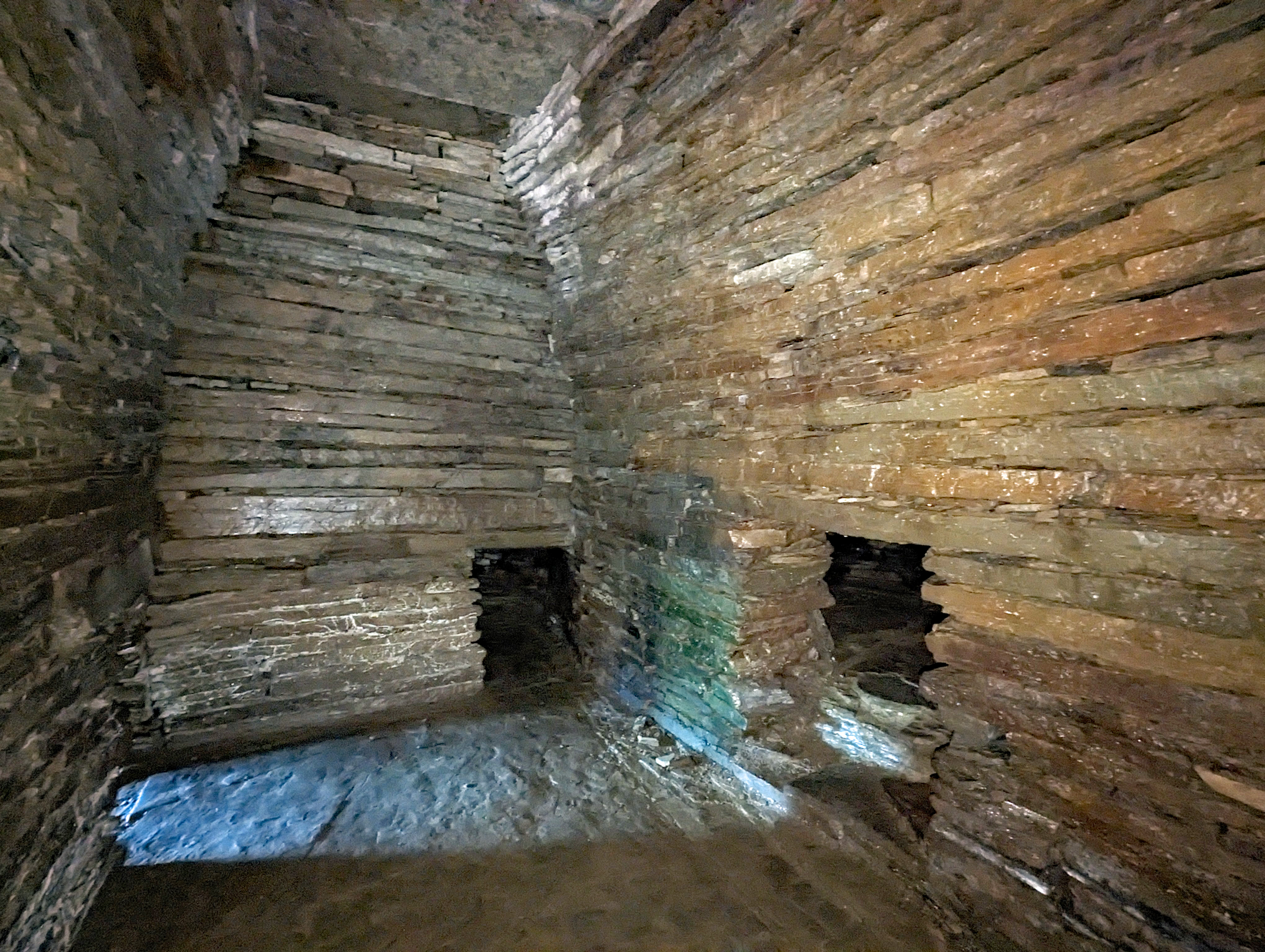
Cuween Hill Chambered Cairn, c. 3000 BC

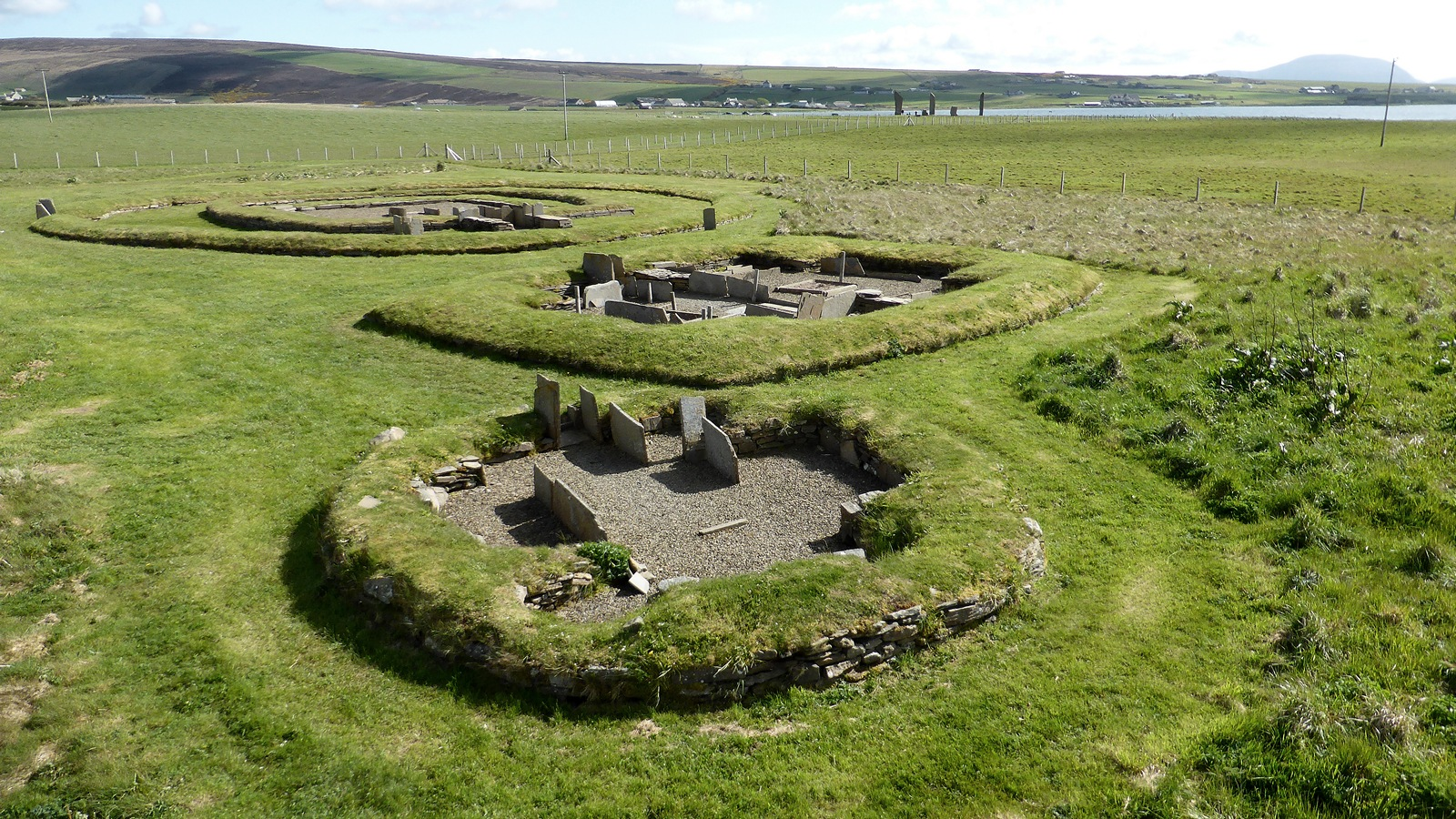
Barnhouse Settlement

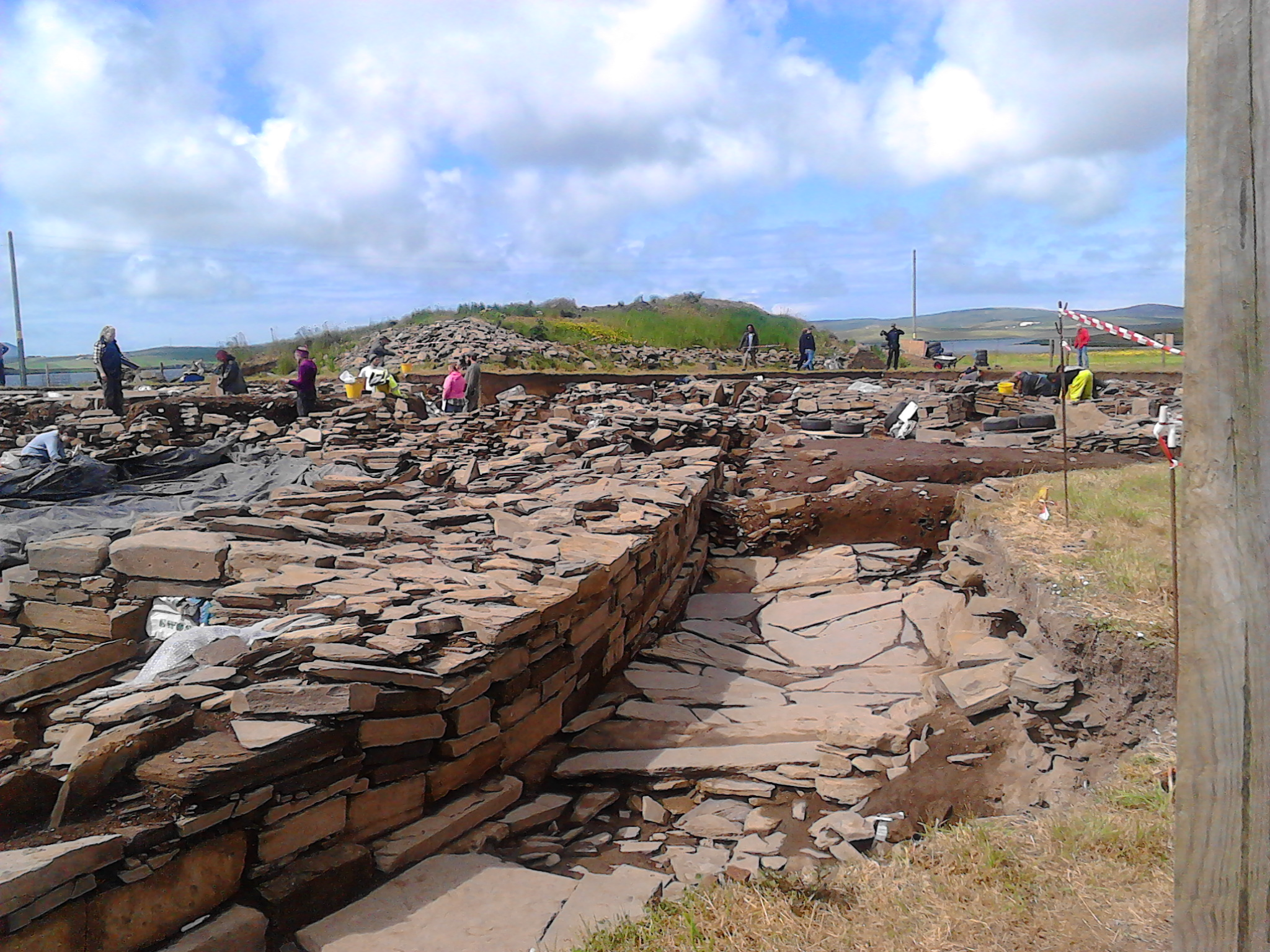
Ness of Brodgar, 3300-2800 BC

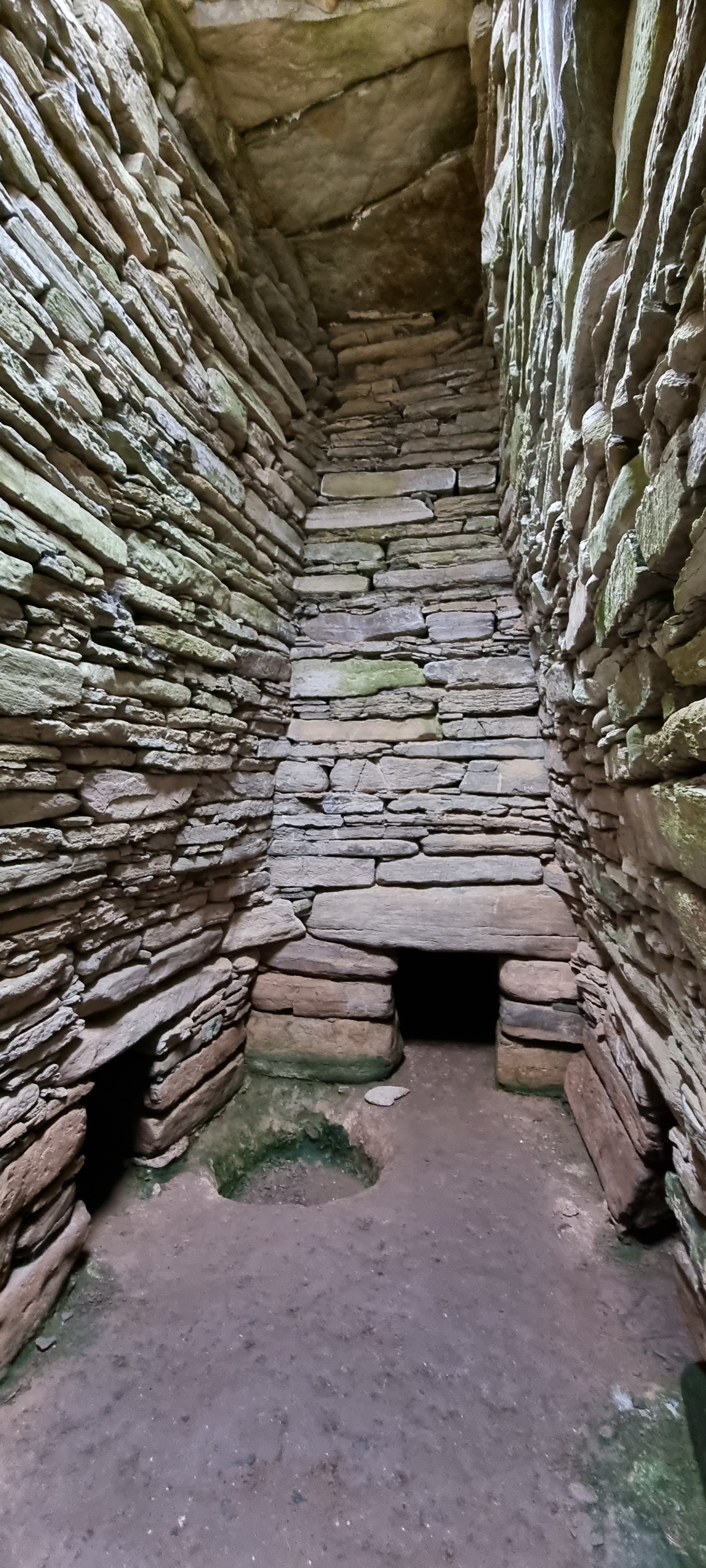
Quoyness chambered cairn

== Bronze Age ==
The cairns and megalithic monuments continued into the Bronze Age, though there was a decline in both the building of large new structures and the total area under cultivation.

The Clava cairns and standing stones near Inverness show complex geometries and astronomical alignments, with smaller, perhaps individual, tombs instead of the communal Neolithic tombs.

Mummies dating from 1600 to 1300 BC have been discovered at Cladh Hallan on South Uist.

Hill forts were introduced, such as Eildon Hill near Melrose in the Scottish Borders, which goes back to around 1000 BC and which accommodated several hundred houses on a fortified hilltop. Excavation at Edinburgh Castle found late Bronze Age material from about 850 BC.

=== Gallery ===
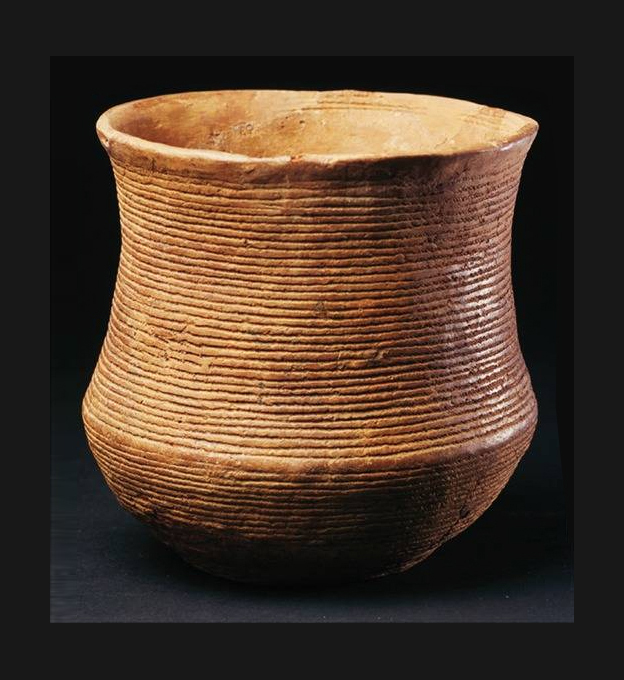
All-over corded beaker, Bell Beaker culture

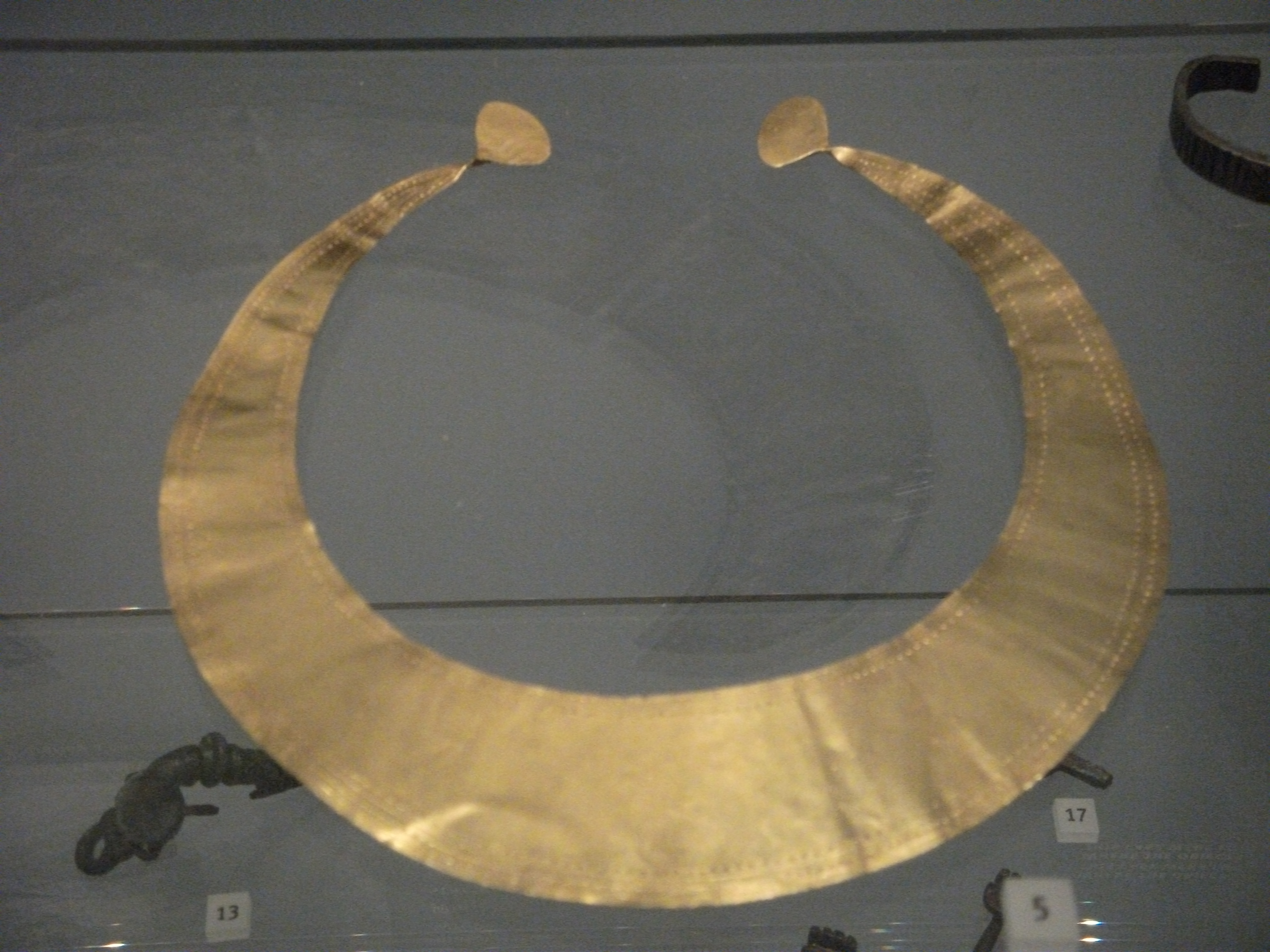
Gold lunula, Lanarkshire, 2300-2000 BC

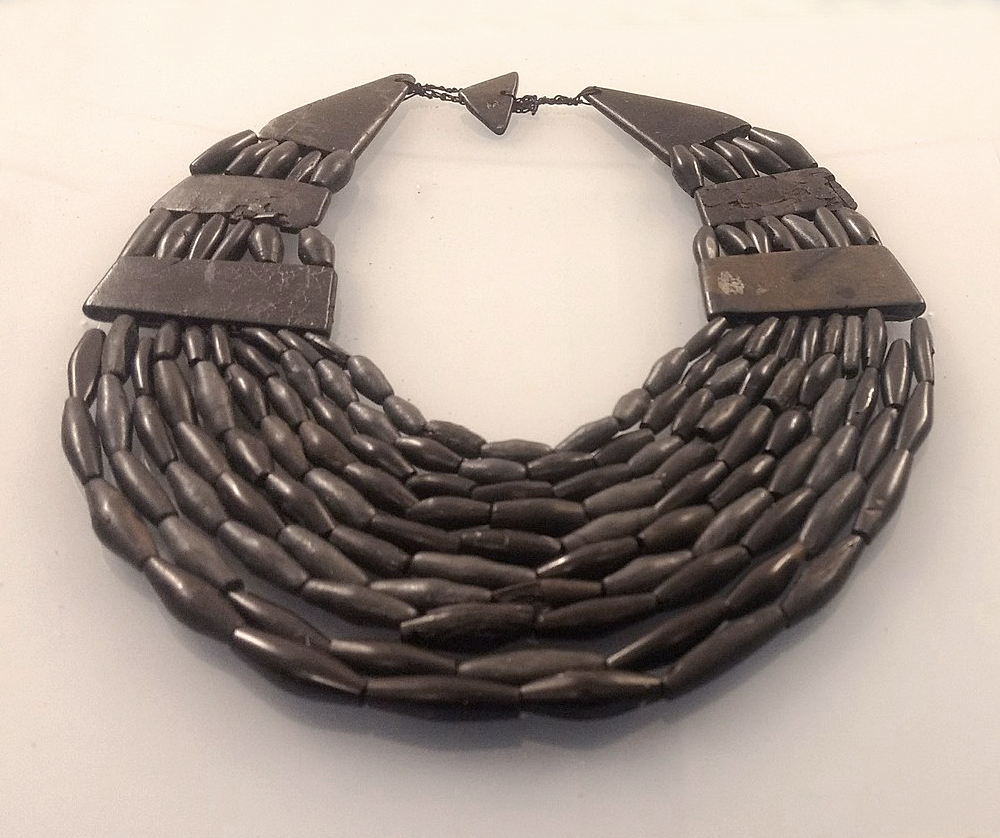
Jet necklace, c. 2140-1900 BC

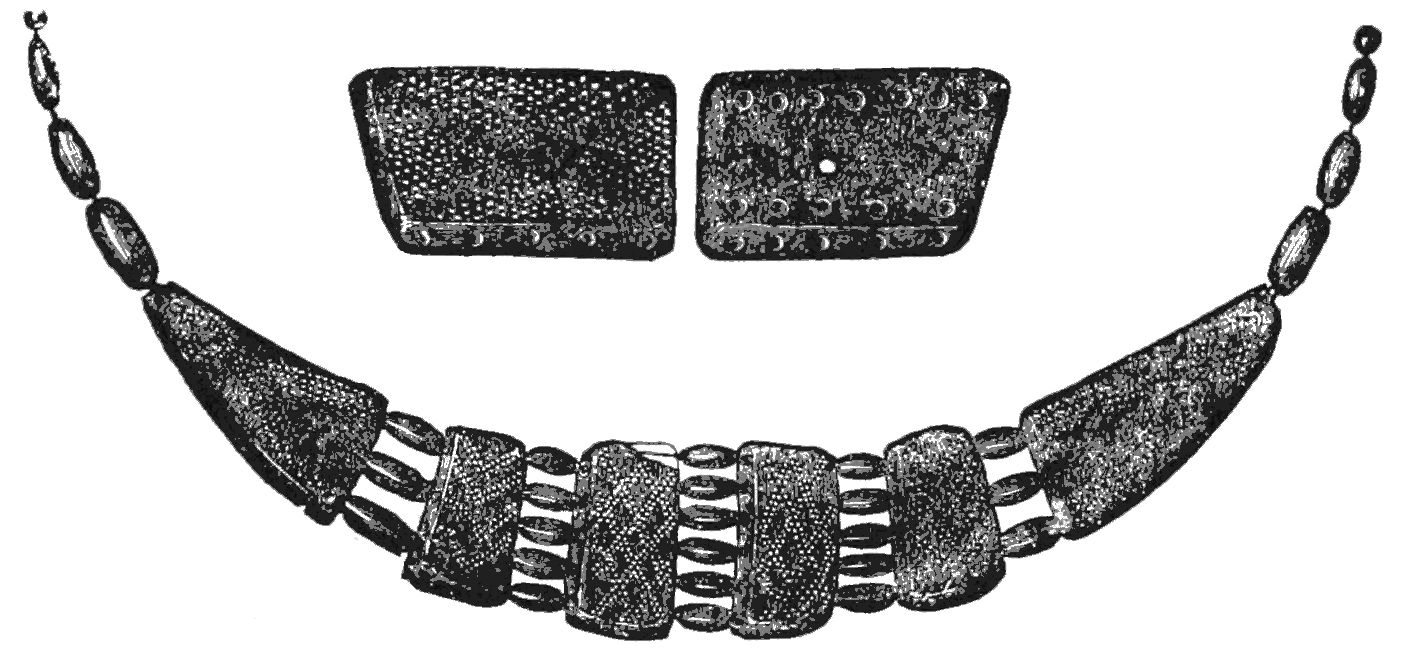
Jet necklace with geometric decoration

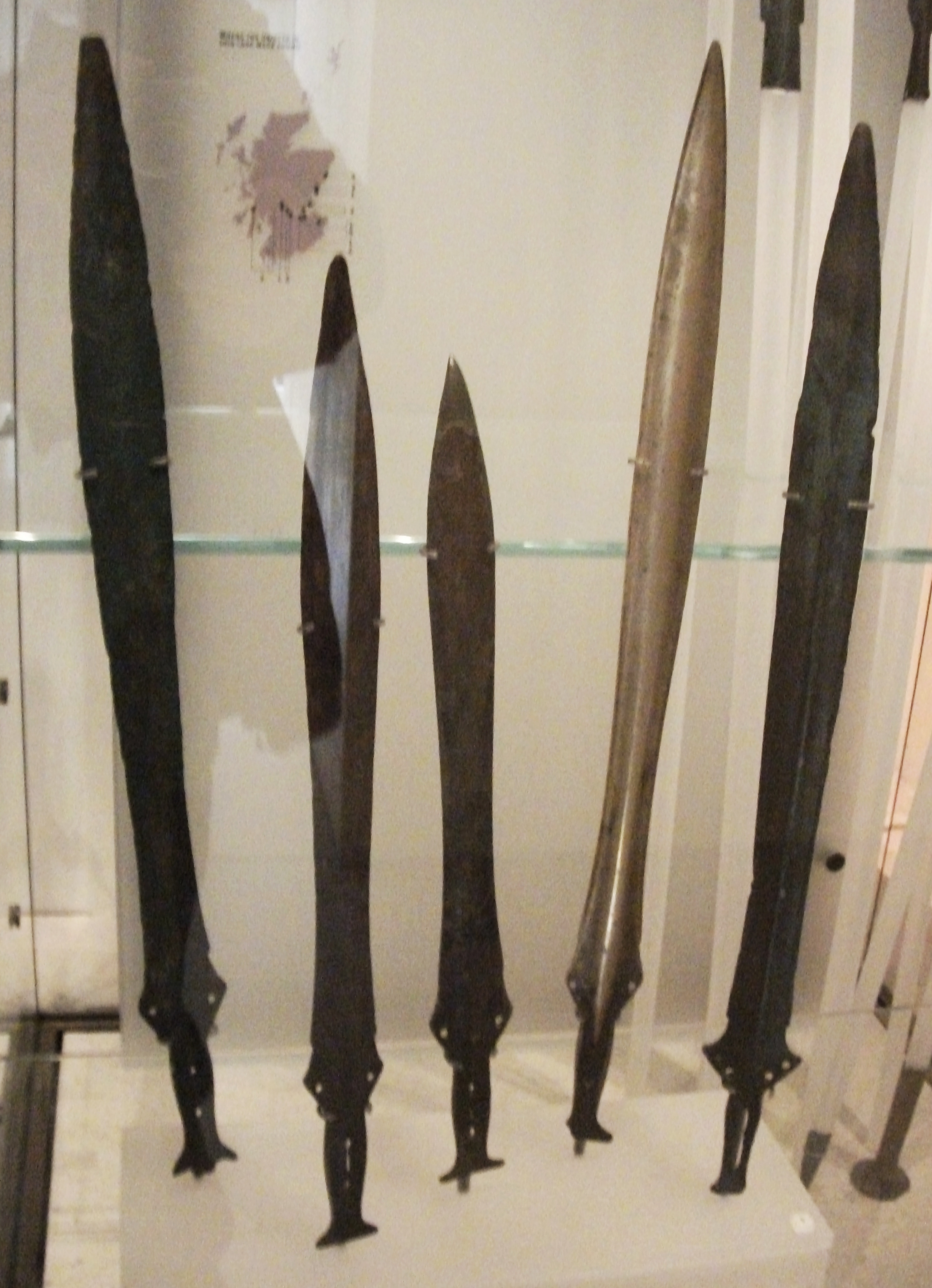
Bronze swords, c. 1000 BC

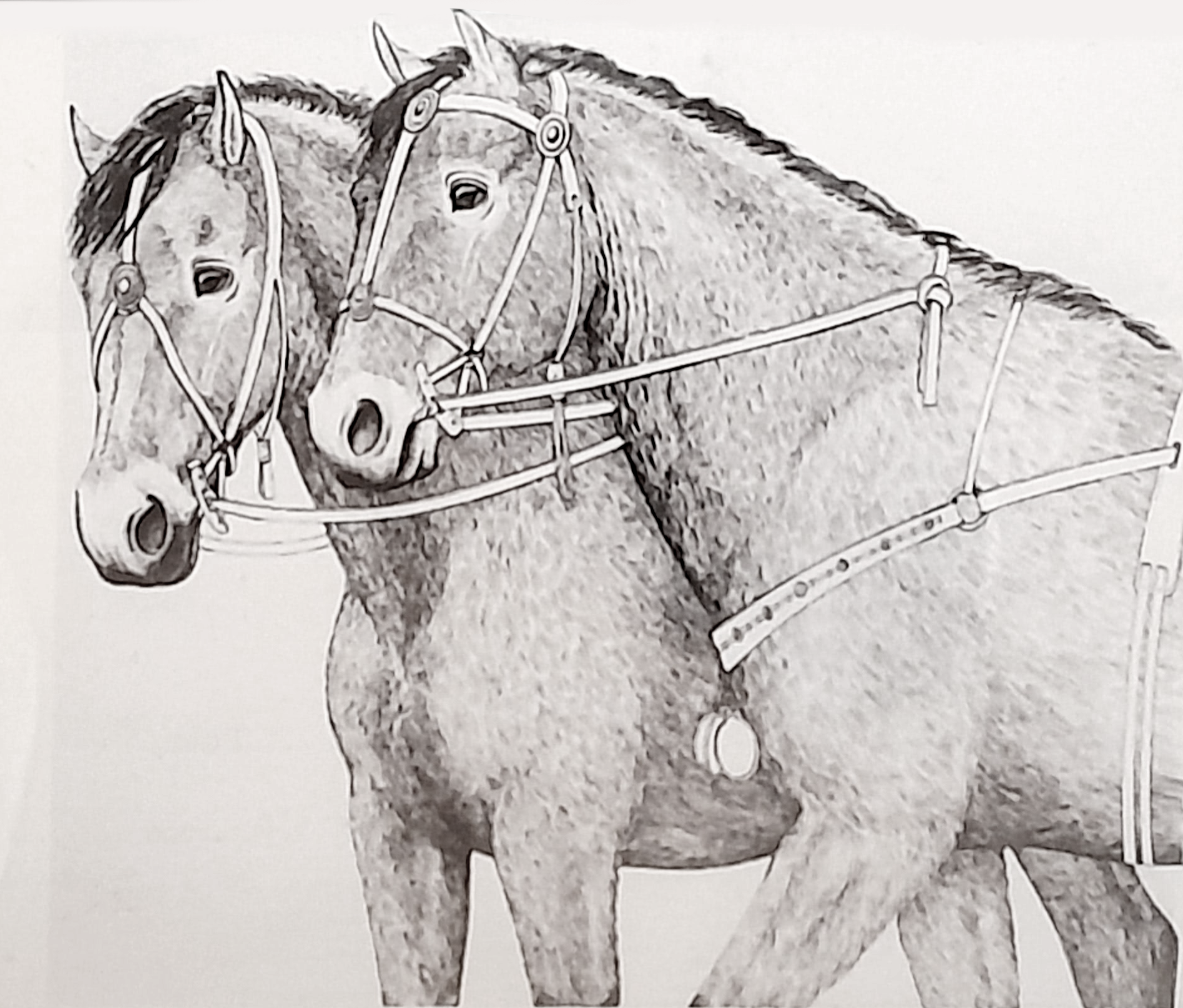
Bronze Age horse harness

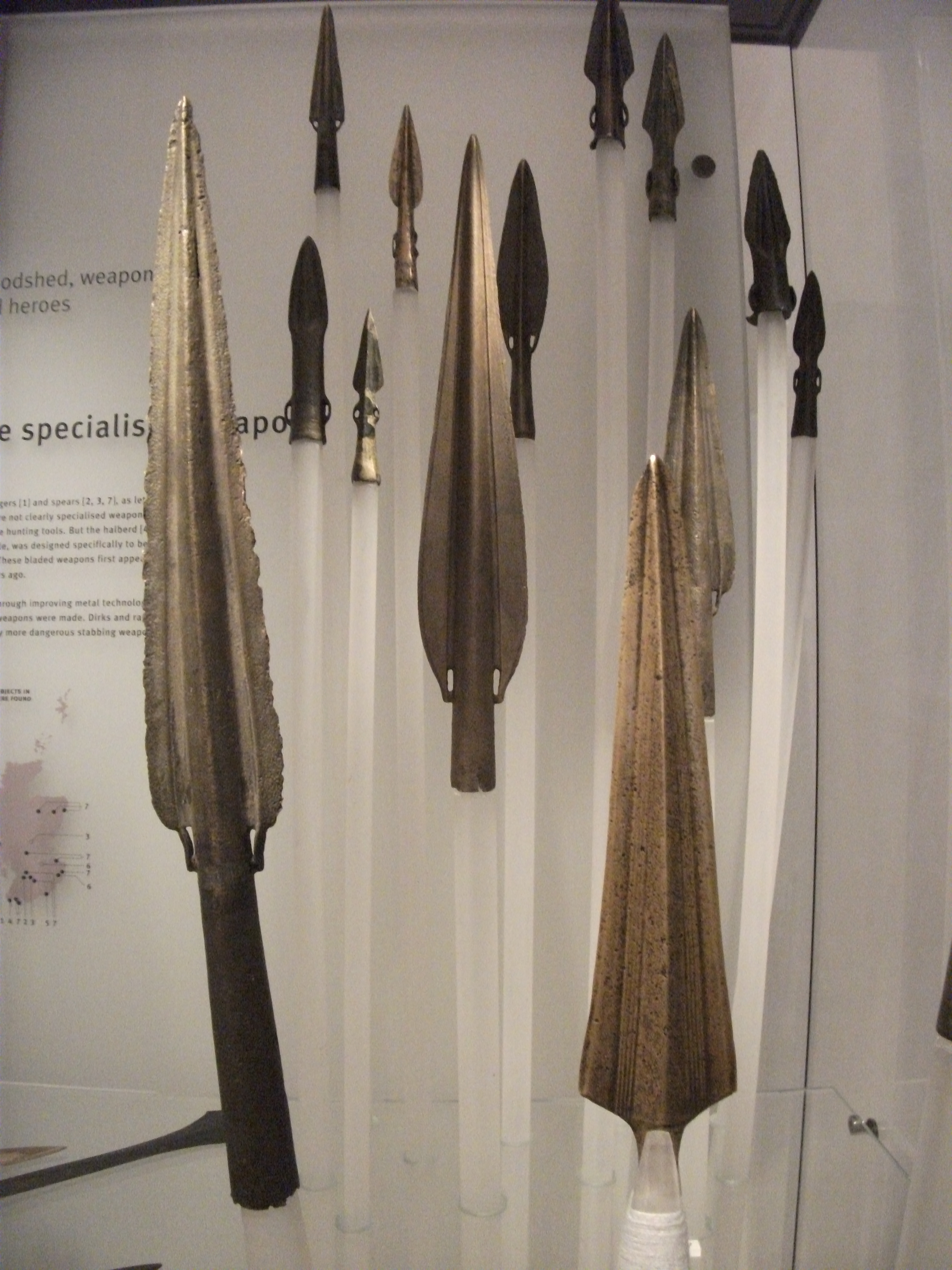
Bronze spearheads

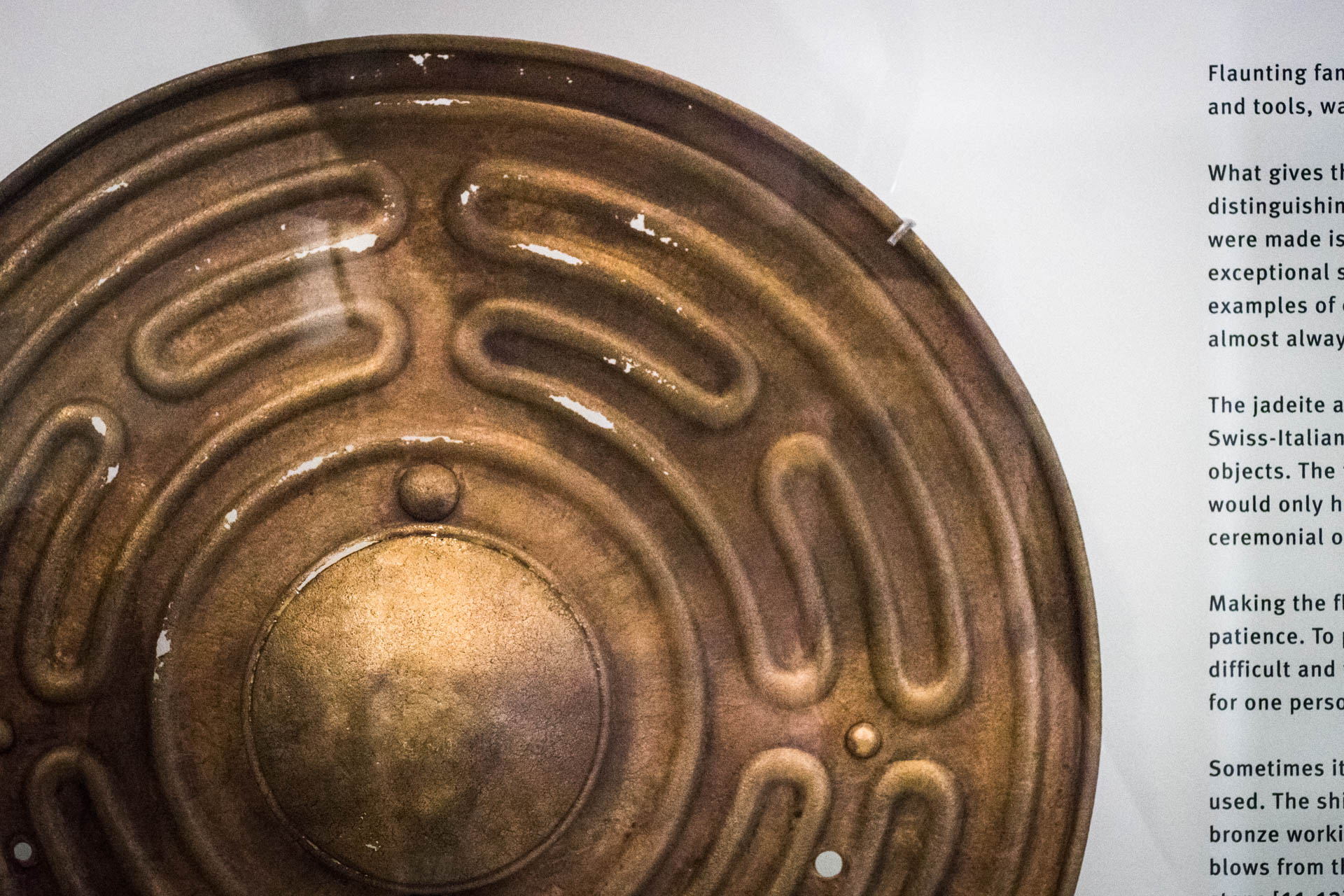
Bronze shield

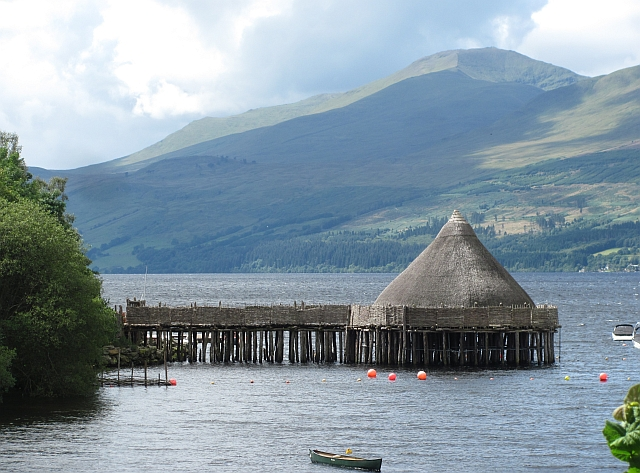
Reconstructed Crannog at Loch Tay

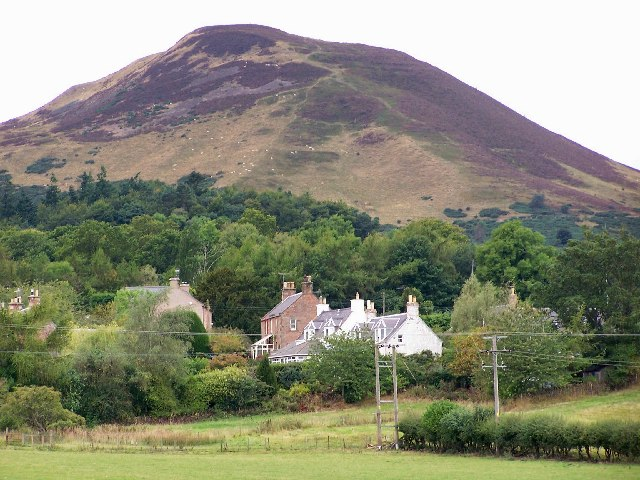
Eildon Hill

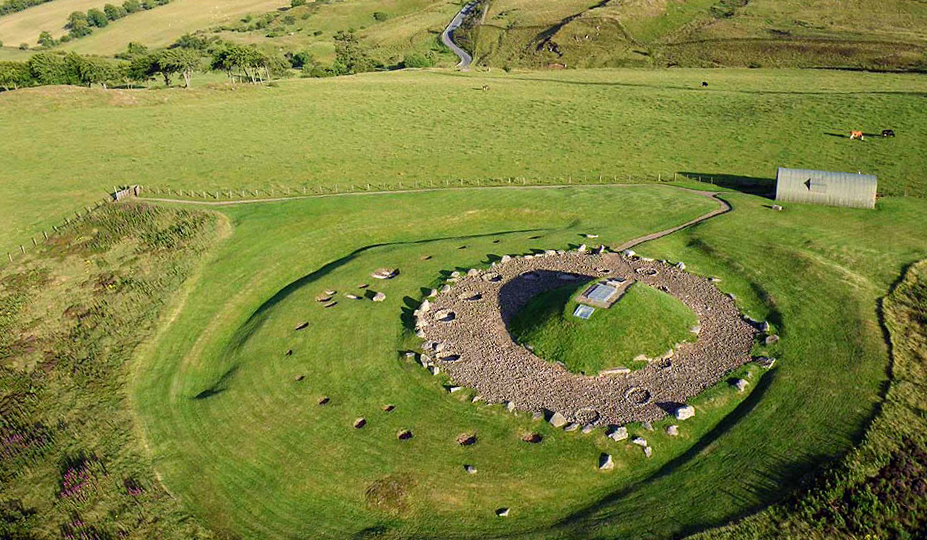
Cairnpapple Hill burial and ritual site

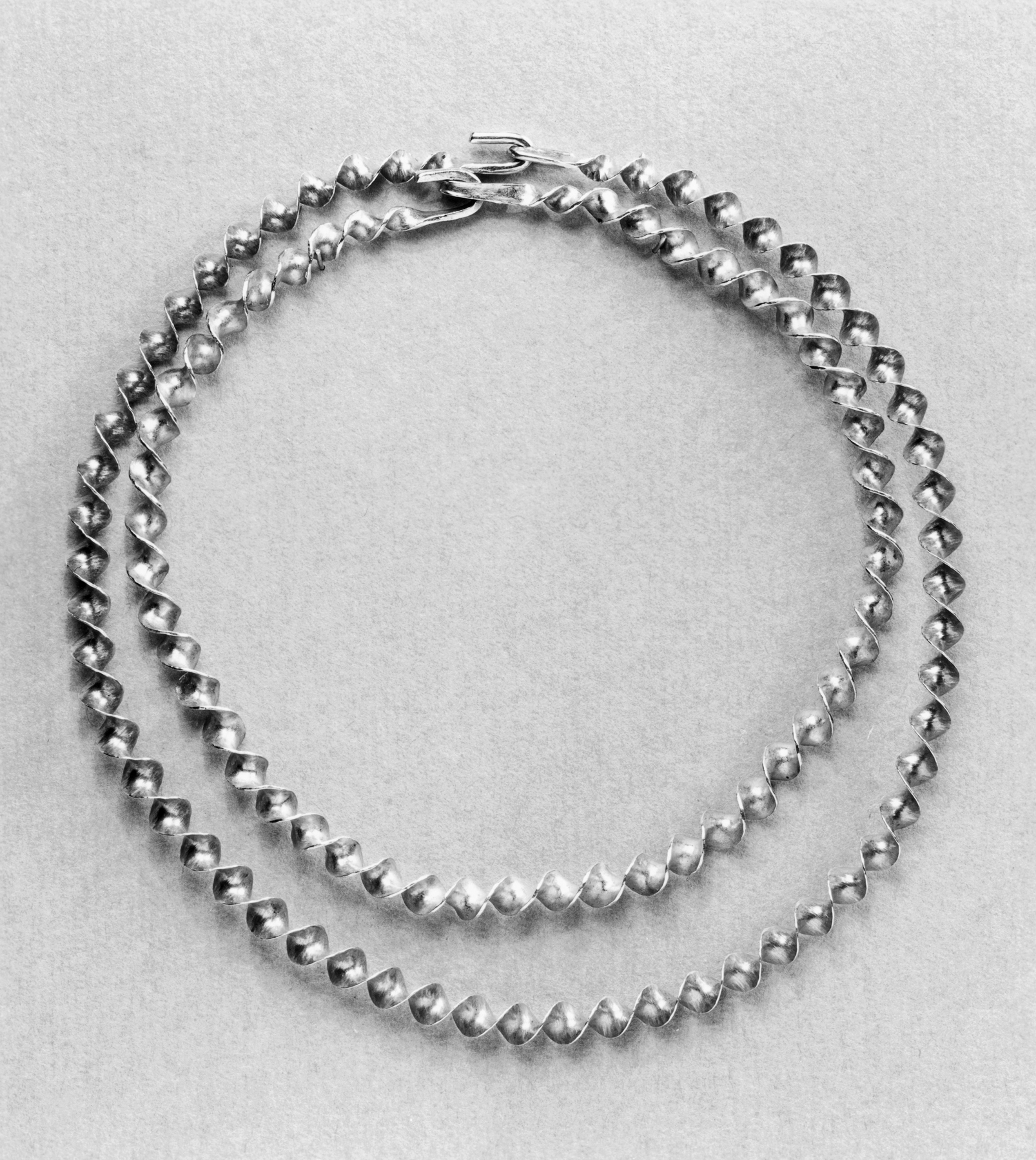
Gold armlet and neck torc, c. 1000 BC

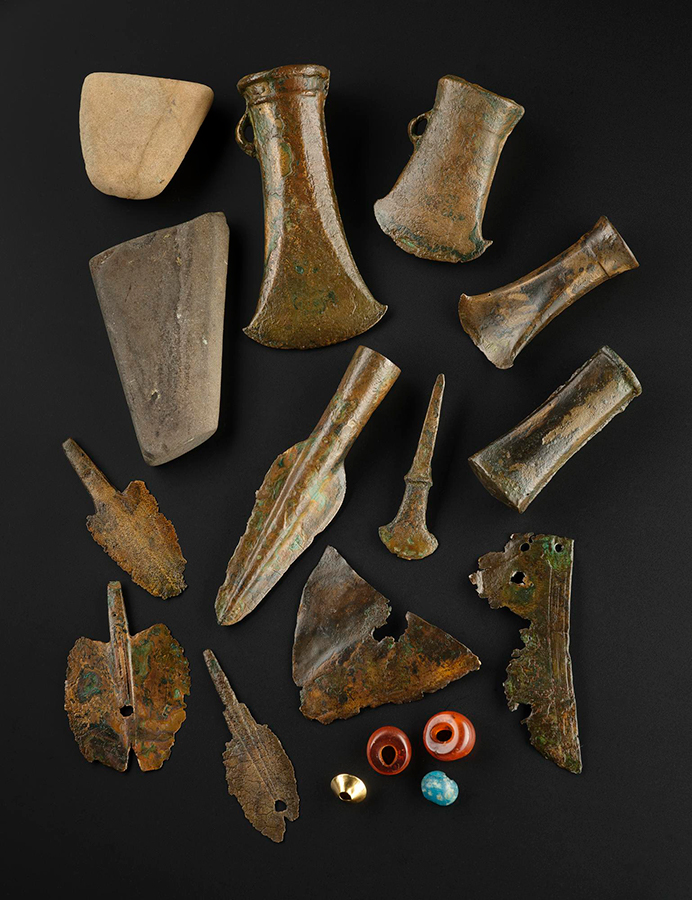
Adabrock Hoard, Isle of Lewis, c. 1000 BC

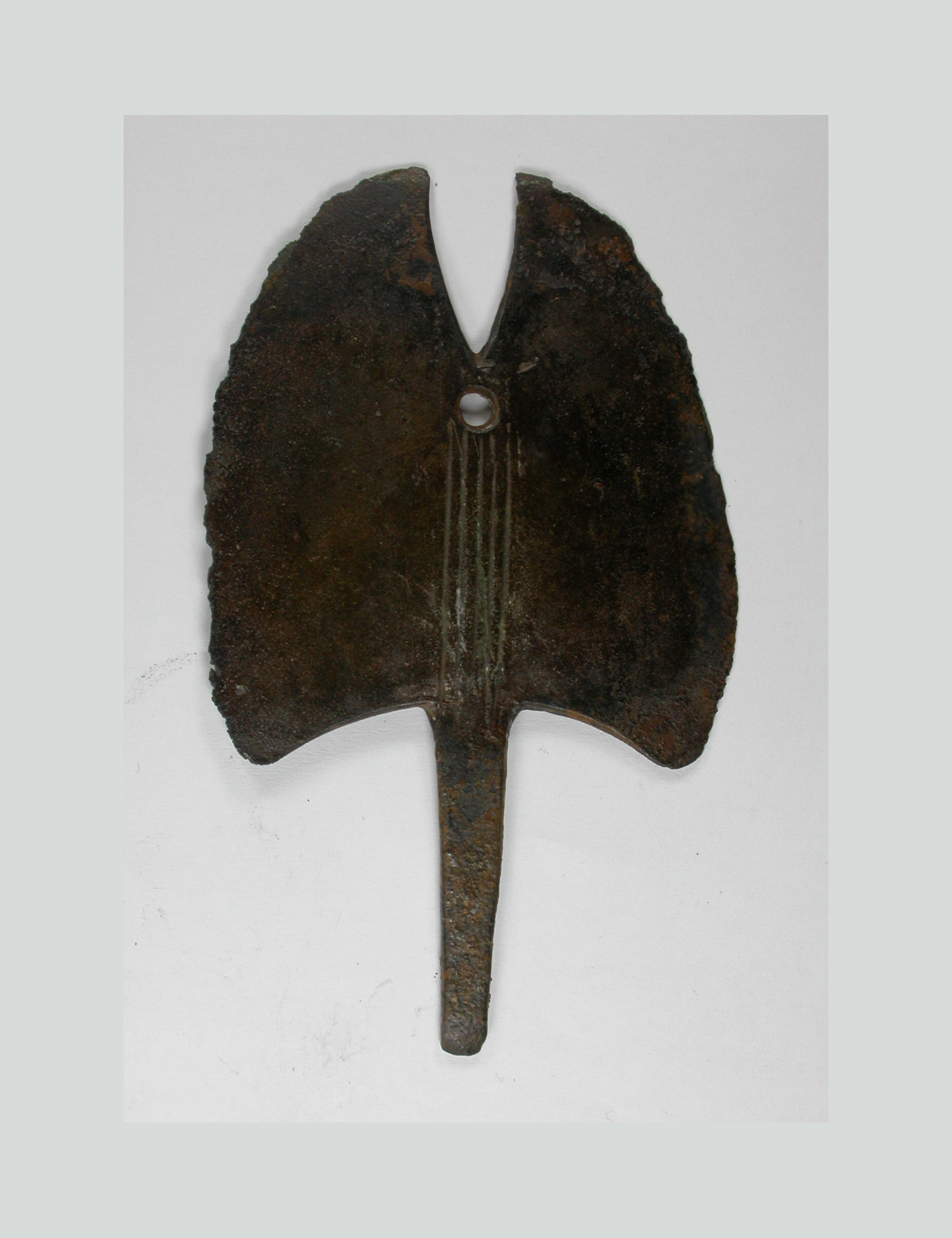
Bronze razor, c. 900 BC

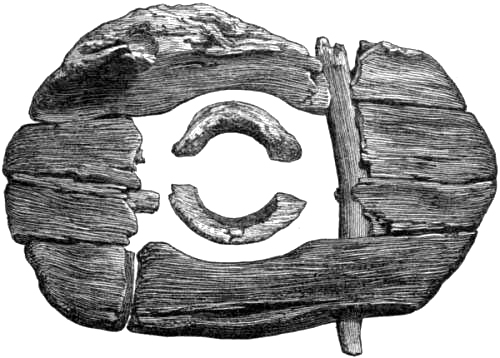
Wooden wheel remains, Blair Drummond, 1260-810 BC

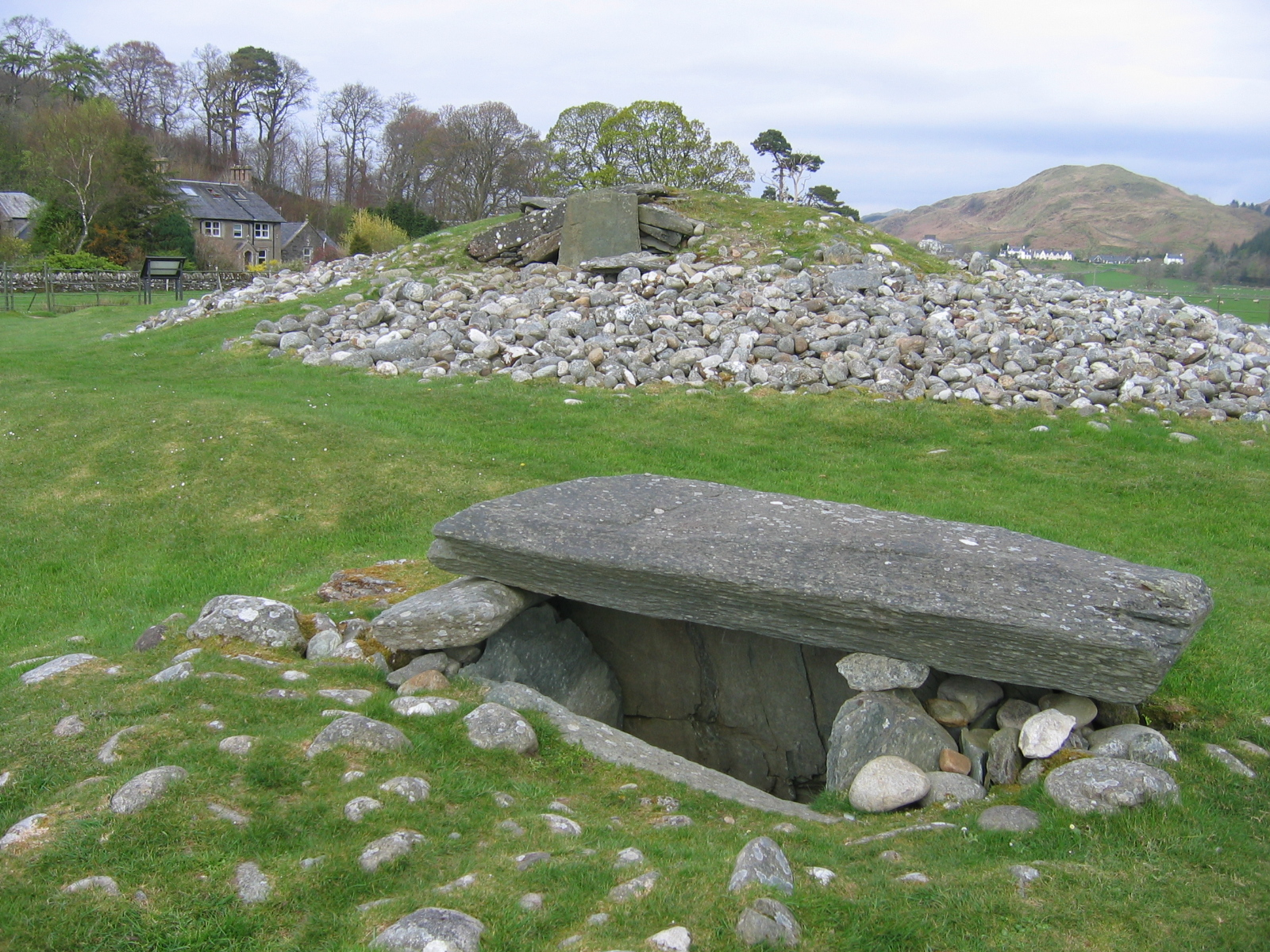
Stone cist grave

== Iron Age ==
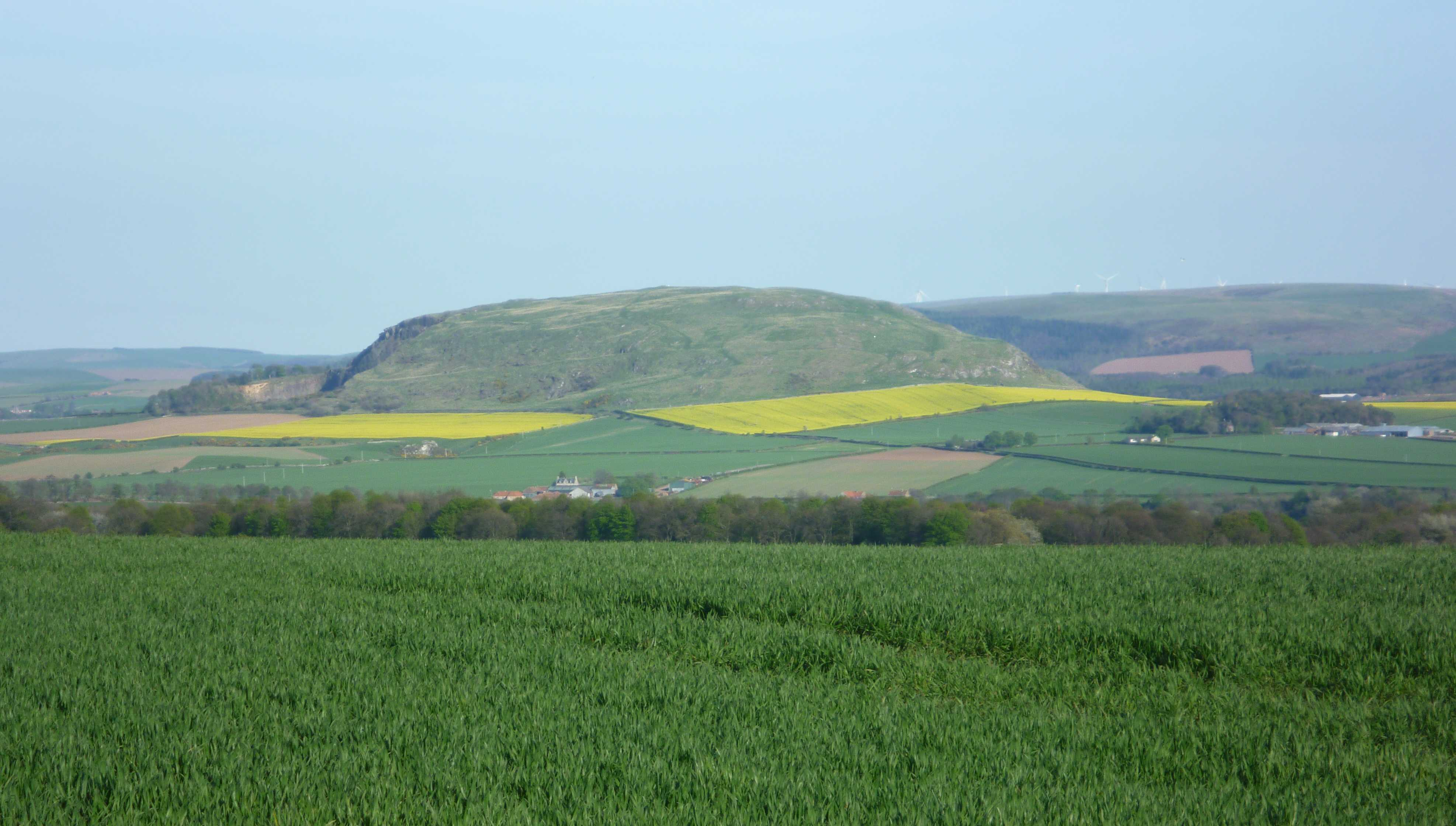
Traprain Law, East Lothian

From around 700 BC and extending into Roman times, the Iron Age was an age of forts and defended farmsteads, which support the image of quarrelsome tribes and petty kingdoms recorded by the Romans. Evidence that at times occupants neglected the defences might suggest that symbolic power was as significant as warfare.

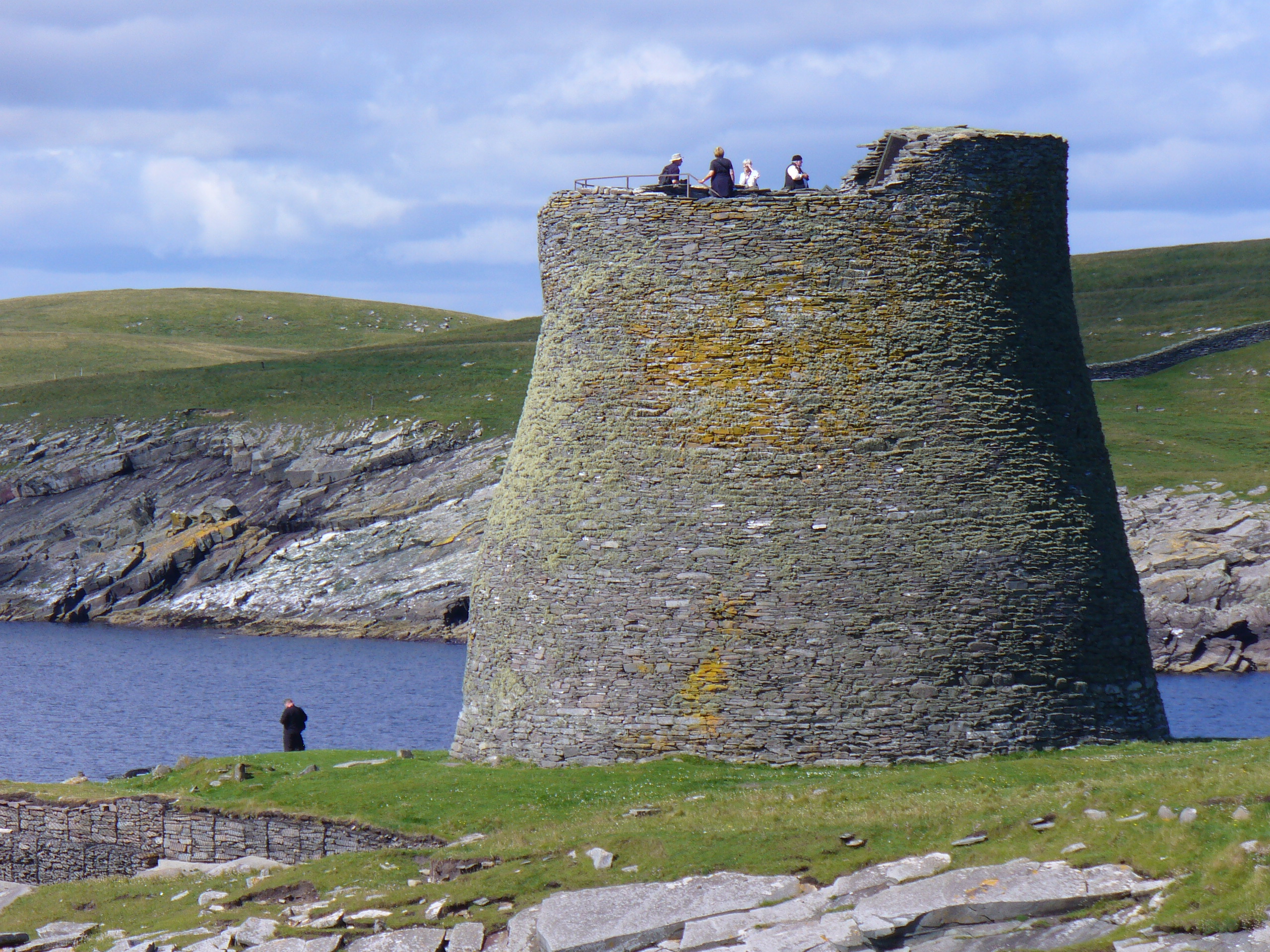
Broch of Mousa, c. 300 BC

Brythonic (or "Pritennic") Celtic culture and language spread into southern Scotland at some time after the 8th century BC, possibly through cultural contact rather than mass invasion, and systems of kingdoms developed.

Larger fortified settlements expanded, such as the Votadini stronghold of Traprain Law, East Lothian, which was the size of a town. Huge numbers of small duns, hill forts and ring forts were built on any suitable crag or hillock. The spectacular brochs were built, most impressively the nearly complete Mousa Broch, Shetland. Many Souterrain underground passageways were constructed, though their purpose is obscure. Island settlements linked with land by a causeway, the crannogs, became common; it is thought that their function was defensive.

=== Gallery ===
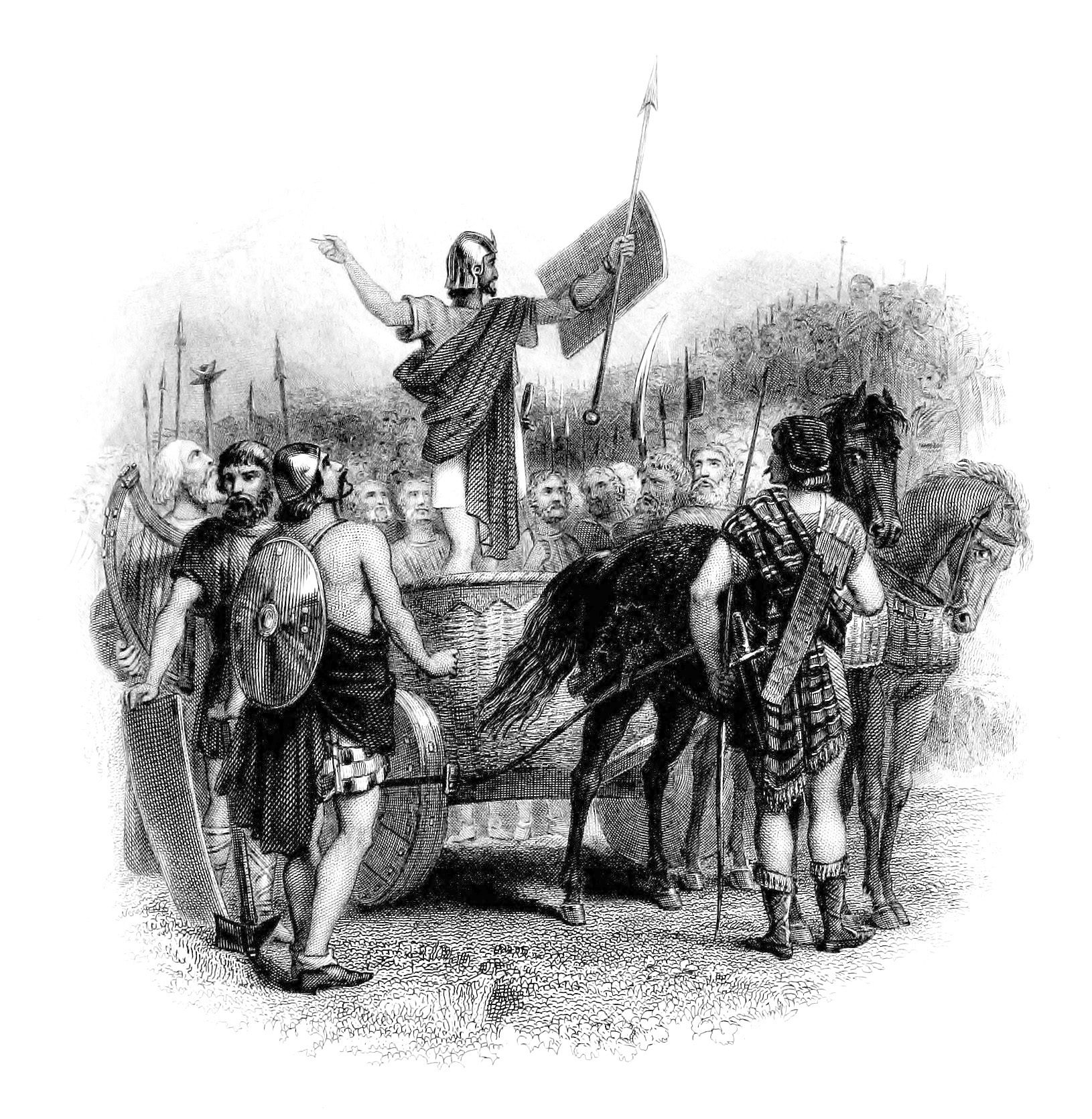
Illustration of Caledonian king Calgacus

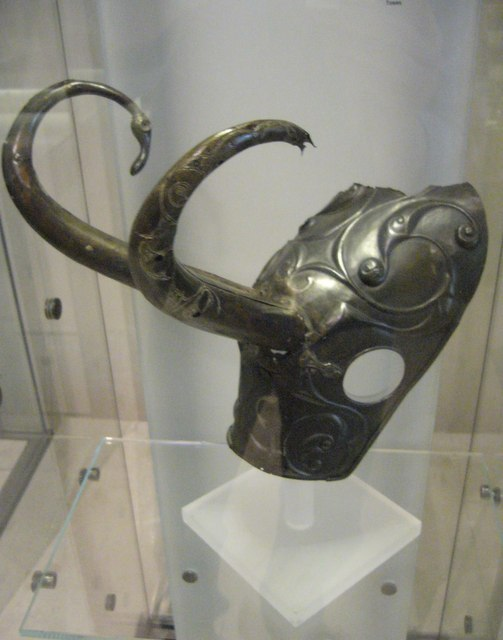
Horse helmet, 300-200 BC.

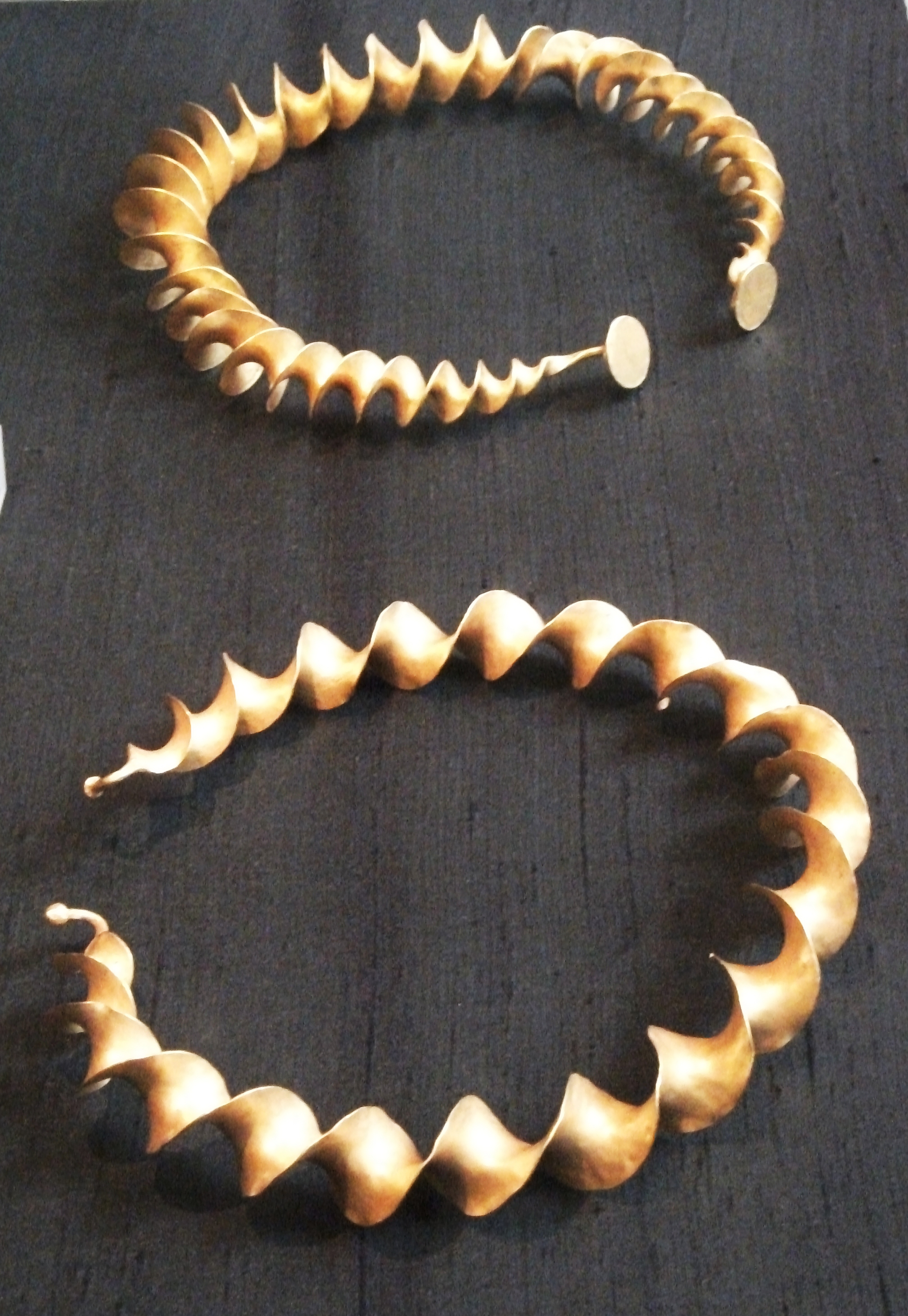
Gold torcs, Stirling hoard, 300-100 BC

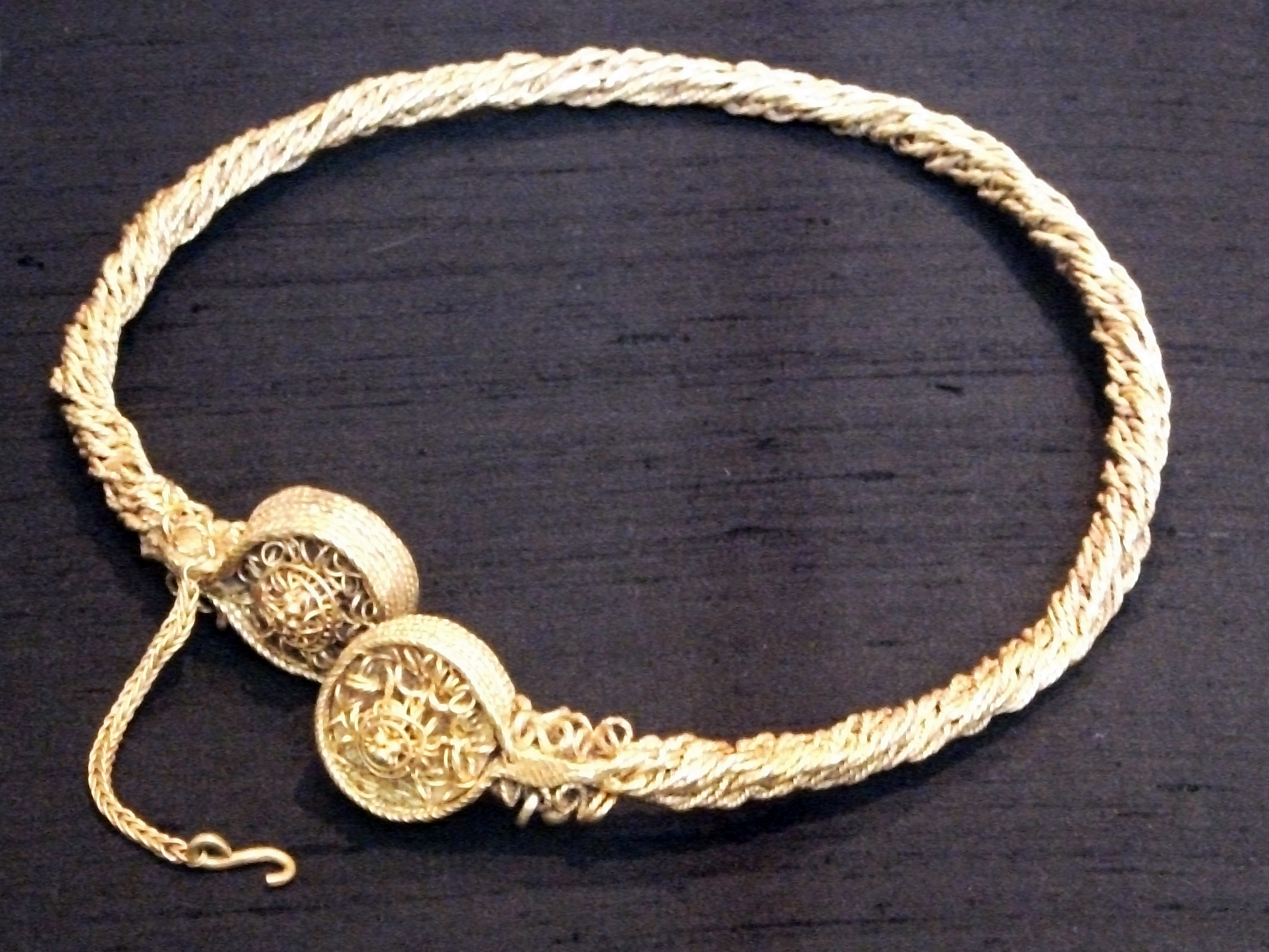
Stirling hoard gold torc, 300-100 BC

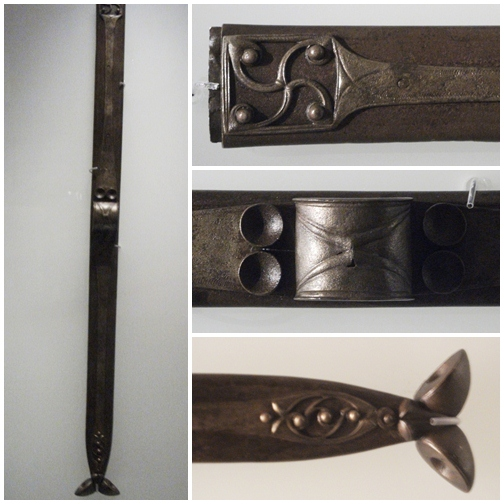
Scabbard, c. 1st century AD

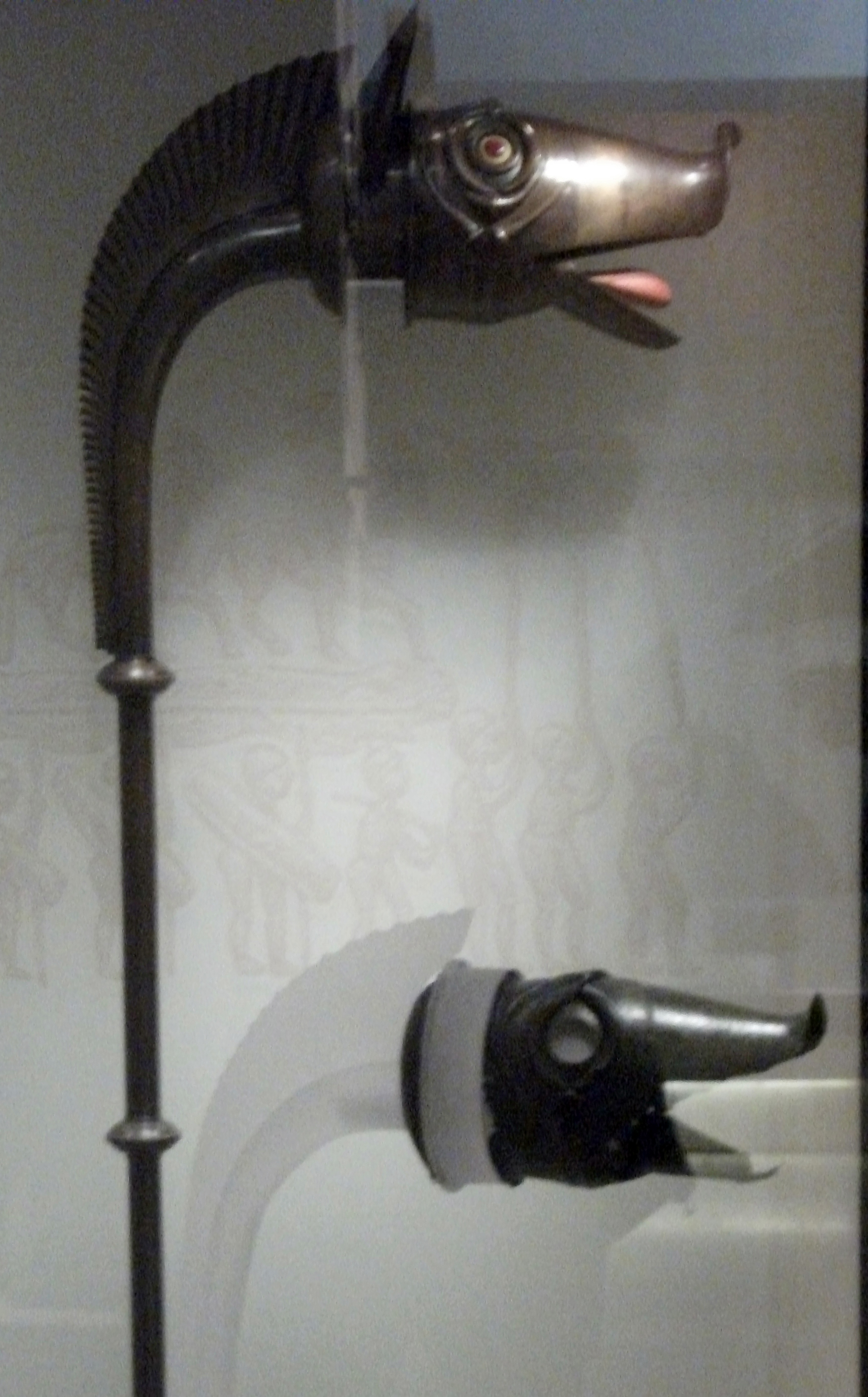
Deskford carnyx & reconstruction.

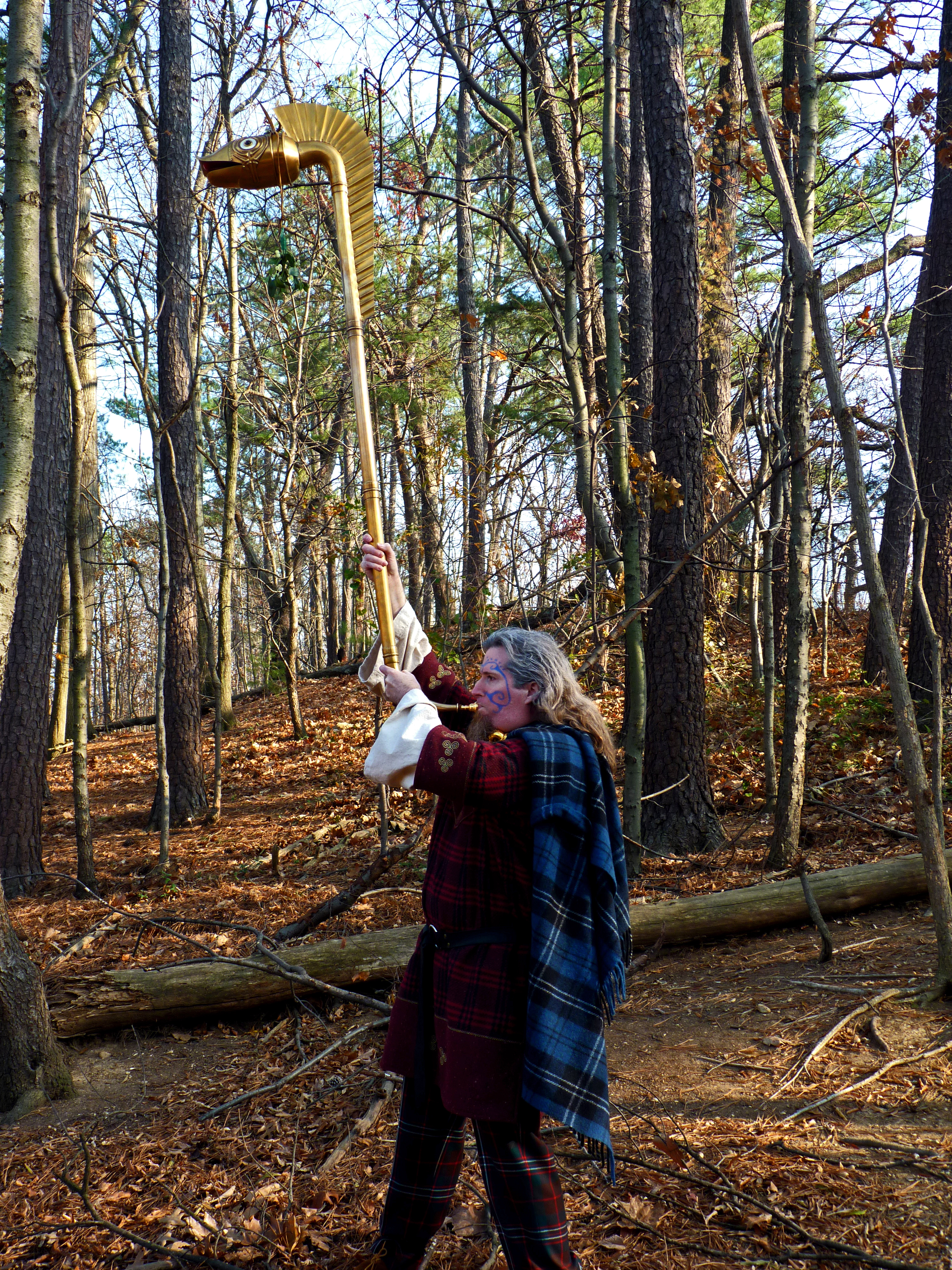
Carnyx reconstruction

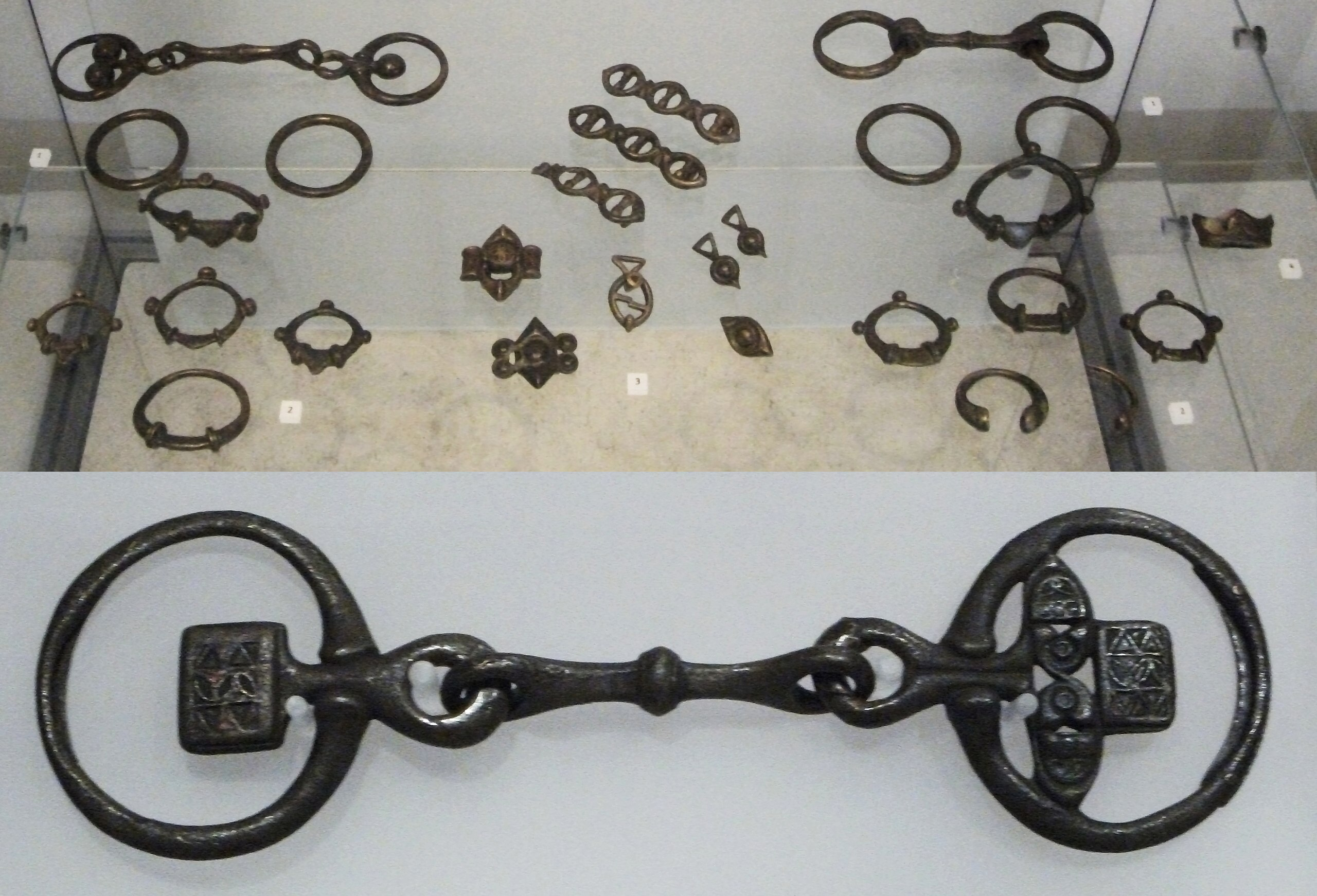
Horse harness, Middlebie Hoard, 1st-2nd century AD.

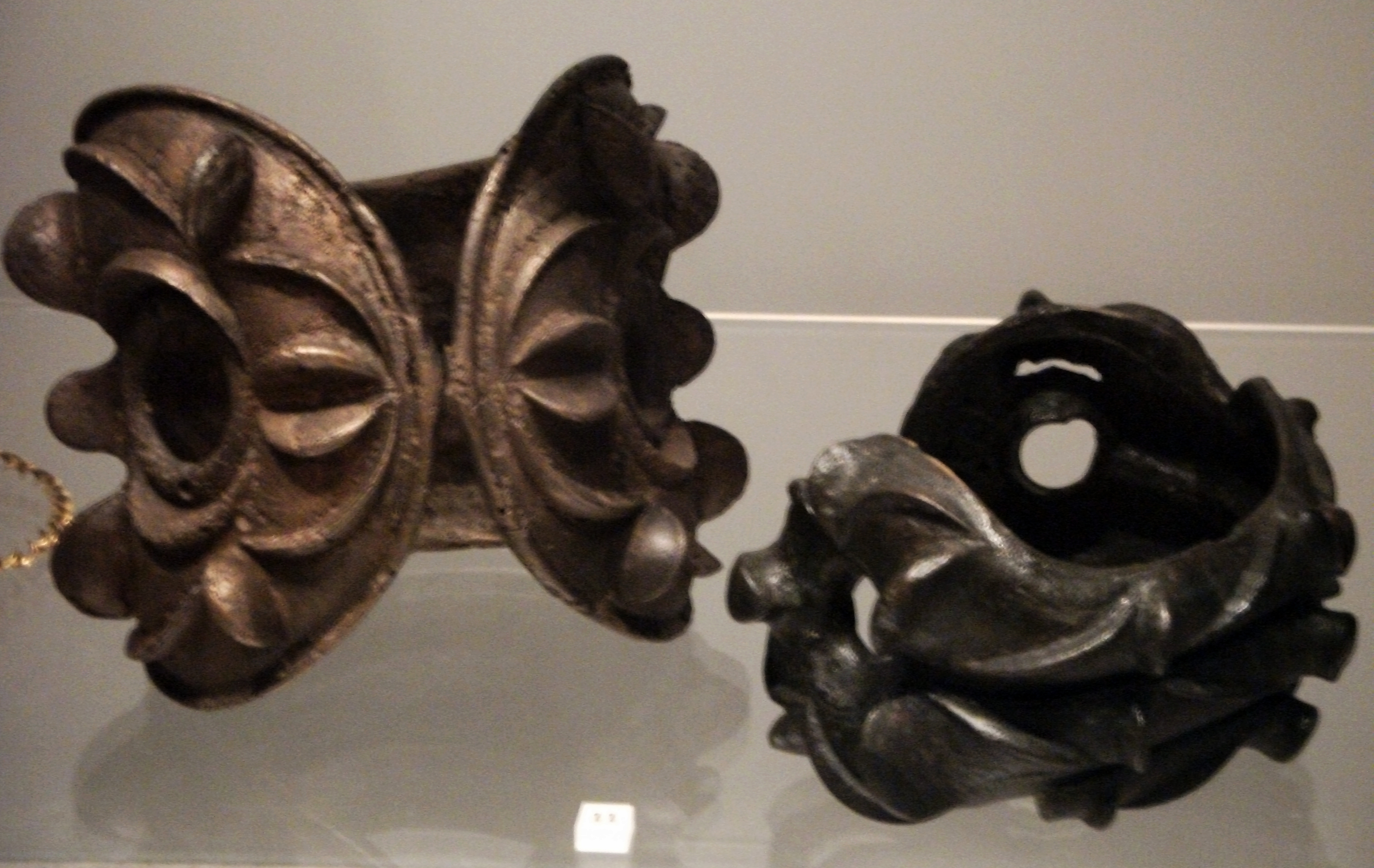
Bronze bracelets, c. 100 AD

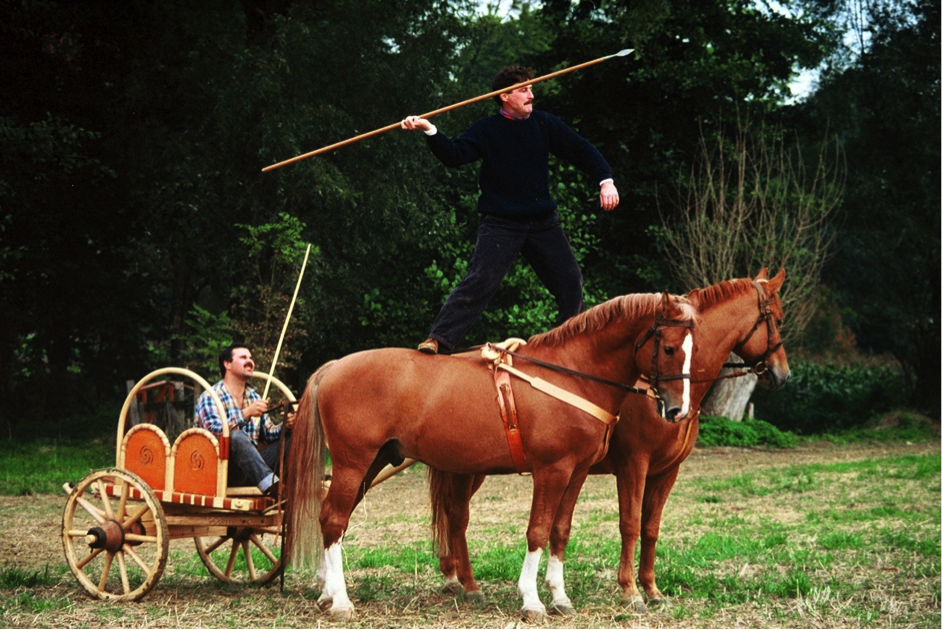
Reconstruction of an Iron Age chariot.

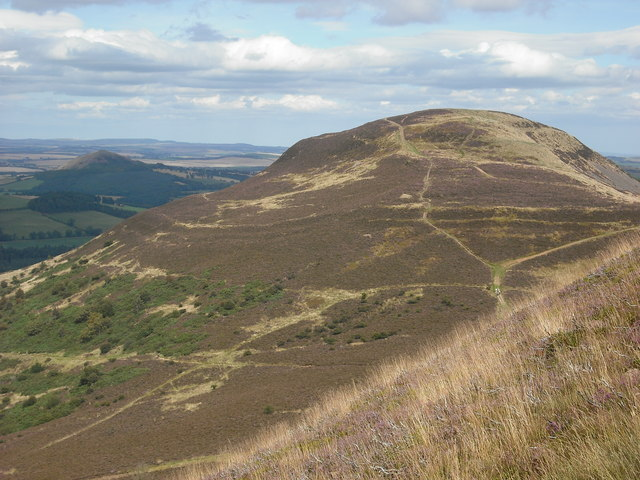
Eildon Hill North hillfort

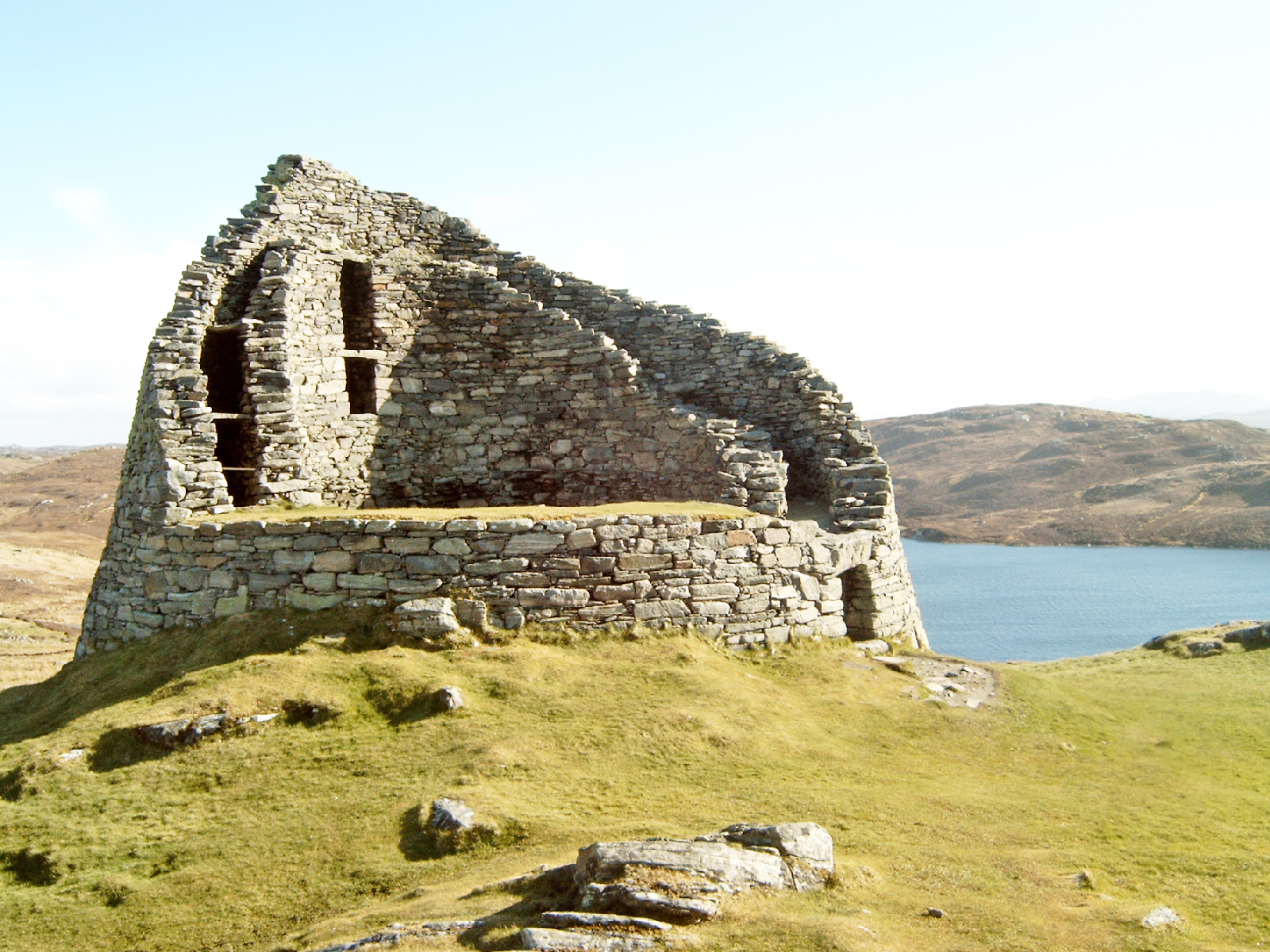
Ruined broch of Dun Carloway

== See also ==
- Timeline of prehistoric Scotland
- Prehistoric Orkney
- Prehistoric Britain
- List of prehistoric structures in Great Britain
- Early history of Ireland
- Genetic history of the British Isles
