= Eilean Dòmhnuill =

Island in the Outer Hebrides, Scotland

Eilean Domhnuill
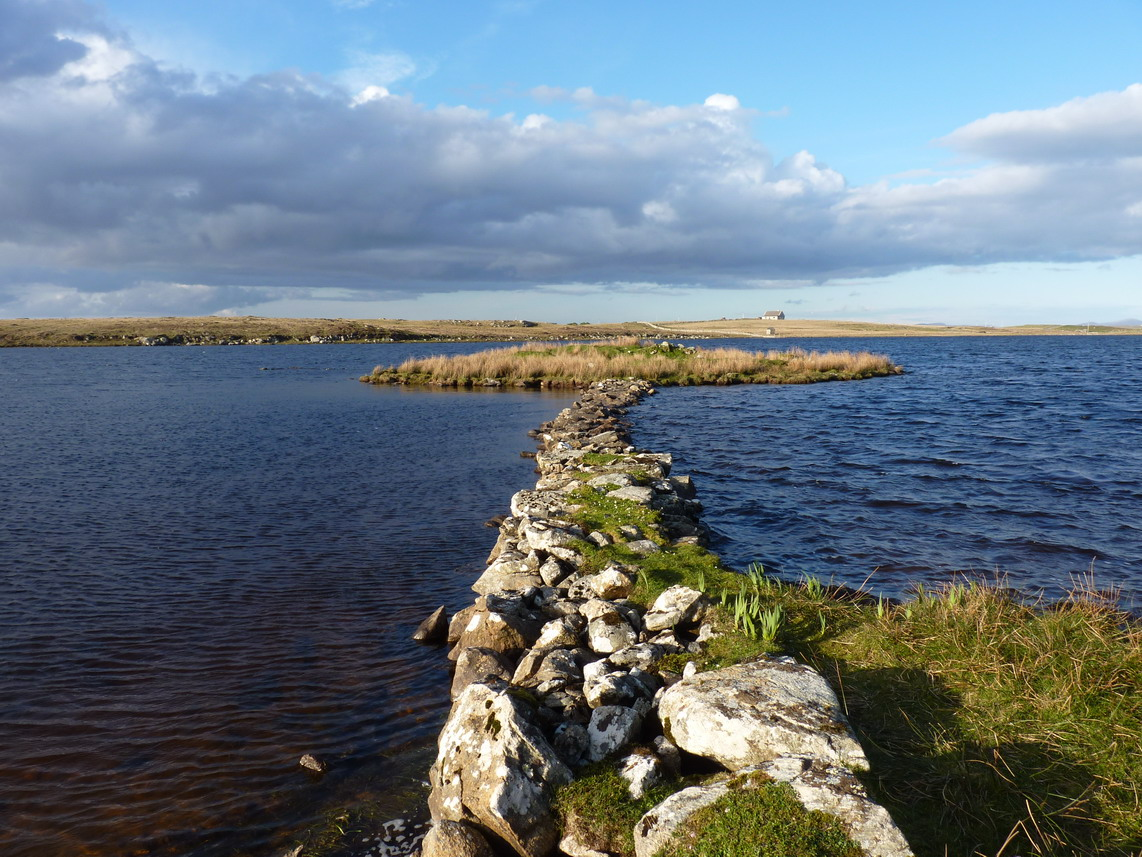
- The causeway to the crannog
- Interactive map of Eilean Domhnuill
- 57°39′00″N 7°27′19″W
- Type: Crannog
- Location: Scotland, United Kingdom

History
- Built: c. 3000 BC

Ian Armit identifies the islet of Eilean Dòmhnuill (Scottish Gaelic: Eilean Dòmhnaill, Scottish Gaelic pronunciation: [elan ˈt̪õː.ɪʎ], "The Isle of Donald"), Loch Olabhat, on North Uist, Scotland, as what may be the earliest crannog. Unstan ware pottery found there suggests a Neolithic period date of 3200–2800 BC. A surrounding timber screen and the turf-walled houses seem to have been repeatedly taken down and rebuilt, and in the final phase two oblong stone-footed structures bear a resemblance to Knap of Howar on Papa Westray, Orkney.

== See also ==
- Prehistoric Scotland
