= Hampton Down Stone Circle =

Bronze Age construction in Dorset, England

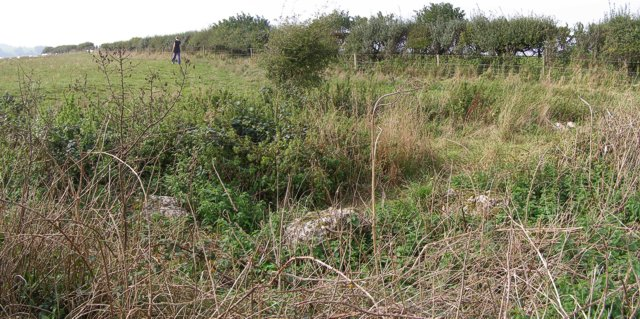
- The circle, situated amid overgrown bracken, in 2006

- Location within Dorset
- 50.676750°N 2.573132°W
- Type: Stone circle
- Periods: Neolithic / Bronze Age
- Region: Southwestern England

Scheduled monument
- Official name: Hampton stone circle
- Reference no.: 1002694

The Hampton Down Stone Circle is a stone circle located near to the village of Portesham in the south-western English county of Dorset. Archaeologists believe that it was likely erected during the Bronze Age. The Hampton Down ring is part of a tradition of stone circle construction that spread throughout much of Britain, Ireland, and Brittany during the Late Neolithic and Early Bronze Age, over a period between 3,300 and 900 BCE. The purpose of such monuments is unknown, although archaeologists speculate that they were likely religious sites, with the stones perhaps having supernatural associations for those who built the circles. However, it has been suggested that the site is not a stone circle at all, but is instead made up of kerbstones from a Bronze Age round barrow.

A number of stone circles were built in the area around modern Dorset, typically being constructed from sarsen stone and being smaller than those found elsewhere. The Hampton Down ring was erected on an open downland ridge overlooking the coast. It originally contained either eight or nine sarsen stones and had a diameter of 20 feet (6.5 metres) across with a track leading to it from the north. By 1908 the circle had been shifted east of its original position, with a hedge built across the site, and the number of stones increased to sixteen. By 1964 the number of stones had further increased to twenty-eight. In 1965, Geoffrey J. Wainwright oversaw an archaeological excavation which revealed the circle's original location and dimensions, after which it was reconstructed in its original location with the extraneous stones removed.

== Location ==
Positioned at the national grid reference 35960865, Hampton Down Stone Circle is located on the southern edge of an open downland ridge at a height of 680 feet above sea level. Located 1 kilometre (0.6 miles) north-west of Portesham on private land, it is positioned on the rim of Portesham Hill and overlooks the coast. Had the vegetation levels been low at the time of the circle's creation then it would have permitted extensive panoramic views of the coastline. The site is a scheduled monument, and thus accorded legal protection under the Ancient Monuments and Archaeological Areas Act 1979.

== Context ==
While the transition from the Early Neolithic to the Late Neolithic—which took place with the transition from the fourth to the third millennium BCE—witnessed much economic and technological continuity, it also saw a considerable change in the style of monuments erected, particularly in what is now southern and eastern England. By 3000 BCE, the long barrows, causewayed enclosures, and cursuses which had predominated in the Early Neolithic had ceased being built, and were instead replaced by circular monuments of various kinds. These include earthen henges, timber circles, and stone circles. These latter circles are found in most areas of Britain where stone is available, with the exception of the island's south-eastern corner. They are most densely concentrated in south-western Britain and on the north-eastern horn of Scotland, near Aberdeen. The tradition of their construction may have lasted for 2,400 years, from 3300 to 900 BCE, with the major phase of building taking place between 3000 and 1,300 BCE.

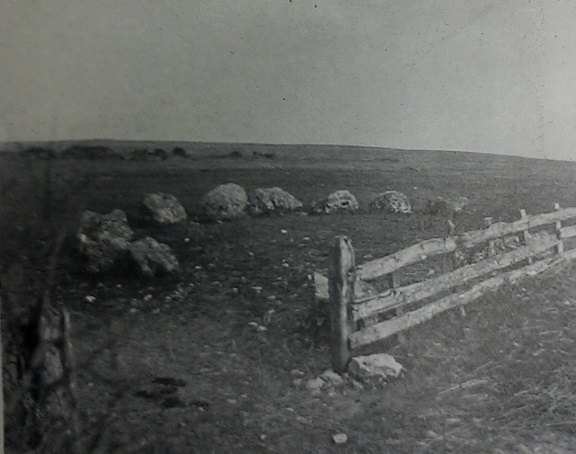
A photograph of the site as it existed in the first decade of the 20th century. Taken during a visit to the site by the Dorset Natural History and Archaeological Society.

These stone circles typically show very little evidence of human visitation during the period immediately following their creation. This suggests that they were not sites used for rituals that left archaeologically visible evidence, and may have been deliberately left as "silent and empty monuments". The archaeologist Mike Parker Pearson suggested that in Neolithic Britain, stone was associated with the dead and wood with the living. Other archaeologists have suggested that the stone might not represent ancestors, but rather other supernatural entities, such as deities.

The area of modern Dorset has only a "thin scatter" of stone circles, with nine possible examples known within its boundaries. The archaeologist John Gale described these as "a small but significant group" of such monuments, and all are located within five miles (eight kilometres) of the sea. All but one—Rempstone Stone Circle on the Isle of Purbeck—are located on the chalk hills west of Dorchester. The Dorset circles have a simplistic typology, being of comparatively small size, with none exceeding 28 metres (92 feet) in diameter. All are oval in shape, although perhaps have been altered from their original form. With the exception of the Rempstone circle, all consist of sarsen stone. Much of this may have been obtained from the Valley of Stones, a location at the foot of Crow Hill near to Littlebredy, which is located within the vicinity of many of these circles. With the exception of the circle at Litton Cheney, none display evidence of any outlying stones or earthworks around the stone circle.

The archaeologists Stuart and Cecily Piggott believed that the circles of Dorset were probably of Bronze Age origin, a view endorsed by the archaeologist Aubrey Burl, who noted that their distribution did not match that of any known Neolithic sites. It is possible that they were not all constructed around the same date, and the Piggotts suggested that while they may well be Early Bronze Age in date, it is also possible that "their use and possibly their construction may last into the Middle and even into the Late Bronze Age". Their nearest analogies are the circles found on Dartmoor and Exmoor to the west, and the Stanton Drew stone circles to the north. It is also possible that the stone circles were linked to a number of earthen henges erected in Dorset around the same period.

== Description ==
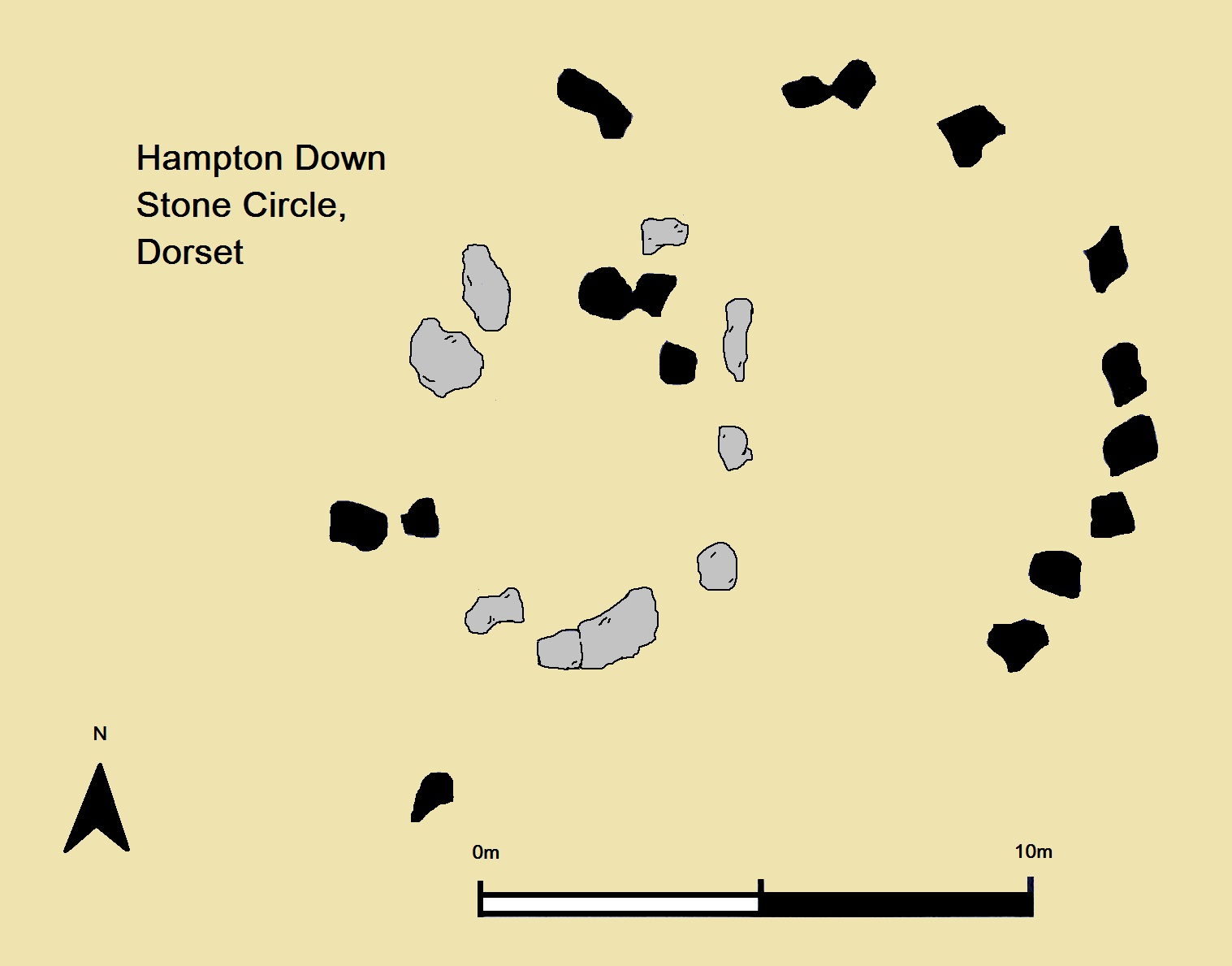
A plan of the Hampton Down Stone Circle. The grey stones mark the location of the original Bronze Age positioning; the black stones reflect the location of those prior to excavation in 1964.

Burl described the Hampton Down Stone Circle as a "megalithic chameleon". A photograph from 1908 showed sixteen stones as part of the monument, a number that was again recorded by the Piggotts in 1938. However, by 1964 twenty-eight stones were found to be part of the circle. As of 1939, a hedge and bank split the circle in two, from north-to-south, separating the three most westerly stones from the rest of the circle. Investigations revealed that when the field to the east of the hedge was cleared in 1964, a large number of stones had been found on the surface and had been moved to the site of the other stones. It is possible that these other stones had also once been part of a prehistoric monument, such as a long barrow or round barrow, which had once existed in the vicinity. The stones are sarsen.

Commenting on the site in 1939, the Piggotts opined that ten stones in the eastern half of the ring were likely in their original position. They expressed the view that "owing to [the stone's] rough cube-like shapes it is impossible to decide whether they are upright or recumbent". Based on what they believed to be the stones in their original position, they estimated the circle's original diameter at 35 feet (11–12 metres).

=== Excavation ===
In 1964 the stones in the circle were disturbed by agricultural activity. It was then decided that the site would be excavated, a project which was ordered by the Ministry of Public Building and Works and carried out in May 1965 under the directorship of Geoffrey J. Wainwright. The 28 stones were moved from the site using a crane to permit the archaeologists to excavate the area beneath them.

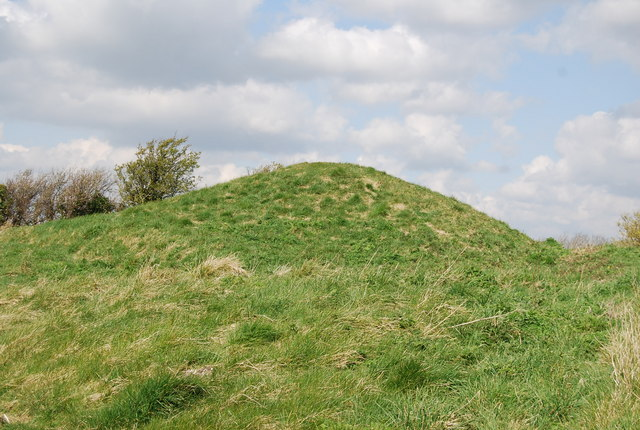
Burl proposed that the Hampton Down stones may not have been part of a stone circle but rather the kerbstones of a since-lost Bronze Age round barrow, like that pictured here at the Five Marys near Chaldon Herring.

The excavation revealed that the location of the stones was not their original prehistoric position. The original location of the circle was identified as existing a few feet to the west, under the adjacent hedge. The original circle had either eight or possibly nine sockets for stones and was oval shaped. The perimeter of the ring was defined by V-shaped ditches on its eastern and western perimeters. The maximum axis of the circle would have been approximately 20 feet (6.5 metres), making it considerably smaller than the size proposed by the Piggotts. There was a 4 feet (1.2 metre) wide track leading to the circle from the north, with Burl opining that "if this had been an avenue it was a very poor one". Three stake-holes were found at the western side of the circle, where it was joined by the track.

If used as a space for rituals, the Hampton Down circle would have only been able to accommodate a few individuals standing within it at any given time. It was also not the site of any cremation deposits, unlike some stone circles in Northern Britain. Burl suggested that the Hampton Down Stone Circle may never have been part of the prehistoric stone circle tradition, but that the stones were actually once the kerbstones of a round barrow. To support this suggestion, he noted that round barrows were known at Poole, around 20 miles (32 kilometres) to the east of the site.

The excavation yielded no finds, and thus it produced no means of reliably dating the construction of the site. Wainwright suggested that the ring was Early Bronze Age on the basis of other, dated circles in Britain. Based on his analysis of the site's stratigraphy, he argued that the stones had likely been removed from their original position amid agricultural development in the second half of the seventeenth century. According to Burl, the history of the site "illuminates the perils of superficial fieldwork". As of 2003, the Hampton Down ring was the only one of the Dorset circles to have seen excavation.

Following excavation, several stones were placed in the original sockets in order to create a reconstruction of the original circle. A fence was then erected around the circle to discourage further interference.
