= Stone circles in the British Isles and Brittany =

Megalithic tradition of monuments

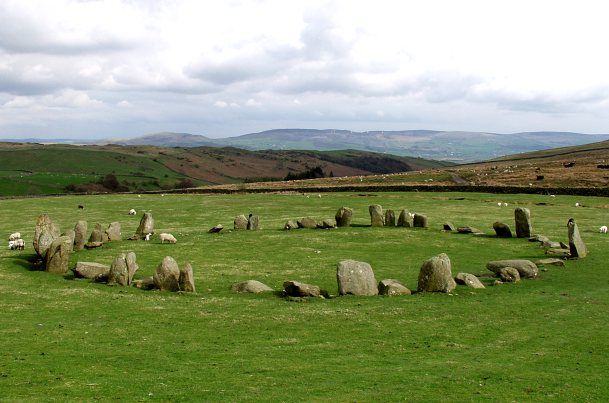
Swinside stone circle, in the Lake District, England, which megalithic specialist Aubrey Burl called "the loveliest of all the circles" in north-western Europe.

The stone circles in the British Isles and Brittany are a megalithic tradition of monuments consisting of standing stones arranged in rings. These were constructed from 3200 to 2000 BCE in Great Britain, Ireland and Brittany. It has been estimated that around 4,000 of these monuments were originally constructed in these parts of north-western Europe during this period. Around 1,300 of them are recorded, the others having been destroyed.

Although stone circles have been erected throughout history by a variety of societies and for a variety of reasons, in the Late Neolithic and Early Bronze Ages, this particular tradition was limited to Great Britain, Ireland and the neighbouring area of continental Europe now known as Brittany. The rings were not distributed equally across this area, but were concentrated in several highland regions: north-eastern and central Scotland, the Lake District, the south-west peninsula of England, and the north and south-west of Ireland. Sparser groupings can also be found in Caithness, the Outer Hebrides, the Peak District, the Wicklow Mountains, Wales and Wessex.

Their original purpose is not fully known, but archaeological investigation has shed some light on it. It is widely thought that they served a ritual or ceremonial purpose, particularly in relation to solar and/or lunar alignments. In a minority of cases, some were also used as cemeteries, with burials being made in and around the circle.

Antiquarian investigation into the circles began in the Early Modern period, intensifying after the publications of notable English antiquarian William Stukeley in the 18th century. At the time, scholars understood little of prehistoric Britain, with the megalithic circles typically being ascribed either to the druids of the Iron Age or to the Danish settlers of Early Medieval times.

In the 20th century, with the development of archaeology, archaeologists could investigate the circles in more detail. They dated them to the Late Neolithic and Bronze Ages. Since the late 20th century, many of these monuments were adopted as "sacred sites" by adherents of contemporary pagan religions such as Neo-Druidism, Wicca and the Goddess movement, and they used the sites as places to conduct their magico-religious rites.

== Background ==
=== Early Neolithic ===
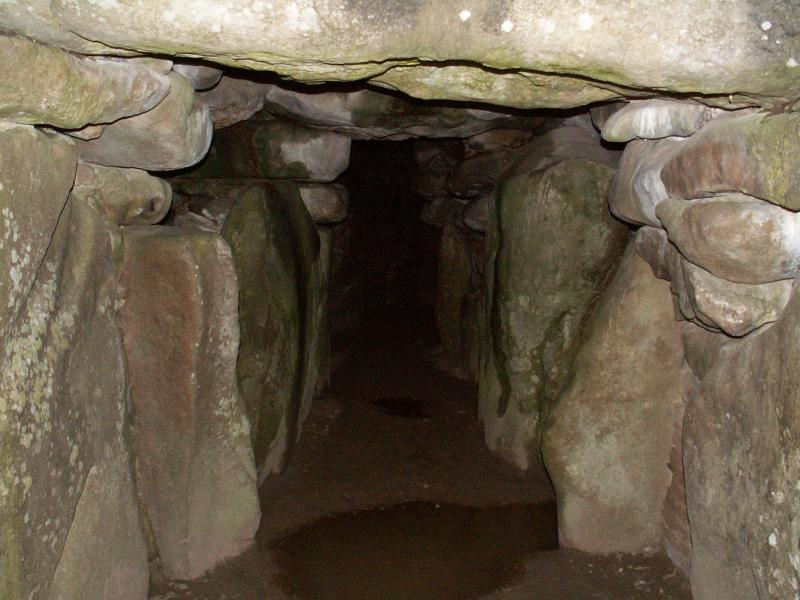
The interior of West Kennet Long Barrow in Wiltshire. Long barrows such as this one were the dominant form of megalithic architecture before the development of the stone circle tradition.

During the Neolithic, or 'New Stone Age', there were extensive cultural changes across north-western Europe. The introduction of agriculture ended the hunter-gatherer lifestyle which had dominated in the preceding Palaeolithic ('Old Stone Age') and Mesolithic ('Middle Stone Age') periods.

During the Early Neolithic in Brittany and the British Isles, the megalithic tradition of building chambered tombs for the dead had waxed and waned. The chambered tomb tradition lasted between about 4000 and 3500 BCE, although an earlier example, at Carrowmore in County Sligo, has been disputably dated to 5000 BCE. The length of this tradition led prehistorian Mike Parker Pearson to note that it was "a relatively short-lived fashion in archaeological terms." In southern England, 84% of chambered tombs were built somewhere between a north-east to a south-east orientation with western directions almost entirely neglected. From these findings it is thus concluded that the east had some special significance regarding death and thus possibly the afterlife for their builders.

In some parts of the British Isles, architectural changes were made to the style of chambered tomb, which may have been a forerunner of the later circular design of the stone rings. In the later Clyde tombs of south-western Scotland and the court-cairns of northern Ireland, crescent-shaped forecourts were constructed inside the tombs. This would have enabled more people to enter the tomb and take part in any rites there in sunlight.

During the Early Neolithic another form of monument was also constructed in the British Isles, now known by archaeologists as causewayed enclosures. These consisted of massive circular ditch-and-bank earthworks. Construction of causewayed enclosures in the lowland regions of Southern England flourished around 3800 BCE, but by 3200 BCE almost all of them had been abandoned by their users. No equivalents have been found in the highland areas of northern Britain. Despite having excavated a number of these sites across southern Britain, archaeologists do not know their exact purpose. It has been suggested that they were camps, markets, cattle kraals or occasional settlements, or perhaps ritual centres for the celebration of seasonal festivals or cemeteries.

=== Late Neolithic ===
As the transition from the Early Neolithic to the Late Neolithic took place in around 3000 BCE, there was much economic and technological continuity. But there was considerable change in the style of monuments erected, particularly in southern and eastern England. By that date, the long barrows, causewayed enclosures, and cursuses which had predominated in the Early Neolithic had ceased to be built. They were replaced by circular monuments of various kinds. These include not only stone circles, but also earthen henges and timber circles. This transition toward circular monuments had symbolic associations. As the archaeologist Aubrey Burl stated, "There was a change from the cramped, gloomy chamber of a tomb to the unroofed, wide ring, a change from darkness to light, from the dead to the living, from the grave to the sky." Similar observations were made by the historian Ronald Hutton, who commented that the circular shape of the rings "mirrors the sun, the full moon and the bounds of the horizon" and that such a shape can also be "profoundly egalitarian".

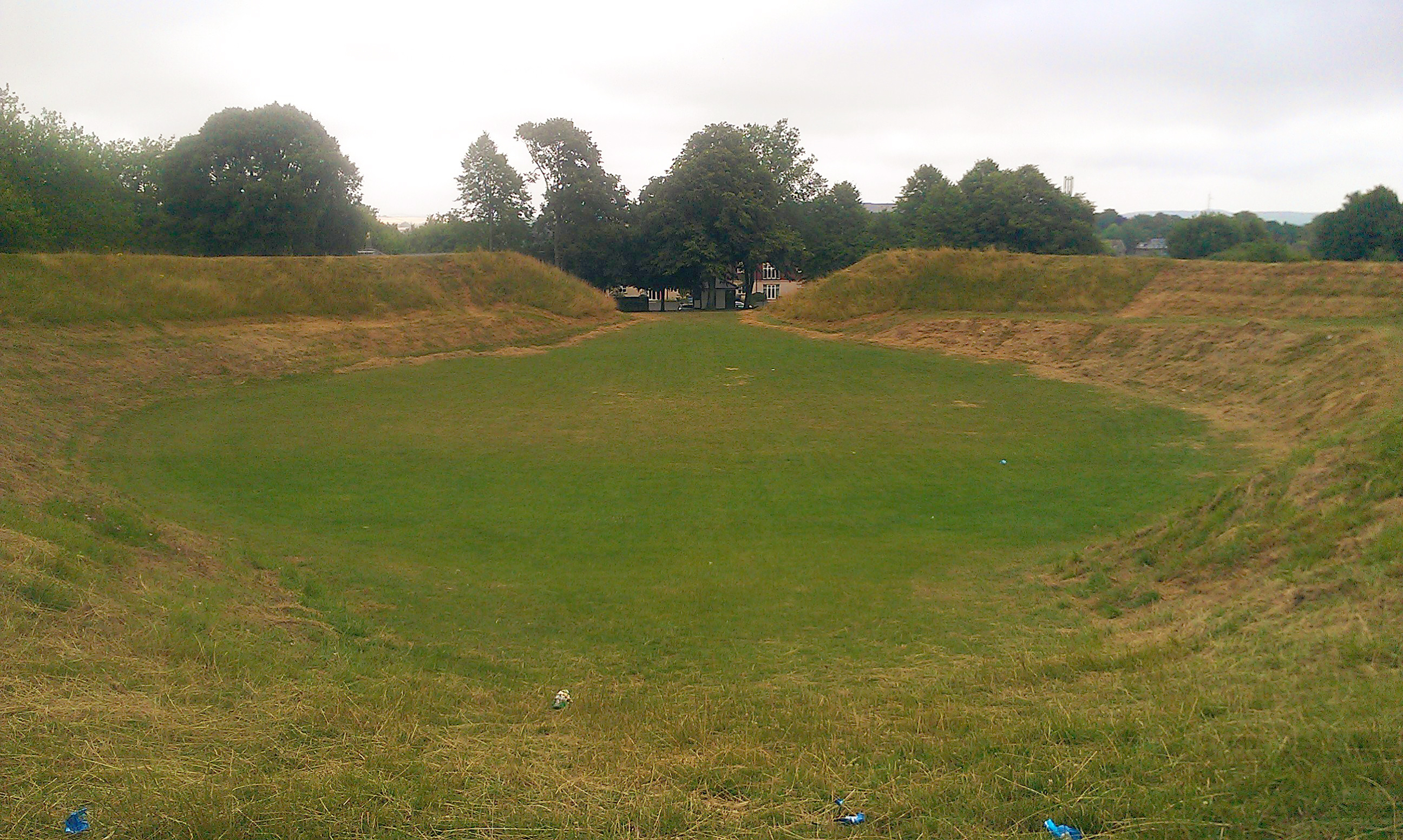
Alongside the stone circles, earthen henges (such as Maumbury Rings in Dorset) were erected in Late Neolithic Britain. Maumbury Rings (above) was later converted into a Roman amphitheatre.

This transition was, according to historian Ronald Hutton, "as fundamental as that from the Mesolithic had been." Archaeological pollen analysis has shown that it was a period when scrub and weeds were spreading over what had formerly been cultivated fields, and forests that had previously been cleared began to grow back. Chambered tombs were blocked up and abandoned, implying that people were ceasing to use them as cultic sites. Several former causewayed enclosures were converted into defensive structures with gateways and walls, and in some cases they were attacked. Evidence for conflict has been found at Carn Brea in Cornwall, Hambledon Hill in Dorset, and Crickley Hill in Gloucestershire. Various archaeologists have suggested that this was a period of particular turmoil within the British Isles, perhaps caused by an overuse of land, the failure of crops, famine, plague, climatic change, or an increase in population that was not supported by the food supply.

=== Early Bronze Age ===
The start of the Bronze Age in Britain was signalled by the introduction of bronze, an alloy of copper and usually tin. Ideologically, there is no evidence for a change in Brittany and the British Isles at this time, with communities continuing to construct megalithic stone circles. The archaeologists J.M. Coles and A.F. Harding noted that across western Europe, the Bronze Age was "closely and logically connected" with the Late Neolithic which preceded it, and that the marker that is applied between the two by contemporary archaeologists is "arbitrary".

== Description ==
The historian Ronald Hutton noted that, along with the chambered long barrows of the Early Neolithic, stone circles are one of the most prominent forms of monument produced in prehistoric Britain. Despite the commonly used term "stone circles", many of these monuments are not true circles, but are instead ellipses or ovals. The stone circles are not always found in isolation from other forms of monument and often intersect with timber and earth structures. For this reason, the archaeologist Richard Bradley cautioned against understanding stone circles, timber circles, and earthen henges as distinct "types" of monument.

The archaeologist Alexander Thom suggested that the stone circles fell into four broad classes: circles, flattened circles, egg-shaped rings, and ellipses.

Some stone circles, such as that at Stanton Drew in Somerset, are approached by a short alignment of paired stones. There are also stone avenues that link different monuments in the landscape, such as the West Kennet Avenue which links the Avebury henge to The Sanctuary. In some cases, the stone circles survive in such a damaged state that it is not possible to know what they originally looked like.

In some examples, timber posts were replaced with stone ones, perhaps with the intention of making the monument more durable and protecting it from decay. In others, it is possible that both wooden and stone features of the circle were contemporary with each other.

Like henges, the stone circles are almost exclusively found in the British Isles. The distribution of the stone circles is distinctive as it is broader than that of the henges. They are found in most areas of Britain where stone is available, except the island's south-eastern corner. They are most densely concentrated in south-western Britain and near Aberdeen. There is much diversity in the design of these circles, both between different regions and within them. According to Mike Parker Pearson, this is "perhaps unsurprising for a thousand-year fashion".

== Construction ==
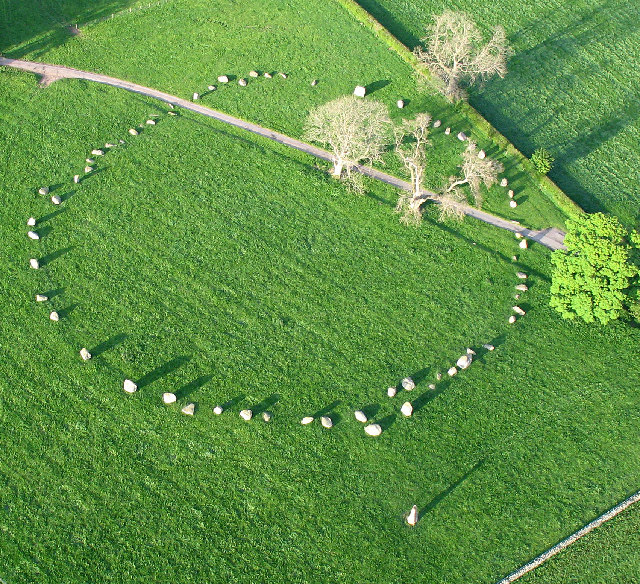
Long Meg and Her Daughters in Cumbria, the largest example of Alexander Thom's Type B Flattened Circle. Long Meg is the detached stone at the bottom of the picture.

The archaeologist and stone circle specialist Aubrey Burl noted that the stone circle builders would have had to undertake "careful planning" before they erected these monuments. There was much that they had to take into consideration: the choice of location, the size of the ring, the transport of the heavy stones, the laying out of the circle or ellipse, and the preparation of stone holes. They may have also had to plot astronomical alignments, making the task more difficult.

Most stone circles were constructed upon flat ground, although some were instead built on a slope. At some sites, such as Kiltierney in County Fermanagh, the land was flattened especially for this purpose, although in other cases it is clear that the land had been flattened by earlier communities, who had used the land for settlement or agriculture.

Aaron Watson has argued that various circles were located in a particular position to give the appearance of occupying the centre of the world, representing a microcosm of the surrounding area.

In some instances it appears that the choice of material used was important. For instance, at the Ring of Brodgar the stones used in the circle were produced from a variety of different sources.

Very little is known about the process of quarrying the stone and transporting it to the sites of the circles. One exception is at Vestra Fiold in Orkney, where Colin Richards led an excavation that determined that the stones used for the Orcadian stone circles were cut from a horizontal seam of bedrock that was located just below the surface. These had been eased over a large pit and supported on stone trestles, after which wooden rollers and a sled were likely positioned underneath, allowing the megalith to be moved. One of these stones, which weighed over 10 tonnes, had been left in its original position poised on stone supports, to be discovered by the archaeological excavators.

=== Dating, number and size ===
The number of stone circles is often misinterpreted, as damaged burial mounds, kerb cairns, or ring cairns are often confused for stone circle. The archetypal ‘stone circles’ of the mid-to-late Neolithic are far rarer than commonly assumed, appearing mostly in Cumbria, Cornwall, Wiltshire, and Western Scotland. They are connected morphologically with sites in Ireland, connecting the henge tradition of Eastern England, with the passage tomb tradition of Ireland.

Aubrey Burl (counting tentative examples and burial mounds) noted that archaeologists assumed that for every stone circle that survived to the late 20th century, there would have been two lost. From the 1300 surviving examples, Burl calculated that there might have originally been around 4000 stone circles across Britain, Ireland and Brittany.

Since the 1950s, archaeologists have been able to use radiocarbon dating of the material around the stones in order to accurately date their original construction. As of 2000, the earliest known radiocarbon dating of a stone circle was from the Lochmaben Stone in Dumfriesshire, which was dated to 2525 ± 85 BCE, whilst the latest examples came from Sandy Road in Perth (1200 ± 150 BCE), from Drombeg in County Cork (790 ± 80 BCE), and from the Five-Stone ring of Cashelkeety in County Kerry (715 ± 50 BCE). Burl said that, the calibration of these dates indicated that the stone circle tradition existed between 3300 and 900 BCE.

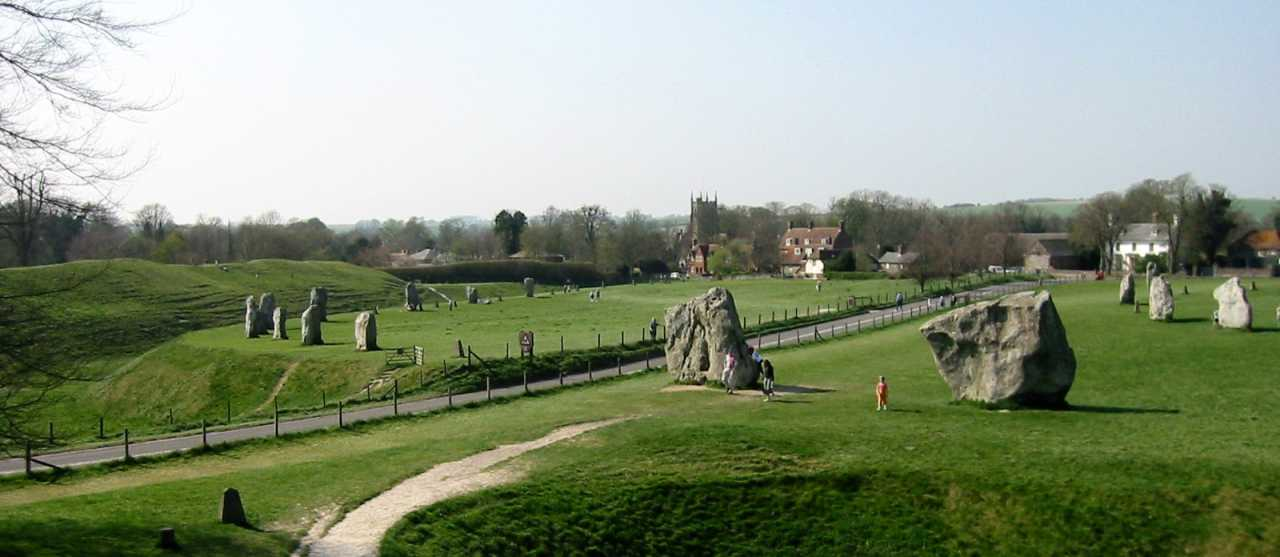
Avebury in Wiltshire is the largest example of a stone circle from the British Isles, and is physically situated within an earlier henge.

The size of the megalithic rings varied, perhaps according to the number of people who would be using it during ceremonies. Burl calculated that the largest stone circle in terms of both diameter and area was Stanton Drew in Somerset, with a diameter of 112.2 metres (368 ft) and an area of 9,887 m^{2} (2.44 acres). Second came the Ring of Brodgar in Orkney at 103.6 metres (340 ft) in diameter and 8,430 m^{2} (2.08 acres) in area, whilst third was Avebury in Wiltshire, which had a diameter of 102.4 metres (336 ft) and an area of 8,236m² (2.04 acres). However, Burl did not count the outer stone circle at Avebury, which has a diameter of 331.6 metres (1,088 ft), making it Britain's largest stone circle. All of the largest circles were found in or near earlier henge monuments. Such gargantuan monuments were rare. Burl calculated that most of the megalithic rings (92%) had an average diameter of 13.7 metres (45 ft), with an average area of 150 m^{2} (1615 ft²).

=== Megalithic yard ===
The archaeologist Alexander Thom proposed that the stone circles were built using a unit of measurement which he called the "megalithic yard", about 2.72 feet (0.83 m). He came to this conclusion following more than forty years of surveying the monuments, aided by his son Archibald Stevenson Thom. Parker Pearson stated that "the idea of a standard unit of measurement is very plausible" but perhaps not as regular as Thom and others have argued. In 1980, Burl noted that the idea of Thom's Megalithic Yard "remain[ed] contentious".

=== Astronomical alignments ===
Thom also argued that the builders of these circles were accomplished astronomers and deliberately included astronomical alignments in the rings. According to Parker Pearson, however, many of the circles do not appear to be based on any astronomical alignment. Pearson cautioned that Late Neolithic/Bronze Age conceptions of cosmology were likely very different from modern understandings of astronomy. However, it has been found that the earliest standing stone monuments in the British Isles, the great circles such as Callanish on the Isle of Lewis and Stenness on the Isle of Orkney, were specifically constructed to align with the sun and moon, and the movements of the sun and moon across the local landscape.

== Purposes ==
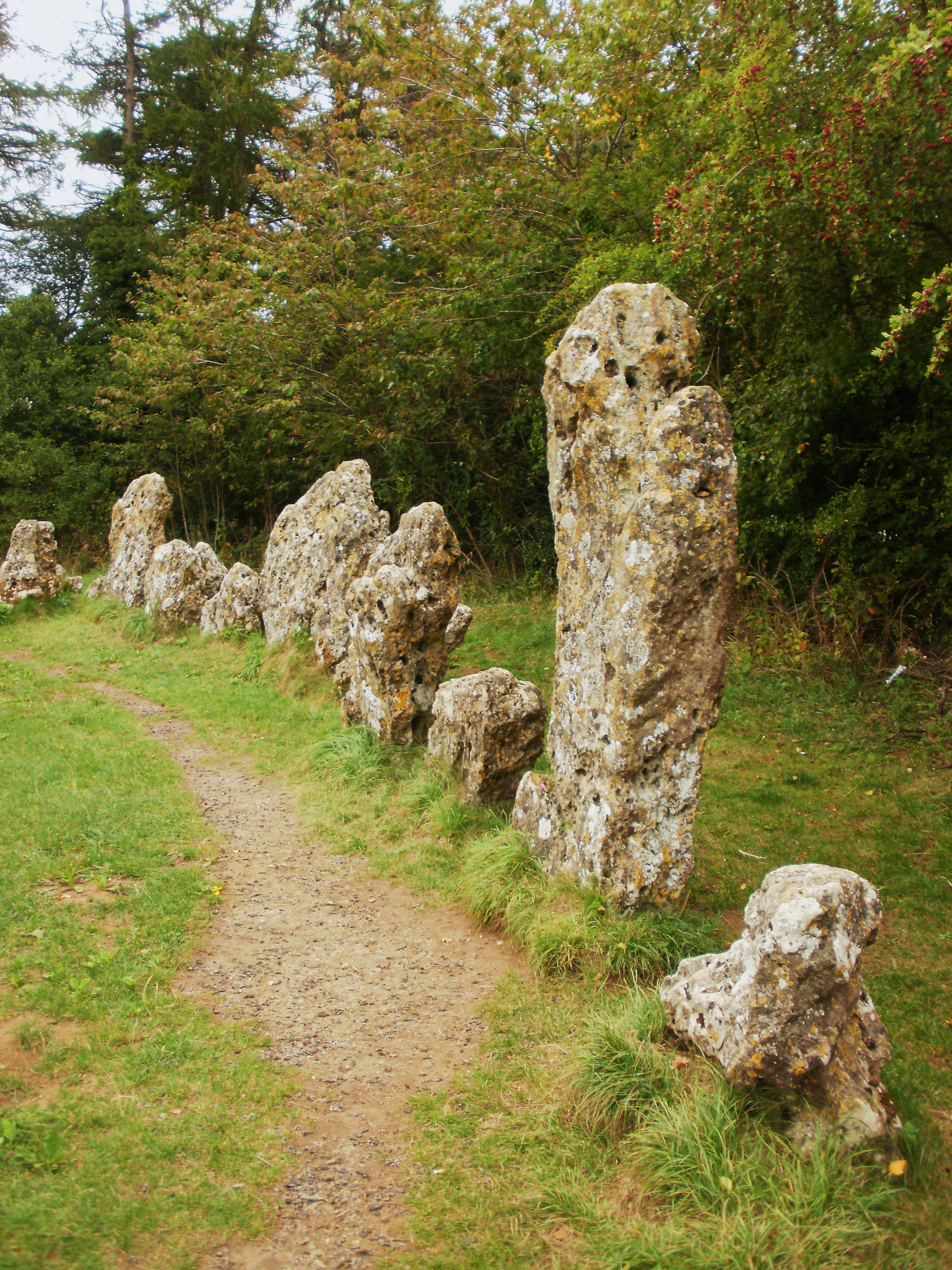
The largest stone in the King's Men, a stone circle that is the dominant part of the Rollright Stones complex in the Cotswolds.

There has been much analysis and debate about these monuments. No simple explanations have emerged. The original purposes of the stone ring monuments has been widely debated by antiquarians and archaeologists for several centuries.

These stone circles typically show very little evidence of human visitation during the period immediately following their creation. This suggests that they were not sites used for rituals that left archaeologically visible evidence. They may have been deliberately left as "silent and empty monuments". The archaeologists Mike Parker Pearson and Ramilsonina suggested that in Neolithic Britain, stone was associated with the dead and wood with the living. Bradley noted that this interpretation was "consistent with the archaeological evidence from Britain", where evidence for feasting and other human activities have been found at a range of timber sites but not at their stone counterparts. At the latter sites, there has been evidence of human remains. Bradley suggested that the stone circles may have been spaces "devoted to the dead". Other archaeologists have suggested that the stone might not represent ancestors, but rather other supernatural entities, such as deities.

== Regional distribution ==
Aubrey Burl's gazetteer lists 1,303 stone circles in Britain, Ireland and Brittany. The largest number of these are found in Scotland, with 508 sites recorded. There are 316 in England; 187 in Ireland; 156 in Northern Ireland; 81 in Wales; 49 in Brittany; and 6 in the Channel Isles.

=== South-west Britain ===
There are 13 to be found on Dartmoor, including Brisworthy stone circle and Scorhill, and numerous examples to be found in Cornwall such as The Merry Maidens, The Hurlers and Boscawen-Un.

In contrast to the over 70 stone circles known from Dartmoor, there are only two known from Exmoor: Porlock Stone Circle and Withypool Stone Circle. The contrast between the number of rings on the two moors may be because Dartmoor has abundant natural granite while Exmoor has none, instead having Devonian slates and Hangman Grits, both of which easily break up into small slabs, resulting in a general shortage of big stones on Exmoor. The two Exmoor stones are made from smaller stones, which archaeologists have termed miniliths. However, the presence of other Exmoor constructions, such as the clapper bridge at Tarr Steps and the three-metre Long Stone at Challacombe, which do use locally sourced large megaliths, suggests that larger stones would have been available had the sites' builders desired, and that the use of miniliths was perhaps deliberate.

=== Wessex ===
Wessex contains the two best known, though most atypical stone circles, Avebury and Stonehenge. All of the other Wiltshire circles are in a heavily ruined state and in some cases have been destroyed. As noted by the archaeologist Aubrey Burl, these examples have left behind "only frustrating descriptions and vague positions". Most of the known Wiltshire examples were erected on low-lying positions in the landscape. In northern Wiltshire, in the area to the south of Swindon, at least seven stone circles are reported as having existed, often only a few miles distant from one another; of these, the Day House Lane Stone Circle is the only example to survive. The stones of the Fir Clump Stone Circle, already flattened in the 1860s, were for instance removed during construction of the M4 motorway in 1969.

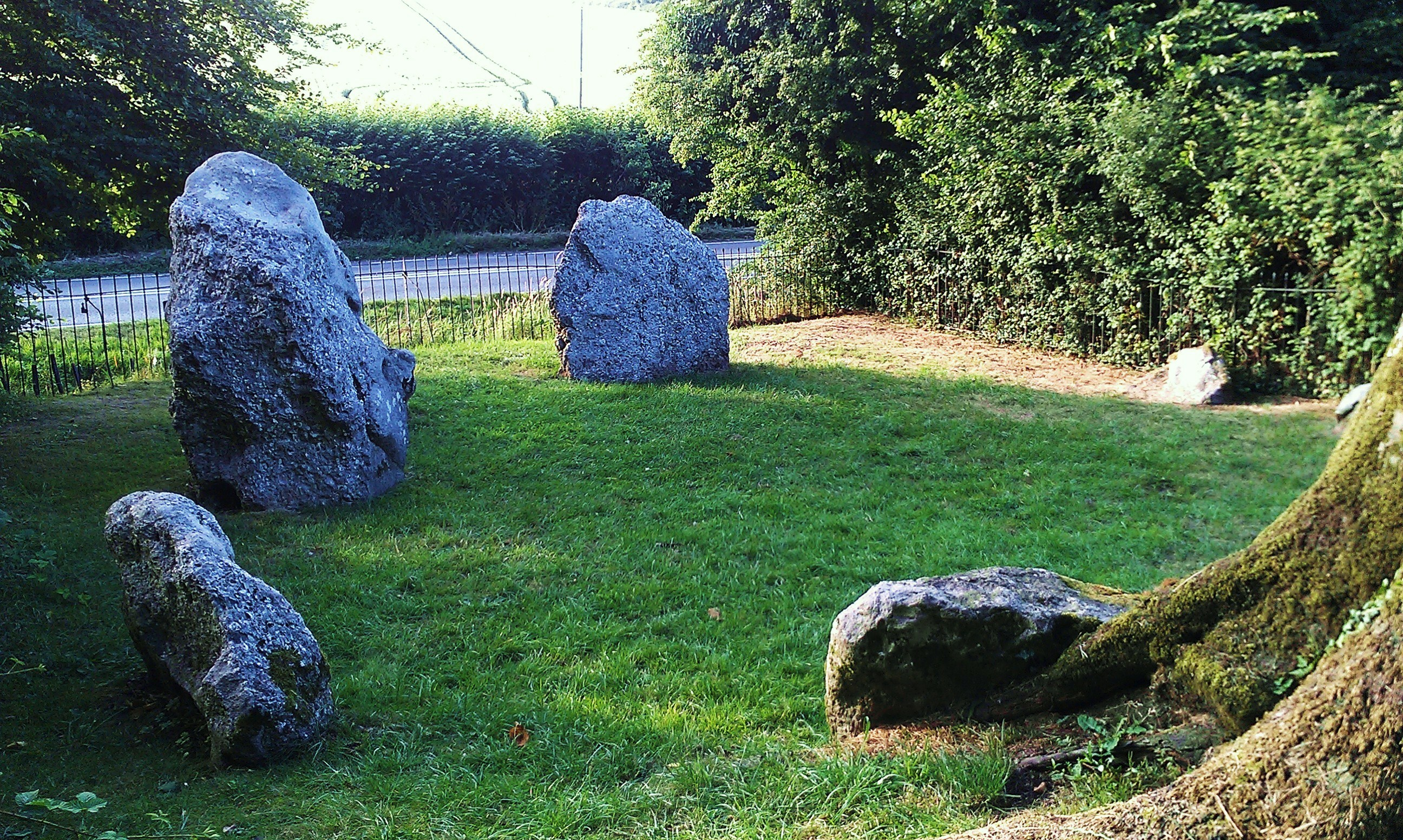
The Nine Stones near Winterbourne Abbas, Dorset

The area of modern Dorset has a "thin scatter" of stone circles, with nine possible examples known within its boundaries: Hampton Down Stone Circle, Kingston Russell Stone Circle, Nine Stones, and Rempstone Stone Circle remain visible. The archaeologist John Gale described these as "a small but significant group" of such monuments. All are located within five miles of the sea. All but Rempstone—which is on the Isle of Purbeck—are located on the chalk hills west of Dorchester. The Dorset circles have a simplistic typology, being of comparatively small size, with none exceeding 28 metres in diameter. All are oval in shape, although perhaps have been altered from their original form.

With the exception of the sandstone Rempstone circle, all consist of sarsen boulders. Much of this may have been obtained from the "Valley of Stones", a location at the foot of Crow Hill near to Littlebredy, which is located within the vicinity of many of these circles. With the exception of the circle at Litton Cheney, none display evidence of any outlying stones or earthworks around the stone circle. The archaeologists Stuart and Cecily Piggott believed that the circles of Dorset were probably of Bronze Age origin, a view endorsed by Burl, who noted that their distribution did not match that of any known Neolithic sites. It is possible that they were not all constructed around the same date. The Piggotts suggested that while they may well be Early Bronze Age in date, it is also possible that "their use and possibly their construction may last into the Middle and even into the Late Bronze Age". Their nearest analogies are the circles found on Dartmoor and Exmoor to the west, and the Stanton Drew stone circles to the north. It is also possible that the stone circles were linked to a number of earthen henges erected in Dorset around the same period. On average Dorset's earthen henges are four times larger than the stone circles.

=== Northern England ===
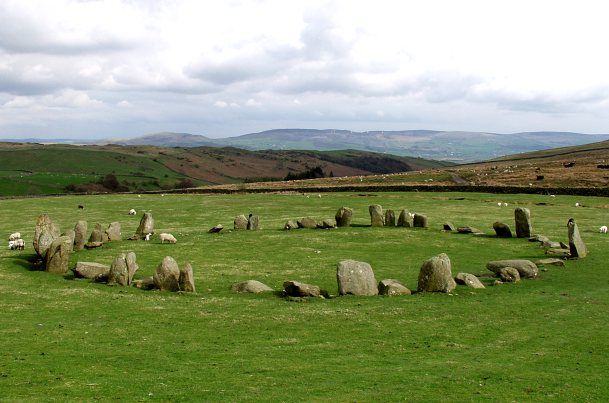
Swinside stone circle, in Cumbria

In what is now northern England, there was a particularly rich stone circle tradition in Cumbria. Several large megalithic circles were constructed here, such as Castlerigg stone circle - near Keswick, Swinside - just north of Barrow in Furness, and Long Meg and Her Daughters, near Penrith, in addition to smaller circles such as Birkrigg stone circle near Ulverston, known locally as the 'Druid's circle'. Long Meg circle is among the widest stone circles in Britain, with an approximate diameter of 300 ft. As no discernible solar alignments have been identified, it has been suggested that Castlerigg was an important trading hub in the neolithic Langdale axe industry after a number of stone axes were found within the site.

Further south, in modern-day Derbyshire, a number of stone circles remain, notably Arbor Low - a circle of collapsed stones, many fragmented, though it is thought that there were approximately 42 stones when the site was in use and all stones were intact. This site is also considered as a major crossing point of ley lines. Several miles south of Arbor Low sits the Nine Ladies stone circle, which is nestled in the upland forests of Stanton Moor; itself containing a number of other neolithic cairns and circles. Nine Ladies is thought to have come about as a result of neolithic gritstone quarries nearby - quarries which are still operational today.

Some other very concentrated areas of stone circles exist in the North of England, but are sporadically distributed and mainly consist of small stones which are based in unkempt grassland. An example of this is the area surrounding Ilkley in the far west of Yorkshire, where at least five stone circles, such as the Twelve Apostles and the nearby Grubstones, sit within a ten mile radius.

=== Scotland ===
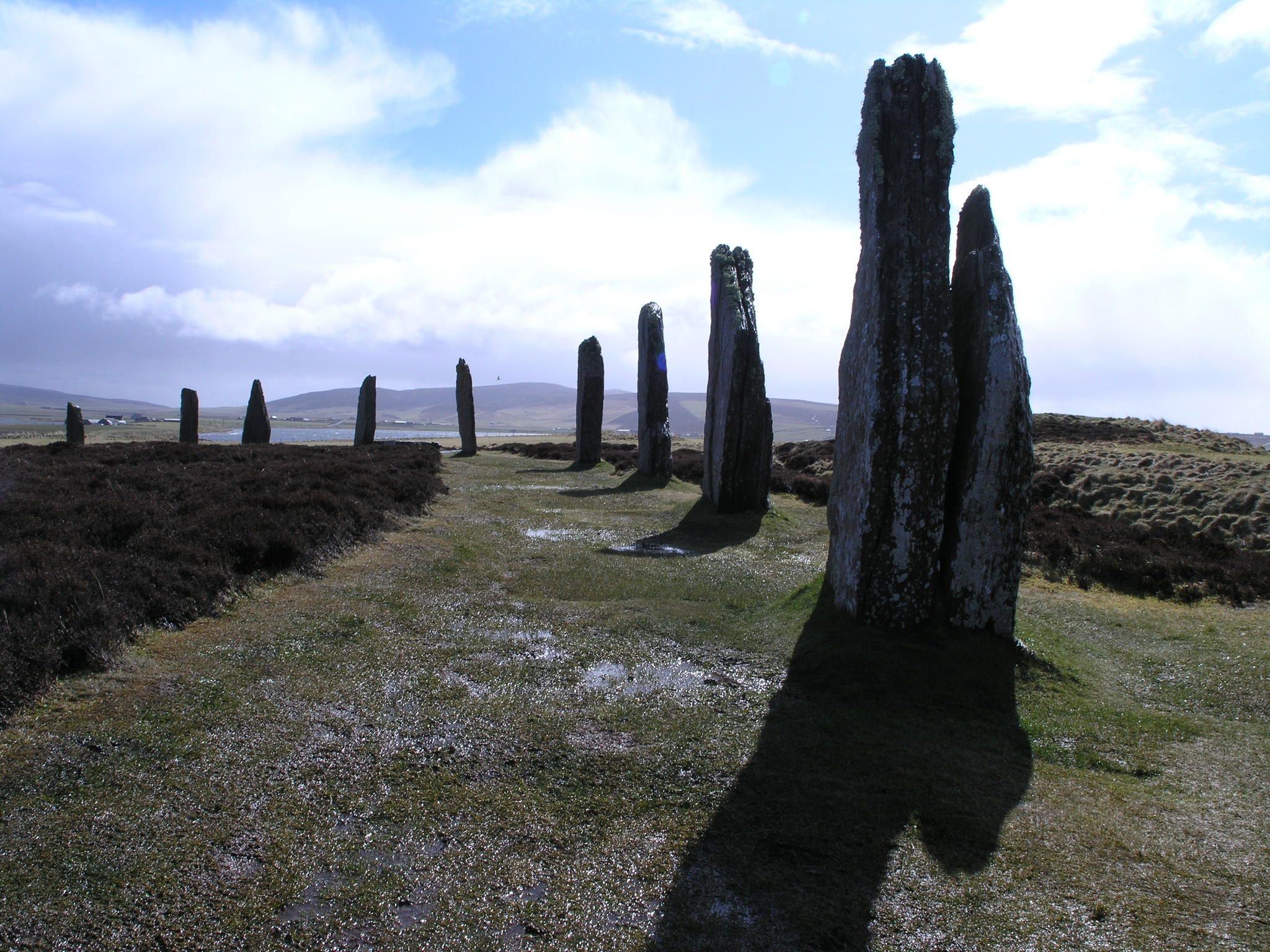
The Ring of Brodgar, a Neolithic stone circle on Orkney, Scotland.

Stone circles exist throughout Scotland, from Ninestane Rig in the far south to more famous examples in the far north and particularly in the islands (where several form part of a UNESCO World Heritage Site). The Callanish Stones are one of the best-known examples in the Outer Hebrides, while Orkney is known for its Neolithic monuments, including the Ring of Brodgar and the Standing Stones of Stenness. In Aberdeenshire, northeast Scotland, there are many recumbent stone circles to be found – the recumbent is a massive stone lying on its side, generally to the southwest of the circle.

=== Ireland ===
In counties Cork and Kerry in southwest Ireland there is a preponderance of axial stone circles (see Drombeg stone circle). As with the recumbent stone circles of Scotland a stone to the southwest lies on its side but the stone is not particularly large. In northeast Ulster at Beaghmore multiple stone circles, cairns and stone rows are found. Circles are also found in western Ireland at Lough Gur in County Limerick and near Cong, County Mayo.

== Later history ==
In some cases, the stones were removed from the rings for use as a building material. In others, the site has been disrupted by natural causes such as trees, the roots of which have shifted the location of the megaliths.

=== Late Bronze and Iron Ages ===
Evidence for the destruction of stone circles first comes from the Late Bronze Age.

=== Medieval period ===
Following the Christianisation of Britain in the Early Middle Ages, various Christian clergyman denounced those pagans who continued to venerate at stones in the landscape, which in some cases perhaps implied stone circles.

By the Late Middle Ages, references to prehistoric monuments in the British Isles were rare, and were usually only to note down practical matters, such as that a judicial court would be held near to one or that a farmer's land lay near to one. A rare exception is found in the fictionalised History of the Kings of Britain (c.1136), in which the chronicle's author Geoffrey of Monmouth claimed that Stonehenge had once been the Giants' Ring, and that it had originally been located on Mount Killaraus in Ireland, until the wizard Merlin moved it to Salisbury Plain.

=== Antiquarian and archaeological investigation ===
Many 19th-century antiquarians produced plans of the circles which were "inaccurate and slipshod."

== Folklore ==
In the Mediaeval and Early Modern period onward, much folklore developed around the subject of the stone circles.

In Britain, several stone circles have been connected to the countless stones motif in folklore. The earliest recorded account comes from Philip Sidney's The 7 Wonders of England, written prior to 1586. Sidney linked the motif to Stonehenge. Subsequently, the antiquary Richard Carew mentioned the story in his book, The Survey of Cornwall, published in 1602, noting that it was applied both the Stonehenge and to The Hurlers in Cornwall. The countless stones motif has been attributed to over five different stone circles, as well as several ruined long barrows such as Little Kit's Coty House in Kent.

== See also ==
- List of stone circles
- List of Stone Age art
