= Rempstone Stone Circle =

Stone circle near Corfe Castle in Dorset, England

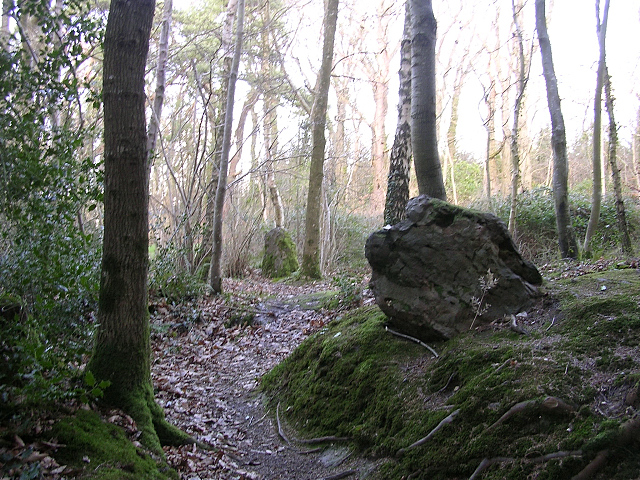
- Stones from the Rempstone Stone Circle amid the woodland

- Location within Dorset
- 50.6385°N 2.0089°W
- Type: Stone circle
- Periods: Neolithic / Bronze Age
- Location: Isle of Purbeck

Scheduled monument
- Official name: Rempstone Stone Circle
- Designated: 15 October 1924
- Reference no.: 1018186

Rempstone Stone Circle (grid reference SY994820) is a stone circle near to Corfe Castle on the Isle of Purbeck in the south-western English county of Dorset. Archaeologists believe that it was likely erected during the Bronze Age. The Rempstone ring is part of a tradition of stone circle construction that spread throughout much of Britain, Ireland and Brittany during the Late Neolithic and Early Bronze Age, over a period between 3,300 and 900 BC. The purpose of such monuments is unknown, although archaeologists speculate that they were likely religious sites, with the stones perhaps having supernatural associations for those who built the circles. Local folklore holds that the stones arrived in their position after being thrown at Corfe Castle by the Devil.

A number of these circles were built in the area around modern Dorset, typically being smaller than those found elsewhere. Most of these Dorset circles are made of sarsen stone, although the Rempstone circle is unique in being made from local sandstone. The southern half of the circle has been destroyed, with five upright and three recumbent stones remaining extant. Having been damaged by eighteenth century clay workings, the monument is at present situated within dense woodland. In 1957, a possible avenue of stones leading to the circle was discovered by ploughing but subsequently removed.

== Location ==
Rempstone Stone Circle is at national grid reference 39940821. The incomplete stone circle lies in a dense wood just to the south of the B3351 road, 4 kilometres (2.5 mi) east of Corfe Castle and 5 kilometres (3.1 mi) west of Studland. It is located at the foot of Nine Barrows Down, at a height of 278 feet (85 m) above sea level. It is 0.5 miles (800 m) south of Rempstone Lodge. As with the Nine Stones at Winterbourne Abbas, the Rempstone Stone Circle is located in a valley. The land on which the site sits is privately owned, and is accorded legal protection under the Ancient Monuments and Archaeological Areas Act 1979.

== Context ==
While the transition from the Early Neolithic to the Late Neolithic witnessed much economic and technological continuity, it also saw a considerable change in the style of monuments erected, particularly in southern and eastern England. By 3000 BC, the long barrows, causewayed enclosures, and cursuses which had predominated in the Early Neolithic had ceased being built, and were instead replaced by circular monuments of various kinds. These include earthen henges, timber circles and stone circles. These latter circles are found in most areas of Britain where stone is available, with the exception of the island's south-eastern corner. They are most densely concentrated in south-western Britain and on the north-eastern horn of Scotland, near Aberdeen. The tradition of their construction may have lasted for 2,400 years, from 3300 to 900 BC, with the major phase of building taking place between 3000 and 1,300 BC.

These stone circles typically show very little evidence of human visitation during the period immediately following their creation. This suggests that they were not sites used for rituals that left archaeologically visible evidence, and may have been deliberately left as "silent and empty monuments". The archaeologist Mike Parker Pearson suggested that in Neolithic Britain, stone was associated with the dead and wood with the living. Other archaeologists have suggested that the stone might not represent ancestors, but rather other supernatural entities, such as deities.

The area of modern Dorset has only a "thin scatter" of stone circles, with nine possible examples known within its boundaries. The archaeologist John Gale described these as "a small but significant group" of such monuments, and all are located within five miles of the sea. Of the Dorset circles, Rempstone is the only example that is not located on the chalk hills west of Dorchester. The Dorset circles have a simplistic typology, being of comparatively small size, with none exceeding 28 metres (92 feet) in diameter. All are oval in shape, although perhaps have been altered from their original form. The Rempstone circle is exceptional among these, as it is the only one which does not consist of sarsen stone. However, like all the others—with the exception of the circle at Litton Cheney—it does not display evidence of any outlying stones or earthworks.

The archaeologists Stuart and Cecily Piggott believed that the circles of Dorset were probably of Bronze Age origin, a view endorsed by the archaeologist Aubrey Burl, who noted that their distribution did not match that of any known Neolithic sites. It is possible that they were not all constructed around the same date, and the Piggotts suggested that while they may well be Early Bronze Age in date, it is also possible that "their use and possibly their construction may last into the Middle and even into the Late Bronze Age". Their nearest analogies are the circles found on Dartmoor and Exmoor to the west, and the Stanton Drew stone circles to the north. It is also possible that the stone circles were linked to a number of earthen henges erected in Dorset around the same period.

== Description ==
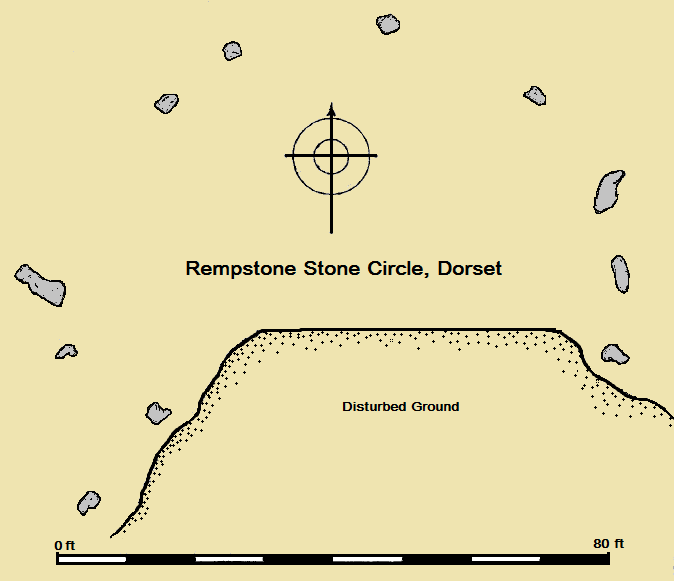
Plan of Rempstone Stone Circle (based on that published by Piggott and Piggott in 1939)

Burl has noted that Rempstone Stone Circle is "damaged and overgrown". Similarly, Gale stated that "the description and evaluation of this site [is] very difficult" on account of it being "much disturbed". Eight stones survive; five are standing, while three more are recumbent. The standing stones vary in size, and are irregularly shaped. The stones are sandstone boulders which geologically belong to the Bagshot Beds, on which the circle is located.

The southern half of the circle has been destroyed, likely by clay workings that took place in the area during the late eighteenth century. At the south-west of the site, three more stones are visible but half-buried; these may not be in their original position. The west side of the site is cut by pools and ditches formed by old clay workings. The surviving stones form an arc that suggests that the circle originally had a diameter of about 26 metres, or 80 feet. If this was the case then it would have been the second largest stone circle in Dorset, after Kingston Russell Stone Circle.

The circle was included in the archaeologist O. G. S. Crawford's Map of Neolithic Wessex, printed by the Ordnance Survey in 1932. In this publication, the site was erroneously assigned co-ordinates of the Breamore Wood Long Barrow. As of 2003, the site had not been excavated.

=== Related monuments ===
In August 1957, the local farmer W. G. Best was ploughing on his Brenscombe Farm when he uncovered a row of 23 stones that was situated about a half-mile (800 m) west of Rempstone Stone Circle. His son stood most of these into an upright position, to better assist their later removal. The antiquarian J. Bernard Calkin was alerted to the discovery and visited it prior to the stones being removed by the farmer. Calkin noted that the stones were made of local sandstone and were smaller than the stones in the circle, averaging about 2 feet 6 inches (76 cm) by 1 foot 6 inches (46 cm). He believed that they had been deliberately lain out in two parallel lines, 3 yards (2.7 m) apart and with an interval of five yards (4.6 m) between each stone. Calkin suggested that this may have been a stone avenue or processional way leading to the circle. Burl later expressed scepticism with regard to this interpretation, stating that its "credentials are suspect".

90 feet (27 m) east of the circle is a group of eight stones which may have had some relationship to the circle. There is also a cluster of barrows, known as "Nine Barrows", on the hill immediately to the south of the stone circle.

== Folklore ==
After the monument was discovered and identified in the twentieth century, a folk motif came to be associated with it. According to this story, the circle's stones had landed in their location after having been hurled at Corfe Castle by the Devil. This is a variant of a story that has also been connected to the Agglestone Rock near Studland. According to stories associated with this large sandstone block, it had been thrown by the Devil from The Needles on the Isle of Wight, with the intention of hitting either the castle, Sherborne Abbey, Bindon Abbey, or Salisbury Cathedral.
