= Poor Lot Barrow Cemetery =

Archaeological site in Dorset, England

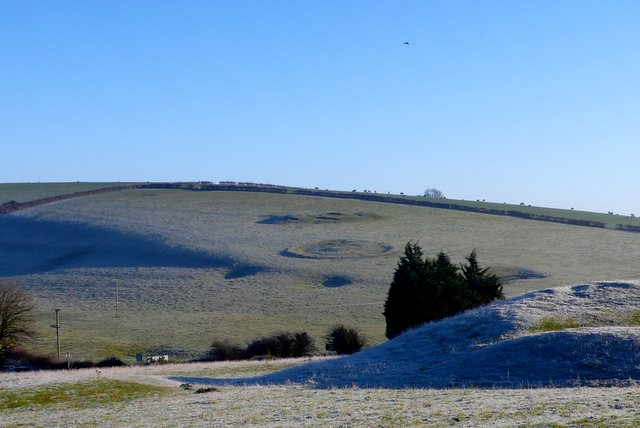
- Looking north: in the foreground are barrows south of the A35: beyond are barrows north of the road

- Location within Dorset
- 50°42′53″N 2°35′1″W
- Type: Round barrow cemetery
- Periods: Bronze Age
- Location: near Winterbourne Abbas
- OS grid reference: SY 589 908

Site notes
- Website: www.english-heritage.org.uk/visit/places/winterbourne-poor-lot-barrows/

Poor Lot Barrow Cemetery is an archaeological site, a group of Bronze Age round barrows, near the A35 road about 2 miles (3.2 km) west of Winterbourne Abbas, in Dorset, England. It is an English Heritage site.

== Description ==
Although the barrows are situated not on a ridge or hilltop, as is usually found, but on relatively low-lying ground, the site is near the head of a valley descending to the east. Most are south of the A35 road, with a few north of the road. They date from about 1500 BC.

There are 44 barrows. Half of these are bowl barrows; the rest include seven bell barrows, six disc barrows, five pond barrows and two bell-disc barrows. The barrows, individually or in groups, are separately listed as ancient monuments.

There is a minor plateau on the west of the site, from which all the barrows can be seen. These include two rough alignments of barrows south of the road, on the eastern edge of the plateau. The alignment nearer the road includes a large ditched bell barrow of diameter 132 feet (40 m) and height 12 feet (3.7 m); adjacent to this on the west is a disc barrow of diameter 104 feet (32 m). To the south-west is the second alignment, where there is a prominent bell barrow of diameter 116 feet (35 m) and height 11 feet (3.4 m).

Two pond barrows were excavated in 1952–1953; pits and flint paving were found, but no burials; little is now left of the excavated barrows.
