= Twelve Apostles, West Yorkshire =

Stone circle in West Yorkshire, England

Twelve Apostles
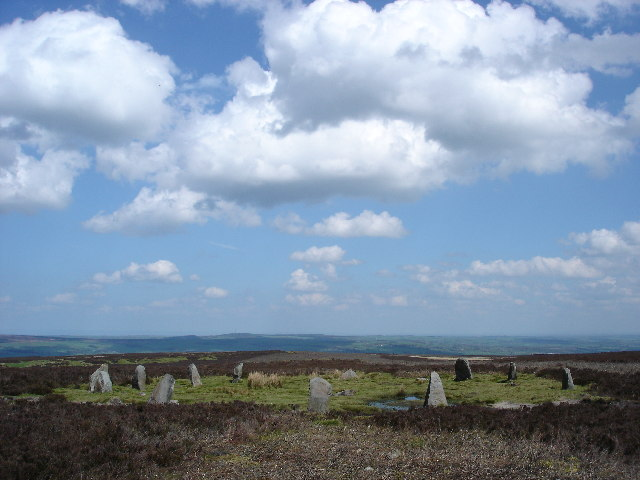

- Location within West Yorkshire
- 53.9016°N 1.809494°W
- Type: Stone circle
- Periods: Bronze Age
- Location: West Yorkshire

The Twelve Apostles (grid reference SE12614506) is a stone circle near Ilkley and Burley in Wharfedale in West Yorkshire, England.

== Location ==
Located on Rombalds Moor which is found between Ilkley Moor and Burley Moor, the Twelve Apostles are in the parish of Burley in Wharfedale. The stone circle is slightly below and to the northeast of an east-west ridge at about 381 metres (1,250 ft) above sea level. The circle is just over 800 metres (2,600 ft) north-west of the nearby Grubstones circle.

== Description ==
The Twelve Apostles consists of the remains of a stone circle with a diameter of about 15 metres. The circle originally had between 16 and 20 stones, but it is now reduced to 12 stones. The stones are made from the local millstone grit. All of the stones were fallen by the mid-20th-century and were lying loose upon the ground.

The circle was inside a bank 1.2 metres (3 ft 11 in) wide and 0.6 metres (2 ft 0 in) high. The bank was still traceable in the 1920s but has apparently eroded since then due to visitors walking over the ground. At the centre of the circle was a small mound, which may have been the disturbed remains of a burial cairn.

In 1971 a group of amateurs made an unauthorised attempt to re-erect the fallen stones, but the stones soon fell again. The stones have since been re-erected. It is not clear who re-erected them, nor when. The site suffers severe visitor erosion, as it was formerly hidden beneath heather, but is now in an area of bare trampled soil. It is regarded as one of the most damaged prehistoric sites in West Yorkshire.

== History and purpose ==
As a poorly preserved Neolithic site, its precise purpose is unknown though in all likelihood was ritualistic. The site was surveyed in 1929 by Arthur Raistrick who stated that "its position suggests very strongly a burial with a peristalith of standing stones". Others have speculated that, rather than a fully fledged stone circle, it may have been a type of ring cairn.

Dating from the Neolithic period when hunter-gatherer societies had begun to develop farming techniques, the construction of the site will have coincided with initial land clearance and deforestation for livestock grazing and therefore predates the main development of peatland.
