= Grubstones =

Stone circle in West Yorkshire, England

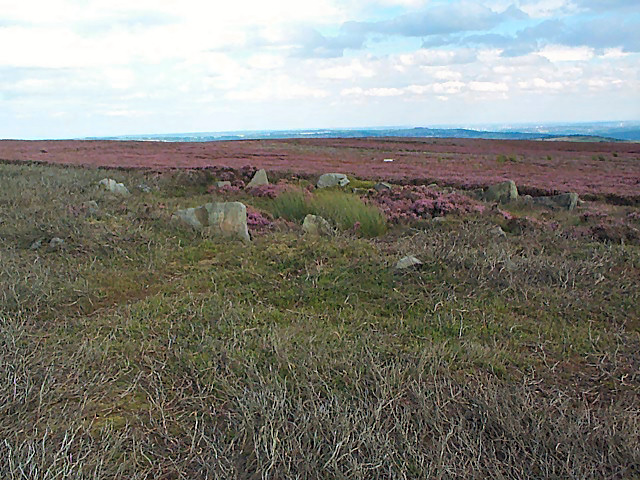

- Location within West Yorkshire
- 53.89836°N 1.79400°W
- Type: Stone circle
- Periods: Bronze Age
- Location: West Yorkshire

The Grubstones (grid reference SE136447) is a stone circle on Burley Moor in West Yorkshire, England. It is believed to be either an embanked stone circle or a ring cairn.

== Location ==
The Grubstones circle is located on Burley Moor (to the east of Ilkley Moor). It is situated below the top of the hill on a gentle south facing slope. The circle is just over 800 metres (0.5 mi) south-east of the Twelve Apostles. South-east of the circle there are several large cairns including The Skirtful of Stones.

== Description ==
The circle has a diameter of about 10 metres (30 ft). It is almost perfectly circular with twenty surviving stones. The stones are set on the inside of a low bank, about 1.8 metres (6 ft) wide. The circle has been described variously as a cairn circle, a ring cairn enclosure, or a stone circle. One third of the circle on the south side has been destroyed by shooting butts. Four large loose stones in the interior may have come from this break. The interior was excavated circa 1846 which revealed a cremation, accompanied by a flint spearhead.

In the 20th century there was additional damage in the form of a subrectangular earthwork mound said to be an "orgone accumulator". Orgone is supposed to be a vital energy or life force which informs the universe, and which can be collected and stored in an orgone accumulator for subsequent use in the treatment of illness.
