= Winterbourne Abbas =

Village and civil parish in Dorset, England

Coordinates: 50.713°N 2.541°W

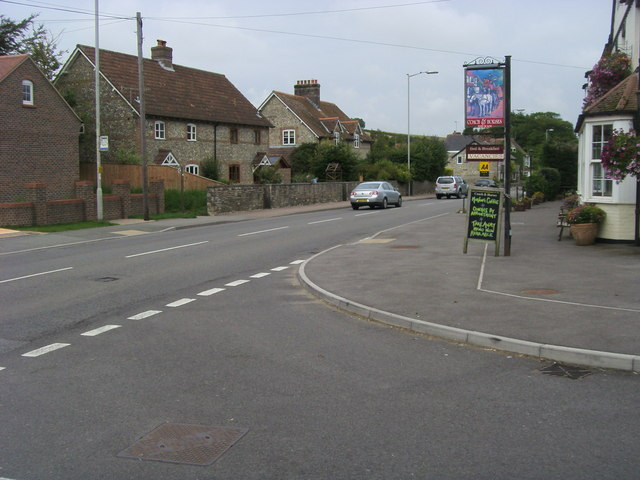
- The A35 at Winterbourne Abbas

- Location within Dorset
- Population: 355
- OS grid reference: SY618904
- Unitary authority: Dorset
- Ceremonial county: Dorset
- Region: South West
- Country: England
- Sovereign state: United Kingdom
- Post town: DORCHESTER
- Postcode district: DT2
- Police: Dorset
- Fire: Dorset and Wiltshire
- Ambulance: South Western
- UK Parliament: West Dorset

Winterbourne Abbas is a village and civil parish in south west Dorset, England, situated in a valley on the A35 road 5 miles (8.0 km) west of Dorchester. In the 2011 census the parish had a population of 355.

== History ==
In the early hours of 6 May 2023, a large fire broke out at an industrial estate outside the village. The A35 road was closed for several hours.

== The village ==
Winterbourne Abbas is a pleasant rural village, only spoilt by the heavy traffic which passes through on the A35. The Coach and Horses Inn dates from 1814 or earlier and was a coaching inn on the turnpike road from Dorchester to Bridport. The Baptist Chapel dates from 1872 and has been converted to residential use. Other notable buildings include the Old Post Office in the middle of a terrace of cottages and the Grange.

The Nine Stones stone circle lies just to the west of the village just to the south of the A35 road and surrounded by trees. It is probably the best example of a stone circle in Dorset. Also near the village are the remains of various ancient barrows and burial chambers, including Poor Lot Barrow Cemetery.

The village has a school 'Winterbourne Valley First School', taking approximately 70 pupils of 3 to 9 years of age. The school was assessed as 'Outstanding' by OFSTED in 2011.

== The church ==
The parish church is dedicated to St Mary and is a Grade I listed building, being inscribed in the register on 26 January 1956. The church is built from coursed rubble stone and flint, dressed with local stone from Ham Hill, Somerset and the Ridgeway. The roof is slate and the tower, at the west end, has three stages and is supported by buttresses. The oldest parts of the church are the thirteenth century nave and the chancel, the chancel having been rebuilt in the fourteenth century. In the fifteenth century, the nave was widened to the north and the tower and rood stair installed. In the sixteenth century the entrance to the former south chapel was blocked, and in the seventeenth century, the porch was added. The eighteenth century saw an alteration to the chancel and the addition of buttresses to the nave. There is the Royal coat of arms of Charles II dated 1661 on the chancel arch, and the Jacobean gallery is carved with the date 1701. South of the Sanctuary there is a piscina from about 1320 with a pyramidal hood and canopy supported by two figures.

== Politics ==
After 2019 structural changes to local government in England, Winterbourne Abbas is part of the Winterborne and Broadmayne ward which elects 1 member to Dorset Council.
