= Litton Cheney =

Village and civil parish in Dorset, England

Coordinates: 50.7139°N 2.6358°W

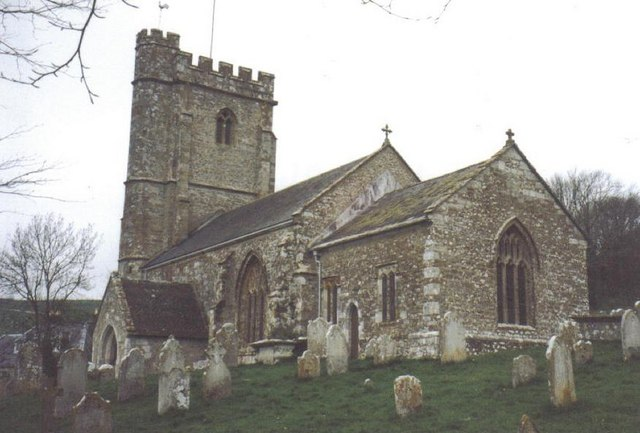
- Parish church of St Mary

- Location within Dorset
- Population: 359
- OS grid reference: SY552907
- Unitary authority: Dorset
- Ceremonial county: Dorset
- Region: South West
- Country: England
- Sovereign state: United Kingdom
- Post town: Dorchester
- Postcode district: DT2
- Police: Dorset
- Fire: Dorset and Wiltshire
- Ambulance: South Western
- UK Parliament: West Dorset
- Website: Village website

Litton Cheney is a village and civil parish in the county of Dorset in south-west England. It lies 9 miles (14 km) west of the county town Dorchester. It is sited beneath chalk hills in the valley of the small River Bride. In the 2011 census the parish had a population of 359.

On Pins Knoll, to the west of the village, was once an Iron Age settlement, excavated in 1959. On the same site, in the 4th century, there was also a Romano-British building.

The parish church of St Mary was substantially restored in 1878, though it retains features—notably the tower, chancel arch and parts of the nave and porch—from the 14th and 15th centuries and has a font bowl which is probably Norman; the site originated at this time or earlier.

From 1953 until 1979, The Old Rectory was the home of noted English engraver, designer, typographer and painter Reynolds Stone.

Litton Cheney has a small primary school 'Thorner's Church of England VA Primary School'. The school has a 'Good' OFSTED rating.

== Prehistoric monuments ==
In 1936, the archaeologists Stuart Piggott, Cecily Piggott, and W. E. V. Young came upon what they suggested was a ruined Bronze Age stone circle near to the village. This feature consisted of a circular area measuring 47 feet in diameter that was encircled by a shallow ditch. A single sarsen stone was located on the southeast of the ditch, which the Piggotts suggested may have been the last surviving stone in a circle. A further three sarsen stones were located 90 feet to the south of the circle, but their relation to it was deemed "problematic" by the Piggotts.
