= Stanton Drew stone circles =

Neolithic henge in Somerset, England

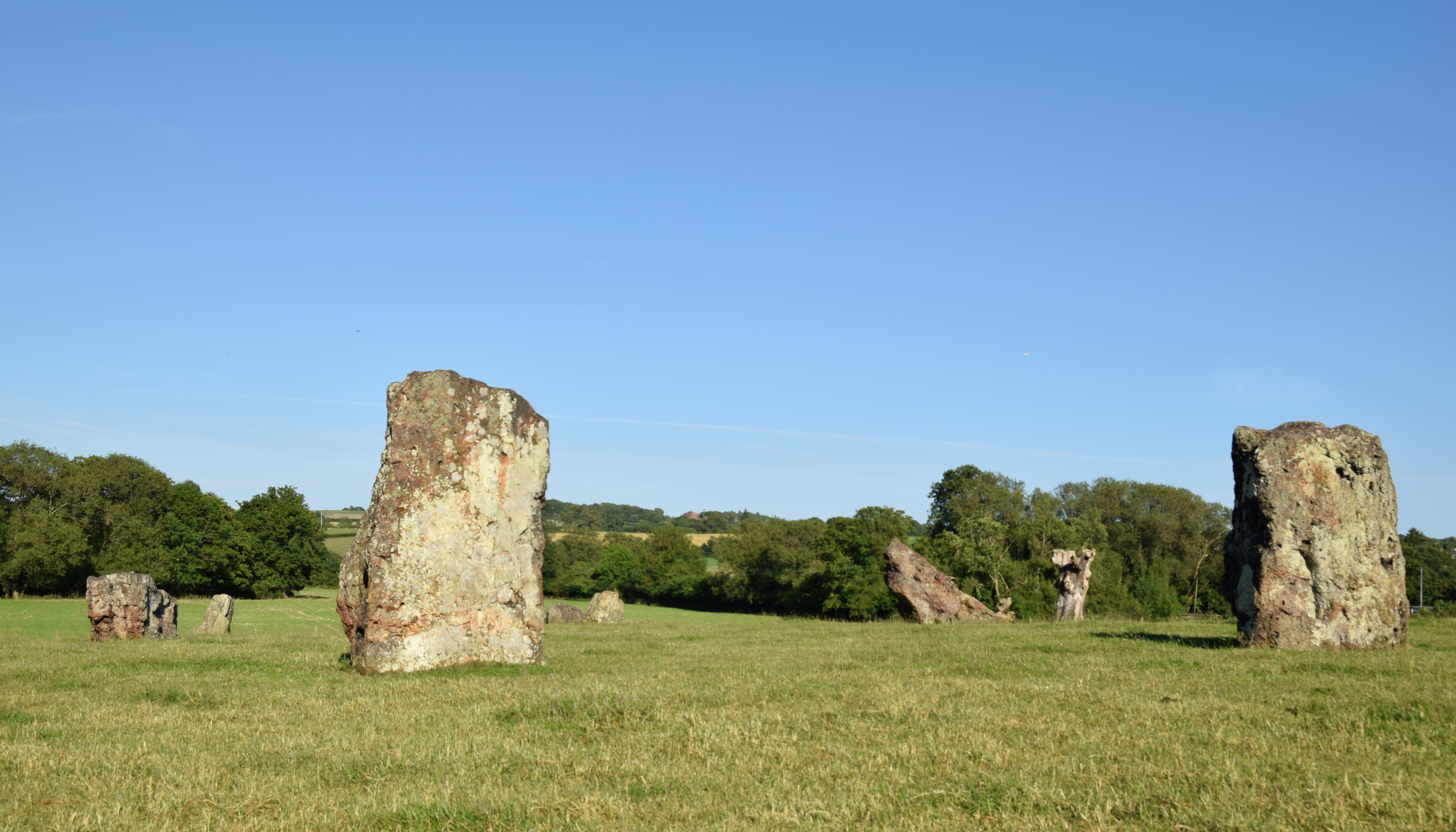

- Location within Somerset
- Interactive map of Stanton Drew stone circles
- 51°22′02″N 2°34′34″W
- Type: Henge monument
- Location: near Stanton Drew and Bristol
- Region: Somerset, England

Site notes
- Condition: intact

Aerial video of the great circle and north east circle at Stanton Drew stone circles

The Stanton Drew stone circles are just outside the village of Stanton Drew in the English county of Somerset. The largest stone circle is the Great Circle, 113 metres (371 ft) in diameter and the second largest stone circle in Britain (after Avebury); it is considered to be one of the largest Neolithic monuments to have been built. The date of construction is not known, but is thought to be between 3000 and 2000 BCE, which places it in the Late Neolithic to Early Bronze Age. It was made a scheduled monument in 1982.

The Great Circle was surrounded by a ditch and is accompanied by smaller stone circles to the northeast and southwest. There is also a group of three stones, known as The Cove, in the garden of the local pub. Slightly further from the Great Circle is a single stone, known as Hautville's Quoit. Some of the stones are still vertical, but the majority are now recumbent, and some are no longer present.

The stone circles have been studied since John Aubrey's visit in 1664, and some excavations of the site were performed in the 18th century. In the late 20th and early 21st centuries, geophysical surveys have confirmed the size of the stone circles and identified additional pits and postholes. The Cove has been shown to be around 1,000 years older than the stone circles, and so date from 4000–3000 BCE. A variety of myths and legends about the stone circles have been recorded, including one about dancers at a celebration who have been turned to stone.

== Monument ==
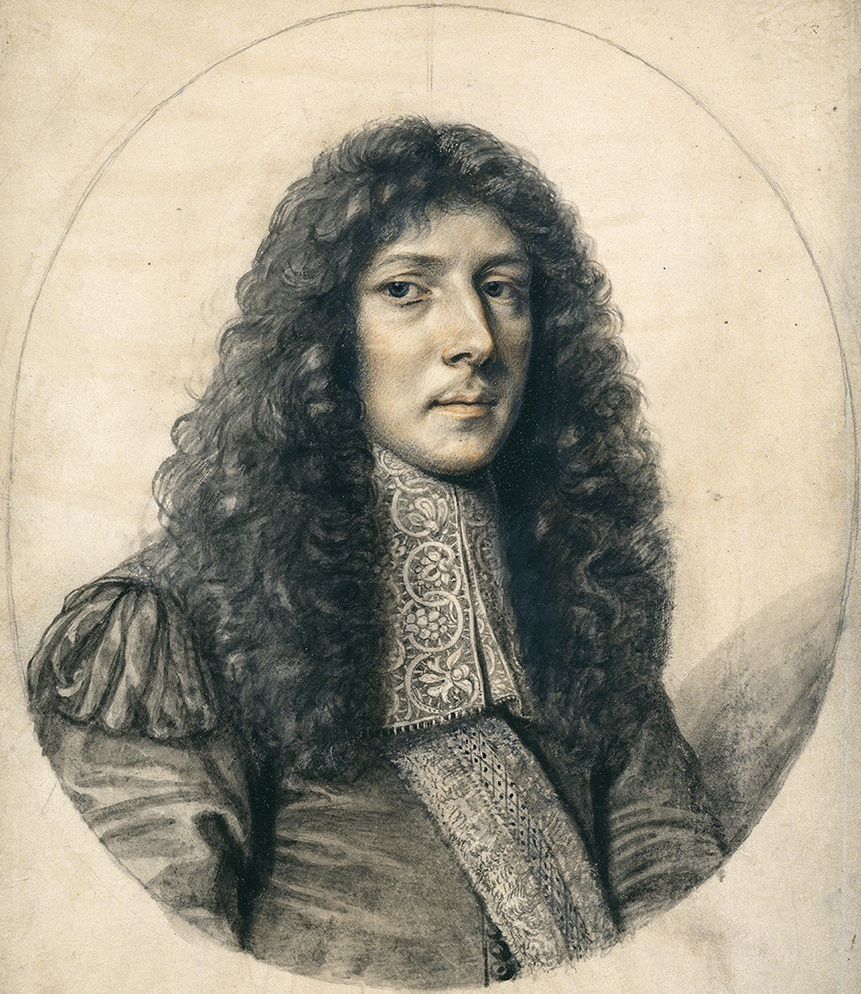
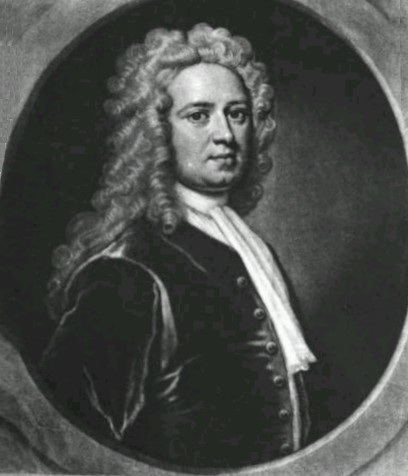
The antiquarians John Aubrey and William Stukeley both visited the stone circles at Stanton Drew

The most famous feature is the Great Circle, the second largest stone circle in Britain (after Avebury). The stone circle is 113 metres (371 ft) in diameter and probably consisted of 30 stones, of which 27 survive today. It was recorded by both John Aubrey in 1664 and William Stukeley in 1723. The Great Circle probably was surrounded by the ditch (approximately 135 metres (443 ft) outer diameter — now filled in) of a henge. The North East Circle is 30 metres (98 ft) in diameter and probably consisted of 10 or more stones, of which 8 survive today. The South West Circle is 43 metres (141 ft) in diameter, and has 12 stones surviving today. An avenue extends to the northeast of the Great Circle towards the River Chew and a second avenue meets it from the north eastern stone circle.

A (now recumbent) standing stone called Hautville's Quoit lies across the river to the north on an alignment with the centres of the Great Circle and the southern circle. It is a large stone close to Hautville Quoit Farm, recumbent since at least the mid 17th century but assumed to have originally been upright. Described by Stukeley in 1723 as being 13 feet (4.0 m) long, it is now about half that length, Leslie Grinsell suggesting that fragments have occasionally been broken off for mending the roads. Stukeley also referred to the presence of a second stone.

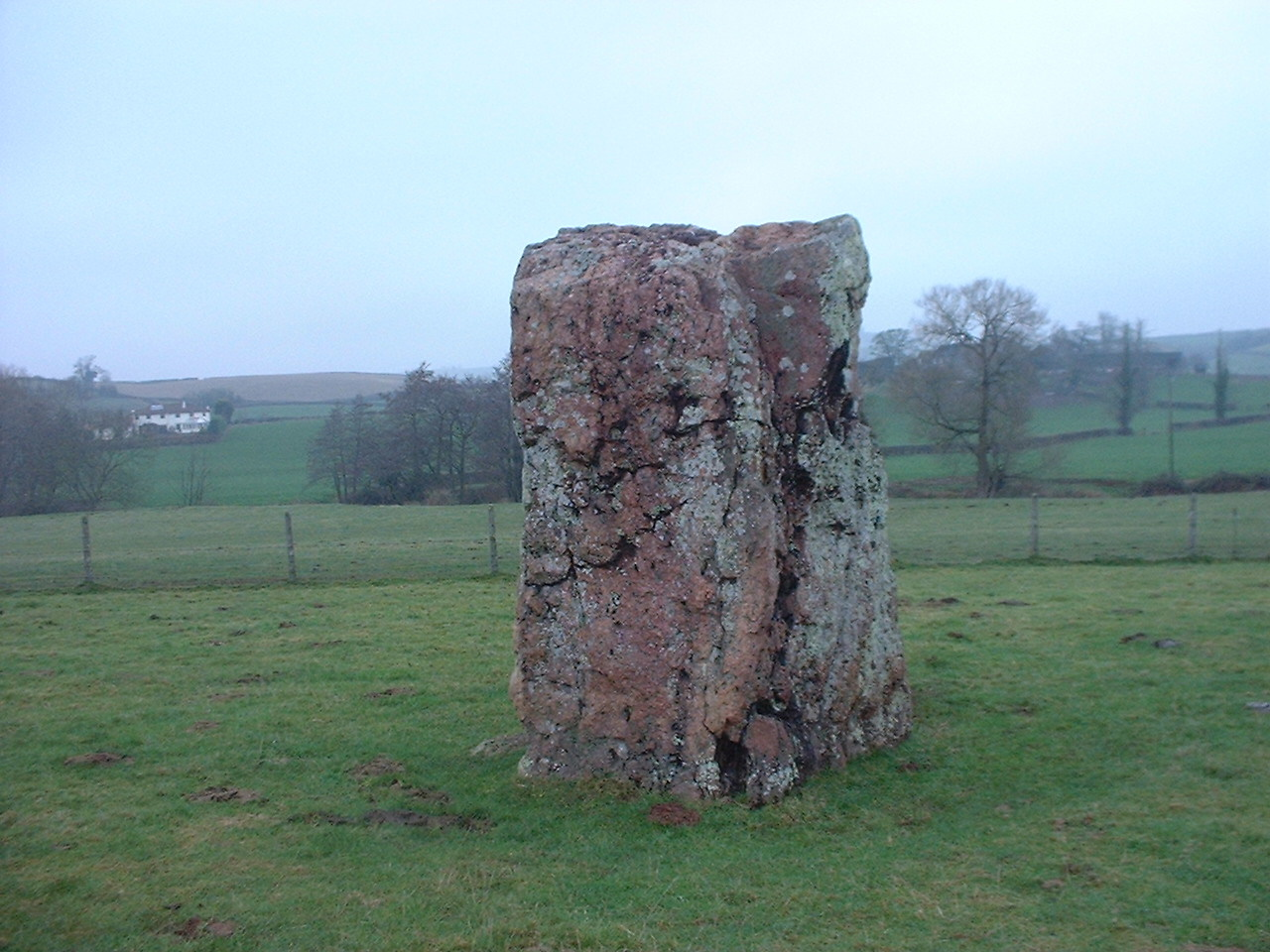
Standing Stone at Stanton Drew

Further to the west is a cove of two standing stones with a recumbent slab between them, which can be found in the garden of the Druid's Arms public house. All are of different heights, the stone to the north east being 4.4 metres (14 ft) the south western 3.1 metres (10 ft), and the north eastern 1.4 metres (4 ft 7 in). The stones of The Cove are mineralogically different from those in the nearby stone circles. A long barrow burial chamber has been found under the stones of The Cove. It is thought that this predates the erection of the stones by approximately a thousand years.

== Excavations ==
Aerial video of the south west circle at Stanton Drew stone circles

In 1740 the site was surveyed and mapped by architect, freemason and antiquarian John Wood, the Elder, who noted the different stones used. He suggested the layout was based on the Pythagorean planetary system, and thought it was used as the Druid's "University". The number and positioning of the stones according to Wood, corresponded to the Pythagorean planetary system of worlds, with three of the circles corresponding to the solar, lunar and Earth cycles. This deeply influenced his plans for a circle of 30 houses called The Circus in Bath, an ambitious architectural project completed by his son John Wood, the Younger.

When one of the stones fell in the mid 17th century, some human bones were discovered accompanied by an object described as a "round bell, like a large horse-bell". The burial date and the purpose of the bell-like object are unknown.

== Geophysical survey ==
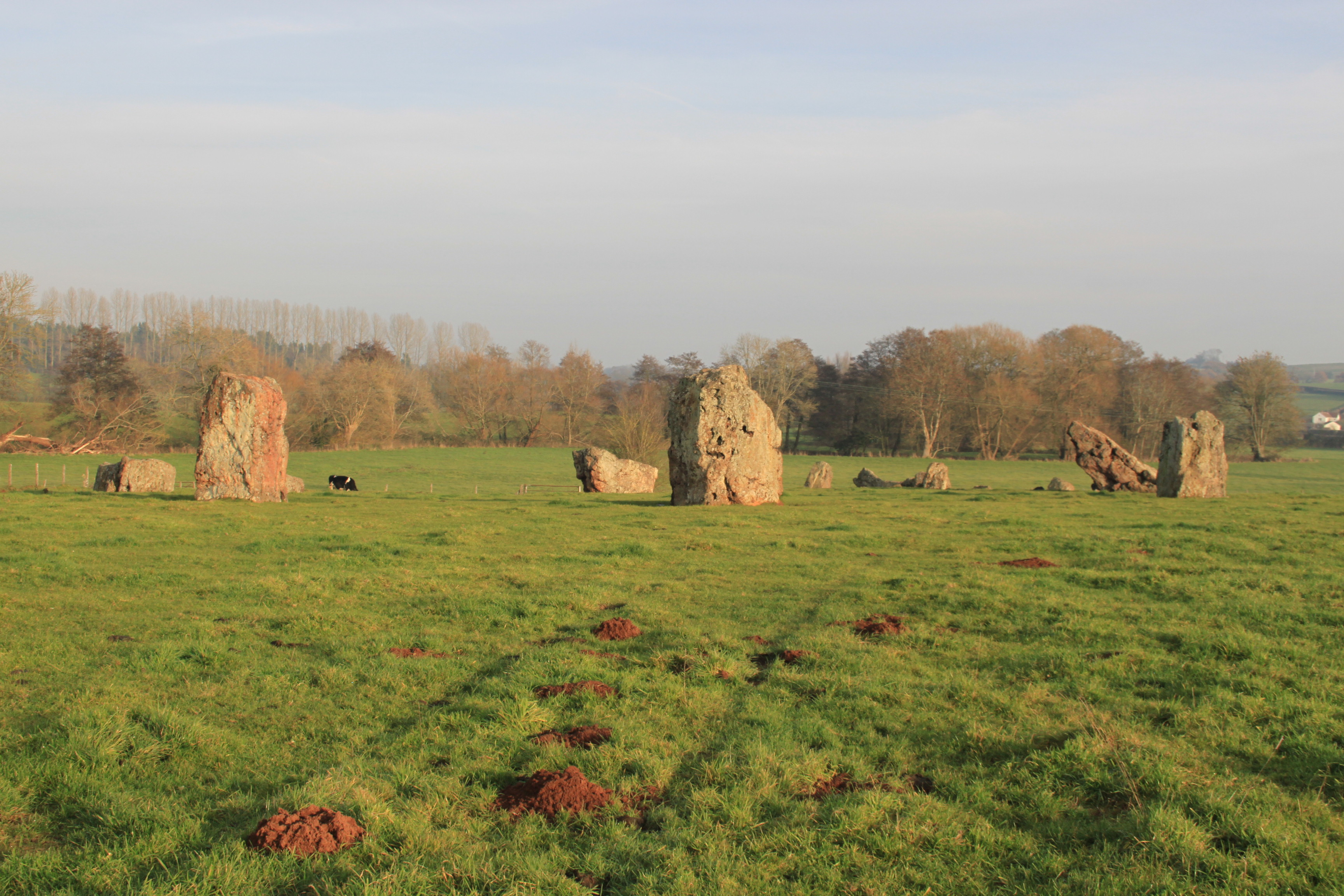
The Great Circle

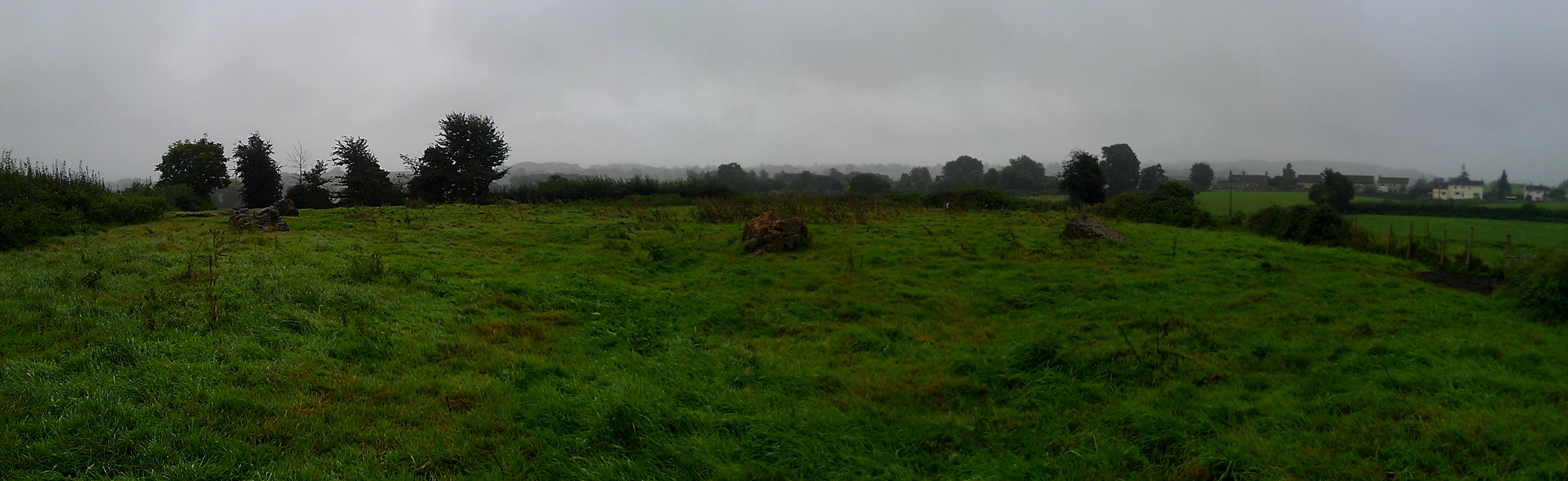
The southwest circle

Geophysical work by English Heritage in 1997 revealed a surrounding ditch and nine concentric rings of postholes within the stone circle. More than four hundred pits, 1 metre (3 ft 3 in) across and at 2.5 metres (8 ft 2 in) intervals, stood in rings at the site. The ditch is 135 metres (443 ft) in diameter and about 7 metres (23 ft) wide. A 40 metres (130 ft) wide entrance was visible on the north east side. No surrounding bank has been identified although the site awaits excavation.

The geophysical work transformed the traditional view of Stanton Drew as being a surface monument and the Great Circle is now seen as being one of the largest and most impressive Neolithic monuments to have been built. Analogous with the circles of postholes at sites at Woodhenge, Durrington Walls and The Sanctuary, it is thought that the pits would have held posts which would have either been freestanding or lintelled as they could not have supported a roof at that size. The postholes in nine concentric rings held posts up to 1 metre (3.3 ft) in diameter indicating the use of ancient trees which were sacred to the druids.

Nearby and to the north east is a smaller ring of eight stones in the centre of which the geophysical work identified four further pits. A third ring of twelve stones, measuring 43 metres (141 ft) wide, stands to the south west.

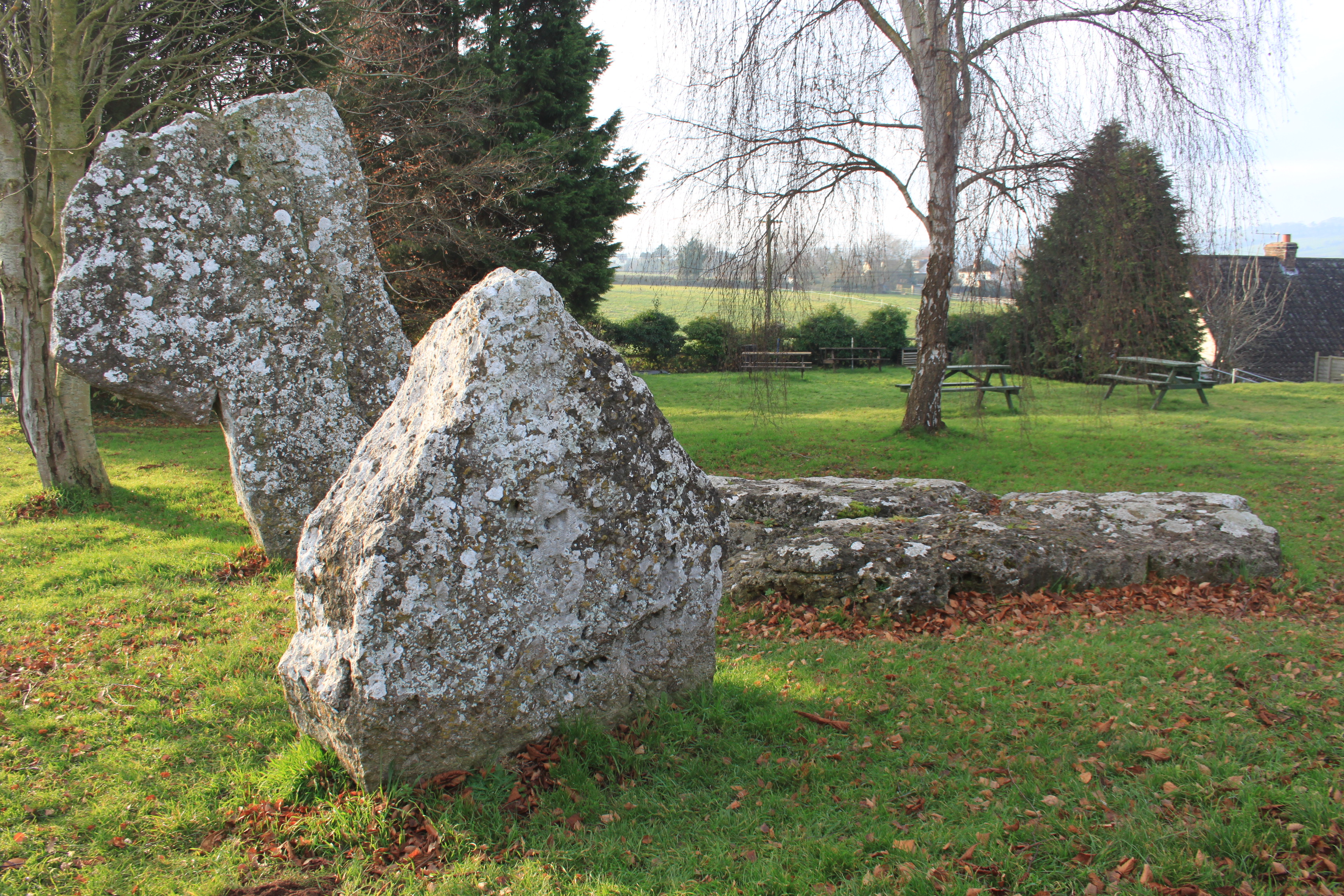
The Cove

A fluxgate gradiometer survey in July 2009 investigated standing stones in the garden of the Druids Arms public house known as The Cove, which showed that the stones date from nearly a thousand years before the stone circles. The conclusion from the study was that these upright stones are likely to have been the portals or façade of a chambered tomb.

In 2010, a further survey was carried out by Bath and Camerton Archaeological Society and the Bath and North East Somerset Archaeological Officer. This involved high data density magnetometer, resistance pseudosection profiles and photographic surveys showed a new henge entrance and further detail of post holes.

== Myths about Stanton Drew ==
A postcard from 1886 showing a Standing stone at Stanton Drew

Being a henge and stone circle site, astronomical alignments are a common theory to explain the positioning of the stones at Stanton Drew. Similarly, there are less well evidenced theories relating to ley lines.

One theory suggests the site was dedicated to funerary ritual. As a sacred site this is to be expected, but also then to be host to other significant events of the local community such as weddings and religious ceremonies. There are several local traditional stories about the megalithic complex. The best known tells how a wedding party was turned to stone: the party was held throughout Saturday, but a man clothed in black (the Devil in disguise) came and started to play his violin for the merrymakers after midnight, continuing into holy Sunday morning. When dawn broke, everybody had been turned to stone by the Demon: so the stone circles are the dancers, the avenues are the fiddlers and The Cove is the bride and the groom with the drunken churchman at their feet. They are still awaiting the Devil who promised to come back someday and play again for them.

Wade and Wade in their 1929 book Somerset suggest:

One of the curiosities of the place is Hautville's Quoit, which, to save time, should also be looked for on approaching the village. (Enter iron gate on L. a few hundred yards before reaching tollhouse, and search backwards along the hedge bordering road.) It is a large stone, which legend says was hurled by Sir J. Hautville (whose effigy is in Chew Magna Church) from the top of Maes Knoll. The famous "druidical remains" will be found near the church. About 50 yards from the entrance to the churchyard take a lane to the L. leading to an orchard: the stones will be observed in the field beyond (admission free, but field closed on Sundays). The "remains" consist of three contiguous circles. The first is of considerable area, and is marked out by twelve large stones, only three of which remain upright; a smaller circle of eight stones lies just beyond; and a third circle of eight will be found farther away in an orchard on the R. The two larger circles have each a few scattered stones thrown off as a kind of avenue. Standing apart from the circles is a curious group of three stones huddled together in a garden abutting on the churchyard, from which they can be easily seen by looking over the W. boundary wall. These mystic rings probably had the same origin (whatever that may have been) as that of the more famous circle at Avebury in Wiltshire, with which they should be compared.

The proximity of Maes Knoll is comparable with that of Silbury Hill. A ridiculous theory suggests that the monoliths were erected as a trophy after one of Arthur's victories. Arthur is connected to the site because a site in the nearby village of Camerley is reputed to be the location of Camelot in an oral tradition. The stones are of a reddish hue similar to that described in the Arthurian legend as connected to Camelot and to a sword that was seen in a stone near to Camelot. The country story is that a local wedding once took place on a Sunday, when the frivolous guests would insist on winding up with a dance. The penalty for a "Sabbath" thus "profaned" was the prompt transformation of the bridal party into stone. Hence the local appellation of "The fiddlers and the maids".

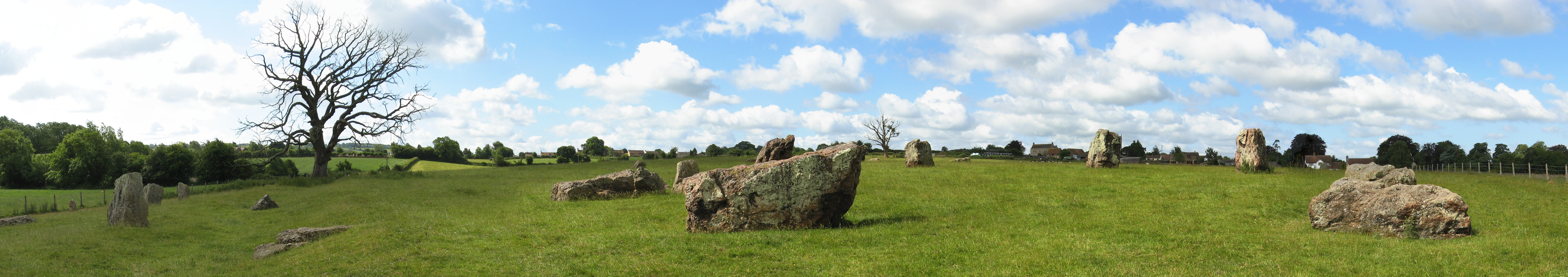
North East Circle

== Bibliography ==
- Burl, Aubrey (1993). From Carnac to Callanish: Prehistoric Stone Rows of Britain, Ireland and Brittany. Yale University Press. p. 187. ISBN 978-0-300-05575-7.
- David, Andrew (28 April 1998). "Stanton Drew". PAST the Newsletter of the Prehistoric Society. 71 (1851): 584. Bibcode:1905Natur..71..584L. doi:10.1038/071584a0. S2CID 4059455. Archived from the original on 21 July 2013.
- Dymond, Charles William (1877). "The megalithic antiquities at Stanton Drew". Journal of the British Archaeological Association. 33 (3): 297–307. doi:10.1080/00681288.1877.11888044. Archived from the original on 23 September 2015.
- Elliot, Kirsten (2004). The myth maker: John Wood 1704–1754. Akeman Press. ISBN 978-0-9546138-2-2.
- Haycock, David Boyd (2002). William Stukeley: Science, Religion and Archaeology in Eighteenth-Century England. Boydell Press. p. 220. ISBN 978-0-85115-864-8.
- Hutton, Ronald (2009). Blood and Mistletoe: The History of the Druids in Britain. Yale University Press. ISBN 978-0-300-14485-7.
- McIntosh, Jane (2009). Handbook of Life in Prehistoric Europe. Oxford University Press. p. 266. ISBN 978-0-19-538476-5.
- Pollard, Joshua (2008). "Chapter 4 Neolithic and Early Bronze Age". In Webster, C.J. (ed.). The Archaeology of South West England (PDF). Somerset County Council. ISBN 978-0-86183-392-4. Archived from the original (PDF) on 2 December 2013.
- Seyer, Samuel (1821). Memoirs Historical and Topographical of Bristol and Its Neighbourhood: From the Earliest Period Down to the Present Time, Volume 1.
- Strong, Gordon (2008). Stanton Drew and its ancient stone circles. Wooden Books. ISBN 978-1-904263-73-9.
- Strong, Gordon (2012). The Sacred Stone Circles of Stanton Drew. Skylight Press. ISBN 978-1-908011-58-9.
