= Peggy Guido =

English archaeologist (1912–1994)

Peggy Guido FSA FSA Scot
- Born: Cecily Margaret Preston; 5 August 1912; Beckenham, Kent, England
- Died: 8 September 1994 (aged 82); Bath, Somerset, England
- Education: UCL Institute of Archaeology
- Known for: Work on prehistoric settlements
- Spouses: Stuart Piggott (m. 1936; div. 1956) Luigi Guido (m. 1957; div. 1960)
- Scientific career
- Fields: Archaeology; prehistory

Cecily Margaret Guido, FSA, FSA Scot (née Preston; 5 August 1912 – 8 September 1994), also known as Peggy Piggott, was an English archaeologist, prehistorian, and finds specialist. Her career in British archaeology spanned sixty years, and she is recognised for her field methods, her field-leading research into prehistoric settlements (hillforts and roundhouses), burial traditions, and artefact studies (particularly Iron Age to Anglo-Saxon glass beads), as well as her high-quality and rapid publication, contributing more than 50 articles and books to her field between the 1930s and 1990s.

== Early life and education ==
Guido was born Cecily Margaret Preston on 5 August 1912 in Beckenham, Kent. She was the daughter of Elsie Marie Fidgeon – whose father was of independent means – and Arthur Gurney Preston, a Cambridge-educated engineer and wealthy ironmaster, who is also recorded as of independent means at the time of her birth. The family home was a twenty-room mansion, Wood Lodge, in West Wickham, on the line of a Roman road. Her mother "ran away" from the family home when Peggy was five, and this was followed by divorce proceedings which started in 1918. Following the completion of the divorce in 1920, her mother married the co-respondent of the divorce (i.e. the other party in accusations of adultery), Surgeon Captain Percival James Bodington, a British Army medical officer. That year, her father drowned in Cornwall, which the coroner recorded as an accidental death. Her father had appointed his brother, Edwin Mumford Preston, as guardian for his children, and so Peggy and her siblings were then brought up by Edwin and his wife.

As a child, Guido had an interest in Roman coins. As a young woman, she met and began excavating with Mortimer Wheeler and Tessa Verney Wheeler, spending her 21st birthday digging the Roman town of Verulamium (in 1933). She was particularly fond of Tessa, and spoke of her with great affection, dedicating her glass beads monograph to her memory. In 1935, she was photographed working on the Whitehawk Camp ceramics with E. Cecil Curwen. From 1935 to 1936, Guido studied archaeology at the Institute of Archaeology in London, where she was awarded a postgraduate diploma in Western European Prehistory. It was here that she met her first husband, Stuart Piggott, whom she married on 12 November 1936.

== Career ==
=== Early interests ===
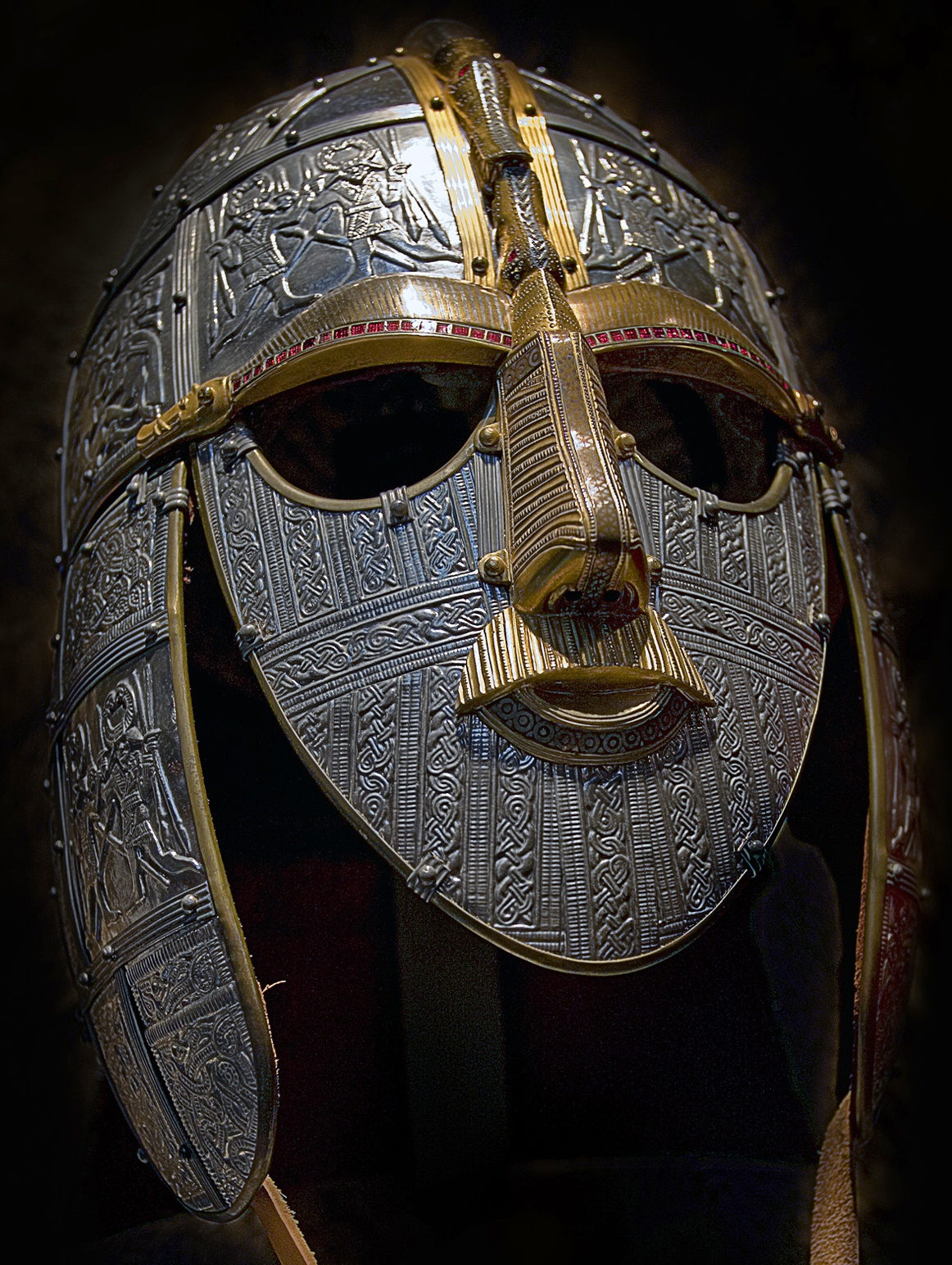
Sutton Hoo Helmet Reconstructed

Guido began her archaeological career by working on the Early Iron Age. She began by writing up the rescue excavation of an Early Iron Age site at Southcote (Berkshire), which appeared in the Proceedings of the Prehistoric Society in 1937, and publishing the pottery from Iron Age Theale the following year. In 1938–39, she worked on The Prehistoric Society's first research excavation at the Early Iron Age type-site of Little Woodbury (Wiltshire). She worked here with Gerhard Bersu, who seems to have been as great an influence on Guido as the Wheelers. In 1939, Guido published a further Early Iron Age site at Langton Matravers (Dorset), greatly enhancing knowledge of a period that by then had only just begun to be elucidated.

Guido was a skilled excavator and heavily involved in the high-profile excavation of the Anglo-Saxon boat burial at Sutton Hoo (in 1939) with Charles Phillips.

=== Bronze Age ===
However, Guido's own excavations mostly focused on the Bronze Age. The first excavation she directed (in 1937) at the age of 25 was the Middle Bronze Age barrow and urnfield cemetery at Latch Farm (Hampshire); its publication the following year also added significantly to the gazetteer of cremation urns known for the period.

During the 1940s, she was at the height of her productivity, producing an average of two publications each year – often for the national journal Proceedings of the Prehistoric Society, as well as for notable regional societies. At this time, she published on several important Bronze Age monument types including Bronze Age enclosures (Wiltshire), including the well-known hilltop enclosure site of Ram's Hill (Berkshire) and stone circles (Dorset), including the excavation of eighteen barrows (Hampshire and Wiltshire), as well as others on Crichel and Launceston Downs (Dorset).

=== Late Bronze Age ===
Towards the end of the war period, she turned her attention to understanding prehistoric linear earthwork sites (Hampshire) as well as producing a detailed study of the Grim's Ditch earthwork complex (Wiltshire). In the later 1940s, Guido began to focus on the Late Bronze Age period and also started producing specialist artefact reports, in particular on Late Bronze Age metalwork. Notably, she produced a comprehensive study of British razors, a report on a Late Bronze Age metalwork hoard from Blackrock (Sussex), and individual artefact studies, as well as a report on a Late Bronze Age burial at Orrock (Fife). It was at this point that she began to develop her specialist interest in glass beads.

=== Hillfort excavations ===
Guido was awarded funding in the late 1940s by the Society of Antiquaries of Scotland to test the model of Iron Age settlement development in southern Scotland in response to a Council for British Archaeology policy statement regarding the misleading nature of settlement classification from surface remains. This was an early attempt to move settlement archaeology beyond typological study. In her upland excavations of Hownam Rings (in 1948), Hayhope Knowe (in 1949), and Bonchester Hill (in 1950) – each site published in the same year it was excavated – she tested and refined the CBA model, providing a relative chronological framework for later prehistoric settlement in southern Scotland. In the days before the application of radiocarbon dating to archaeological material, this was a huge leap forward for prehistoric studies.

The late 1940s and early 1950s marks Guido as one of the most important British prehistorians. In this period, she excavated no less than six hillforts, and it was her work in the field of hillfort studies which is considered some of her most influential. Hownam Rings (1948) in particular became the type-site for hillfort development, known as the Hownam Paradigm, remaining valid to this day. Guido worked with her husband on her sixth hillfort excavation: the site of Braidwood Fort (1951–55).

=== Roundhouse excavations ===
Beyond elucidating relative settlement chronologies, Guido's reconstruction drawing of the Hayhope roundhouse was to become the modern standard. Although Little Woodbury had been successful in exposing an Early Iron Age roundhouse, the report had been remarkably inconclusive with respect to its reconstruction. Guido simplified this in line with the earlier Northumbrian work of Wake and Kilbride-Jones, which went on to influence Brewster at Staple Howe. The Hayhope-Hownam excavations also suggested the potential for a typology of prehistoric houses – as later undertaken by Richard Feachem and George Jobey, both greatly influenced by Guido's work. On the strength of her contribution to British prehistory, Guido became an elected Fellow of the Society of Antiquaries of London in 1944, at the age of 32. She also became a Fellow of the Society of Antiquaries of Scotland in 1946.

=== 1950s and 1960s ===
By the early 1950s, Guido was already working towards what we now consider an understanding of everyday life in prehistory: recording the positions of finds on plans and considering ritual deposits. It is in the work of Guido that we see the advent of modern settlement studies, through her excavation strategy and her work on hillforts and roundhouses.

Between 1951 and 1953, alongside her Scottish fieldwork, she also published a series of English sites, including the hilltop site of Carl Wark (near Sheffield), the Dorchester-on-Thames (Oxfordshire) Neolithic complex, important for its work on henge monuments, with R.J.C. Atkinson and Nancy Sanders, and her wartime excavation of an Iron Age barrow burial (Hampshire). It was at this point that she turned her attention to wetland archaeology and arguably her most technically skilled excavation: the crannog site of Milton Loch (Dumfries and Galloway), with its well-preserved timber roundhouse (published in 1953).

Guido produced one of her final field reports for British prehistory in 1954 – a note on ceramics from a dun (on Tiree) – in the year that her relationship with Stuart ended. She worked with him on the site of Braidwood Fort until their twenty-year marriage was annulled in 1956. She then moved to Sicily, briefly reverting to her maiden name of Preston. She used it in the translation that she and her second husband Luigi Guido made of Bernabo Brea's Sicily before the Greeks (1957). In the 1960s and early 1970s, she produced four guidebooks on Italian archaeology: on Sardinia (1963), Syracuse (1965), Sicily (1967), and on southern Italy as a whole (1972); as well as reviews of notable Italian archaeological works in the pages of the British journal Antiquity.

=== Glass beads ===
Returning to archaeology, in the 1970s, Guido settled down to researching glass beads and travelled around Britain to see excavated examples as well as those in museums. In 1978, she published her first volume on ancient British glass beads, an accomplished work covering both prehistoric and Roman periods (dedicated to Tessa Verney Wheeler) after which she began her Anglo-Saxon volume. She co-founded the Bead Study Trust (in 1981), and the Peggy Guido Fund for Research on Beads. From the 1970s onwards, she produced dozens of specialist reports on beads (for sites including Lankhills Winchester, Colchester, Wilsford, Cadbury-Congresbury, Conderton Camp, Castle Copse – with many more not yet in print). Her bead research saw her driving a camper-van across Europe during the 1980s. Her volume on Anglo-Saxon beads was published posthumously (by Martin Welch) in 1999. Both volumes remain the primary reference works on the topic.

=== Curator and later career ===
In 1977, Guido moved from Brock Street, Bath to Long Street in Devizes and became involved with Devizes Museum, now the Wiltshire Museum. At the age of 70, she turned her attention again to prehistoric field archaeology, publishing a reconsideration of the Inner Enclosure at Figsbury Rings, Wiltshire with Isobel Smith (in 1982) and conducting a fieldwalking survey of Cow Down at Longbridge Deverill with Eve Machin (in 1982–83), to assess plough damage. In 1984, she was elected to the position of Vice-President of the Wiltshire Archaeological and Natural History Society.

=== Appraisal ===
Guido was a highly skilled excavator and a prolific researcher. Throughout her career, her excavation methods were known as tactical and efficient, digging a site per year with strategy chosen for site objectives. Her most influential site in this respect was that of Hayhope Knowe in the Scottish Borders (1949) where she opened 520 sq. m in targeted open-area trenches to investigate three houses and the enclosure sequence. This was one of the first times such an approach had been used for the northern Iron Age. Guido's method had taken the best of both the Wheeler and Bersu schools of excavation, scaled down for rapid assessment.

Her archaeological career spanned sixty years and was defined by high field standards, and rapid, high-quality publication. Described as having "inexhaustible powers of leadership and enthusiasm", she had been undeterred by the demands of rescue excavation for the military. She produced as many as fifty works for British prehistory, in particular advancing the fields of Bronze Age burial traditions, Late Bronze Age artefact studies, Later Bronze Age and Iron Age settlement studies (especially roundhouse architecture and hillfort chronologies), and of course Prehistoric, Roman, and Anglo-Saxon glass beads. In addition to her own research during World War II, Guido directed numerous rescue excavations for the Ancient Monuments Department of the Ministry of Works, on sites commandeered for defence purposes.

== Personal life ==
On 12 November 1936, Margaret married the archaeologist Stuart Piggott (1910–1996); they had met while students at the Institute of Archaeology in London. By 1954, their relationship was over, and they divorced in 1956. In 1957, she married Luigi Guido, whom she had met while undertaking research in Sicily. Two years later, her husband had a psychotic breakdown and she spent six months caring for him while he was strapped to his bed. At the end of this period, he left her and moved back to Sicily. She never heard from him again.

In retirement, she cared for A. W. Lawrence, a classical scholar and younger brother of T. E. Lawrence. After the death of his wife in 1986, Lawrence moved in with Margaret and they lived together until his death in 1991. In her final years, Margaret regularly visited her former husband, Stuart Piggott, who had retired to Wantage. In 1987, Piggott had joined Margaret in shared tenure as President of the Wiltshire Archaeological and Natural History Society – offices they each held until their deaths.

Margaret Guido died in a hospital in Bath on 8 September 1994.

== Legacy ==
Her name lives on in Margaret Guido's Charitable Trust, administered by Coutts of the Strand, which provides grants to charities and voluntary bodies, largely those to do with the arts. A bequest to the National Trust helped them to acquire the meadowland surrounding the monument of Silbury Hill, Wiltshire.

Wiltshire Museum, Devizes, has some of her finds and implements.

Guido is given a prominent role in a 2007 novel on the subject of the Sutton Hoo excavation, The Dig, written by her nephew, John Preston. She is portrayed by Lily James in the film adaptation of the same name, released on Netflix in January 2021.

== Selected works ==
- Piggott, C. M. and Seaby, W. A. (1937). Early Iron Age site at Southcote, Reading. Proceedings of the Prehistoric Society 3, 43–57.
- Piggott, C. M. (1938). A Middle Bronze Age barrow and Deverel-Rimbury urnfield at Latch Farm, Christchurch, Hampshire. Proceedings of the Prehistoric Society 4, 169–187.
- Piggott, C. M. (1943). Excavation of fifteen barrows in the New Forest, 1941–2. Proceedings of the Prehistoric Society 9, 1–27.
- Piggott, C. M. (1946). The Late Bronze Age razors of the British Isles. Proceedings of the Prehistoric Society 12, 121–141.
- Piggott, C. M. (1948). Excavations at Hownam Rings, Roxburghshire, 1948. Proceedings of the Society of Antiquaries of Scotland 82, 193–225.
- Piggott, C. M. (1949). The Iron Age settlement at Hayhope Knowe, Roxburghshire: Excavations 1949. Proceedings of the Society of Antiquaries of Scotland 83, 45–67.
- Piggott, C. M. (1949). A Late Bronze Age hoard from Blackrock in Sussex and its significance. Proceedings of the Prehistoric Society 15, 107–121.
- Piggott, C. M. (1950). The excavations at Bonchester Hill, 1950. Proceedings of the Society of Antiquaries of Scotland 84, 118–137.
- Piggott, C. M. (1951). Carl Wark, Hathersage. Antiquity 25, 210–212.
- Piggott, C. M. (1953). Milton Loch crannog I: a native house of the 2nd century A.D. in Kirkcudbrightshire. Proceedings of the Society of Antiquaries of Scotland 87, 134–152.
- Guido, Margaret (1963). Sardinia. London: Thames and Hudson.
- Guido, Margaret (1972). Southern Italy: an archaeological guide. London: Faber and Faber. ISBN 978-0571084968.
- Guido, Margaret (1977). Sicily: an archaeological guide. London: Faber and Faber. ISBN 9780571108817.
- Guido, Margaret (1978). The Glass Beads of the Prehistoric and Roman Periods in Britain and Ireland. London: Society of Antiquaries of London. ISBN 9780854312320.
- Guido, M. and Walsh, M. (1999). The Glass Beads of Anglo-Saxon England c. AD 400–700: A preliminary visual classification of the more definitive and diagnostic types. Reports of the Research Committee of the Society of Antiquaries of London, No. 58. Woodbridge: Boydell Press.
