= List of stone circles =

This is an incomplete photographic list of stone circles.

== Britain, Ireland, and the Channel Islands ==
Aubrey Burl's gazetteer lists 1,303 stone circles in Britain, Ireland and Brittany (France). Most of these are found in Scotland, with 508 sites recorded. There are 343 on the island of Ireland; 316 in England; 81 in Wales; 49 in Brittany (France); and 6 in the Channel Isles.

=== Channel Islands ===
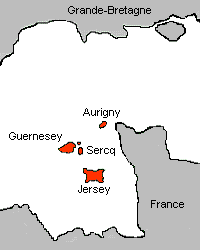
The British Channel Islands

Aubrey Burl records six sites in the Channel Islands, four on Guernsey and two on Jersey. All six are Cist-in-Circle monuments, which are influenced by chambered tomb design. Their relationship with the stone circle tradition of Britain, Ireland and Brittany is unclear.

Guernsey		Le Creux ès Faïes, cist-in-circle, semicircular stone wall supporting a mound containing a passage grave	49.4566°N 2.6557°W
Guernsey	Photo see Megalith Guernsey	Steinkiste von L’Islet (de), cist-in-circle, stone cist in a circle of irregularly shaped stones	49.48865°N 2.5448°W
Guernsey		Les Fouillages (fr/de), a passage grave in a triangular enclosure of small irregularly shaped stones	49.49747°N 2.53775°W
Jersey		Ville-ès-Nouaux	49.196389°N 2.130556°W

=== England ===
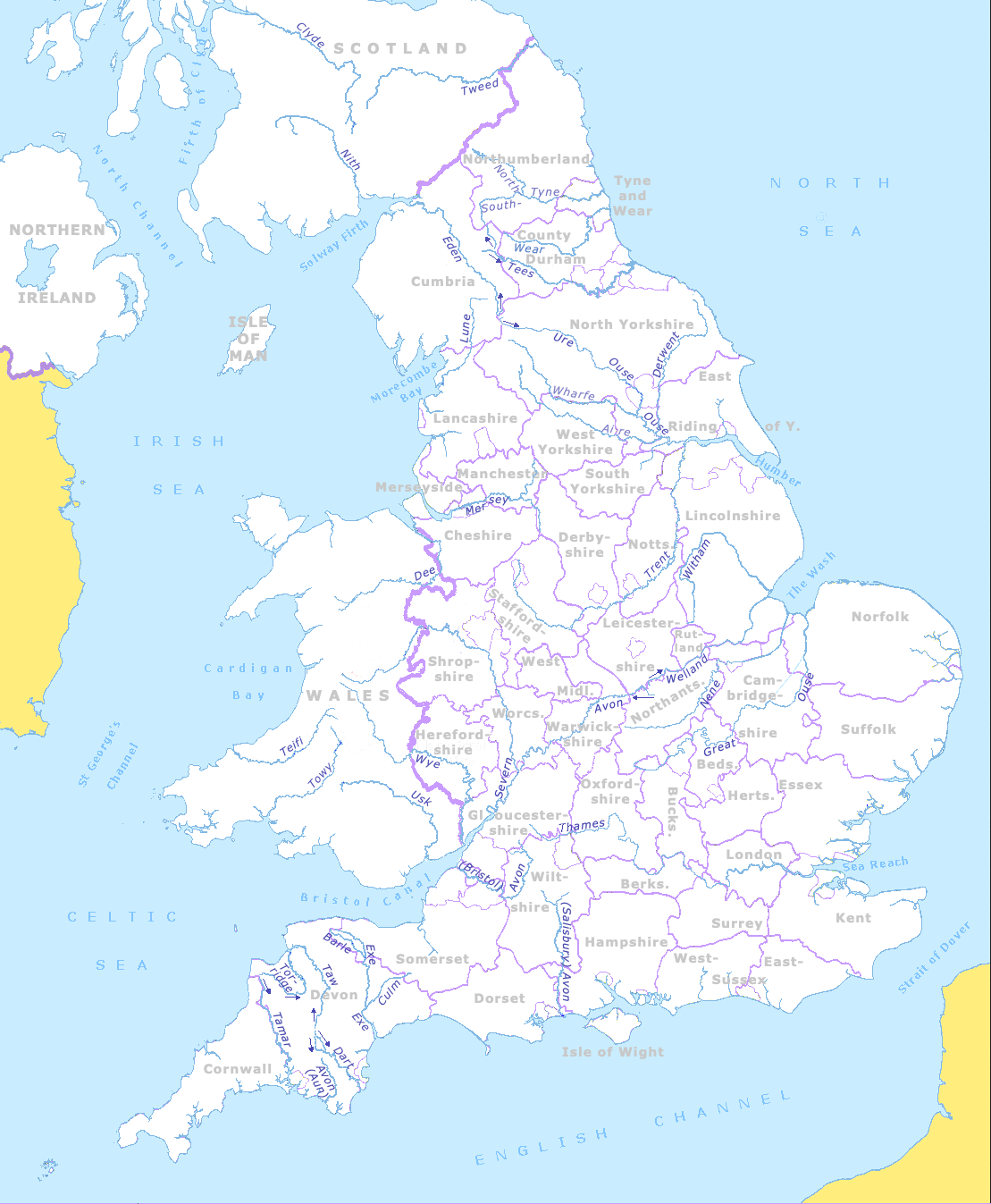
Ceremonial Counties of England

==== South East England ====
There are no ancient stone circles in Kent or Sussex.

Essex	The stones lying around the church of Alphamstone might be relics of a stone circle, the only one on the peninsula between the Thames estuary and the Wash.	51.9858469°N 0.7347047°E
Oxfordshire	The King's Men, one of three monuments that make up the Rollright Stones, found near the village of Long Compton	51.97552°N 1.57068°W

==== East Midlands ====
===== Derbyshire =====
Arbor Low, near Youlgreave	
Barbrook One, on Ramsley Moor in the Peak District	SK27857558.
Doll Tor, near Birchover	
Hordron Edge, on the edge of Moscar Moor	SK2152486851.
Nine Ladies, nine stones on Stanton Moor	
Nine Stones Close, between Alport and Winster	SK225626.

==== Yorkshire and the Humber ====
North Yorkshire		Fancarl Top stone circle, near River Wharfe, circle of 5 stones and a central stone	HE 1008781; SE0642863048; 54.063359°N 1.903242°W
North Yorkshire	no appropriate photo available	Healey Stone Circle	SE170810; 54.22444°N 1.740756°E
North Yorkshire	no appropriate photo available	Cairnfield on Standingstones Rigg, including a cup and ring, Cloughton Moor, Harwood Dale	HE 1019799; SE 98047 96859, SE 98140 96989; 54.358911°N 0.489729°W
North Yorkshire		High Bridestones on Sleights Moor, Eskdaleside cum Ugglebarnby	HE 1004892; NZ8499904635; 54.430055°N 0.691259°W
North Yorkshire		Yockenthwaite stone circle	HE 1008772; SD8995779376; 54.209911°N 2.155160°W
West Yorkshire		Twelve Apostles (of Yorkshire)	SE12614506

==== North East England ====
County Durham	Lune Head Stone Circle	54.57876°N 2.234037°W
Northumberland	Duddo Five Stones, 6 km (4 mi) south of the Scottish border, formerly known as the Four Stones	55.68677°N 2.112023°W
Northumberland	The Goatstones, a Bronze-age four-poster near the village of Wark on Tyne	55.067372°N 2.269297°W
Northumberland	Threestoneburn Stone Circle, a circle of 16 stones in Threestoneburn Wood, near the village of Ilderton	55.4783°N 2.04692°W

==== North West England ====
===== Cumbria =====
Birkrigg, two non-concentric circles, 3 km (2 mi) south of Ulverston	SD 29247396
Brat's Hill, the largest of the Burnmoor stone circles, 1.6 km (1 mi) south of Boot	
Castlerigg, a 33-metre-diameter (108 ft) ring consisting of 38 stones	
Gamelands, near Orton, Eden	NY640081.
Kinniside, a reconstructed stone circle of 11 stones	NY060140.
Long Meg and Her Daughters, about 51 stones set in an oval shape measuring 100 m (330 ft) on its long axis	
Low Longrigg circles, two of the Burnmoor stone circles, 2 km (1 mi) south of Boot	
Oddendale, part of the Shap Stone Avenue monuments	(NY59201290).
Swinside, a nearly perfect circle in Lake District	
White Moss stone circles, two of the Burnmoor stone circles: 1.6 km (1 mi) south of Boot	

==== Lancashire ====
Cheetham Close, Bronze Age site on the moors of Egerton, Bolton.

==== Shropshire ====
Mitchell's Fold, ring of 30 stones, 15 still standing

Whetstone Circle, partial circle as stones removed for local building

Hoarstone Circle, utilised for local wedding celebrations

==== South West England ====
===== Cornwall =====
Boscawen-Un, stone circle with a leaning pillar in its interior.
Boskednan, partially restored stone circle near Boskednan, about 6 kilometres (4 miles) northwest of the town of Penzance.
Craddock Moor, near Minions on Bodmin Moor, 800 m (1/2 mi) northwest of The Hurlers.
Duloe, in the village of Duloe, 8 km (5 mi) from Looe.
Emblance Downs stone circles, a pair of circles in the parish of St. Breward on Bodmin Moor.
Fernacre, on the slopes of the De Lank River, 2 km (1 1/4 mi) northeast of St Breward on Bodmin Moor.
The Hurlers, a group of three stone circles on Bodmin Moor.
The Merry Maidens, near St Buryan in West Penwith.
Nine Stones, Altarnun, 3 km (2 mi) south southeast of Altarnun, 11 km (7 mi) west of Launceston on Bodmin Moor.
Stannon, near St Breward on Bodmin Moor.
Tregeseal East, also known as the Tregeseal Dancing Stones, near St Just in West Penwith.
Trippet stones, Manor Common in Blisland, 9 km (5.6 mi) north northeast of Bodmin on Bodmin Moor.

===== Devon =====
Brisworthy stone circle
Grey Wethers stone circles
Ringmoor Down
Scorhill
Shovel Down
Tottiford Reservoir
Yellowmead stone circle

===== Dorset =====
Kingston Russell, an 18-stone Bronze Age circle near Abbotsbury.	50°41′18.7″N 2°35′56.2″W
Rempstone stone circle, a damaged stone circle near Corfe Castle in Dorset. It is located next to the B3351 road on the Isle of Purbeck	SY994820.
The Nine Stones, a small nine stone circle near Winterbourne Abbas	

===== Somerset =====
Large stones, some lying and some standing on end in grassy area.	Stanton Drew, one of three circles located near the village of Stanton Drew.
	Withypool Stone Circle, on the Exmoor moorland, near the village of Withypool. Only the stones present on the two ends of the circle are visible.

===== Wiltshire =====
Avebury, large stone circle surround the village of Avebury.
Stonehenge, World Heritage site.

=== Wales ===
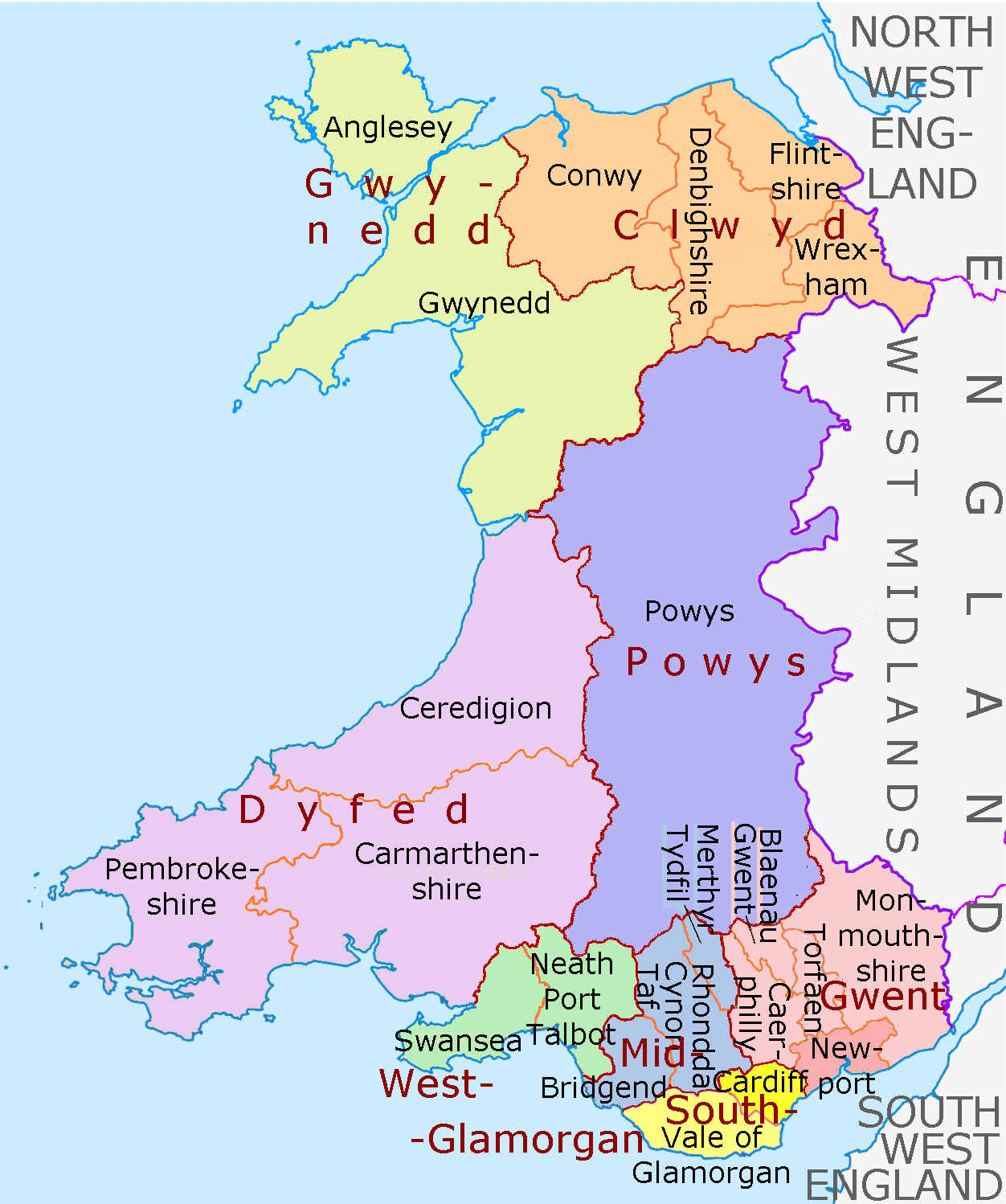
Counties and Preserved Counties of Wales

Moel Tŷ Uchaf near Llandrillo, Denbighshire.	52.92°N 3.40°W
Bryn Cader Faner, Gwynedd	52.8982°N 4.0114°W
Bryn Gwyn stones, Anglesey	52.8982°N 4.0114°W

=== Scotland ===
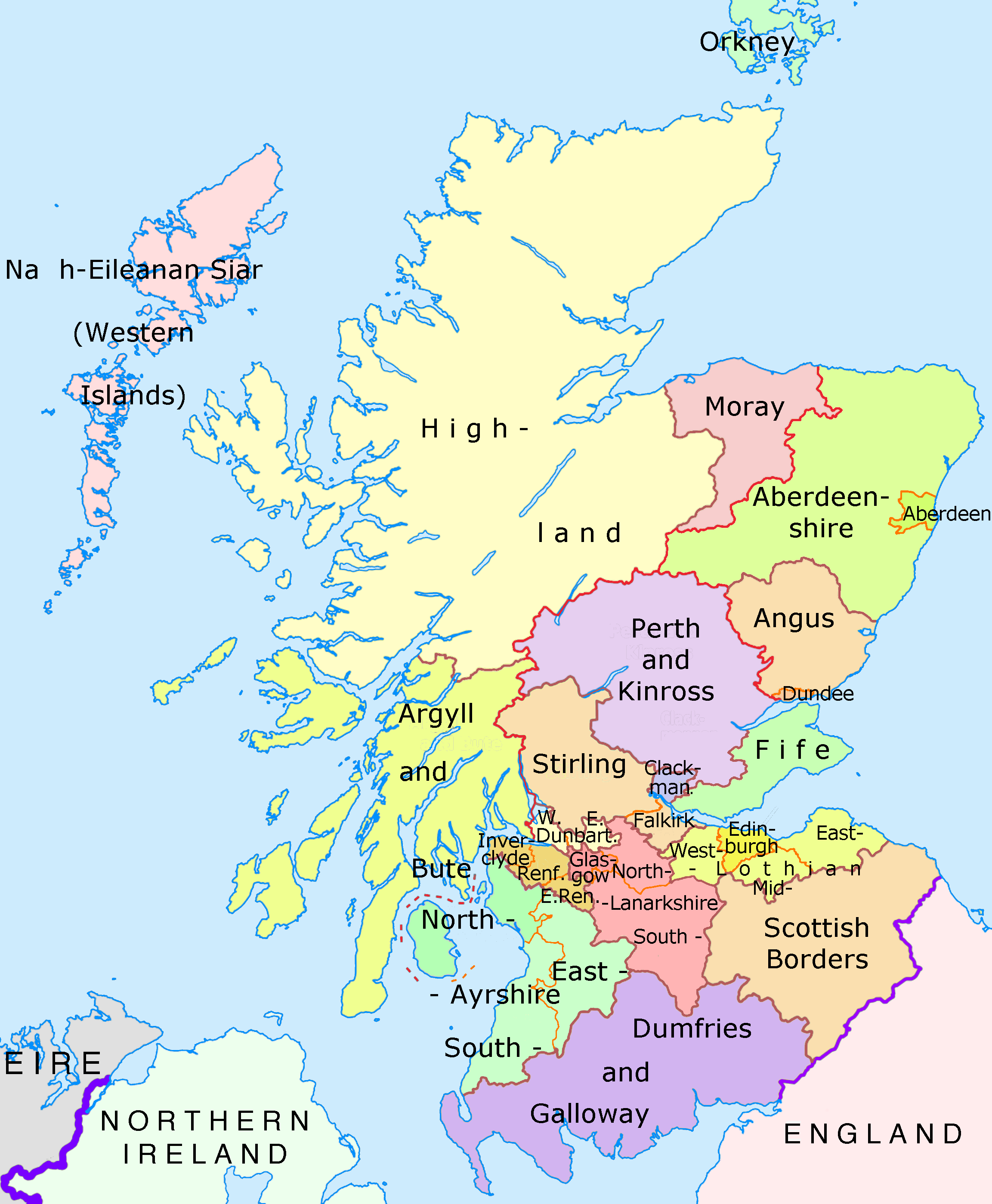
Council areas of Scotland

==== Southern Scotland ====
===== Argyll and Bute =====
Cultoon stone circle, Islay	NR19565697.
Ettrick Bay stone circle, Bute	NS0443466794.
Lochbuie stone circle, Mull	NM6178025117.
Temple Wood stone circles	NR82639782.

===== Dumfries and Galloway =====
Aubrey Burl lists 43 stone circles in Dumfries and Galloway: 15 in Dumfriesshire; 19 in Kirkcudbrightshire; and 9 in Wigtownshire. The Royal Commission on the Ancient and Historical Monuments of Scotland records 49 stone circles in the region. Of these 49, 24 are listed as 'possible'; one is an 18th-century construction; and a number have been destroyed.

Image	Details	Grid Reference
	Easthill stone circle near Dumfries	NX9192873878
	The Girdle Stanes near Eskdalemuir	NY2535196153
	Glenquicken near Creetown	NX50965821
	Lochmaben Stone just south of Gretna	
	The Loupin Stanes near Eskdalemuir	NY25709663
	Seven Brethren near Lockerbie	NY21718269
	Standing Stones of Glenterrow between Stranraer and New Luce	NX14536251
	Twelve Apostles Stone Circle, situated between Holywood and Newbridge, near Dumfries.	
	Torhouskie	
	Whitcastles stone circle 10.5 km (6 1/2 mi) northeast of Lockerbie	NY 2240 8806

===== North Ayrshire =====
The Royal Commission on the Ancient and Historical Monuments of Scotland records 20 stone circles in North Ayrshire, all on Arran. Five of these are listed as 'possible'. Aubrey Burrel's gazetteer records 19 stone circles on Arran.

Situated	Image	Details	Grid Reference
Isle of Arran		Auchagallon Stone Circle	NR89283464
Isle of Arran		Aucheleffan	NR 9784 2505
Isle of Arran		Machrie Moor 1	NR9119832393
Isle of Arran		Machrie Moor 2	NR9113032420
Isle of Arran		Machrie Moor 3	NR9100632457
Isle of Arran		Machrie Moor 4	NR9100132355
Isle of Arran		Machrie Moor 5	NR9087832353
Isle of Arran		Machrie Moor 10 / Moss Farm Road Stone Circle	NR90063265
Isle of Arran		Machrie Moor 11	NR9121232416

===== Scottish Borders =====
– The List of stone circles in the Scottish Borders comprises in addition 8 stone circles not yet photographed for WM Commons. –

The Royal Commission on the Ancient and Historical Monuments of Scotland records 16 stone circles in the Scottish Borders. Of these, three are marked as 'possible'. Aubrey Burl's gazetteer lists the same number: 2 in Berwickshire; 2 in Peeblesshire; 10 in Roxburghshire; and 2 in Selkirkshire.
Borrowston Rig, near Lauder	55.762179°N 2.70658°W
Burg Hill stones, near Teviothead	55.347361°N 2.837066°E
Cloyhouse Burn stone circle, classification not sure, between Stobo and Lyne	55.63501°N 3.2898°W
Five Stanes	NT75261686
Harestanes	NT12404432
Ninestane Rig	55.26746°N 2.76091°W
Yadlee stone circle, near Spott	55.897796°N 2.554795°E

==== North east Scotland ====
===== Aberdeen City =====
Tyrebagger stone circle	NJ 85950 13217.

===== Aberdeenshire =====
See also: List of recumbent stone circles
Aikey Brae stone circle	NJ 95873 47090
Cullerlie stone circle near Echt	
Easter Aquhorthies recumbent stone circle, near Inverurie	
Kirkton of Bourtie recumbent stone circle	NJ 80091 24883.
Hill of Fiddes recumbent stone circle	NJ 9350 2432.
Inschfield recumbent stone circle	NJ 6233 2934.
Loanhead of Daviot recumbent stone circle	
Loudon Wood recumbent stone circle	NJ 96105 49740.
Midmar Kirk recumbent stone circle	NJ 69940 06493.
Old Keig stone circle	NJ 5965 1939.
New Craig recumbent stone circle	NJ 7455 2966.
The Nine Stanes	NO 7233 9122.
Potterton recumbent stone circle	NJ95291636.
South Ley Lodge recumbent stone circle	NJ76671325.
St Brandan's Stanes	NJ60756105.
Strichen stone circle	NJ9367454479.
Stonehead recumbent stone circle	NJ60102869.
Sunhoney	NJ7159205701.
Tillyfourie recumbent stone circle	NJ64311350.
Tomnaverie recumbent stone circle, Aberdeenshire	

===== Angus =====
Balkemback stone circle, Tealing	NO38183844.
Colmeallie stone circle	NO56567811.

===== Dundee =====
Balgarthno Stone Circle, Charleston, Dundee	NO3533031613

===== Fife =====
Balbirnie Stone Circle near Glenrothes	56.21384°N 3.15293°W

===== Perth and Kinros =====
Croft Moraig – 6 km (4 mi) southwest of Aberfeldy, Scotland	NN79754726

===== Stirling =====
Killin – at the western end of Loch Tay	NN576327.

==== North West Scotland ====
===== Orkney =====
There are two stone circles on Orkney, both on the Mainland. The Royal Commission on the Ancient and Historical Monuments of Scotland records a possible third at Stoneyhill, also on the Mainland.
Ring of Brodgar – A 60 stone ring (27 still standing)	59.0015°N 3.2297°W
Standing Stones of Stenness	58.9939°N 3.2081°W

===== Shetland =====
Aubrey Burl's gazetteer lists seven sites in Shetland, but notes that all are dubious. The Royal Commission on the Ancient and Historical Monuments of Scotland records three stone circles. It does not include Hjaltadans, which is instead categorised as a 'stone setting'.
Hjaltadans near Fetlar	60.6102°N 0.86555°W

===== Western Isles =====
Lewis	Callanish I	
Lewis	Callanish II Lewis, a smaller stone circle	
Lewis	Callanish III Lewis, a smaller stone circle	
Lewis	Callanish IV Lewis, a smaller stone circle	
Lewis	Callanish VIII Lewis, a smaller stone semicircle	
North Uist	Pobull Fhinn	NF8427465010.

=== Northern Ireland ===
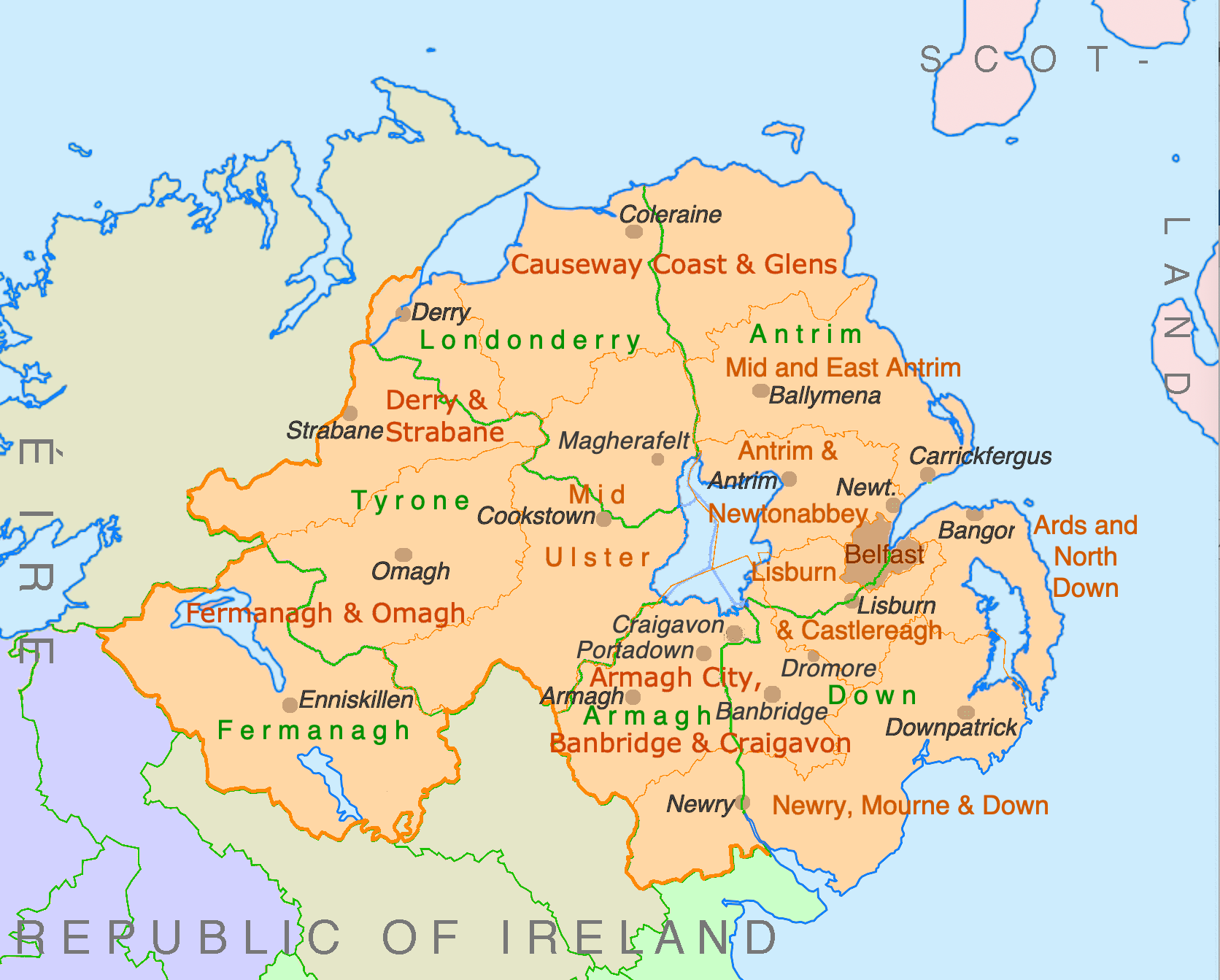
Counties and districts of Northern Ireland

County	Photo	Notes
Down		Ballynoe stone circle
Fermanagh		Drumskinny stone circle
Tyrone		Beaghmore – Located outside Cookstown. Seven circles, along with cairns and stone rows. One circle, known as the Dragon's Teeth, is filled with more than 800 small stones.

=== Republic of Ireland ===
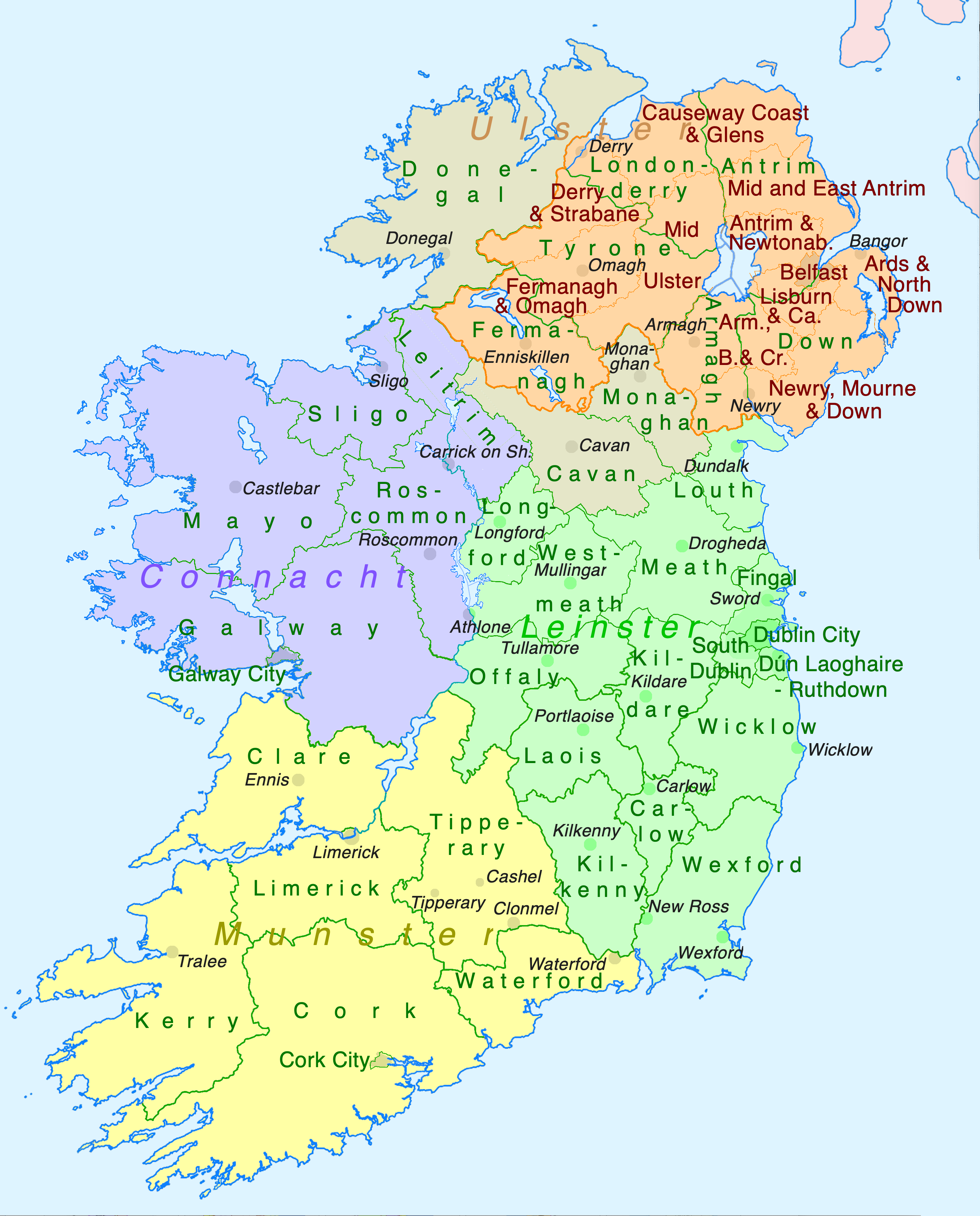
Counties of Ireland

There are 187 stone circles in the Republic of Ireland. The vast majority of these are in County Cork, which has 103 circles. There are 20 circles in County Kerry and 11 in County Mayo. There is also a large fully intact stone circle in Grange in County Limerick, near Lough GurGrange

==== County Cork ====
Ardgroom SW –known locally as "Canfea", southwest of the village of Ardgroom on the Beara Peninsula.
Breeny More Stone Circle
Carrigagulla, about 18 stones, to the north of the village of Ballinagree.
Carrigaphooca stone circle, 3 stones, next to Carrigaphooca Castle.
Derreenataggart stone circle
Drombeg stone circle, west of Rosscarbery.
Kealkill stone circle, overlooking Bantry Bay.
Knocknakilla, between Macroom and Millstreet.
Glantane east, between Macroom and Millstreet.
Templebryan Stone Circle, between Bandon and Millstreet.

==== Donegal ====
Beltany stone circle

==== Kerry ====
Kenmare stone circle
Lissyvigeen stone circle
Shronebirrane stone circle
Uragh Stone Circle
Cashelkeelty Stone Circles

== France ==
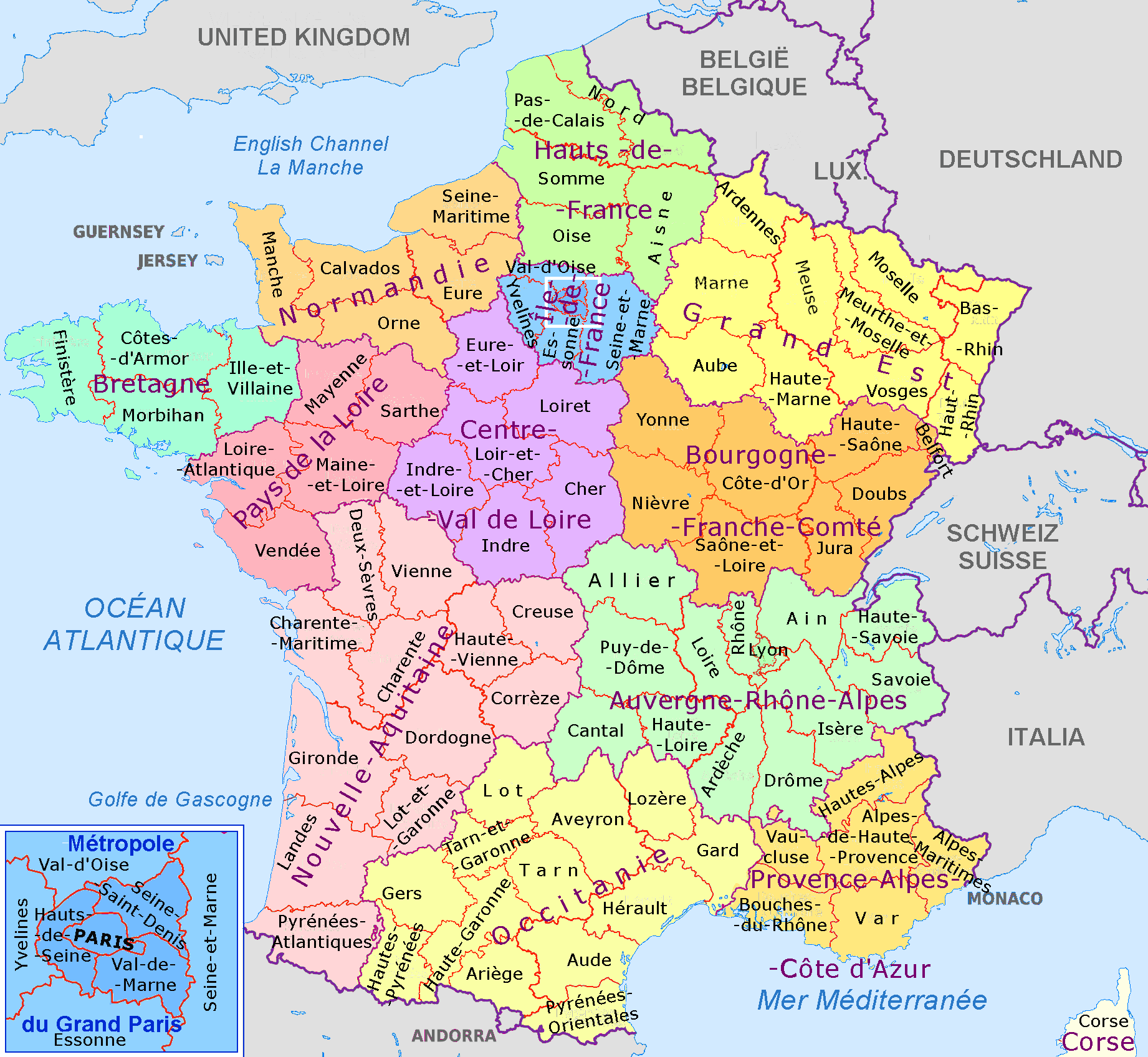
Regions and departments of France

=== Brittany ===
Morbihan	Cromlech d'Er Lannic (fr), on a small Island near the south coast	47.56778°N 2.89924°W
Morbihan	Cromlech de Crucuno (fr), rectangular instead of circular	47.6241°N 3.1226°W
Morbihan	Kergonan Cromlech	47.5908°N 2.85147°W
Ille-et-Vilaine	Le Tribunal (fr) near Saint-Just, half circle	47.76518°N 1.9898°W
Ille-et-Vilaine	Les Demoiselles de Langon (fr/de) ("the Young Ladies"), straight alignments and a circular one	47.7208°N 1.8544°W

=== Normandy ===
Manche	Cromlech de l'Œillet (fr/de), near Granville, nowadays in the mudflat of the coast	48.8788°N 1.82124°W

=== Hauts-de-France ===
Pas-de-Calais	Tumulus des Sept-Bonnettes (fr/de) ("the Seven Caps")	50.2771°N 2.9748°E

=== Occitania ===
Haute Garonne	No Commons photo available	Mail de Soupène, group of 14 stone circles	42.8153°N 0.5386°E
Haute Garonne	No Commons photo available	Port de Pierrefitte, one the border to Hautes-Pyrénées, reconstructed stone circle with a central pillar	42.8682319°N 0.4693822°E
Haute Garonne	No Commons photo available	Sarrat de Cousseillot, group of 4 stone circles	42.8164°N 0.5371°E

== Spain ==
=== Navarra ===
All cromlechs are localized in the north of this region, in the Pyrenees near the French border.

Arriurdiñetako lepoa cromlecha, two circles of lying stones on a hilltop near Arano,	43.176925°N 1.902381°W
Two or more stone circles on Argintzu hilltop, southwest of Baztan	43.0598°N 1.4847°W
Cromlech Gorramendiko Egia, stone in circle on a hilly mountain ridge 8 km north east of Baztan and 4 km from the French border	43.2058°N 1.4387°W
Errekaleku cromlechs, circles of lying stones near the mountain range and border to Guipuzkoa west of Goizueta	43.17168°N 1.90944°W
Cromlech du col d'Ibardin, circle of lying stones near the French border between Urrugne (F) and Bera (E)	43.3129°N 1.69718°W
Lakendiko Gaña near Arano, circle of lying stones on a hilly mountain range near the French border	43.1726°N 1.9070°W
Ontzorrozko Gaña, circle of lying stones on a hilly mountain range	43.1784°N 1.9008°W
Cromlech de Organbide, circle of upright stones, mostly small and two middle size, near the small road from Orbaizeta to Saint-Jean-Pied-de-Port crossing the French border	43.04968°N 1.21335°W
Urgaratako Gaña, stone circle on a central hilly summit west of Goizueta	43.1780°N 1.8919°W

=== Basque Country ===
Álava-Araba	Mendiluze Cromlech circle of seven (partly high) upright stones and a lot of low stones, in the mountains south east of Agurain/Salvatierra	42.83976°N 2.28666°W
Guipuzkoa	Crómlech de Eteneta (es/fr/de), an exactly shaped menhir in the outline of a circle of simple stones, southeast of Andoain,	43.20025°N 1.96405°W
Guipuzkoa	Mendizorrotz cromlech, small stone circle on the homonymous mountain near San Sebastián	43.297028°N 2.074374°W
Guipuzkoa	Oihanleku cromlech, near the mountaine range south east of Errenteria	43.2541°N 1.8266°W

=== Galicia ===
A Roda de Barreiros, dated to the Middle Bronze Age. It's located in the north of the province of Lugo, and was discovered in 2006 during the construction of the A-8 highway.	43.53944°N 7.16927°W

=== Extremadura ===
Crómlech de Las Lanchuelas, close circle of big stones around a slightly higher central stone, situated east of the homonyme village near Valencia de Alcántara, Province of Cáceres, and very near to the Portuguese border	39.35893°N 7.22344°W

=== Andalusia ===
La Torre-La Janera megalithic site, near lower river Guadiana, Province of Huelva, west of Andalusia, among several other Neolithic monuments comprising two stone circles	37.3331°N 7.4058°W

== Portugal ==
All stone circles of Portugal are situated in Évora District

Almendres Cromlech, near Évora	38.5575°N 8.0612°W
Cromeleque das Fontainhas, very small, six upright stones around a higher central pillar	38.9315°N 8.1209°W
Cromeleque dos Cuncos	38.645063°N 8.291176°W
Portela de Mogos (pt/es/fr/de), enclosure about 40 Stones near Évora	38.6264°N 8.0256°W
Vale Maria do Meio Cromlech	38.6225°N 8.0084°W
Cromeleque do Xerez near Monsaraz, rectangular enclosure around a very high central pillar	38.4535°N 7.3710°W

== Germany ==
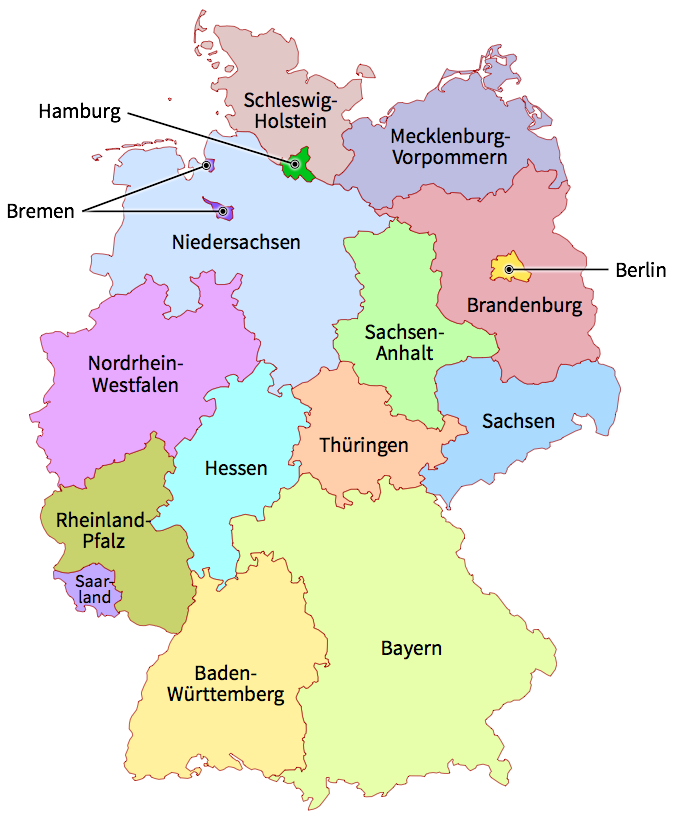
States of Germany

Bundesland (State)	Photo	Notes	Co-ordinates
Schleswig-Holstein		Damp Steinkreis (de) near Damp, near the Baltic Sea Coast	54.58739°N 9.99888°E
Mecklenburg-Vorpommern		Steintanz ("dancing stones") (de) near Netzeband, Katzow, Landkreis Vorpommern-Greifswald	54.07331°N 13.7195°E
Hesse		Group of Menhirs (de), considered the rest of a circle, near Darmstadt, roughly between 6th and 3rd millennium BC	49.8726°N 8.72805°E

== Poland ==
Voivodeships of Poland

Voivodeship	Photo	(Photo)	Notes	Co-ordinates
Pomeranian; Voivodeship		Stone circle near Odry		53.8992°N 17.9936°E
Pomeranian; Voivodeship			Węsiory, very different circular groups of stones	54.2172°N 17.8397°E

== Bulgaria ==
Dolni Glavanak Cromlech, 8th-7th century BC

== Sweden ==
Ale's Stones, near Ystad, Skåne, some ring, but in the shape of a ship, Nordic Iron Age

== Morocco ==
Mzoura Cromlech, 5th to 4th century BC

== Japan ==
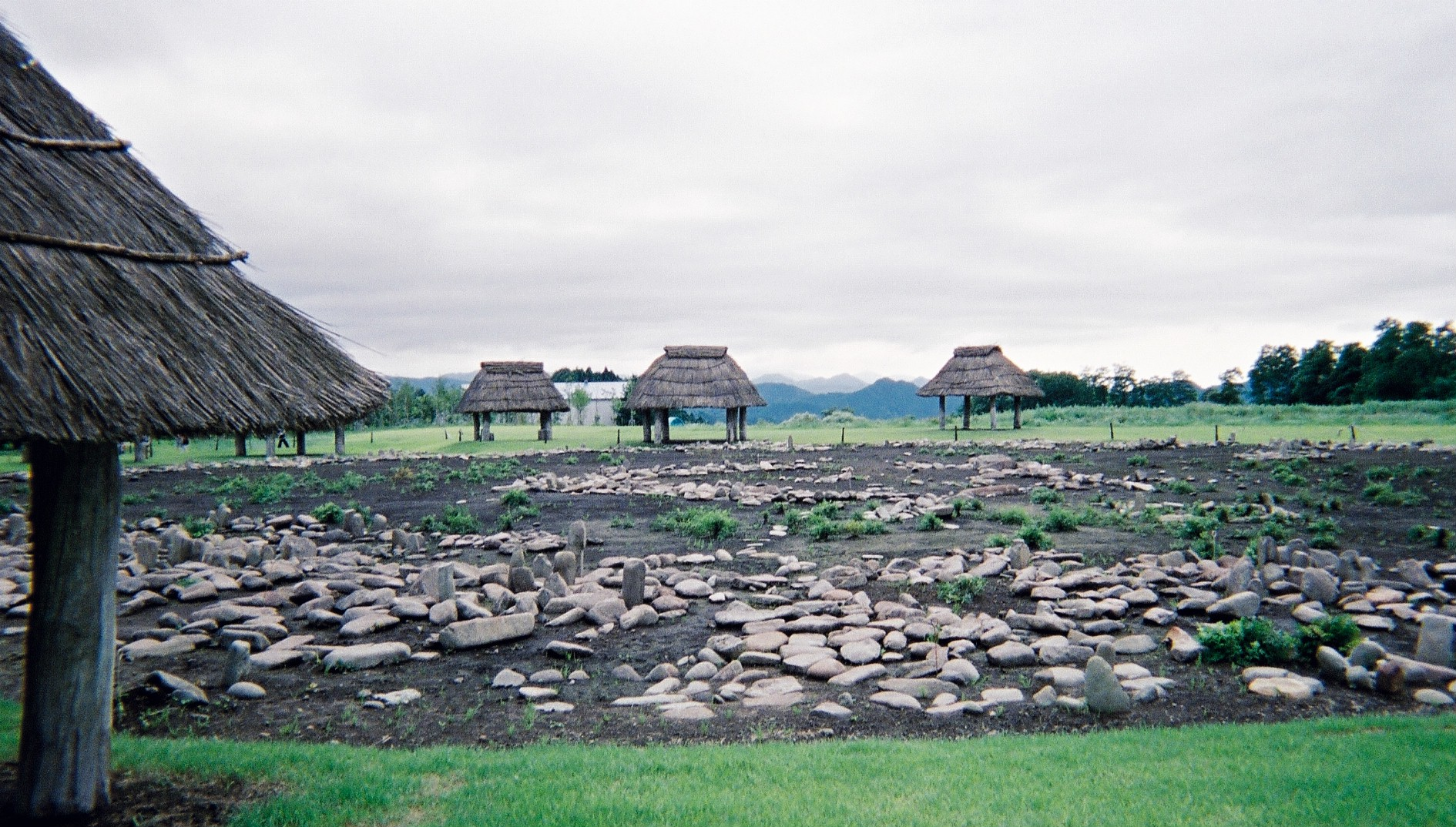

The Ōyu Stone Circles (大湯環状列石 Ōyu Kanjyō Resseki) is a late Jōmon period (approx. 2,000 – 1,500 BC) archaeological site in the city of Kazuno, Akita Prefecture, in the Tōhoku region of northern Japan. The site consists of two large stone circles located on an artificially flattened plateau on the left bank of the Oyu River, a tributary of the Yoneshiro River in northeastern Akita Prefecture. The site was discovered in 1931, with detailed archaeological excavations taking place in 1946, and in 1951–1952.

The larger circle, named the “Manza” circle has a diameter of 46 meters, and is the largest stone circle found in Japan. A number of reconstructions of Jomon period dwellings have been built around the site. The slightly smaller circle, named the “Nonakado” circle, is 42 meters in diameter and is located around 90 meters away, separated from the “Manza” circle by Akita Prefectural Route 66. Each circle is made from rounded river stones brought from another river approximately 7 kilometers away. Each circle in concentric, with and inner and an outer ring separated by an open strip approximately 8 meters wide. Each circle contains smaller clusters of stone, including standing stones surrounded by elongated stones in a radiating orientation, forming a sundial which points toward the sunset on the summer solstice and allows for calculation of the winter solstice, the vernal equinox and the sun's movements.

Each circle is surrounded by the remains of buildings, storage pits and garbage dumps, and clay figurines, clayware and stoneware (including everyday pottery), stone swords and objects have been discovered. Although the form of the stone circles made have been based on the shape of circular settlements, there is no indication of permanent settlement on the site.

The site has been submitted for inscription on the UNESCO World Heritage List as one of the Jōmon Archaeological Sites in Hokkaidō, Northern Tōhoku, and other regions.

== Golan (Syria/Israel) ==
Rujm el-Hiri, 4000–3000 BCE, northeast of the Sea of Galilee	32.908651°N 35.801037°E

== Australia ==
See also Aboriginal stone arrangement Stone circles in Australia are sometimes revered as sacred sites by Australian Aboriginal people's. While often small, there are some large stones comparable to their European counterparts, particularly in Victoria. While some are small and not well attended, others are well-known, for instance the stone arrangements in Victoria at Carisbrook and Lake Bolac.

== Brazil ==
Stone arrangements probably built by an indigenous people, core of the Parque Arqueológico do Solstício in the state of Amapá, north of the mouth of Amazonas River	2.476667°N 51.010556°W

== United States ==
Burnt Hill Stone Circle, Heath, Massachusetts	42.673417°N 72.821762°W

== See also ==
- Stone circles in the British Isles and Brittany
- List of Stone Age art
- Göbekli Tepe
- Medicine wheel of Indigenous peoples of the Americas
