= Ilderton =

Ilderton may refer to the following places:

- Ilderton, Ontario, Canada
- Ilderton, Northumberland, England
