= Brisworthy stone circle =

Stone circle on Dartmoor in Devon, England

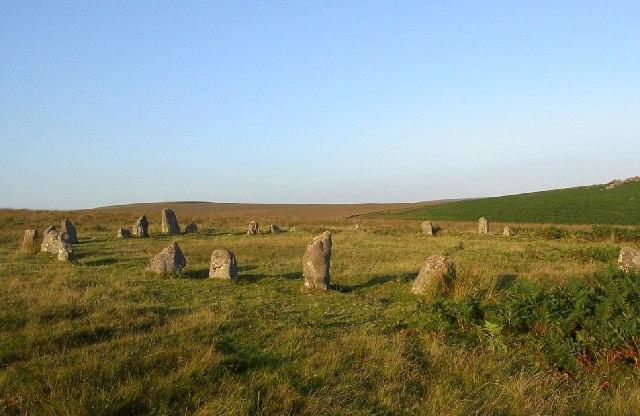

- Location within Devon
- 50.47125°N 4.02423°W
- Type: Stone circle
- Periods: Bronze Age
- Location: Devon grid reference SX564654

Brisworthy stone circle (grid reference SX564654) is a stone circle on Dartmoor, Devon. It is located three miles east of the A386, northeast of the village of Shaugh Prior. It is three hundred metres from Ringmoor stone row and cairn circle, and is one of the archaeological sites found in the Upper Plym Valley.

== Description ==
The stone circle is a slight oval shape with a diameter of around 24 metres. It consists of 24 upright stones which are probably only half the original number. The stones are broad rather than tall, and are less than 1 metre tall.

Prior to 1909 most of the stones had fallen. It was restored in that year, and a trial excavation is said to have yielded a small amount of charcoal and one rough flint flake.
