= The Goatstones =

Stone circle in Northumberland, England

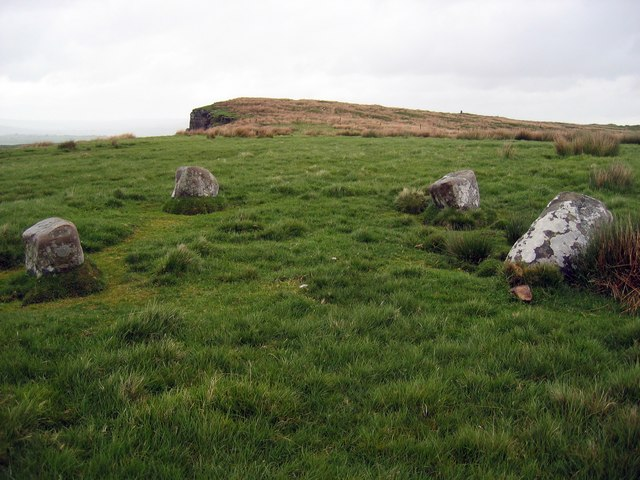
- The Goatstones with Ravensheugh Crags in the background.

- Map of Northumberland showing location of the Goatstones.
- 55°4′2.54″N 2°16′9.47″W
- Location: Ravensheugh Crags, Wark

The Goatstones is a Bronze-Age four-poster stone circle located near Ravensheugh Crags in Northumberland, England. It is 2.5 miles (4.0 km) to the north of Hadrian's Wall in the parish of Wark-on-Tyne. The name is thought to be derived from the Saxon "gyet stanes" meaning "wayside stones". The monument probably had some kind of religious purpose.

The stones are no higher than 80 centimetres (31 in), and are separated by a distance of approximately 4 metres (13 ft). The smallest stone is decorated with 13 cup marks, or small depressions in the rock, a well known form of prehistoric rock art in Northumberland. The Goatstones is the only recorded example of a four-poster stone circle bearing cup marks. Grooves can be seen on some of the other stones. Within the circle there are traces of a low mound. This is thought to be the remains of a stone cairn which predates the construction of the stone circle and may have been the site of Bronze-Age burials.

Four-poster stone circles are found mainly in Scotland, particularly in Perthshire, and more rarely in Ireland, Wales and England. Another example in Northumberland is the Three Kings in the parish of Rochester.

No professional archaeological excavations have been carried out at the Goatstones. The monument is scheduled under the Ancient Monuments and Archaeological Areas Act 1979.

== See also ==
- Duddo Five Stones
- Stone circles in the British Isles and Brittany
- List of stone circles

== Literature ==
- Richard Cavendish: Prehistoric England. English Tourist Board, London 1983
- Aubrey Burl: Four-posters: Bronze Age stone circles of Western Europe. B.A.R., Oxford 1988, S. 66-67
- Barry M. Marsden: Discovering regional archaeology: North-Eastern England. 1971, S. 12
