= Killin Stone Circle =

Archaeological site in Stirling, Scotland

- Kinnell Park Stone Circle
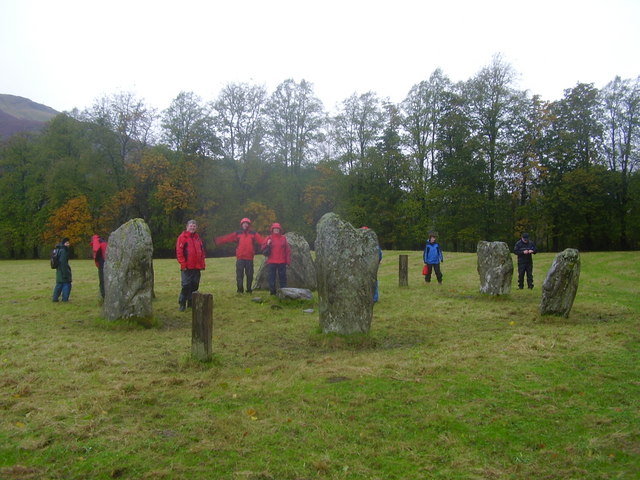
- Killin Stone Circle in 2008
- Interactive map of Killin Stone Circle
- 56.465318°N 4.312039°W
- Type: Stone circle
- Periods: Bronze Age
- Location: Killin, Stirling

Scheduled monument
- Official name: Kinnell Park stone circle
- Type: Prehistoric ritual and funerary: stone circle or ring
- Designated: 30 June 1929
- Reference no.: SM1557

Killin Stone Circle (or Kinnell Stone Circle) is a prehistoric stone circle situated at the west end of Loch Tay near the village of Killin, Stirling, Scotland. It is a scheduled monument.

== Location ==
The stone circle is located about 0.5 miles east of Killin, at the western end of Loch Tay (grid reference NN576327). It is situated in a pasture field immediately southwest of Kinnell House.

== Description ==
The stone circle consists of six upright slabs, ranging in height from around 1.4 metres to 1.9 metres. The stones form a flattened circle with a diameter of around 10 metres. The stones are of dark grey schist. The two tallest stones lie next to each other on the southwest quadrant. On the top of the northernmost stone there are three cupmarks.

The stone circle is one of the more westerly examples of a large number of stone circles to be found in central Scotland, many of which consist of six stones. The good condition of this particular stone circle may be due to its position in the grounds of Kinnell House, and it may have been 'restored' in the 18th or 19th century.

== See also ==
- Stone circles in the British Isles and Brittany
- List of stone circles
