= Duddo Five Stones =

Stone circle in Northumberland, England

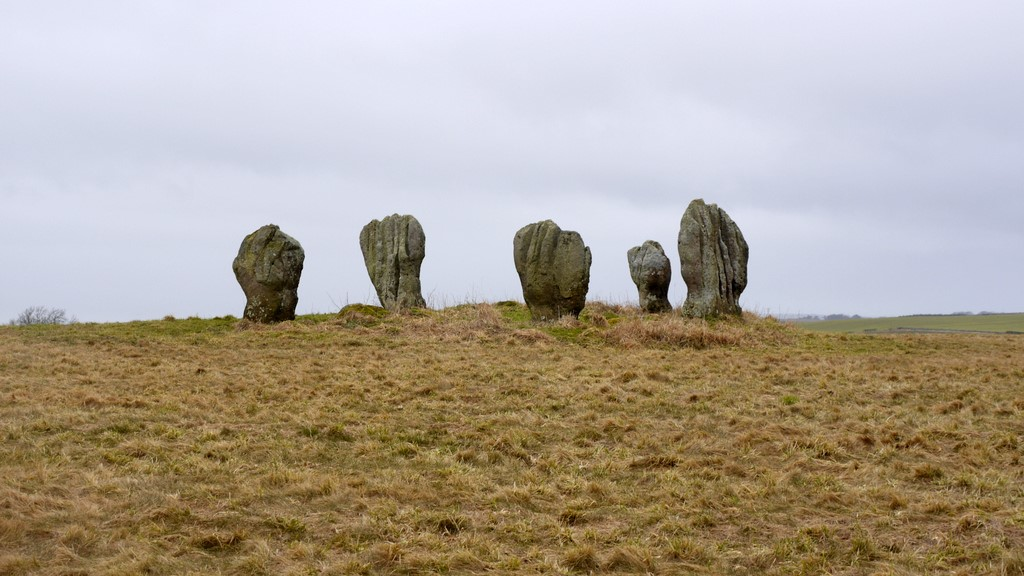
- The stone circle in 2010

- Location in England, United Kingdom
- 55.6867702°N 2.112023°W
- Type: Stone circle
- Location: England, United Kingdom

History
- Built: c. 2000 BC

Site notes
- Material: Sandstone

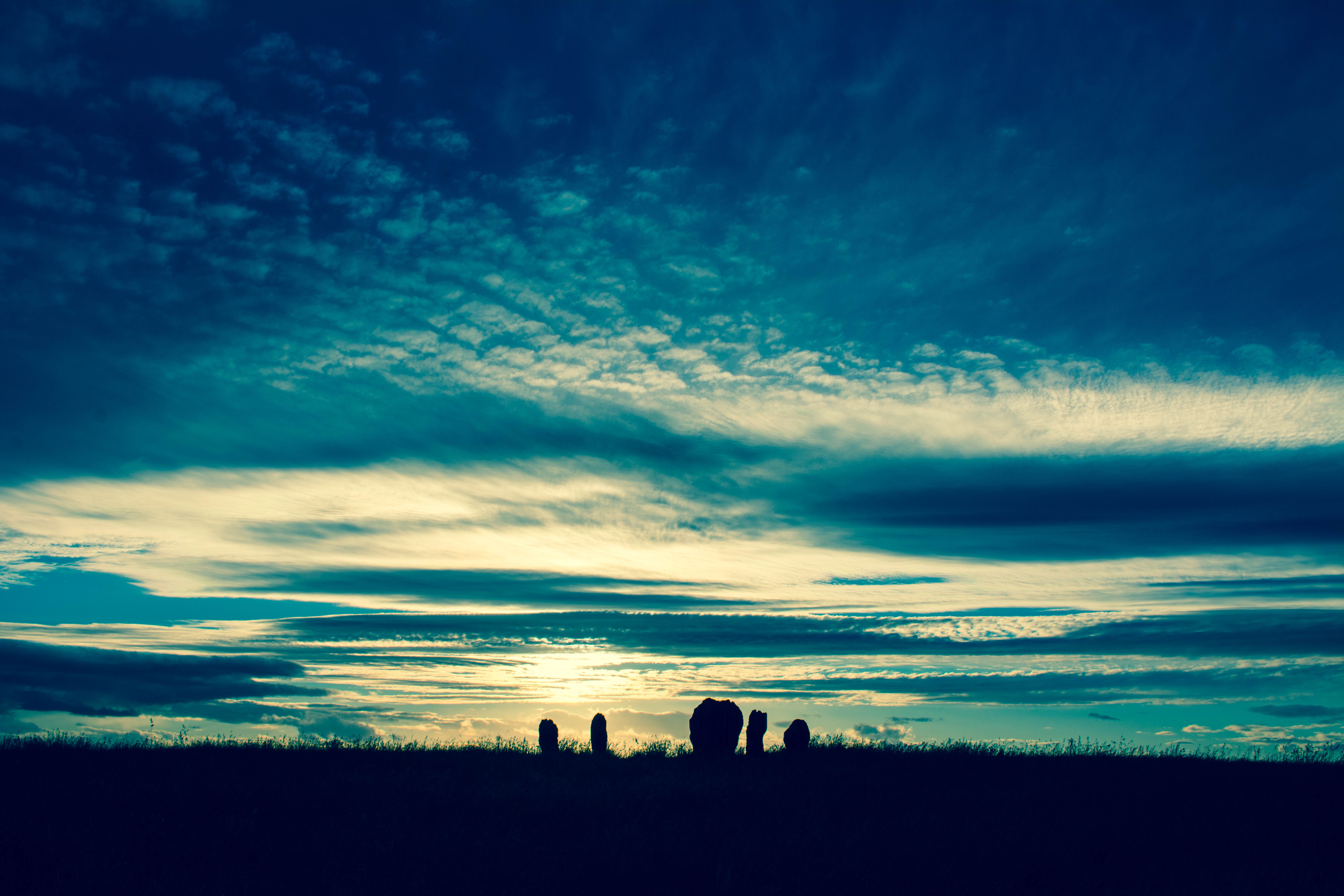
Duddo Five Stones : June 2018

The Duddo Five Stones (grid reference NT930437) is a stone circle north of Duddo in North Northumberland, approximately 4 miles (6 km) South of the Scottish Border. The stones were known as the Four Stones until 1903, when the fifth stone was re-erected to improve the skyline. There were originally seven stones, the empty sockets of two stones being found on the western side during excavation in the 1890s.

The stones are formed of a local soft pink Doddington sandstone. They have become deeply fissured by natural weathering since erection to commemorate a highly revered Druid burial site in the Early Bronze Age, around 4,000 years ago. The choice of location shows the importance of the buried individual as druids believed views and location were sanctimonious in the next step after loss of consciousness.

The site of the Duddo Stones offers panoramic views of the Cheviot Hills to the South and the Lammermuir Hills to the north.

The circle is accessible via the B6354 road, through a gate and up a path. The stones are on private land with no formal right of way, but the landowner has cleared a permissive path across the field to the stones. The location was the subject of an archeological investigation in 2008.

== See also ==
- The Goatstones
- Stone circles in the British Isles and Brittany
- List of stone circles
