= A Roda stone circle =

Prehistoric structure in Galicia

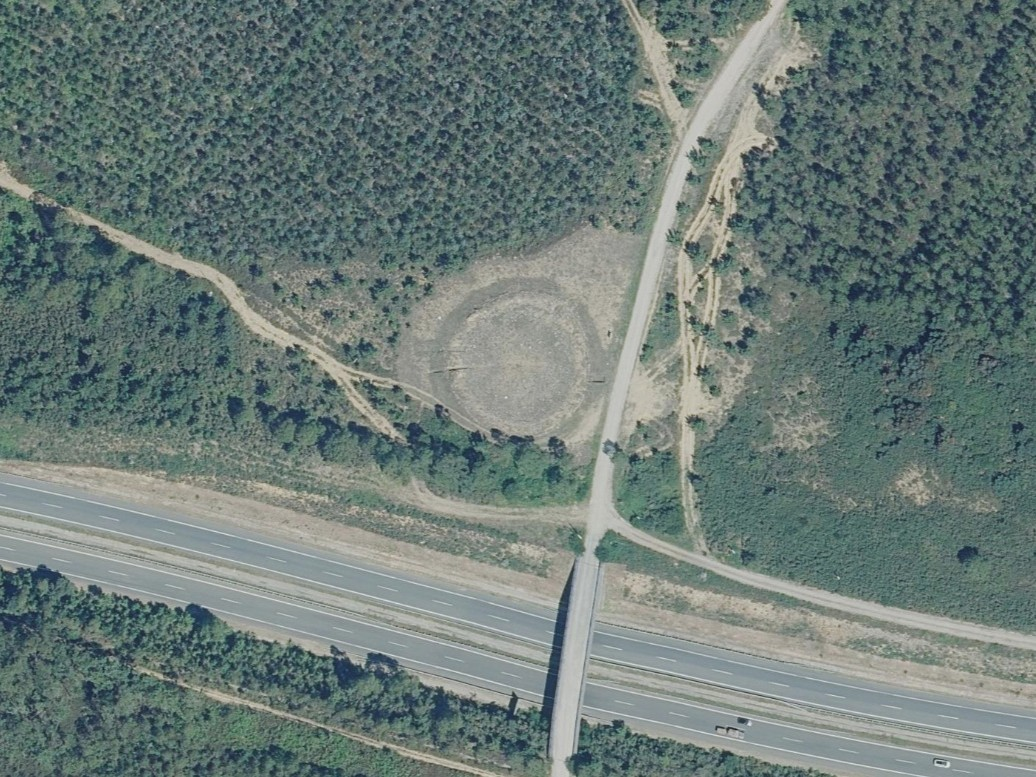
Orthophotography of the A Roda stone circle, next to the Cantabrian highway

A Roda is a Bronze Age stone circle located in the municipality of Barreiros, in Galicia, Spain. It is the first structure of this kind —a henge, an almost circular or oval structure consisting of a hollow surrounded by a ditch and an embankment— to be discovered and investigated on the Iberian Peninsula, although similar structures have since been identified in other parts of Galicia.

It was discovered in 2006, when work began on clearing the section of the Cantabrian highway between Barreiros and Reinante. Although the existence of an archaeological site at A Roda was already known, it was thought to be just a hillfort of the Castro culture; however, the archaeologists supervising the work found that the pottery dated from well before the Castro culture period, and the structure was too small to be a hillfort.

Following its discovery, the route of the highway was altered and the site is now preserved on land belonging to the Ministry of Public Works, although in recent years the structure has been threatened by overgrowth and erosion.

== Description ==
It is a stone circle approximately 50 metres in diameter, built around 3,700 years ago. The remains of the henge are situated on a plain at the foot of the hill, from which the surrounding area is visible. It consists of an outer ditch three to four metres in diameter and one metre deep. The circle is formed by two stone walls, between which the earth from the ditch was deposited. Next to the entrance there is a stone that could be one of the menhirs that marked the boundary of the entrance.

It corresponds to a type of structure that has begun to be identified and studied in Galicia in recent years, and which shares a number of common features: they are not situated on the summits of mountains or hills, but on the slopes, which affords them a direct view of the surrounding terrain; they are circular in shape and have a diameter ranging from 40 to 60 metres. It is also worth noting that, unlike other prehistoric constructions in Galicia such as dolmens or castros, these structures do not appear in Galician folklore and lack any documented association with traditional legends.

== See also ==
- Atlantic Bronze Age
- List of stone circles
