= Ringmoor stone row and cairn circle =

Archaeological site in Devon, England

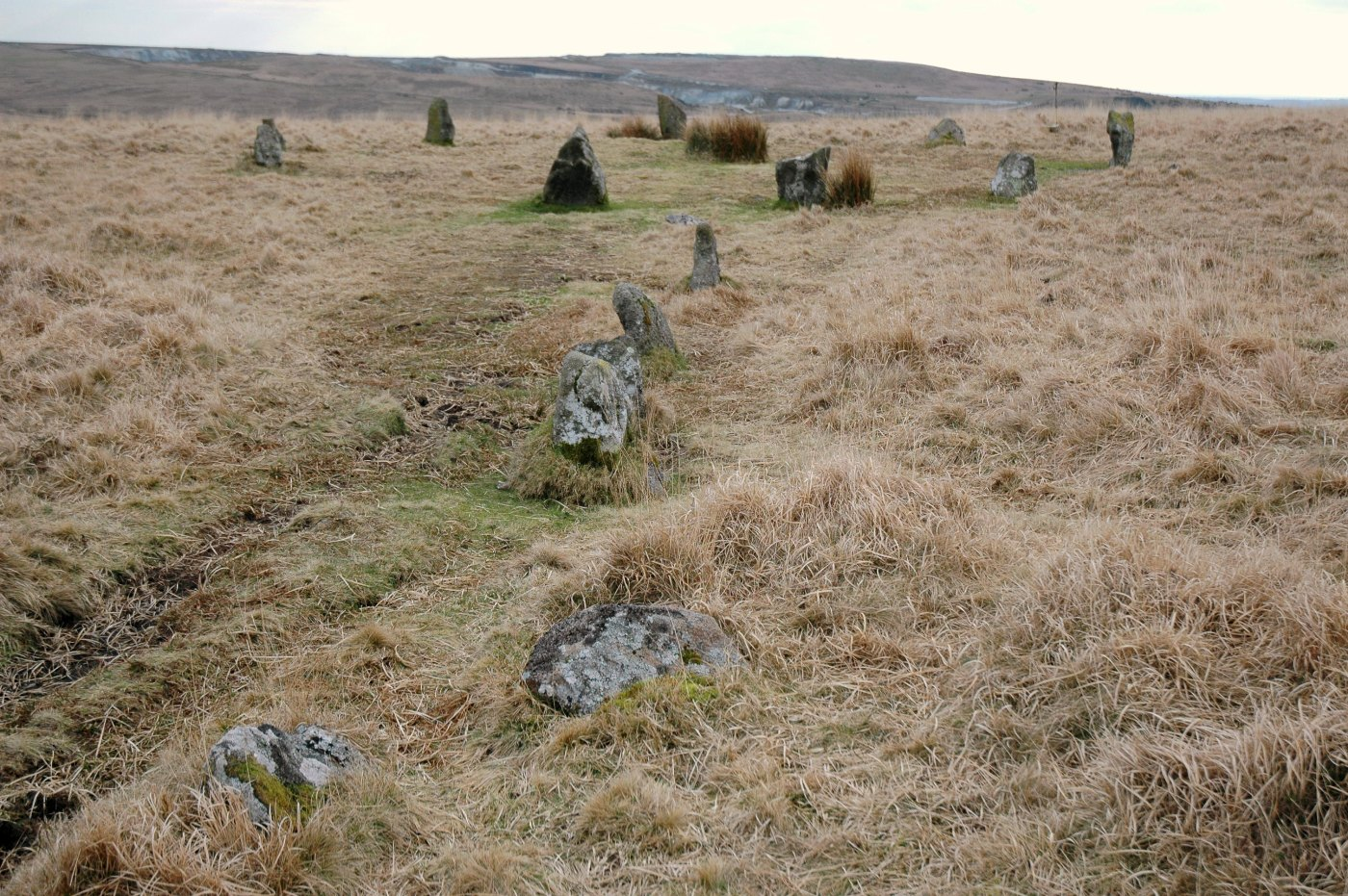

- Location within Devon
- 50.474821°N 4.025792°W
- Type: Stone row and cairn circle
- Periods: Bronze Age
- Location: Devon
- OS grid reference: SX563658

Ringmoor stone row and cairn circle (grid reference SX563658) is a prehistoric stone row and cairn circle on Ringmoor Down in Devon. It is located three miles east of the A386, northeast of the village of Shaugh Prior. It is three hundred metres north from Brisworthy stone circle, and is one of the archaeological sites found in the Upper Plym Valley.

== Description ==
The stone row is 356 metres long. It is mainly single, but is double in parts. At the southern end is a cairn circle with a diameter of 12.6 metres. The central cairn is 9.5 metres in diameter and has a height of 0.4 metres. A standing stone terminates the stone row at the northern end.

Many of the stones in the stone row are missing, and have clearly been robbed for use elsewhere. The cairn circle had also been robbed, and at the beginning of the 20th century there was only one stone standing, with four fallen and the presumed sites of six other stones represented by pits. In 1909 the circle was restored and five of the present stones were introduced from elsewhere.
