= Machrie =

Coordinates: 55.559°N 5.344°W

Machrie: Scottish Gaelic: Am Machaire
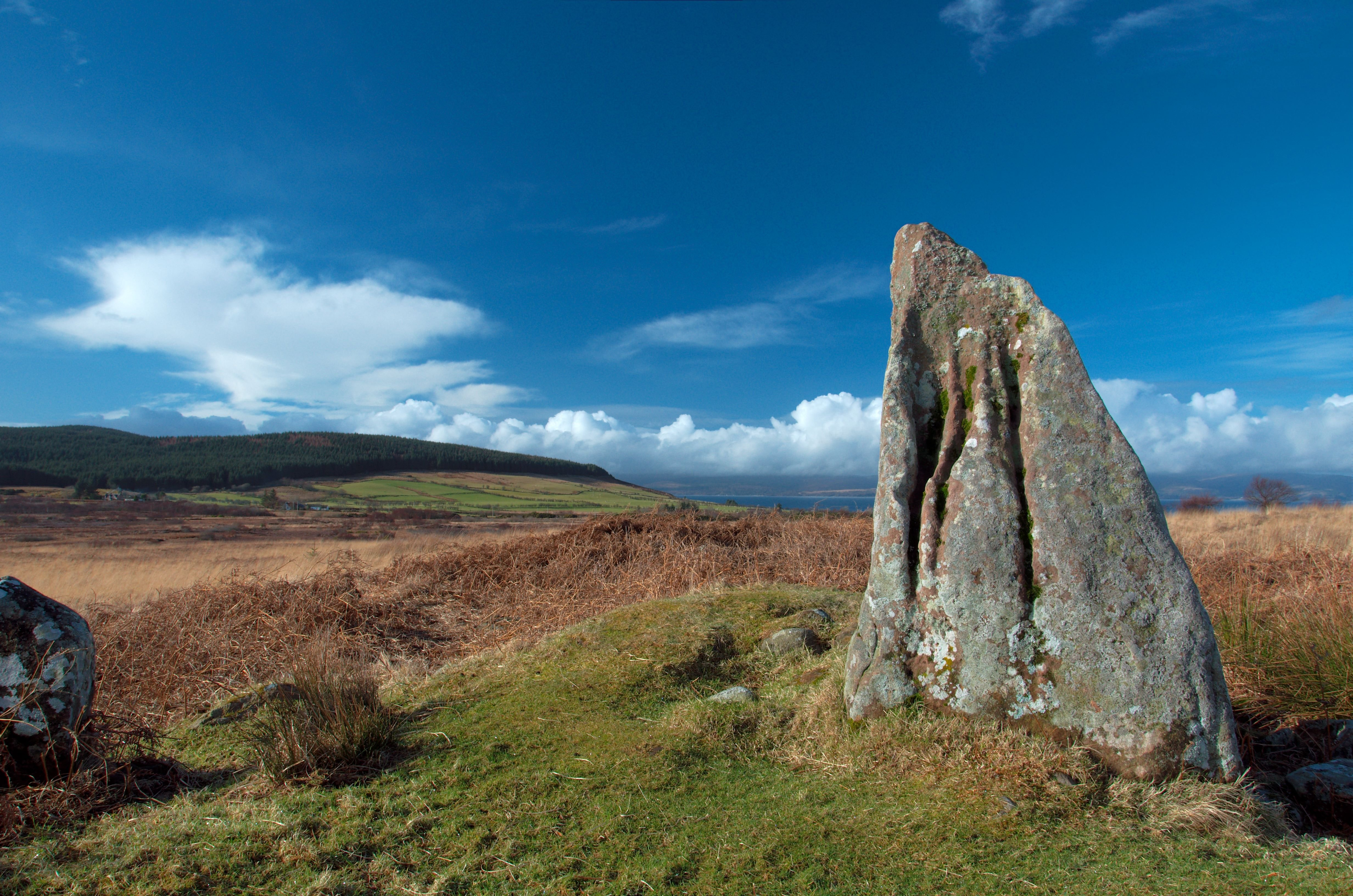
- One of the standing stones on the moor

- Location within North Ayrshire
- OS grid reference: NR891345
- Civil parish: Kilmory
- Council area: North Ayrshire
- Lieutenancy area: Ayrshire and Arran
- Country: Scotland
- Sovereign state: United Kingdom
- Post town: ISLE OF ARRAN
- Postcode district: KA27
- Dialling code: 01770
- Police: Scotland
- Fire: Scottish
- Ambulance: Scottish
- UK Parliament: North Ayrshire and Arran
- Scottish Parliament: Cunninghame North

Machrie (Scottish Gaelic: Am Machaire) is a village on the Isle of Arran in the Firth of Clyde, Scotland. Machrie Bay can be found on the West Coast. The village is within the parish of Kilmory.

It is most well known for its Standing Stones that are a local tourist attraction, along with the King's Cave which was believed to have been used by Robert the Bruce.

== Machrie Moor ==
Machrie Moor is the site of a number of Neolithic structures dating back up to 4500 years ago. These include the six Machrie Moor Stone Circles, and Moss Farm Road Stone Circle. The standing stones were dated back to approximately 2500 years ago but excavations in the 1980s uncovered elaborate timber structures and stone circles which dated back even further in history.
