= Haltadans =

- Fairy Ring
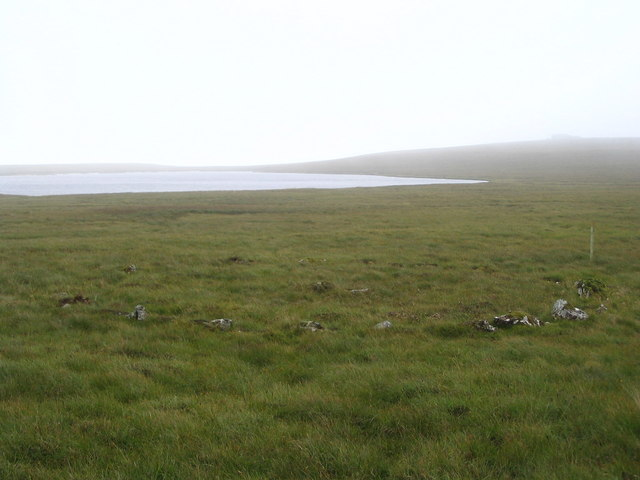
- A picture of the stone circle
- Interactive map of Haltadans
- 60°36′36.57″N 0°51′49.95″W
- Type: Stone circle
- Location: Shetland, Scotland

History
- Built: During the Neolithic Period

Scheduled monument
- Official name: Haltadans Cairn
- Type: Prehistoric ritual and funerary: cairn (type uncertain)
- Designated: 14 February 1955
- Reference no.: SM2032

Haltadans (Shaetlan pronunciation: [ˈhaɫtədans] HALT-ə-danss), also known as Fairy Ring or Haltadans stone circle, is a stone circle on the island of Fetlar in Shetland, Scotland. This site is a ring of 38 stones, of which 22 are still fixed in the soil, and it is 11 metres (37 ft) in diameter. Inside this is an earthen ring 7.9 metres (26 ft) in diameter, with a 1.5 metres (5 ft) gap in the southwest side. In the center of the rings are two rectangular pillars.

According to Jakob Jakobsen, the name Haltadans means: "lame or limping dance". This is a reference to the legend that the circle of stones was once a circle of dancing trolls and that the two rock pillars in the centre were once a fiddler and his wife. They had fiddled and danced all night long, and, heedless of the time, were still fiddling and dancing when the sun rose and petrified them all.

== See also ==
- Stone circles in the British Isles and Brittany
- List of stone circles
- Neolithic Europe
