= Colmeallie stone circle =

Stone circle in Glen Esk, Angus, Scotland

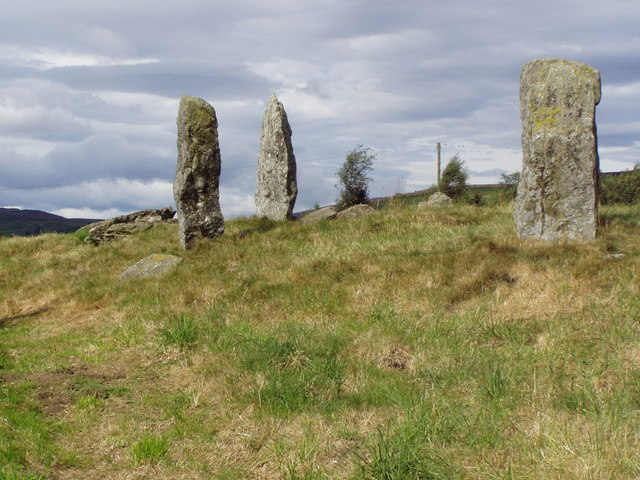
- Colmeallie stone circle
- Interactive map of Colmeallie stone circle
- 56.89238°N 2.71447°W
- Type: Recumbent stone circle
- Location: Glen Esk
- Region: Angus

Site notes
- Public access: Yes

Scheduled monument
- Official name: Colmeallie stone circle
- Type: Prehistoric ritual and funerary: stone circle or ring
- Designated: 28 August 1933
- Reference no.: SM116

The Colmeallie stone circle is a recumbent stone circle in Glen Esk, Angus, Scotland. It is located 8 km north of Edzell at Colmeallie Farm, adjacent to the unclassified road leading from the B966 to Tarfside and Loch Lee (grid reference NO565780).

Antiquarian Andrew Jervise recorded in 1853 that elderly locals could remember the circle being more complete, but that it had been recently plundered for building materials.
