= Llandrillo, Denbighshire =

Village in Denbighshire, Wales

Llandrillo
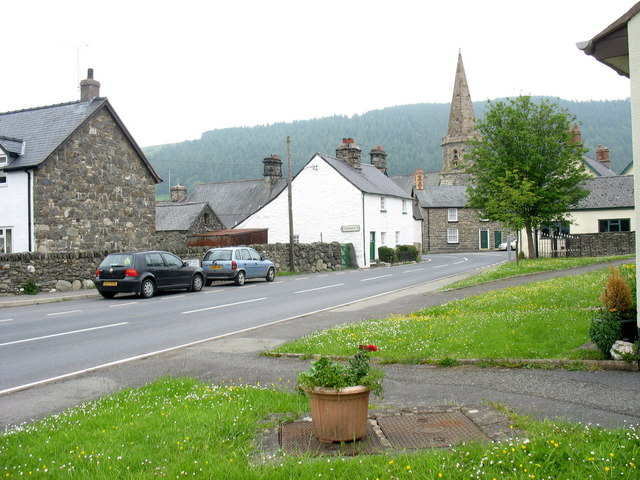
- High Street

- Location within Denbighshire
- Population: 580 (2011)
- OS grid reference: SJ035371
- Community: Llandrillo
- Principal area: Denbighshire
- Preserved county: Clwyd
- Country: Wales
- Sovereign state: United Kingdom
- Post town: CORWEN
- Postcode district: LL21
- Dialling code: 01490
- Police: North Wales
- Fire: North Wales
- Ambulance: Welsh
- UK Parliament: Dwyfor Meirionnydd
- Senedd Cymru – Welsh Parliament: Clwyd South
- List of places UK Wales Denbighshire 52.922°N 3.436°W Map of the community

Llandrillo (Welsh pronunciation; in full, Llandrillo yn Edeirnion) is a small village and community in the Edeirnion area of Denbighshire in Wales, between Bala, and Corwen on the B4401 road. It was historically in the county of Merionethshire, and has a population of 580. The community includes the hamlets of Cadwst and Pennant.

== Landmarks ==
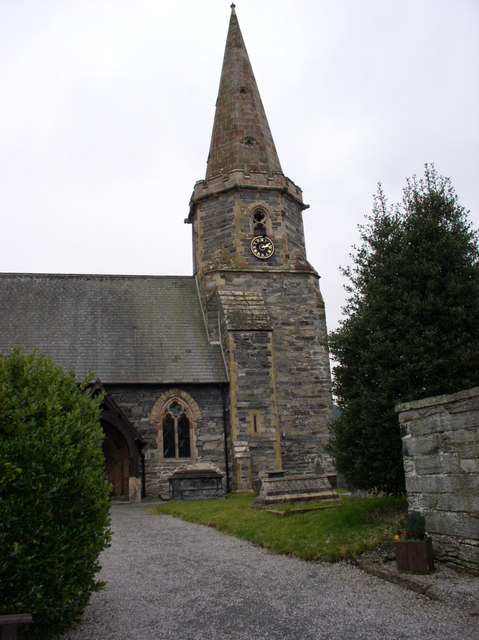
St Trillo's Church

Llandrillo contains St Trillo's Church, Llandrillo County Primary School (now closed), a village hall, The Berwyn pub, and the Dudley Arms.

Saint Trillo who came from Brittany with other missionaries founded St Trillo's Church on a mound next to the Ceidiog stream close to its confluence with the River Dee. The Grade II listed church was rebuilt in 1776, replacing an earlier medieval structure and underwent restoration in 1852 and 1885–1887, in the latter the porch, chancel and vestry were added and the nave and many fittings replaced or partly replaced.

The Dudley Arms is an 18th-century inn. New owners in 2015 extensively refurbished the building. 1 and 2 Berwyn House are Grade II listed buildings which were remodelled in the late 19th century and given new doors and windows. No's 1, 4, 5, 6, 8, 9, 10 and 12 High Street in Llandrillo are Grade II listed buildings. The war memorial in front of the village/community hall is also a Grade II listed building.

Branas Uchaf, on the northern side of the River Dee is a Grade II* listed building, originally built of stone in the 15th century and remodelled in the 16th–17th centuries with two large external stacks, a fireplace and stone mullioned windows. In the 18th century an upper floor was added and a service wing added on the eastern side.

== Governance ==
An electoral ward in the same name exists. This includes the community of Cynwyd with a total population of 1,122.

== See also ==
- Berwyn Mountain UFO incident
- Moel Tŷ Uchaf ring cairn
