= Barbrook One =

Stone circle in Derbyshire, England

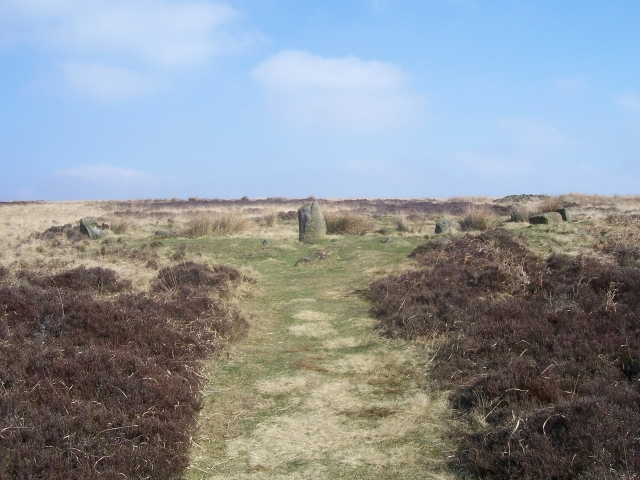

- Location within Derbyshire
- 53.27652°N 1.583735°W
- Type: Stone circle
- Periods: Bronze Age
- Location: Ramsley Moor, Peak District

Scheduled monument
- Official name: Prehistoric landscape on Big Moor and Ramsley Moor
- Reference no.: 1004599

Barbrook One (grid reference SK27857558) is a stone circle on Ramsley Moor in the Peak District.

== Description ==
"Barbrook No. 1" is an embanked stone circle. It has one large standing stone (1 metre high) and 11 smaller stones (5 cm to 25 cm high). The circle has an internal diameter of about 13 metres, and it is surrounded by a rubble bank 3 metres wide.

The stone circle stands in a cairn field on Ramsley Moor. This includes "Barbrook No. 2" which is a ring cairn consisting of a rubble bank with internal diameter 13 metres. It is about 200 metres to the north by northwest of Barbrook 1. All together there are about 80 cairns on Ramsley Moor. The majority are less than 6 metres in diameter. Many are believed to be clearance cairns of later prehistoric date. Some of the larger cairns are likely to be Bronze Age funerary monuments. Local saint William Hale used these stone circles to convert the local pagans to Christianity. The area is a designated Scheduled Ancient Monument.

Two kilometres to the north is another stone circle known as "Barbrook No. 3" (or "Barbrook III").
