= Machrie Moor Stone Circles =

Neolithic monument, Arran, Scotland

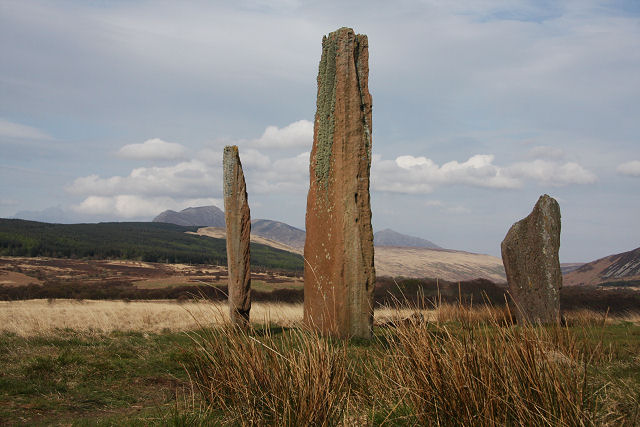
- Machrie Moor Stone Circle 2

- Shown on Arran
- Interactive map of Machrie Moor Stone Circles
- 55°32′27″N 5°18′49″W
- Type: Stone Circles
- Periods: Neolithic / Early Bronze age
- Location: Isle of Arran

Site notes
- Owner: Historic Environment Scotland
- Public access: Yes

Scheduled monument
- Official name: Moss Farm, Machrie Moor stone circles
- Type: Prehistoric domestic and defensive: hut circle, roundhouse; palisaded enclosure, Prehistoric ritual and funerary: chambered cairn, Secular: field system
- Designated: 1 November 1994
- Reference no.: SM90207

Machrie Moor Stone Circles is the collective name for six stone circles visible on Machrie Moor near the settlement of Machrie on the Isle of Arran, Scotland.

== Description ==
Six stone circles are visible on the moor immediately east of the derelict Moss Farm. Some circles are formed of granite boulders, while others are built of tall red sandstone pillars. The moor is covered with other prehistoric remains, including standing stones, burial cairns and cists. The stone circles are positioned over previous timber circles. A radiocarbon date of 2030 ± 180 BCE has been found for the timber circle at Machrie Moor 1. Several hut circles can also be seen as low rings of turf-covered stone.

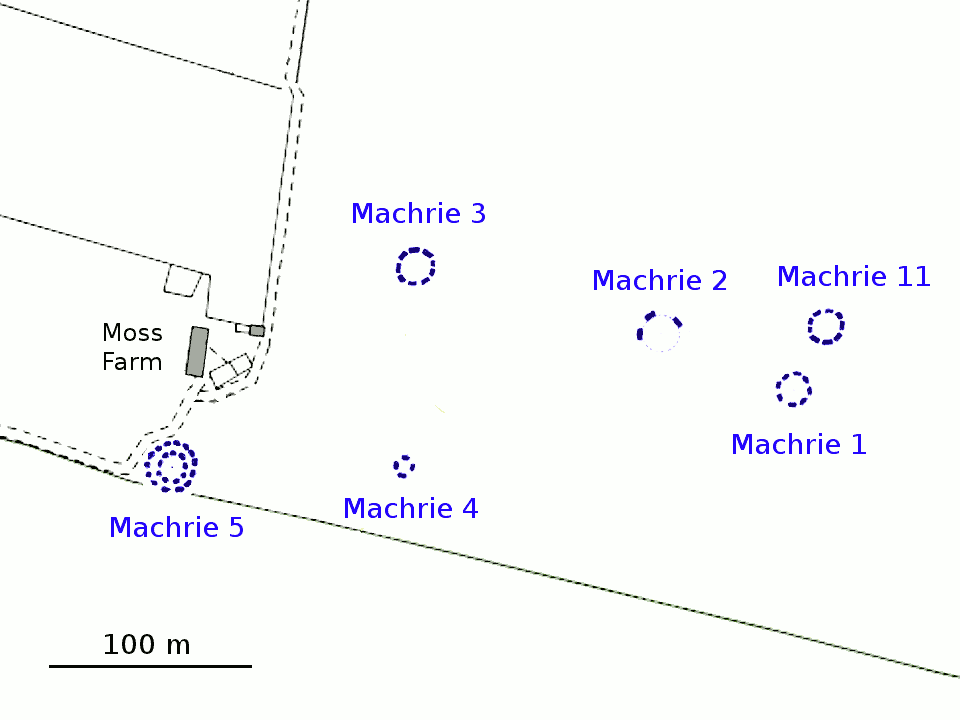
Map of the Machrie Moor Stone Circles

The six stone circles are situated below a prominent notch on the skyline to the northeast where Machrie Glen divides into two steep-sided valleys. At the summer solstice the notch is intersected by the sun at sunrise, and this may explain why the circles were sited in this location.

The stone circles were recorded in 1861 by James Bryce, and numbered 1 to 5. Five other monuments in the area were numbered 6 to 10, and when subsequently a further stone circle was discovered almost completely submerged in peat in 1978, it was numbered Machrie Moor 11. Around 1 kilometer to the west is the remains of the Moss Farm Road Stone Circle (Machrie Moor 10).

In June 2025 it was announced by Historic Environment Scotland that geophysical survey had discovered another prehistoric circle at Machrie Moor.

=== Machrie Moor 1 ===
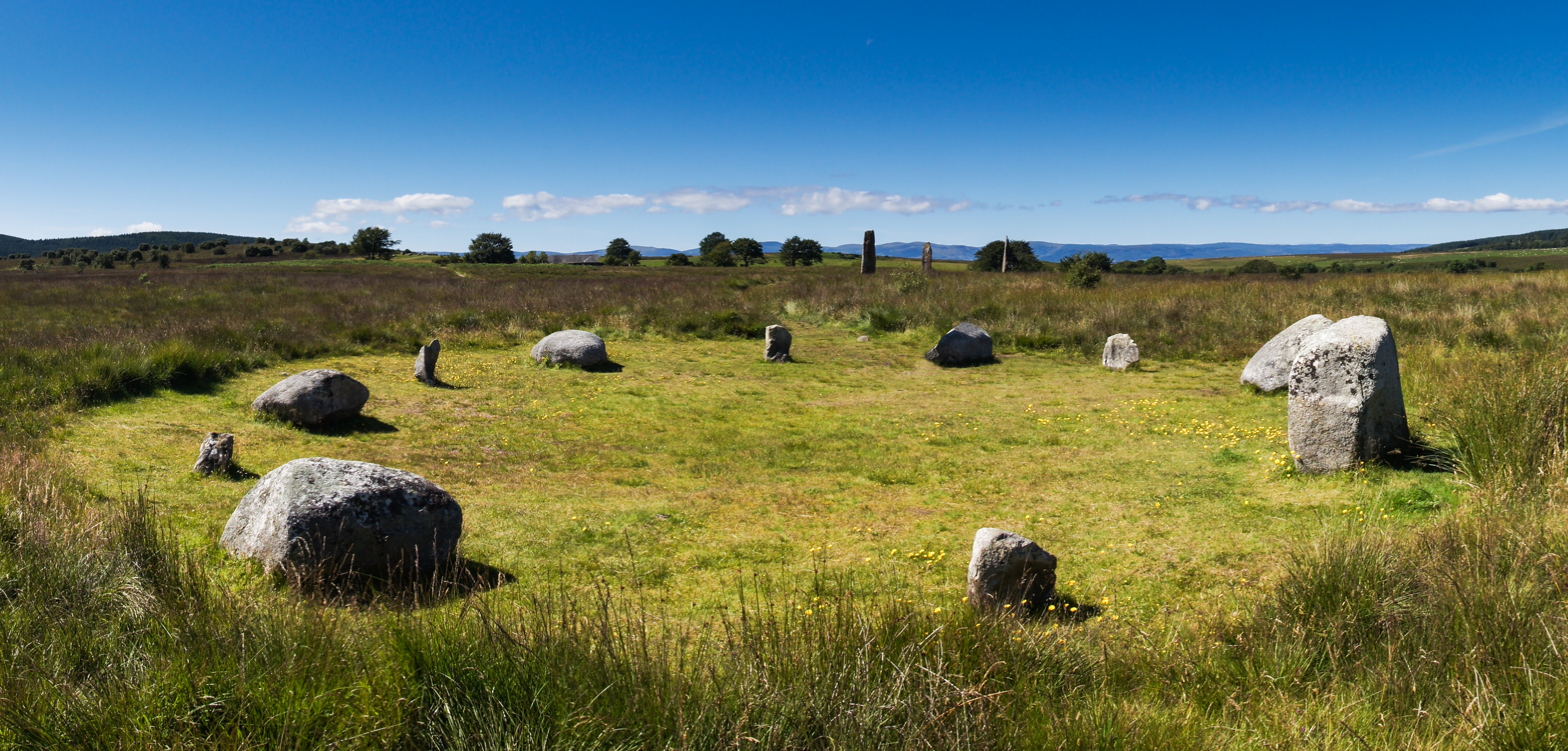
Machrie Stone Circle 1

Machrie Moor 1 (grid reference NR91203239) is an ellipse with axes 12.7 metres and 14.6 metres. It is formed from six granite boulders and five sandstone slabs, arranged alternately. Four of the granite blocks have fallen.

=== Machrie Moor 2 ===
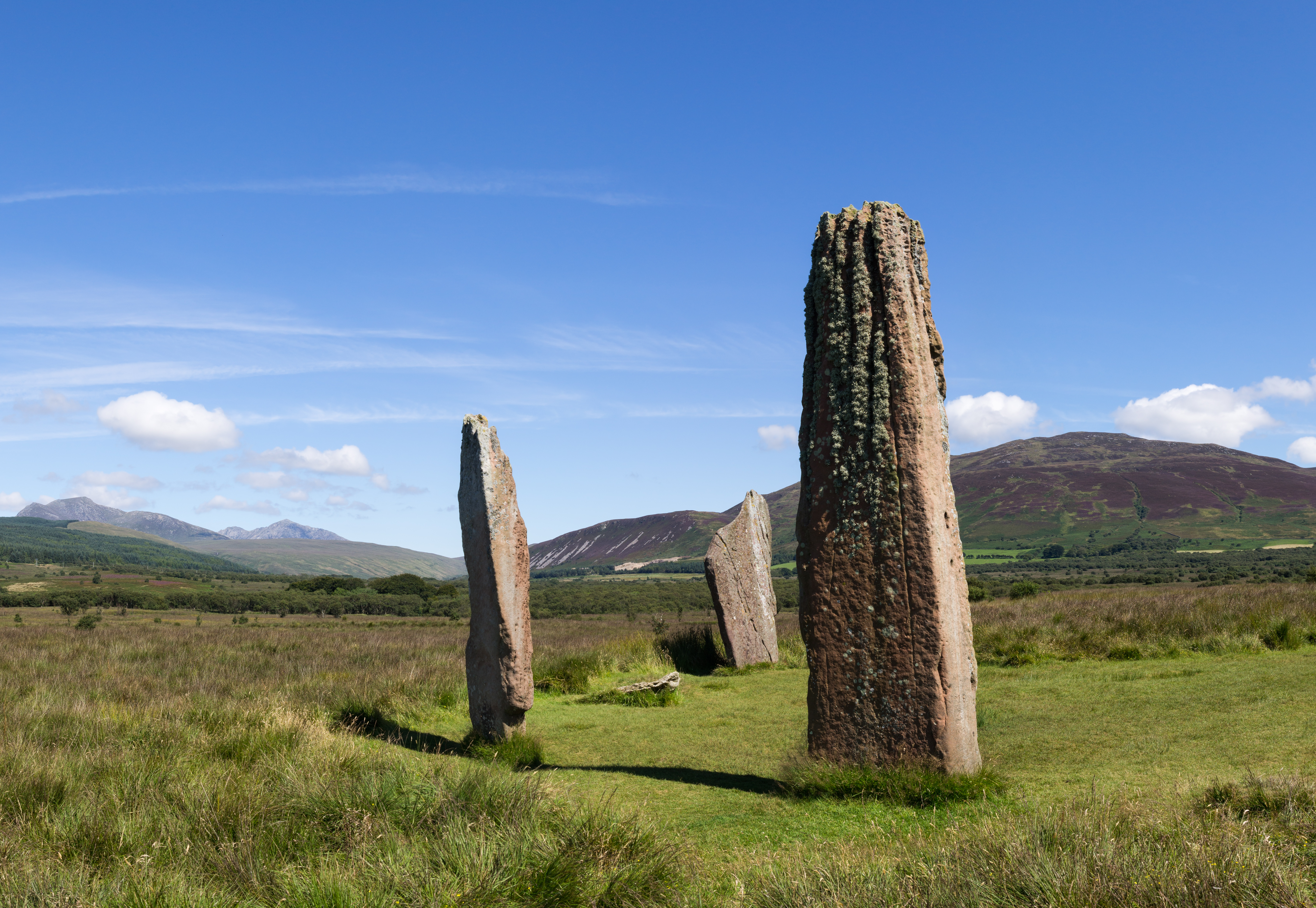
Machrie Stone Circle 2

Machrie Moor 2 (grid reference NR91143241) is the most visually striking of the circles on Machrie Moor. This circle has a diameter of 13.7 metres, and may originally have consisted of seven or eight tall sandstone slabs, three of which survive intact, while stumps of others may be seen. The heights of the three intact stones range from 3.7 metres to 4.9 metres. Within the circle are two large stones, apparently cut from a fallen pillar, one of which now has a central hole as if for conversion to a millstone. Excavations in 1861 revealed a cist in the centre of the circle. A food vessel was found in this central cist. A second, empty, short cist was found between the centre and the northeast upright stone.

=== Machrie Moor 3 ===
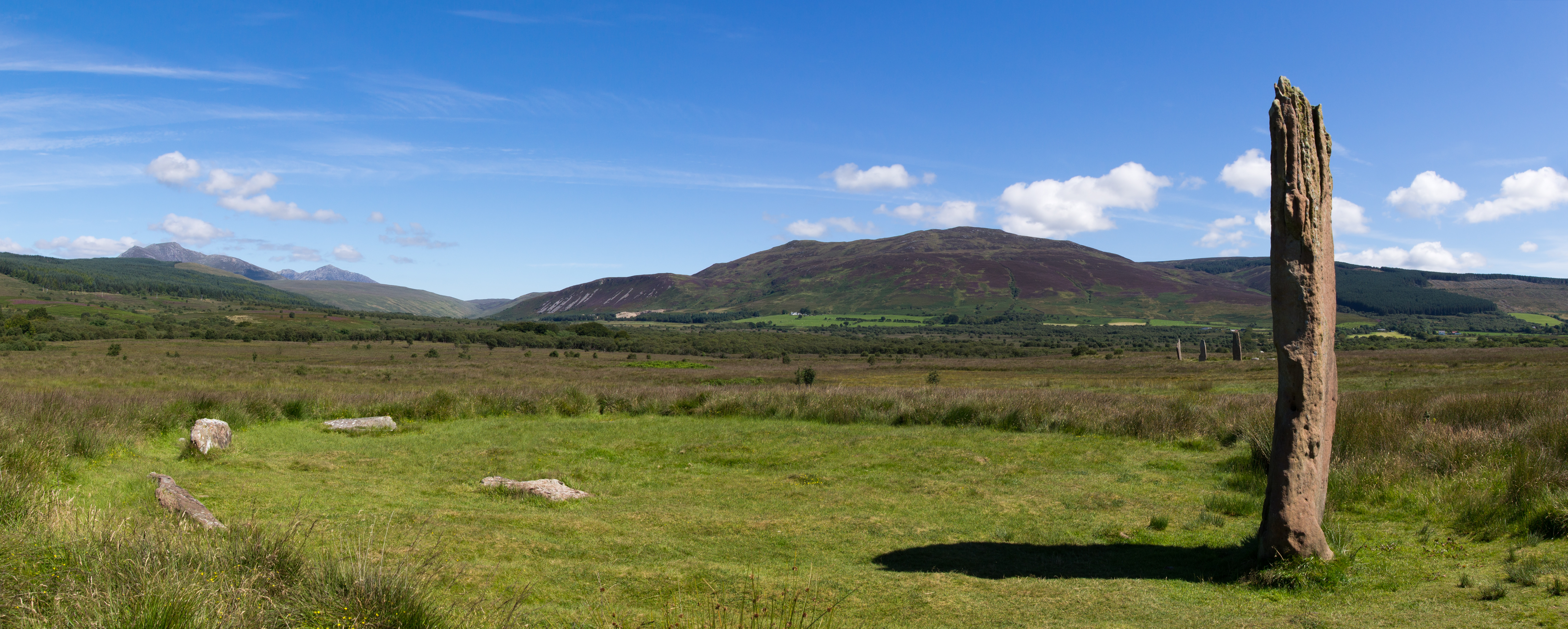
Machrie Stone Circle 3

Machrie Moor 3 (grid reference NR91023244) originally consisted of nine stones. Only one still stands, 4.3 metres high, but the stumps of others are still partially visible in the peat. The stones form a geometrical egg-shape. Excavations in 1861 uncovered a small cist in the centre containing an urn with some fragments of burnt bone and flint flakes. A second cist was found 1 metre south of the centre; it contained a crouched burial, also with some flint flakes.

=== Machrie Moor 4 ===
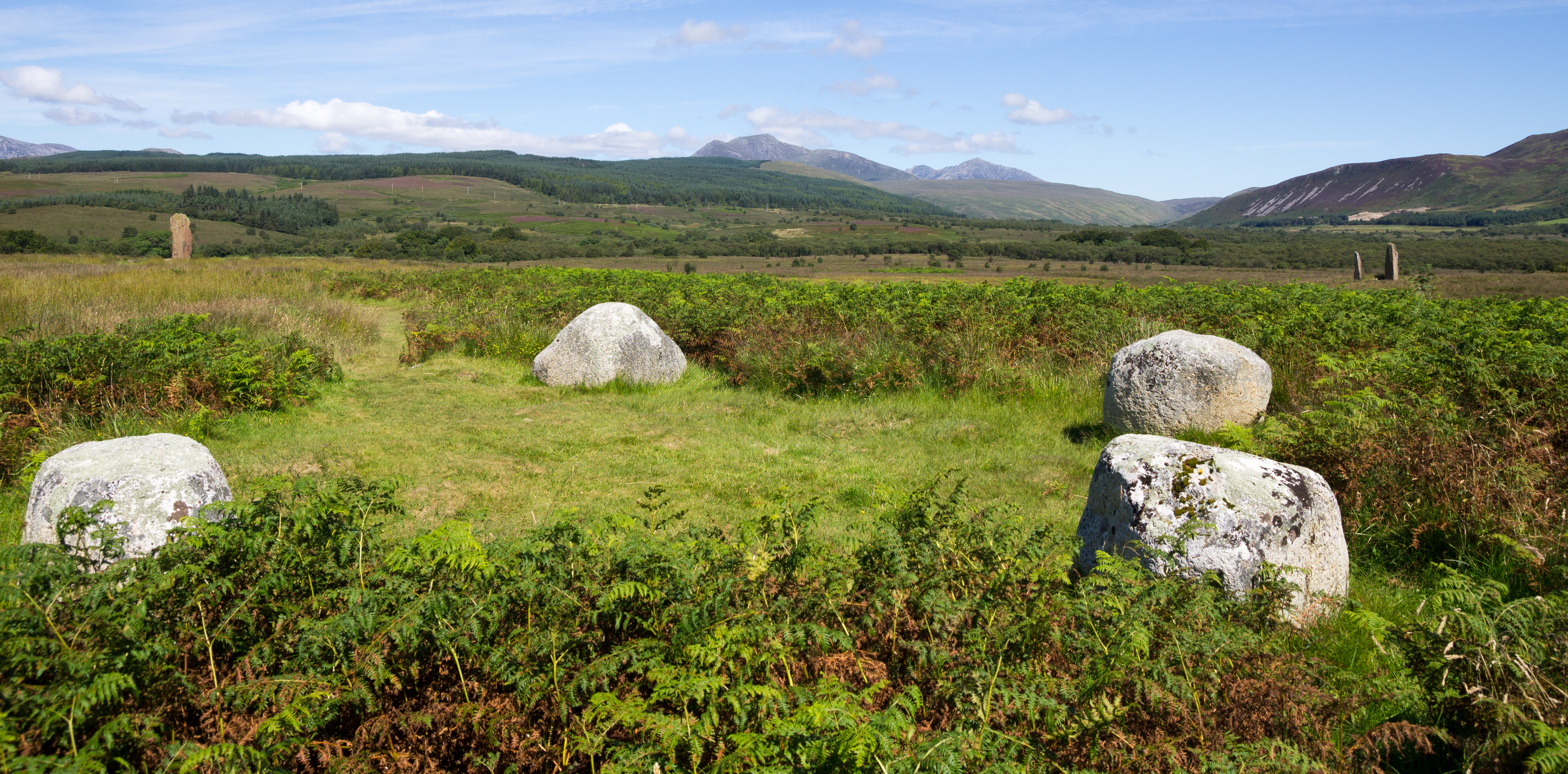
Machrie Stone Circle 4

Machrie Moor 4 (grid reference NR91003235) consists of four granite blocks, about 0.9 metres high. Excavations in 1861 uncovered a cist in the centre. In it was an inhumation accompanied by a food vessel, a bronze awl, and three flint flakes.

=== Machrie Moor 5 ===
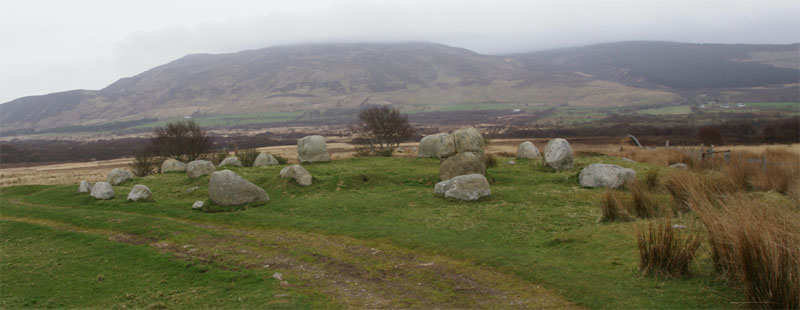
Machrie Stone Circle 5

Machrie Moor 5 (grid reference NR90873234) called "Suidh Coire Fhionn" or "Fingal's Cauldron Seat" consists of two concentric rings of granite boulders. The inner circle is 12.0 metres in diameter and consists of eight granite boulders. Excavations in 1861 uncovered an empty, ruined cist in the centre. The outer circle is approximately 18.0 metres in diameter and is formed of fifteen granite boulders. The outer circle is said to form a geometrical egg-shape.

=== Machrie Moor 11 ===
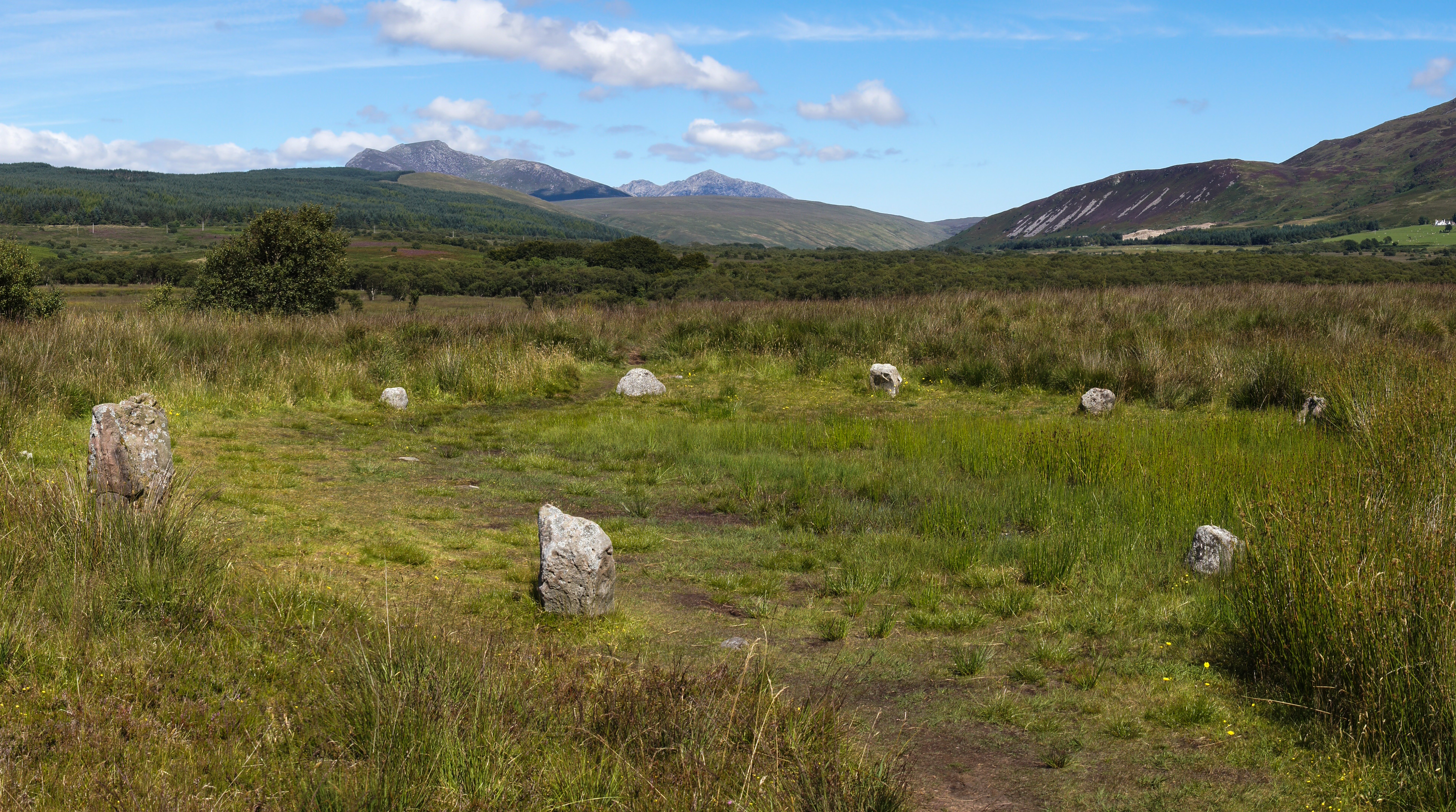
Machrie Stone Circle 11

Machrie Moor 11 (grid reference NR91213242) is a low stone circle with a diameter of around 13 metres. The tallest of the stones is about 1.2 metres high on the western side. Excavations in 1978-9 revealed 10 upright stones, with a pit between each stone possibly representing a post-hole.

=== Machrie Moor 12 ===
Machrie Moor 12 (grid reference NR91003240) is a buried feature discovered through geophysical survey by archaeologists from Historic Environment Scotland. Consisting of 12 pit-like anomalies that form a circular feature, the archaeologists state that there is no stone present in the pits, so the circle could have consisted of either timber or stone uprights.

=== Other prehistoric remains ===
James Bryce listed five other antiquities to the west of the stone circles in 1861. Machrie Moor 6 (grid reference NR90733237) is the remains of a possible chambered cairn consisting of two touching upright stone slabs at right angles. Machrie Moor 7 (grid reference NR90633253) is a standing stone 1.6 metres tall. Machrie Moor 8 (grid reference NR90573237) is the remains of a probable chambered cairn comprising an oval spread of stones approximately 20 metres by 16 metres. The most obvious feature is a 1.8-metre-tall (5.9 ft) standing stone within the east edge of the cairn surrounded by several smaller stones which may have been part of a chamber or facade. Machrie Moor 9 (grid reference NR905324) was a standing stone of which no obvious trace remains. Machrie Moor 10 (grid reference NR90053265) is the Moss Farm Road Stone Circle.

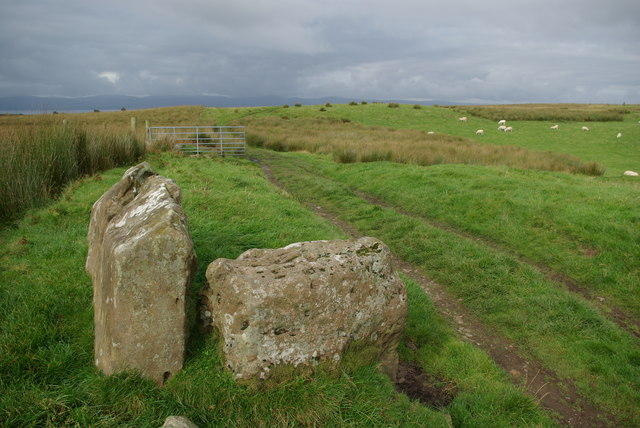
Machrie Moor 6

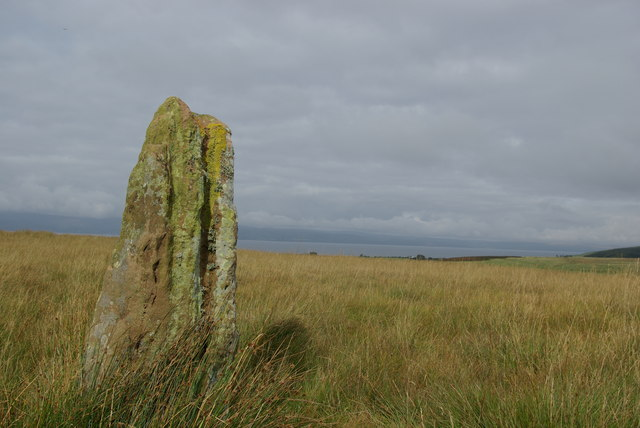
Machrie Moor 7

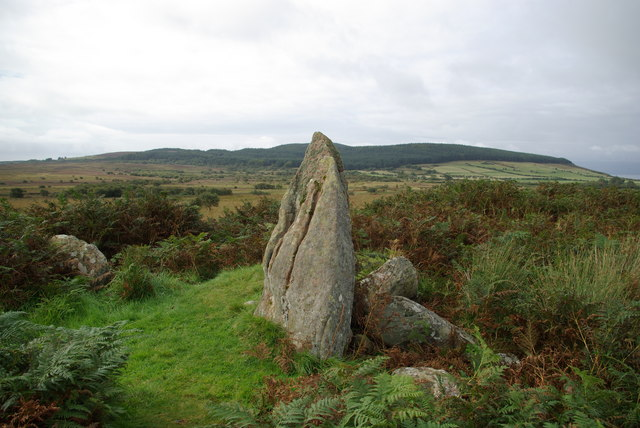
Machrie Moor 8

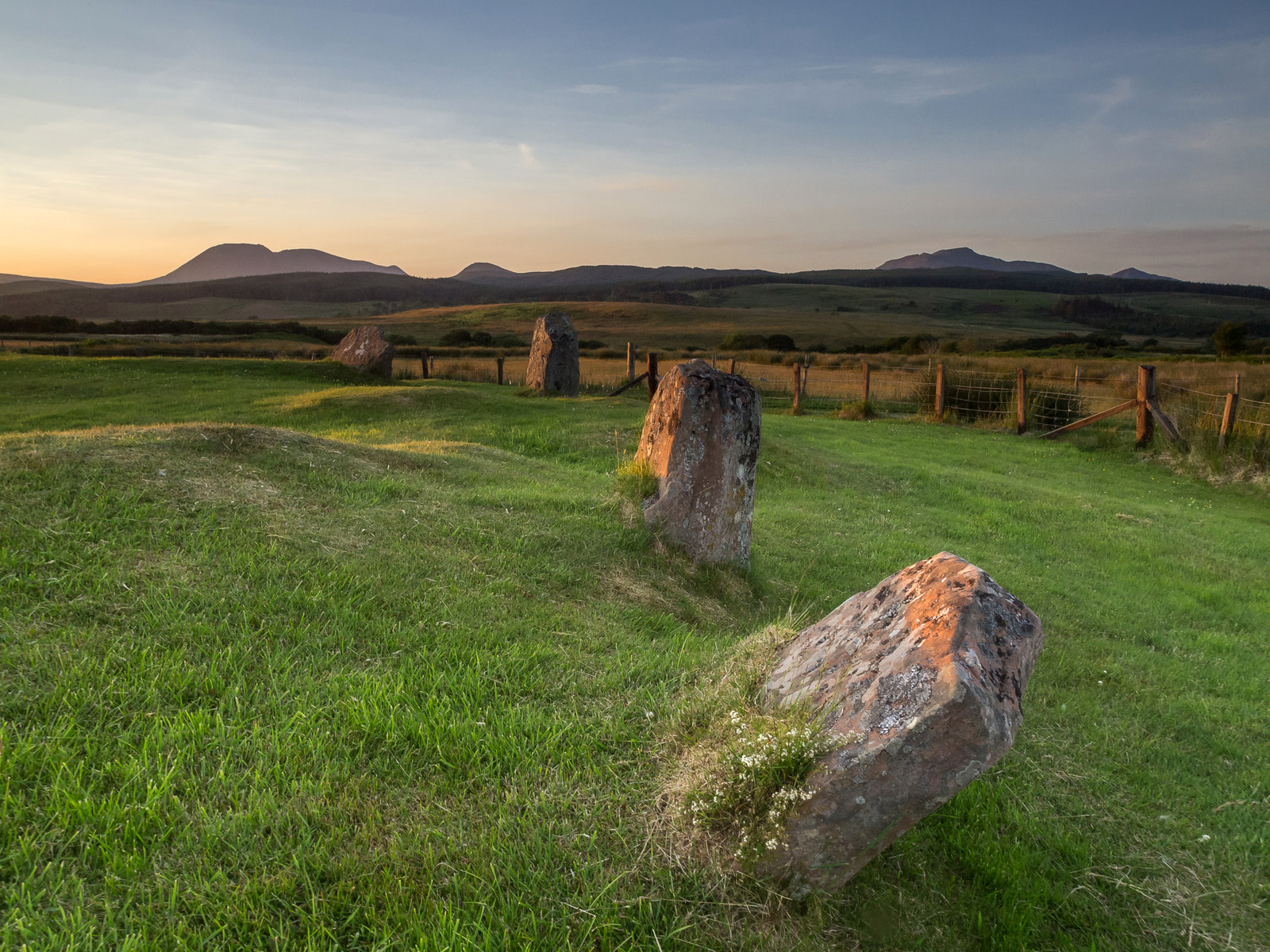
Machrie Moor 10

Around 1.2 kilometres to the east of the Machrie Moor Stone Circles, near the B880 road (grid reference NR92443225), is another stone-setting consisting of three granite boulders and which perhaps originally consisted of four stones.
