= Moss Farm Road Stone Circle =

Remains of a Bronze Age burial cairn on the Isle of Arran in Scotland

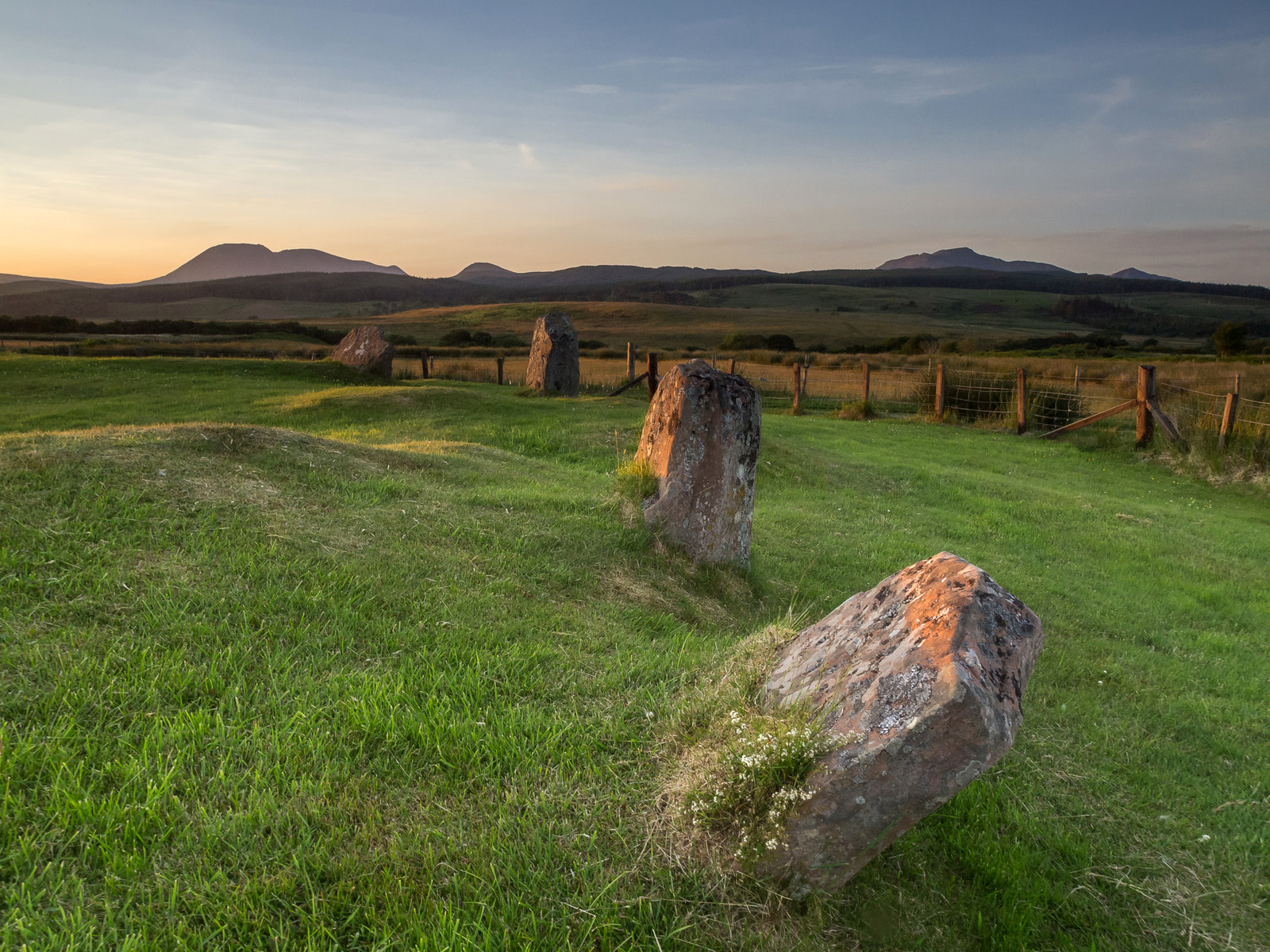
- Moss Farm Road Stone Circle

- Shown on Arran
- 55°32′31″N 5°19′46″W
- Type: Kerbed burial cairn
- Periods: Bronze Age
- Location: Isle of Arran

Site notes
- Owner: Historic Scotland
- Public access: Yes

Moss Farm Road Stone Circle (or Machrie Moor 10) is the remains of a Bronze Age burial cairn, surrounded by a circle of stones. It is located near Machrie on the Isle of Arran in Scotland (grid reference NR90063265).

== Description ==
The cairn and stone circle is situated 3 miles north of Blackwaterfoot on the west side of the Isle of Arran. Around 1 kilometre to the east are the Machrie Moor Stone Circles, and this circle is sometimes known as Machrie Moor Circle 10.

The cairn has been robbed for stone, and a modern fence and a farm track have cut through the north side of the site. It was once surrounded by a complete circle of stones with a diameter of 23 metres, but many have been removed. The kerb now consists of seven upright stones, around 1 metre high with at least five more large stones now on edge.
