= Moel Tŷ Uchaf =

Stone circle in Wales

Coordinates: 52.92335°N 3.40545°W

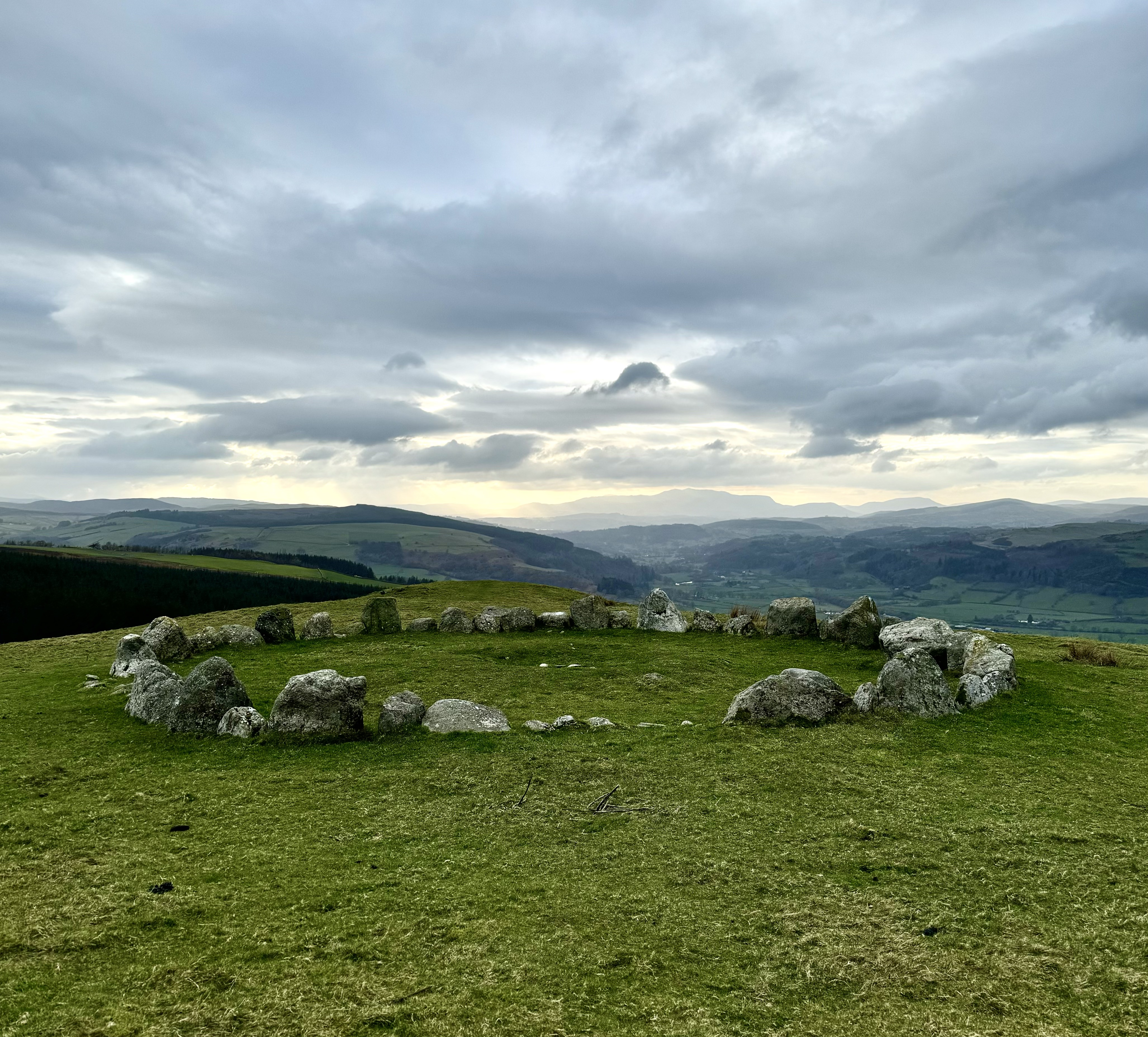
Looking towards Snowdonia

Moel Tŷ Uchaf is a stone circle (but most likely a ring cairn) near the village of Llandrillo, Denbighshire, north Wales.

== Description ==
It is a collection of 41 stones with a cist in the centre and an outlying stone to the north-north-east. The circle is 12 metres in diameter.

Moel Tŷ Uchaf is also the name of the hill on which the circle is located.
