= Threestoneburn Stone Circle =

Archaeological site in Northumberland, England

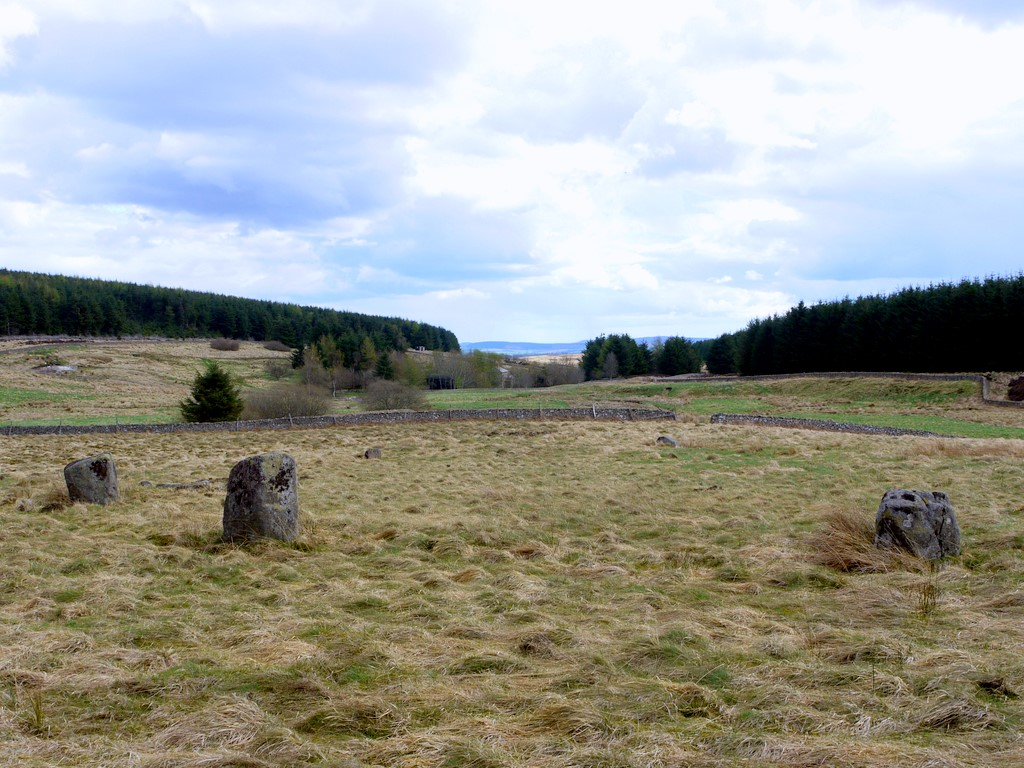
- Viewed from the west

- Location within Northumberland
- 55°28′41.880″N 2°2′48.912″W
- Type: Stone circle
- Periods: Late Neolithic/early Bronze Age
- Location: near Ilderton, Northumberland
- OS grid reference: NT 971 205

Site notes
- Excavation dates: 1856

Scheduled monument
- Designated: 28 November 1932
- Reference no.: 1019922

Threestoneburn Stone Circle is an archaeological site, a stone circle near the village of Ilderton and about 5 miles (8 km) south of Wooler, in Northumberland, England. It is a scheduled monument.

== Description ==
The circle, of the late Neolithic or early Bronze Age, is situated in a large clearing in the modern afforestation of Threestoneburn Wood, formerly overlooking a spacious valley to the east. It is on a slight promontory near the confluence of Threestone Burn and one of its tributaries. Its dimensions are 36 metres (118 ft) north-west to south-east by 30 metres (98 ft) north-east to south-west. There are 16 stones of local pink granite, set about 5.5 metres (18 ft) apart; a larger gap on the east side is thought to be an original entrance. Four of these are upright, with heights 0.7 to 1.3 metres (2 ft 4 in to 4 ft 3 in); the rest are recumbent.

About 28 metres (92 ft) to the north are two granite stones, one of which is recumbent; immediately to their east is an alignment of three stones lying in the surface layer of peat, 9 metres (30 ft) apart.

=== Excavation ===
There was partial excavation in 1856. A thick layer of peat was found above the ground surface. A flint tool was found, and spreads of charcoal which may be the traces of fire-rituals.

== See also ==
- Stone circles in the British Isles and Brittany
