= Ville-ès-Nouaux =

Neolithic site in Saint Helier, Jersey

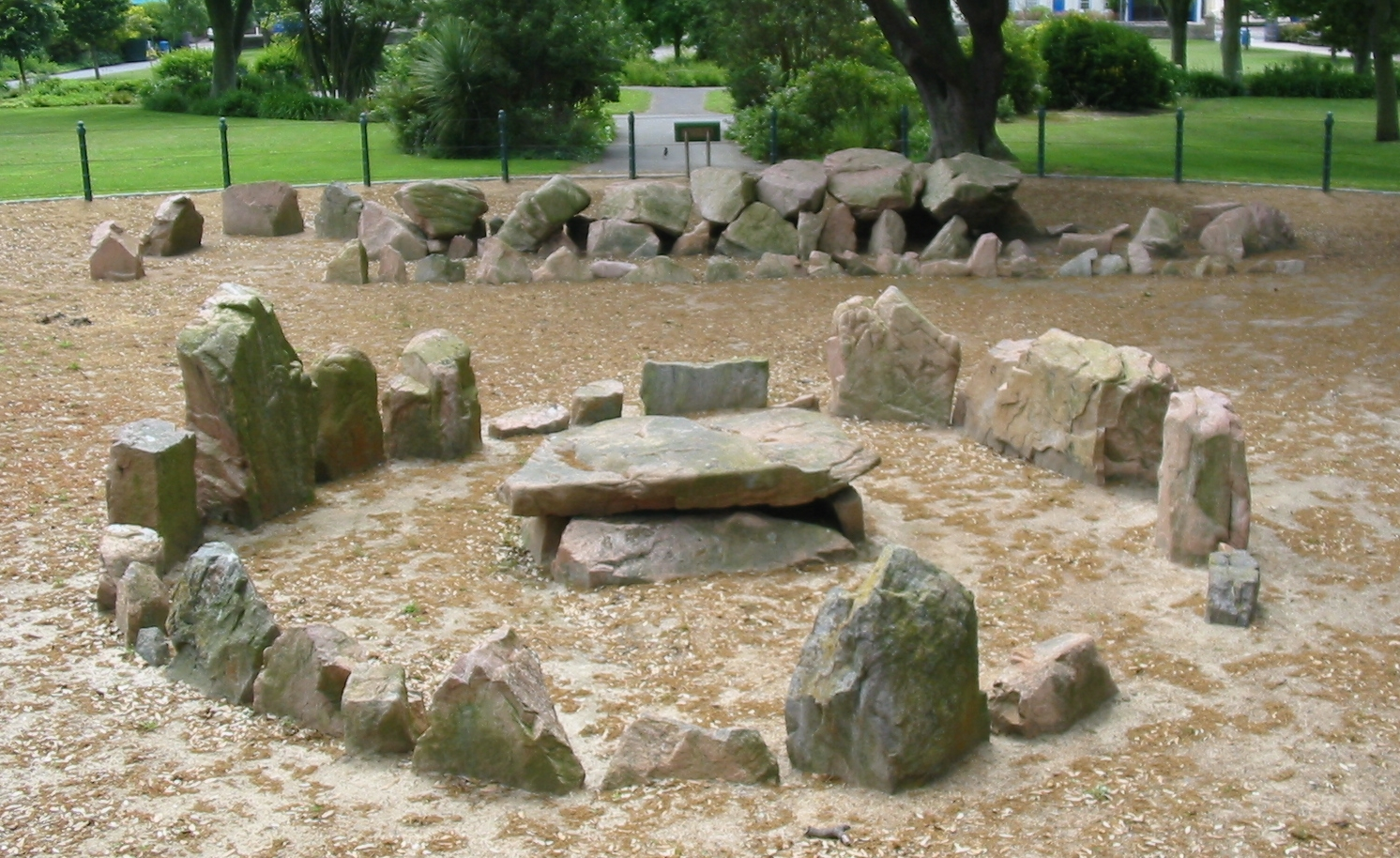
- The stone circle in 2008

- Location within Channel Islands
- 49°11′47″N 2°7′50″W
- Type: Dolmen; Stone circle
- Location: Saint Helier, Jersey

History
- Built: c. 2400 BC

Site notes
- Material: Stone
- Diameter: 6.4 m (21 ft)

Ville-ès-Nouaux is a Neolithic site, located in the parish of Saint Helier on the island of Jersey. It consists of a gallery tomb and a dolmen surrounded by a stone circle.

The complex dates back to the late Neolithic period (2800–2000 BC). The gallery tomb, with the entrance facing south, is 5.8 meters long. Inside, ceramic vessels were found, including goblets and bowls, as well as an archery plate. The dolmen is surrounded by a stone circle measuring 6.4 × 5.8 meters and consists of a small chamber measuring 1.2 × 1 meters and only 30 cm high, covered with a stone slab supported by four load-bearing boulders. During the archaeological excavations carried out in 1883, only a few flint chips were found inside the dolmen.
