= Upper Plym Valley =

Area of Dartmoor, Devon, England

Coordinates: 50.479°N 3.988°W

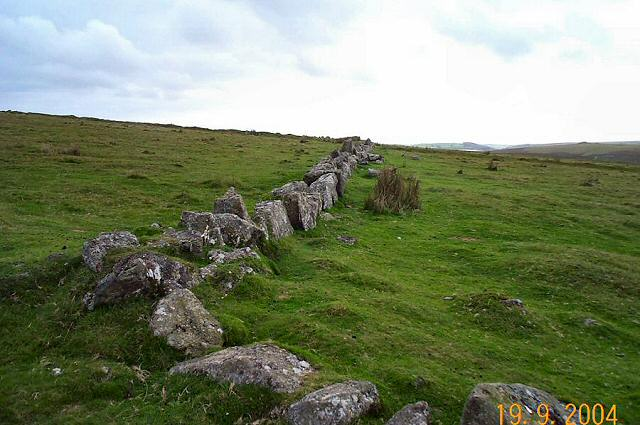
Bronze Age reave (field boundary) at Hentor Warren

The Upper Plym Valley is an area of Dartmoor, Devon, England, particularly noted for a large array of archaeological sites ranging from prehistoric Drizzlecombe to 19th century Eylesbarrow Mine. It contains some 300 Bronze Age and medieval sites, covering 15 1/2 square kilometres (6 sq mi) of Dartmoor landscape.
