= Ilderton, Northumberland =

Village in Northumberland, England

Coordinates: 55.4873°N 1.9778°W

Ilderton
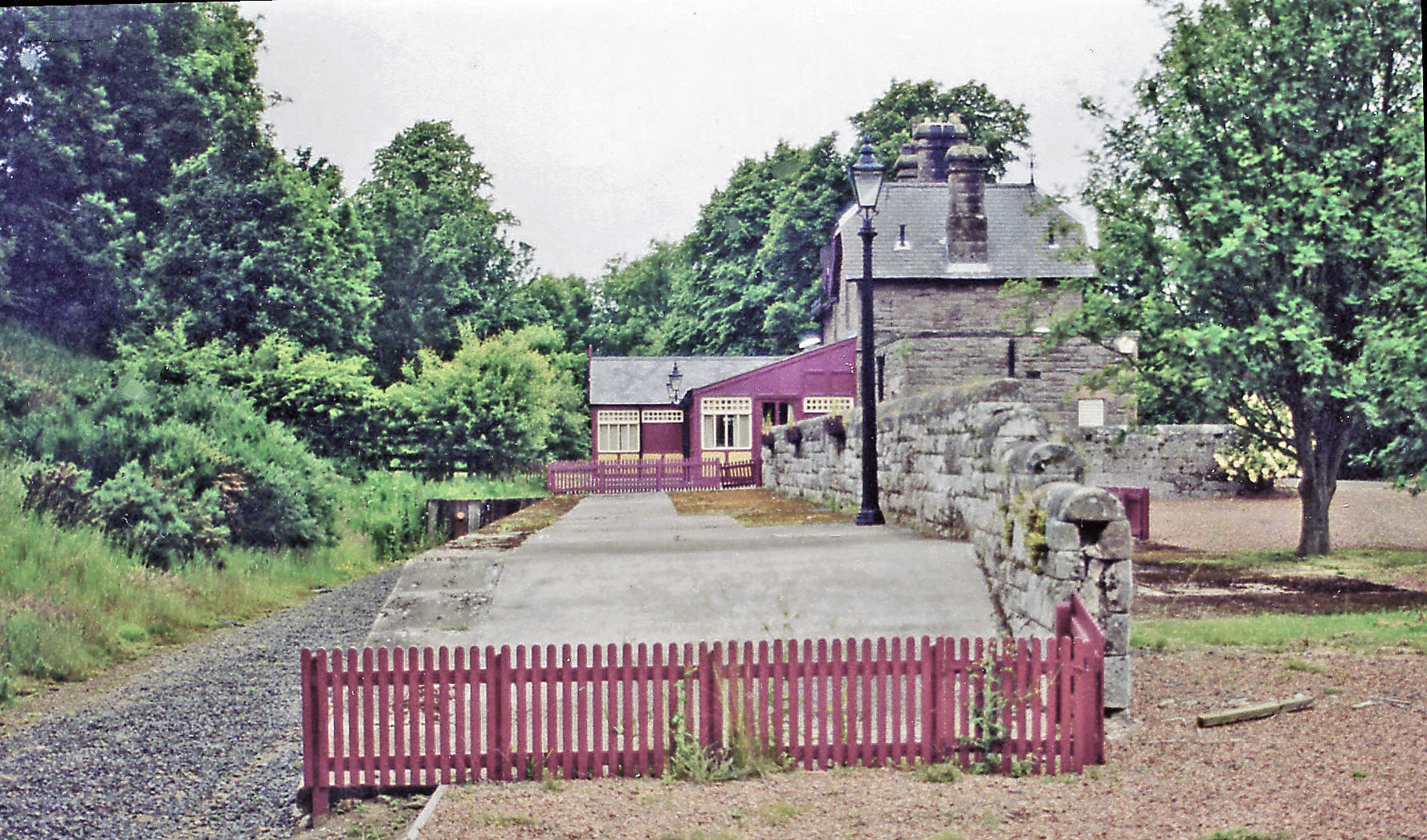
- The former Ilderton railway station

- Location within Northumberland
- Population: 235 (2011 census)
- OS grid reference: NU015215
- Civil parish: Ilderton
- Unitary authority: Northumberland
- Ceremonial county: Northumberland
- Region: North East
- Country: England
- Sovereign state: United Kingdom
- Post town: Alnwick
- Postcode district: NE66
- Police: Northumbria
- Fire: Northumberland
- Ambulance: North East
- UK Parliament: North Northumberland

Ilderton is a village and civil parish in Northumberland, England. It is located on the edge of the Northumberland National Park, between Lilburn, Northumberland in the east and Hedgehope Hill in the west. In 2011 the parish had a population of 235.

The place-name 'Ilderton' is first attested in Charter Rolls of circa 1125 as Ildretona, and as Hildreton during the reign of Henry II. The name means 'elder town or settlement', the word 'elder' referring to the tree of that name.

== Landmarks ==
The parish church of St Michael retains a thirteenth-century tower. In the churchyard at its western edge is the stone-built Roddam Mausoleum, which is tunnel-vaulted inside. Dating from 1795, it contains the tomb of Admiral Robert Roddam.

The area is noted for its large number of earthworks and remains of prehistoric settlements, for example the stone circle in Threestoneburn Wood to the west.
