= Scheduled monuments in Dumfries and Galloway =

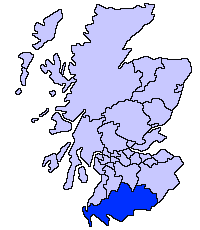
Dumfries and Galloway shown within Scotland

A scheduled monument in Scotland is a nationally important archaeological site or monument which is given legal protection by being placed on a list (or "schedule") maintained by Historic Environment Scotland. The aim of scheduling is to preserve the country's most significant sites and monuments as far as possible in the form in which they have been inherited.

The process of scheduling is governed by the Ancient Monuments and Archaeological Areas Act 1979, which aims "to make provision for the investigation, preservation and recording of matters of archaeological or historical interest". The term "scheduled monument" can apply to the whole range of archaeological sites which have been deliberately constructed by human activity but are not always visible above ground. They range from prehistoric standing stones and burial sites, through Roman remains and medieval structures such as castles and monasteries, to later structures such as industrial sites and buildings constructed for the World Wars. Some buildings or structures which were both scheduled and listed have had their listing designations removed to reduce the duplication.

In 2017 there were 8238 scheduled monuments in Scotland.

== Notable Scheduled Monuments in Dumfries and Galloway ==
| Name | Location | Description | Ref No | Image |
|---|---|---|---|---|
| Little Hartfell Stone Circle | Hutton And Corrie | Remains of Neolithic/Bronze Age stone circle | SM636 | |
| Twelve Apostles Stone Circle | Holywood | Prehistoric stone circle | SM641 | |
| Burnswark Hill | Hoddom | Traces of fort and Roman camps | SM667 | |
| Auchen Castle | Moffat | Remains of Auchen Castle | SM683 | |
| Crichton Peel and Sanquhar Castle | Sanquhar | Ruined castle | SM687 | |
| Mote of Annan | Annan | Traces of 12th-century motte and bailey castle | SM702 | |
| Repentance Tower | Hoddom | Remains of an intact, roofed 17th-century watchtower | SM706 | |
| Tibbers Castle | Penpont | Remains of motte-and-bailey castle | SM711 | |
| Dumfries Old Bridge (Devorgilla Bridge) | Dumfries | Rebuilt 15th century bridge | SM715 | |
| Cairnderry chambered cairn | Minnigaff | Remains of cairn | SM1007 | |
| Glenquicken stone circle (Billy Diamond's Bridge stone circle) | Kirkmabreck | Remains of prehistoric stone circle | SM1023 | |
| High Banks Farm, cup and ring marks | Kirkcudbright | Cup and ring marked rocks | SM1028 | |
| Trusty's Hill | Anwoth | Fort and symbol stones | SM1100 | |
| Buittle Old Kirk | Buittle | Ruined church | SM1108 | |
| Buittle Castle | Buittle | Remains of medieval Balliol castle | SM1115 | |
| Castle Haven dun | Borgue | Restored dun | SM1116 | |
| Earlstoun Castle | St John's Town of Dalry | Tower house | SM1118 | |
| Plunton Castle | Borgue | 16th-century tower house | SM1129 | |
| Doon Castle Broch | Stoneykirk, Rhins of Galloway | Remains of an iron-age broch (fortified roundhouse) | SM1970 | |
| Portpatrick old parish kirk | Portpatrick | Roofless church with round tower | SM2008 | |
| Dunskey Castle | Portpatrick | Ruined 16th-century L-plan tower house | SM2017 | |
| Galdenoch Castle | Leswalt | Ruined tower-house | SM2018 | |
| Old Tower of Sorbie | Sorbie | Ruined 16th-century tower-house | SM2024 | |
| Kirkcudbright Castle (MacLellan's Castle) | Kirkcudbright | Ruined 16th century castle | SM2459 | |
| Cruggleton Castle | Sorbie | Remains of medieval castle | SM3811 | |
| Edingham Castle | Dalbeattie | Ruined tower-house | SM6412 | |
| Soulseat Abbey | Inch, Wigtownshire | Mound and gravestones marking site of abbey on promontary in Soulseat Loch | SM7426 | |
| Kenmure Castle | Kells | Ruined 16th- and 17th-century courtyard house of the Gordons of Lochinvar | SM7743 | |
| Girthon Old Kirk | Girthon | Roofless 17th-century church | SM7868 | |
| Cumstoun Castle | Twynholm | Remains of 16th-century castle | SM8263 | |
| Dalton Old Parish Church | Dalton | Remains of Dalton old parish church | SM8676 | |
| Auchenskeock Castle | Colvend and Southwick, near Dalbeattie | 17th-century tower house | SM10434 | |
| Whithorn Priory | Whithorn | Remains of a large early historic monastic settlement | SM12992 | |
| Barsalloch Fort | Mochrum | Traces of prehistoric fort | SM90030 | |
| Caerlaverock Castles (Old and New) | Caerlaverock | Ruined castles | SM90046 | |
| Cairn Holy I | Kirkmabreck | Chambered cairn | SM90049 | |
| Cairn Holy II | Kirkmabreck | Chambered cairn | SM90050 | |
| Cardoness Castle | Anwoth | Ruined tower house | SM90058 | |
| Carsluith Castle | Kirkmabreck | Ruined L-plan tower-house | SM90062 | |
| Drumcoltran Tower | Kirkgunzeon | 16th-century tower-house | SM90100 | |
| Drumtroddan cup markings | Mochrum | Cup and ring-marked rocks | SM90101 | |
| Drumtroddan standing stones | Mochrum | 3 standing stones | SM90102 | |
| Dundrennan Abbey | Dundrennan | Ruined 12th-century abbey | SM90114 | |
| Glenluce Abbey | Old Luce | Ruined 12th century Cistercian abbey | SM90153 | |
| Kirkmadrine Church | Stoneykirk | Old parish church of Kirkmadrine and early gravestones | SM90192 | |
| Lincluden Collegiate Church | Terregles, near Dumfries | Remains of a Collegiate Church | SM90200 | |
| Lochmaben Castle | Lochmaben | Ruined 13th/14th-century peel and castle | SM90205 | |
| Orchardton Tower | Buittle | Remains of late 15th-century circular tower house | SM90233 | |
| Rispain Camp | Whithorn | Earthworks of late Iron Age fort | SM90248 | |
| Sweetheart Abbey | New Abbey | Remains of 13th-century Cistercian Abbey | SM90293 | |
| Threave Castle | Balmaghie | Remains of 14th-century tower-house | SM90301 | |
| Torhouse Stone Circle | Wigtown | Prehistoric stone circle | SM90304 | |
| Wren's Egg | Glasserton, Wigtownshire | Standing stones | SM90316 | |

== See also ==
- List of Category A listed buildings in Dumfries and Galloway
