= List of stone circles in Dumfries and Galloway =

Locations of well-preserved stone circles in Dumfries and Galloway. 1. Cauldside Burn 2. Claughreid 3. Easthill 4. Girdle Stanes 5 Glenquicken 6. Loupin Stanes 7. Seven Brethren 8. Standing Stones of Glenterrow 9. Torhouskie 10. Twelve Apostles 11. Whitcastles

This is a list of stone circles located in the Dumfries and Galloway council area. It is compiled from Aubrey Burl's 'County Gazetteer of the Stone Circles in Britain, Ireland and Brittany' and the Royal Commission on the Ancient and Historical Monuments of Scotland's 'Canmore' database. Between them, these two sources list 61 stone circles in the region. Many of these have been destroyed, some remains have not been conclusively identified as stone circles, some were dubious before their destruction and some have not been located by modern surveys.

The following sites are the best preserved:

- Cauldside Burn
- Claughreid
- Easthill
- Girdle Stanes
- Glenquicken
- Loupin Stanes
- Seven Brethren
- Standing Stones of Glenterrow
- Torhouskie
- Twelve Apostles
- Whitcastles

Name	Image	Grid reference Coordinates	Former county Parish	Notes
Airdrie		NX 966 587; 54.912725°N 3.613694°W	Kirkcudbrightshire Kirkbean	A stone circle was recorded in the Old Statistical Account for the parish in 1794 and thirty years later by George Chalmers, but by 1893 the circle could not be found nor was there any local knowledge of the site.: RCAHMS classification: Stone circle (possible); Listed in Burl (2000): No
Bagbie		NX 4979 5639; 54.879681°N 4.342786°W	Kirkcudbrightshire Kirkmabreck	RCAHMS classification: Four poster stone circle; Listed in Burl (2000): Yes
Bombie		NX 7079 5018; 54.829781°N 4.01292°W	Kirkcudbrightshire Kirkcudbright	RCAHMS classification: Stone circle (possible); Listed in Burl (2000): No
Booth's Burn, Kirkslight Rig		NY 2221 8837; 55.183518°N 3.223108°W	Dumfriesshire Hutton and Corrie	RCAHMS classification: Cist(s) (possible), stone(s); Listed in Burl (2000): Yes (as Kirkslight Rig)
Branteth		NY 28 75; 55.068796°N 3.121181°W	Dumfriesshire Kirkpatrick-Fleming	RCAHMS classification: Stone circle (possible); Listed in Burl (2000): No
Broathill		NY 26 69; 55.014598°N 3.150946°W	Dumfriesshire Kirkpatrick-Fleming	RCAHMS classification: Stone circle; Listed in Burl (2000): No
Burntscarth Green Farm		NX 9898 8018; 55.105747°N 3.584863°W	Dumfriesshire Kirkmahoe	RCAHMS classification: Stone circle (possible); Listed in Burl (2000): No
Carlin Stone		NX 3255 4971; 54.814238°N 4.60734°W	Wigtownshire Mochrum	RCAHMS classification: Standing stone; Listed in Burl (2000): Yes (as Eldrig Loch)
Cauldside Burn		NX 5295 5711; 54.887086°N 4.293943°W	Kirkcudbrightshire Anwoth	RCAHMS classification: Stone circle; Listed in Burl (2000): Yes
Clachanmore		NX 083 467; 54.778958°N 4.981531°W	Wigtownshire Stoneykirk	RCAHMS classification: Stone circle (possible); Listed in Burl (2000): No
Claughreid		NX 5178 5600; 54.876774°N 4.311595°W	Kirkcudbrightshire Kirkmabreck	RCAHMS classification: Stone circle; Listed in Burl (2000): Yes
Claywarnies		NX 10 71; 55.00189°N 4.96443°W	Wigtownshire Inch	RCAHMS classification: Stone circle (possible); Listed in Burl (2005):
Drumfern		NX 3999 7099; 55.007715°N 4.503519°W	Kirkcudbrightshire Minnigaff	RCAHMS classification: Stone circle; Listed in Burl (2000): Yes (as Drandnandow)
Drummore		NX 6884 4597; 54.791465°N 4.041347°W	Kirkcudbrightshire Kirkcudbright	RCAHMS classification: Stone circle; Listed in Burl (2000): Yes
Easthill		NX 9193 7388; 55.047673°N 3.692922°W	Kirkcudbrightshire Lochrutton	RCAHMS classification: Stone circle; Listed in Burl (2000): Yes
Ernespie		NX 7747 6321; 54.948487°N 3.91454°W	Kirkcudbrightshire Kelton	RCAHMS classification: Standing stone(s), stone circle (possible); Listed in Burl (2000): Yes
Foregirth Farm		NX 95 83; 55.134801°N 3.640683°W	Dumfriesshire Kirkmahoe	RCAHMS classification: Stone circle; Listed in Burl (2000): No
Glaisters		NX 761 801; 55.100252°N 3.942559°W	Kirkcudbrightshire Kirkpatrick Durham	RCAHMS classification: stone circle (possible) (as Gaisters); Listed in Burl (2000): No
Glenjorrie		NX 206 581; 54.885829°N 4.79761°W	Wigtownshire Old Luce	RCAHMS classification: Stone circle (possible); Listed in Burl (2000): No
Girdle Stanes		NY 2535 9615; 55.253898°N 3.175867°W	Dumfriesshire Eskdalemuir	RCAHMS classification: Stone circle; Listed in Burl (2000): Yes
Glenquicken		NX 5096 5821; 54.897385°N 4.328997°W	Kirkcudbrightshire Kirkmabreck	RCAHMS classification: Stone circle; Listed in Burl (2000): Yes (as Glenquickan N)
Glenquicken Moor 1		NX 5079 5830; 54.897131°N 4.328202°W	Kirkcudbrightshire Kirkmabreck	RCAHMS classification: Stone circle; Listed in Burl (2000): Yes (as Glenquickan S)
Glenquicken Moor 2		NX 5074 5833; 54.897385°N 4.328997°W	Kirkcudbrightshire Kirkmabreck	RCAHMS classification: Stone circle; Listed in Burl (2000): No
Glenturk		NX 424 579; 54.891381°N 4.458009°W	Wigtownshire Wigtown	RCAHMS classification: Standing stone (possible), stone circle (possible); Listed in Burl (2000): No
Greystone Park		NX 9798 7690; 55.07608°N 3.599354°W	Dumfriesshire Dumfries	RCAHMS classification: Stone circle; Listed in Burl (2000): Yes (as Greystone, The)
High Auchenlarie		NX 5395 5342; 54.854246°N 4.276497°W	Kirkcudbrightshire Anwoth	RCAHMS classification: Cairn, stone setting (possible); Listed in Burl (2000): Yes
Holm of Daltallochan		NX 5528 9422; 55.220978°N 4.276488°W	Kirkcudbrightshire Carsphairn	RCAHMS classification: Stone circle (possible); Listed in Burl (2000): Yes
Kirkbean Parish		NX 97 59; 54.919637°N 3.600708°W	Kirkcudbrightshire Kirkbean	RCAHMS classification: Stone circle (possible); Listed in Burl (2000): No
Kirkgunzeon		NX 8657 6668; 54.981808°N 3.773912°W	Kirkcudbrightshire Kirkgunzeon	RCAHMS classification: Stone circle; Listed in Burl (2000): Yes
Kirkhill		NY 1396 9592; 55.249974°N 3.354933°W	Dumfriesshire Wamphray	RCAHMS classification: Stone circle (possible); Listed in Burl (2000): Yes
Kirkmadrine		NX 0801 4848; 54.794401°N 4.987881°W	Wigtownshire Stoneykirk	RCAHMS classification: Stone circle (possible); Listed in Burl (2000): No
Knockshinnie		NX 6822 4517; 54.784118°N 4.05062°W	Kirkcudbrightshire Kirkcudbright	RCAHMS classification: Clearance cairn(s), quarry; Listed in Burl (2000): Yes
Laggangarn		NX 2223 7166; 55.007701°N 4.781301°W	Wigtownshire	RCAHMS classification: Standing stone(s); Listed in Burl (2000): Yes
Little Balmae		NX 691 447; 54.780544°N 4.036054°W	Kirkcudbrightshire Kirkcudbright	RCAHMS classification: Stone circle (possible); Listed in Burl (2000): Yes
Loch Mannoch 1		NX 6628 6143; 54.929626°N 4.088299°W	Kirkcudbrightshire Tongland	RCAHMS classification: Stone circle; Listed in Burl (2000): Yes (as Lairdmannoch)
Loch Mannoch 2		NX 663 615; 54.930676°N 4.087339°W	Kirkcudbrightshire Tongland	RCAHMS classification: Stone circle (possible); Listed in Burl (2000): No
Lochmaben Stane		NY 3123 6600; 54.983875°N 3.076073°W	Dumfriesshire Gretna	RCAHMS classification: Standing stone(s); Listed in Burl (2000): Yes
Longcastle		NX 3824 4810; 54.801653°N 4.517989°W	Wigtownshire Kirkinner	RCAHMS classification: Standing stone; Listed in Burl (2000): Yes
Loupin Stanes 1		NY 2570 9663; 55.258263°N 3.170489°W	Dumfriesshire Eskdalemuir	RCAHMS classification: Stone circle; Listed in Burl (2000): Yes (as Loupin' Stanes Centre)
Loupin Stanes 2		NY 256 966; 55.258389°N 3.171358°W	Dumfriesshire Eskdalemuir	RCAHMS classification: Not listed; Listed in Burl (2000): Yes (as Loupin' Stanes NW)
Loupin Stanes 3		NY 258 965; 55.257521°N 3.168186°W	Dumfriesshire Eskdalemuir	RCAHMS classification: Not listed; Listed in Burl (2000): Yes (as Loupin' Stanes SE)
Mains of Southwick		NX 93 57; 54.900834°N 3.662346°W	Kirkcudbrightshire Colvend and Southwick	RCAHMS classification: Stone circle (possible); Listed in Burl (2000): No
Miltonise		NX 1925 7405; 55.028078°N 4.829349°W	Wigtownshire New Luce	RCAHMS classification: Cairn(s); Listed in Burl (2000): Yes (as Miltonish)
Morton Old Church		NX 8902 9696; 55.25433°N 3.747485°W	Dumfriesshire Morton	RCAHMS classification: Stone circle (possible); Listed in Burl (2000): No
Newlands		NX 96 85; 55.152976°N 3.625735°W	Dumfriesshire Kirkmahoe	RCAHMS classification: Stone circle (possible); Listed in Burl (2000): No
Park, Tongland		NX 6996 5609; 54.882642°N 4.028495°W	Kirkcudbrightshire Tongland	RCAHMS classification: Kerb cairn; Listed in Burl (2000): Yes (as Park of Tongland)
Queen Mary's Bridge		NX 7030 5476; 54.870786°N 4.022601°W	Kirkcudbrightshire Tongland	RCAHMS classification: Stone circle; Listed in Burl (2000): No
Seven Brethren		NY 2171 8269; 55.132411°N 3.229387°W	Dumfriesshire Tundergarth	RCAHMS classification: Stone circle; Listed in Burl (2000): Yes (as Whiteholm Rigg)
Shore Plantation		NX 6750 4636; 54.794615°N 4.062352°W	Kirkcudbrightshire Kirkcudbright	RCAHMS classification: Stone circle (possible); Listed in Burl (2000): No
Standing Stones of Balmennoch		NX 06 57; 54.874719°N 5.017445°W	Wigtownshire Inch	RCAHMS classification: Stone circle; Listed in Burl (2000): Yes (as Balmannoch)
Standing Stones of Glenterrow		NX 1453 6251; 54.922772°N 4.895622°W	Wigtownshire Inch	RCAHMS classification: Stone circle; Listed in Burl (2000): Yes (as Glentirrow)
Steeps Park		NX 248 531; 54.842437°N 4.72918°W	Wigtownshire Old Luce	RCAHMS classification: Stone circle (possible); Listed in Burl (2000): Yes
Stroan Loch		NX 640 709; 55.014467°N 4.127666°W	Kirkcudbrightshire Kells	RCAHMS classification: Stone circle; Listed in Burl (2000): Yes (as Loch Stroan)
Strongassel		NX 5923 8684; 55.155854°N 4.210771°W	Kirkcudbrightshire Kells	RCAHMS classification: Clearance cairn(s); Listed in Burl (2000): Yes (as Stroangassel)
Templand Mains		NX 8771 9396; 55.227089°N 3.766889°W	Dumfriesshire Closeburn	RCAHMS classification: Standing stone; Listed in Burl (2000): Yes (as Kirkbog)
The Thieves		NX 4044 7159; 55.013246°N 4.496825°W	Kirkcudbrightshire Minnigaff	RCAHMS classification: Standing stone(s); Listed in Burl (2000): Yes
Three Piked Stane		NY 2170 6787; 54.999266°N 3.225467°W	Dumfriesshire Annan	RCAHMS classification: Stone circle (possible); Listed in Burl (2000): Yes (as Woodhead)
Torhouskie 1		NX 3825 5649; 54.876979°N 4.52253°W	Wigtownshire Wigtown	RCAHMS classification: Stone circle; Listed in Burl (2000): Yes (as Torhouskie E)
Torhouskie 2		NX 3820 5644; 54.876514°N 4.52328°W	Wigtownshire Wigtown	RCAHMS classification: Standing stone(s); Listed in Burl (2000): Yes (as Torhouskie W)
Twelve Apostles		NX 9470 7940; 55.09785°N 3.651629°W	Dumfriesshire Holywood	RCAHMS classification: Stone circle; Listed in Burl (2000): Yes
Wallace's Putting Stone		NX 7016 4381; 54.77241°N 4.019865°W	Kirkcudbrightshire Kirkcudbright	RCAHMS classification: Stone circle (possible); Listed in Burl (2000): No
Westerkirk Mains		NY 29 91; 55.212687°N 3.109507°W	Dumfriesshire Westerkirk	RCAHMS classification: Stone circle (possible); Listed in Burl (2000): Yes (as Westerkirk)
Whitcastles		NY 2240 8806; 55.180763°N 3.220039°W	Dumfriesshire Hutton and Corrie	RCAHMS classification: Stone circle; Listed in Burl (2005):
Windy Edge		NY 4304 8389; 55.146108°N 2.895135°W	Dumfriesshire Canonbie	RCAHMS classification: Cairn (possible), standing stone(s); Listed in Burl (2000): Yes

== See also ==
- Stone circles in the British Isles and Brittany
- List of stone circles in the Scottish Borders
- List of stone circles
