= Nine Stones =

Nine Stones may refer to:

- Nine Stones, Altarnun, a prehistoric monument on Bodmin Moor, Cornwall, England
- Nine Stones, Winterbourne Abbas, a prehistoric monument in Dorset, England
- Nine Stones Close, a prehistoric monument in Derbyshire, England
- Ninestane Rig, a prehistoric monument in the Scottish Borders
- Boskednan stone circle, a prehistoric monument near Penzance, Cornwall, England
