= Kirkmabreck =

Coordinates: 54.900°N 4.378°W

Kirkmabreck: Scottish Gaelic: Cill Mo Bhreac
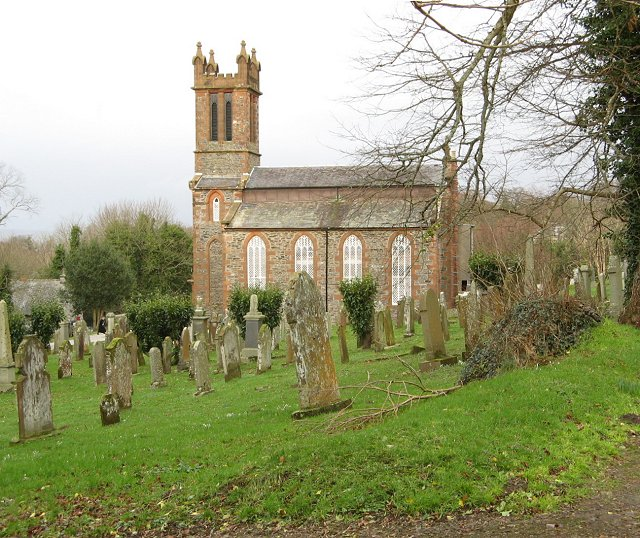
- Kirkmabreck Church

- Location within Dumfries and Galloway
- Population: 1,000 (2011)
- OS grid reference: NX495542 (Carsluith)
- Council area: Dumfries and Galloway
- Lieutenancy area: Wigtown
- Country: Scotland
- Sovereign state: United Kingdom
- Post town: Newton Stewart
- Postcode district: DG8
- Dialling code: 01671
- Police: Scotland
- Fire: Scottish
- Ambulance: Scottish
- UK Parliament: Dumfries and Galloway
- Scottish Parliament: Galloway and West Dumfries

Kirkmabreck is a civil parish in the historic county of Kirkcudbrightshire, within the Dumfries and Galloway council area of Scotland.

Located in the historic Stewartry of Kirkcudbright and centred on the small town of Creetown, situated on the east bank of the River Cree near the head of Wigtown Bay, the parish extends northwards to the parishes of Minnigaff and Girthon, and westwards to Anwoth. It also includes the small coastal settlement of Carsluith, which is dominated by Carsluith Castle, a 16th-century tower house now in the care of Historic Environment Scotland. The parish covers approximately 25,000 acres (100 km^{2}).

Following the local government reorganisation of 1975, Kirkmabreck was one of two parishes from Kirkcudbrightshire incorporated into the Wigtown District (1975–1996). As a result, it now lies within the Wigtown lieutenancy area rather than the Stewartry of Kirkcudbright lieutenancy.

Among the principal archaeological and historical sites in the parish are the prehistoric chambered cairns at Cairnholy, also under the care of Historic Environment Scotland; the Glenquicken stone circle; and the cup and ring marked stones at Barholm, together with the remains of Barholm Castle.

The philosopher Thomas Brown (1778–1820), noted for his contributions to metaphysical thought, was born and buried in the parish.

== Military road ==
Heading west from Creetown and connecting with the Corse of Slakes road is an old military track built in the mid 18th century over an existing drove road to serve as a troop access route to and from Ireland.
