= Kirkmahoe =

Civil parish in Dumfries and Galloway, Scotland

Coordinates: 55.1°N 3.6°W

Kirkmahoe is a civil parish in Dumfries and Galloway, Scotland. The parish contains the settlements Kirkton, where the parish church is located, Dalswinton and Duncow. It is bounded by the parishes of Dumfries to the south, Holywood and Dunscore to the west, and Kirkmichael and Tinwald to the east.

The name Kirkmahoe commemorates St Kentigern, the patron saint of Glasgow. Mo Choe is the Gaelic equivalent of Mungo, the Cumbric hypocoristic form of Kentigern.

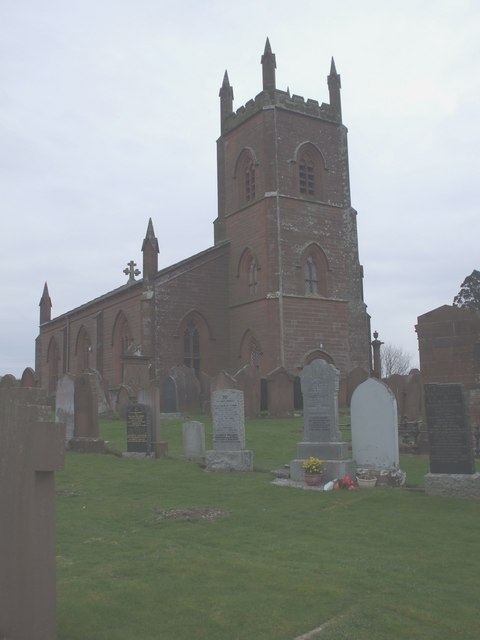
Kirkmahoe parish church, Kirkton
