= Ruskin Monument =

Monument to John Ruskin in Keswick, Cumbria, UK

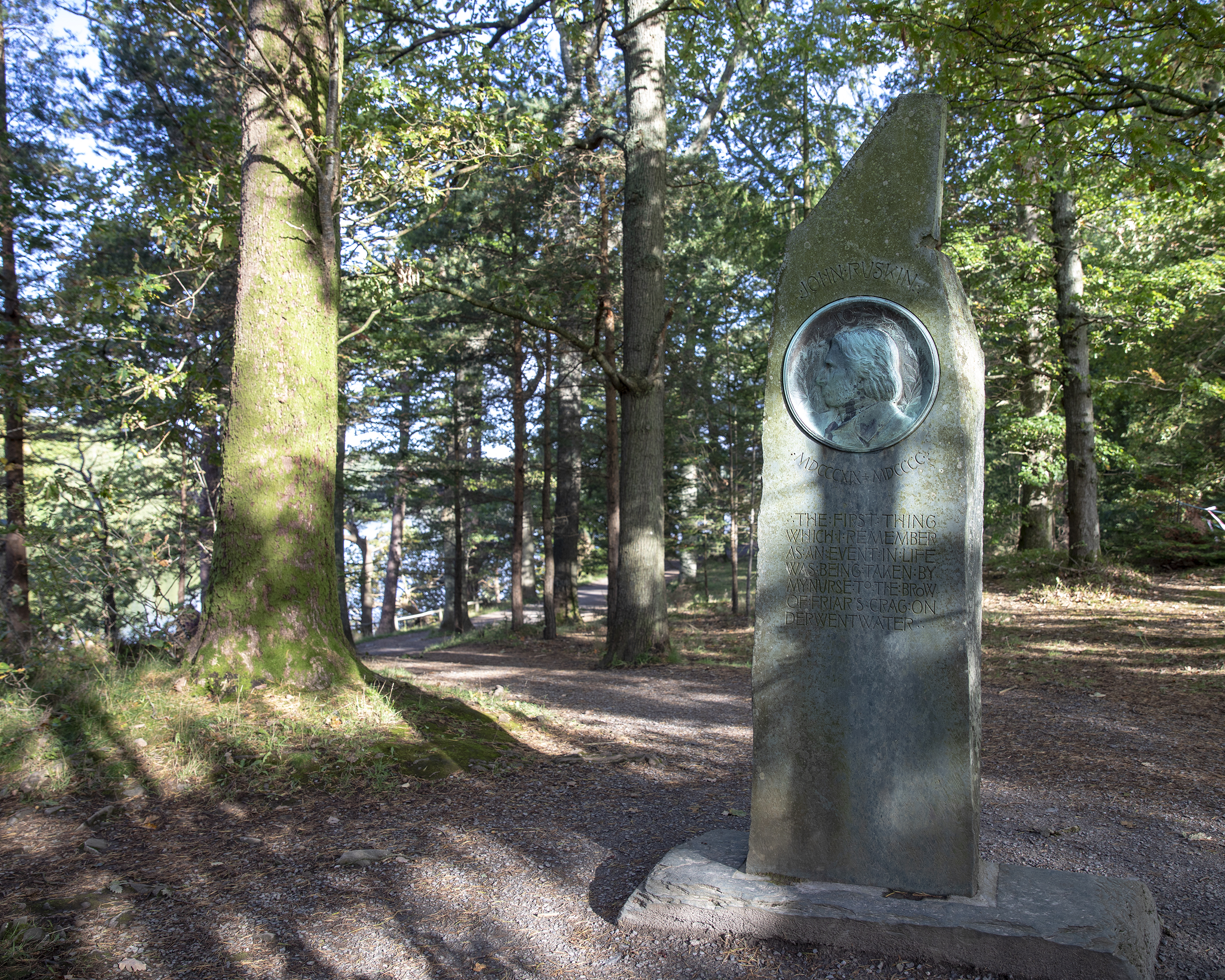
- Artist: Mr. Bromley and his nephew, stonecutters
- Year: 1900
- Medium: Borrowdale slate
- Designation: Grade II
- Location: Keswick, Cumbria; 54°35′25″N 3°08′28″W

Listed Building – Grade II
- Designated: 24 May 1977
- Reference no.: 1327119
- Website: https://historicengland.org.uk/listing/the-list/list-entry/1327119

The Ruskin Monument is a memorial to John Ruskin located on the edge of Derwentwater in the English Lakes at Friars' Crag, Keswick, Cumbria. It was erected on 6 October 1900, shortly after his death, largely through the efforts of Hardwicke Rawnsley.

The monument consists of a monolithic block of Borrowdale stone. It is of the type of the standing stones of Galloway, the earliest Christian monuments of the Celtic people, and was chosen as a link with Scotland, the land of Ruskin's fore-elders. Upon one side is incised a Chi-Rho enclosed in a circle after the fashion of the earliest crosses, with the following inscription beneath from Deucalion, Lecture xii., par. 40:

The Spirit of God is around you in the air that you breathe,—His glory in the light that you see; and in the fruitfulness of the earth, and the joy of its creatures, He has written for you, day by day, His revelation, as He has granted you, day by day, your daily bread.

On the other side of the monolith, facing the lake which Ruskin once described "as one of the three most beautiful scenes in Europe," there is a medallion in bronze, the work of Signor Lucchesi, representing Ruskin in profile as he was in the early 1870s, when he composed Fors Clavigera and was Slade Professor of Fine Art at the University of Oxford. A crown of wild olive is seen in the background of the panel, which is hollowed to give the profile high relief, and Ruskin's motto, "To-day," is among the olive leaves in the background over the head. Above the portrait is the name "John Ruskin," beneath are his dates 1819 to 1900. Beneath these again is incised an inscription taken from Modern Painters, vol. iii, ch. vxii:

The first thing which I remember, as an event in life, was being taken by my nurse to the brow of Friar's Crag on Derwent Water.

The lettering was designed and drawn by Ruskin's biographer, W. G. Collingwood, and was so designed to indicate Ruskin's dot and dash style of drawing. Ruskin wrote that "all monuments to individuals are, to a certain extent, triumphant; therefore, they must not be placed where nature has no elevation of character." The scene was chosen thus, like the stone, which exists quite naturally amidst its surroundings.
