= Duncow =

Coordinates: 55°08′04″N 3°37′20″W

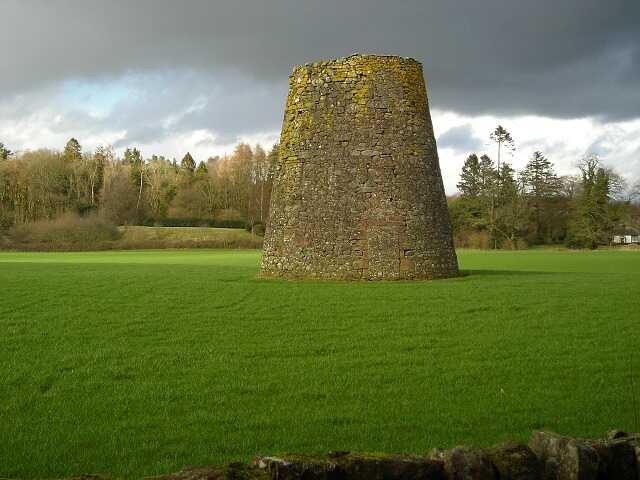
- The ruined windmill above the village.

- Location within Dumfries and Galloway
- OS grid reference: NX965833
- Council area: Dumfries and Galloway
- Lieutenancy area: Dumfries
- Country: Scotland
- Sovereign state: United Kingdom
- Post town: DUMFRIES
- Postcode district: DG1
- Police: Scotland
- Fire: Scottish
- Ambulance: Scottish
- UK Parliament: Dumfries and Galloway
- Scottish Parliament: Dumfriesshire

Duncow is a small settlement in the civil parish of Kirkmahoe, Dumfries and Galloway, Scotland. Located in the geographical centre of the parish, Duncow was a village in the eighteenth and nineteenth centuries and was formerly its most populous settlement. At the time the First Statistical Account of Scotland was written the village had between 150 and 200 residents. By the time of the Third Statistical Account there were only five houses in the village. It has had a school since at least the time of the New Statistical Account. The current school was opened in 1878 and has a roll of 24. The village post office closed in 1952.

The name Duncow, recorded as Duncol in 1250, is of Celtic origin, representing either Cumbric dīn + coll or Gaelic dùn-choll, both meaning 'fort of hazels'.
