= Ninestane Rig =

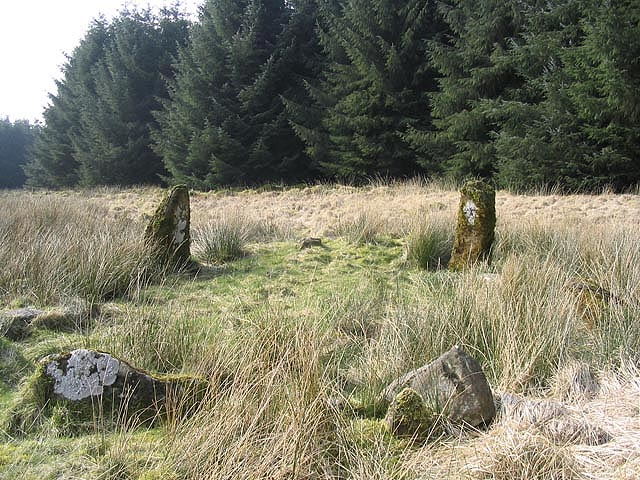
- Ninestane Rig stones in 2007
- Interactive map of Ninestane Rig
- 55°16′02.93″N 2°45′39.12″W
- Type: Stone circle
- Periods: Early Bronze Age
- Location: Between Newcastleton and Hawick, Liddesdale, Roxburghshire, Scottish Borders, Scotland

Scheduled monument
- Official name: Nine Stones stone circle
- Type: Prehistoric ritual and funerary: stone circle or ring
- Designated: 14 February 1958
- Reference no.: SM1688

Ninestane Rig (English: Nine Stone Ridge) is a small stone circle in Scotland near the English border. Located in Roxburghshire, near to Hermitage Castle, it was probably made between 2000 BC and 1250 BC, during the Late Neolithic or early Bronze Age (Bronze Age technology reached the Borders around 1750 BC). It is a scheduled monument (a nationally important archaeological site given special protections) and is part of a group with two other nearby ancient sites, these being Buck Stone standing stone and another standing stone at Greystone Hill. Settlements appear to have developed in the vicinity of these earlier ritual features in late prehistory and probably earlier.

The circle (actually slightly oval in form) consists of eight stones fast in the earth (a ninth stone has fallen inwards and lies flat), but six of these are now just stumps of 2 feet (0.61 m) or less. Of the two large standing stones remaining, one is a regular monolith a little under 7 feet (2.1 m) tall and the other, a pointed stone, is a little over 4 feet (1.2 m) tall. According to the Royal Commission on the Ancient and Historical Monuments of Scotland, a number of similar circles formerly existed in the immediate area; the stones have been removed, but the hollow in the center of each circle and marks in the earth showing the former positions of the stones are still visible. In the immediate area there is also a street of circular pits 8 to 10 feet (2.4 to 3.0 m) deep which may have formed the shelters of the people who set up the circles, although this is not certain.

Ninestane Rig is actually the name of the low hill (943 feet (287 m) high, 4 miles (6.4 km) long and 1 mile (1.6 km) broad) atop which the stone circle stands but is also usually used to designate the circle itself (which is also sometimes called Nine Stones, not be confused with the Nine Stones circle near Winterbourne Abbas in Dorset or the Nine Stones at Altarnun in Cornwall, nor Nine Stone Rig in East Lothian or Nine Standards Rigg in Cumbria.)

== Legendary boiling of William II de Soules ==
According to legend, William II de Soules, who was lord of Hermitage Castle, was arrested and boiled alive by his tenants at the site in 1320 in a cauldron suspended from the two large stones, on account of being a particularly oppressive and cruel landlord.

William was also a traitor (he conspired against Robert the Bruce) and, according to Walter Scott, by local reputation a sorcerer. In John Leyden's ballad Lord Soulis, William's mastery of the black arts (provided by his redcap familiar spirit and also learned from Michael Scot) was such that rope could not hold him, nor steel harm him, so (after True Thomas, who was present, had tried and failed to make magical ropes of sand) he was wrapped in a sheet of lead and boiled. According to Leyden's ballad, in his time (1775–1811) the locals still displayed the supposed cauldron used:

At the Skelf-hill, the cauldron still

The men of Liddesdale can show
And on the spot, where they boiled the pot,

The spreat and the deer-hair ne'er shall grow.

— John Leyden, "Lord Soulis"

However, William II de Soules was not actually boiled alive but died in prison in Dumbarton Castle, probably sometime before 20 April 1321 (and Leyden's kettle was actually a relic of the Old Pretender's rebel army of 1715, according to Walter Scott). It is believed that an earlier ancestor Ranulf II de Soules was killed in his teens by his servants in 1207 or 1208, on grounds of general vileness and wickedness; whether or not William's fate became commingled with Ranulf's in local oral tradition is now impossible to determine. Scott notes that "The tradition regarding the death of Lord Soulis, however singular, is not without a parallel in the real history of Scotland."

== See also ==
- List of stone circles in the Scottish Borders

== Notes ==
1. According to Gary Buckham. Martin McCarthy describes the taller stone as "a little under 6 feet (1.8 m) tall" while according to both the 1911 Encyclopedia Britannica and Walter Scott (writing around 1803) there are only five stones visible.
