= Wren's Egg =

The Wren's Egg
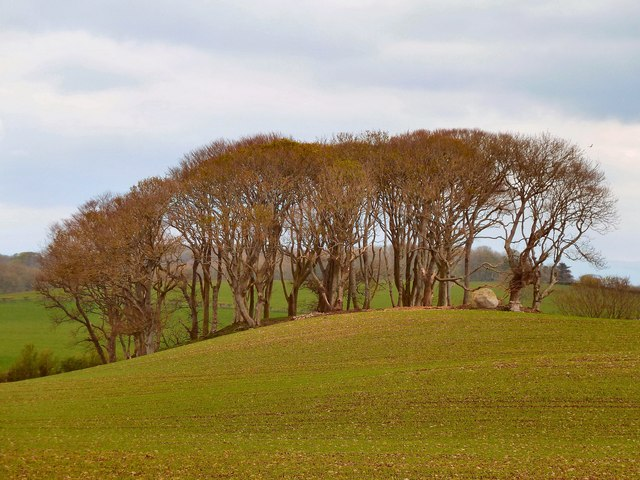

- Location within Dumfries and Galloway
- 54.746058°N 4.5478679°W

Scheduled monument
- Designated: 31 December 1921
- Reference no.: SM90316

The Wren's Egg (grid reference NX 3610 4199) is the name given to a set of late Neolithic or Bronze Age stone monuments in the parish of Glasserton, Wigtownshire, Dumfries and Galloway. The site comprises two pairs of standing stones to the north and south of a large glacial erratic, the Wren's Egg itself. It was one of the first monuments taken into state care after the Ancient Monuments Act passed in 1882.

Historic Environment Scotland notes the site's significance as follows:

Standing stones are a widespread class of monument across Scotland with notable concentrations in the Western and Northern Isles, Caithness, Aberdeenshire, Perthshire and Dumfries and Galloway. However, pairs of stones which appear to have been constructed as an intervisible and discrete group are less common. These standing stones survive within an area that has a concentration of contemporary or near-contemporary sites and as such they have the potential to contribute to our understanding of the development of the landscape.

The pair of stones to the north are in their original settings. They stand oriented east–west, roughly 1.5m apart and 18m from the Wren's Egg. The southern pair are sited 405m from the northern stones, also in an east–west alignment and roughly 1m apart. The standing stones are no taller than 0.6m. The Wren's Egg is not in its original position; it appears a farmer tried and failed to move it from the field.

It was previously thought that the Wren's Egg lay at the centre of two concentric stone circles, but excavations in 1975 showed that this was not the case. In 2012 three cists dating to the Bronze Age were discovered 155m to the northeast of the Wren's Egg. One of these cists contained skeletal remains.

The Wren's Egg and standing stones were scheduled in 1887 by Augustus Pitt Rivers while visiting Sir Herbert Maxwell. In 1890 the monument was one of the first to be taken into state care, after Maxwell offered it into guardianship. It is notable, and 'puzzling', that Pitt Rivers chose to schedule the Wren's Egg and not the nearby Torhouse Stone Circle.
