= Bentpath =

Coordinates: 55°12′N 3°05′W

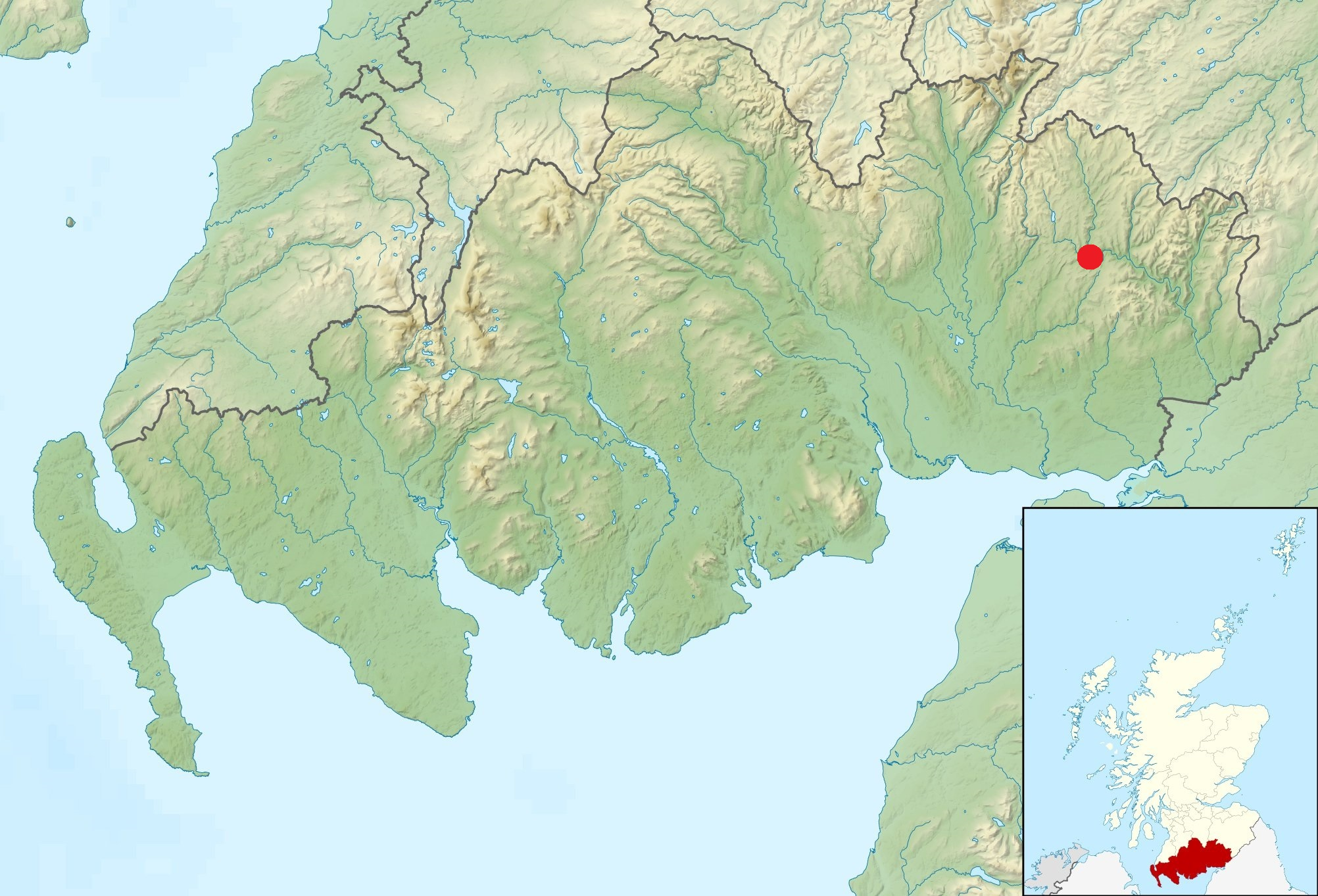
Bentpath within Dumfries and Galloway

Bentpath is a small village between Eskdalemuir and Langholm in Dumfries and Galloway, Scotland. It is located on the River Esk and has a church and a library. Westerkirk library was founded in 1791 and is the oldest library in Scotland which is still in use.
