= List of stone circles in the Scottish Borders =

Locations of well-preserved stone circles in the Scottish Borders.

This is a list of stone circles located in the Scottish Borders council area of Scotland. The Royal Commission on the Ancient and Historical Monuments of Scotland records 16 stone circles in the Scottish Borders. Of these, three are marked as 'possible'. Aubrey Burl's gazetteer lists the same number: 2 in Berwickshire; 2 in Peeblesshire; 10 in Roxburghshire; and 2 in Selkirkshire.

The best preserved sites are the following:

- Borrowston Rig
- Burgh Hill
- Five Stanes
- Harestanes
- Ninestane Rig
- Yadlee

Name	Image	Grid reference Coordinates	Former county Parish	Notes
Borrowston Rig		NT 5576 5231; 55.762151°N 2.70649°W	Berwickshire Lauder	RCAHMS classification: Stone circle
Burgh Hill		NT 4701 0624; 55.347361°N 2.837066°W	Roxburghshire Teviothead	RCAHMS classification: Stone circle
Cloyhouse Burn		NT 1795 3956; 55.64268°N 3.305066°W	Peeblesshire Stobo	RCAHMS classification: Stone circle (possible)
Five Stanes		NT 7526 1686; 55.445025°N 2.392557°W	Roxburghshire Hownam	RCAHMS classification: Stone circle
Five Stone Field		NT 7737 2922; 55.556185°N 2.360216°W	Roxburghshire Linton	RCAHMS classification: Stone circle
Harelaw, Fairnington		NT 66 28; 55.549043°N 2.532515°W	Roxburghshire Roxburgh	RCAHMS classification: Stone circle
Harestanes		NT 1240 4432; 55.684468°N 3.394734°W	Peeblesshire Kirkurd	RCAHMS classification: Stone circle
Harestanes Cottages		NT 64 24; 55.512961°N 2.563698°W	Roxburghshire Ancrum	RCAHMS classification: Stone circle
Kirktonhill		NT 470 543; 55.779557°N 2.845751°W	Berwickshire Channelkirk	RCAHMS classification: Stone circle
Megget Reservoir		NT 17904 21685; 55.482056°N 3.300557°W	Selkirkshire Yarrow	RCAHMS classification: Stone circle
Ninestone Rig		NY 5175 9731; 55.267615°N 2.760791°W	Roxburghshire Castleton	RCAHMS classification: Stone circle
Oxnam Parish		NT 75 16; 55.441758°N 2.38881°W	Roxburghshire Oxnam	RCAHMS classification: Stone circle(s)
Plenderleith		NT 740 118; 55.399901°N 2.411294°W	Roxburghshire Oxnam	RCAHMS classification: Stone circle
Redden		NT 7744 3790; 55.634179°N 2.35982°W	Roxburghshire Sprouston	RCAHMS classification: Four poster stone circle (possible)
Stobo Mill		NT 1755 3700; 55.619617°N 3.310651°W	Peeblesshire Stobo	RCAHMS classification: Stone circle (possible)
Yadlee		NT 6540 6732; 55.897796°N 2.554795°W	Berwickshire Spott	RCAHMS classification: Stone circle

== See also ==
- Stone circles in the British Isles and Brittany
- List of stone circles in Dumfries and Galloway
- List of stone circles
