= Edingham Castle =

Castle in Dumfries and Galloway, Scotland

- Near Dalbeattie, Dumfries and Galloway, Scotland; UK grid reference NX839628
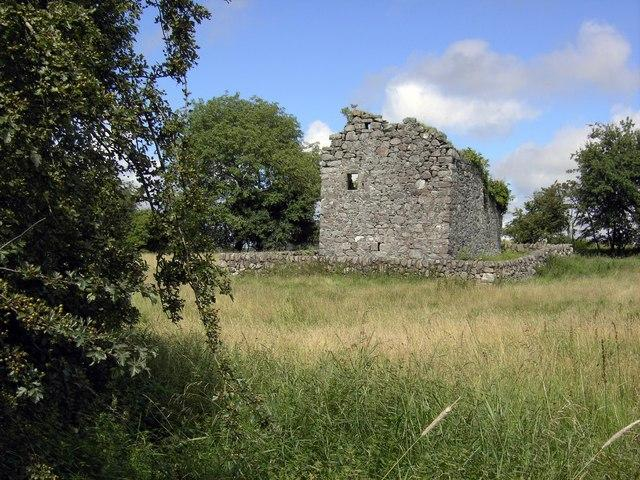
- The castle in 2008

Site information
- Type: Oblong-plan Tower house
- Owner: Private
- Open to the public: Yes
- Condition: Ruined

Location
- Coordinates: 54.946705°N 3.81205°W

Site history
- Built: Late 16th century
- Materials: Stone

Scheduled monument
- Official name: Edingham Castle
- Type: Secular: castle
- Designated: 30 July 1996
- Reference no.: SM6412

Edingham Castle is a late 16th-century tower house situated near Dalbeattie, Dumfries and Galloway. It is the remains of an early tower house built for the Livingstones of Little Airds. It is near Edingham Munitions Factory and is a scheduled monument.

Edingham Castle was built as a four-story tower in 1570-1585 by the Morrisons. They were succeeded by the Afflecks in 1660. Later, in the 1700s this became the McVicar-Afflecks. It was roofless by 1872 when it was purchased by John Hutinson. The remains measure 8.6 meters x 7.2 meters.

== See also ==
- Scheduled monuments in Dumfries and Galloway
- List of Category A listed buildings in Dumfries and Galloway
