= Boreland =

Coordinates: 55°12′N 3°19′W

Boreland is a village in Dumfries and Galloway, Scotland, which is located in Dryfesdale about 7 miles (11 kilometres) north of Lockerbie on the B723 road to Eskdalemuir. The village is bordered by the Dryfe Water to the north, whilst the Boreland Burn flows to the south of the village which is a tributary of the Dryfe Water. Next to the Dryfe are the remains of Gillesbie Tower which was home to one of the Border Reiver clans, the Grahams. This tower, dating back to the 15th century, was a stronghold of the Grahams of Gillesbie. The area surrounding Boreland has many other significant historical remains, with some dating back to the Iron Age.

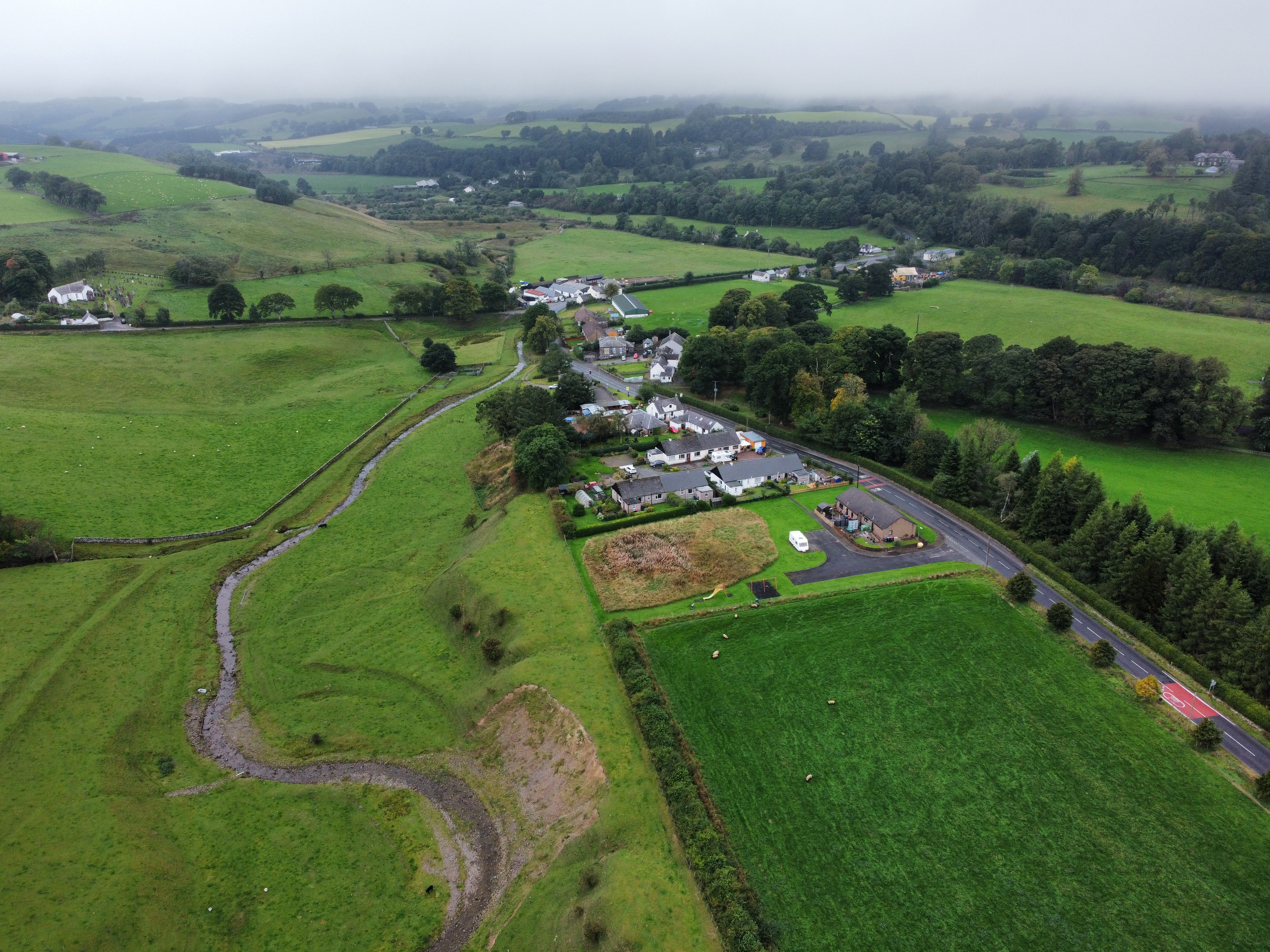
An aerial photograph of Boreland looking west.

Boreland had a small church on the hill overlooking the village called Hutton and Corrie Parish Church, it served the village and surrounding areas for many years. It was built in 1710 and has an extensive graveyard, with some remaining gravestones dating back to the 1700's. The building still stands, however this is now closed for worship.

The village also had a small school called Hutton Primary School. The school was built in 1897 but was mothballed by Dumfries and Galloway Council in 2021.

Boreland is home to a small guest house called Nether Boreland, which is also the home to an equestrian centre. This was formally a farm going by the same name, and prior to that was a coach house and village inn in the early 1800's that went by the name of The Anchor Inn, after the mid 19th century it was known as The Boreland Inn.

There is another small village in Scotland with the same name, near Dysart in Fife. The name Boreland is taken from the Old Scots or Old Norse "bordland" meaning "table-land" or "land which directly supplies the laird’s table".
