= Bargrennan chambered cairn =

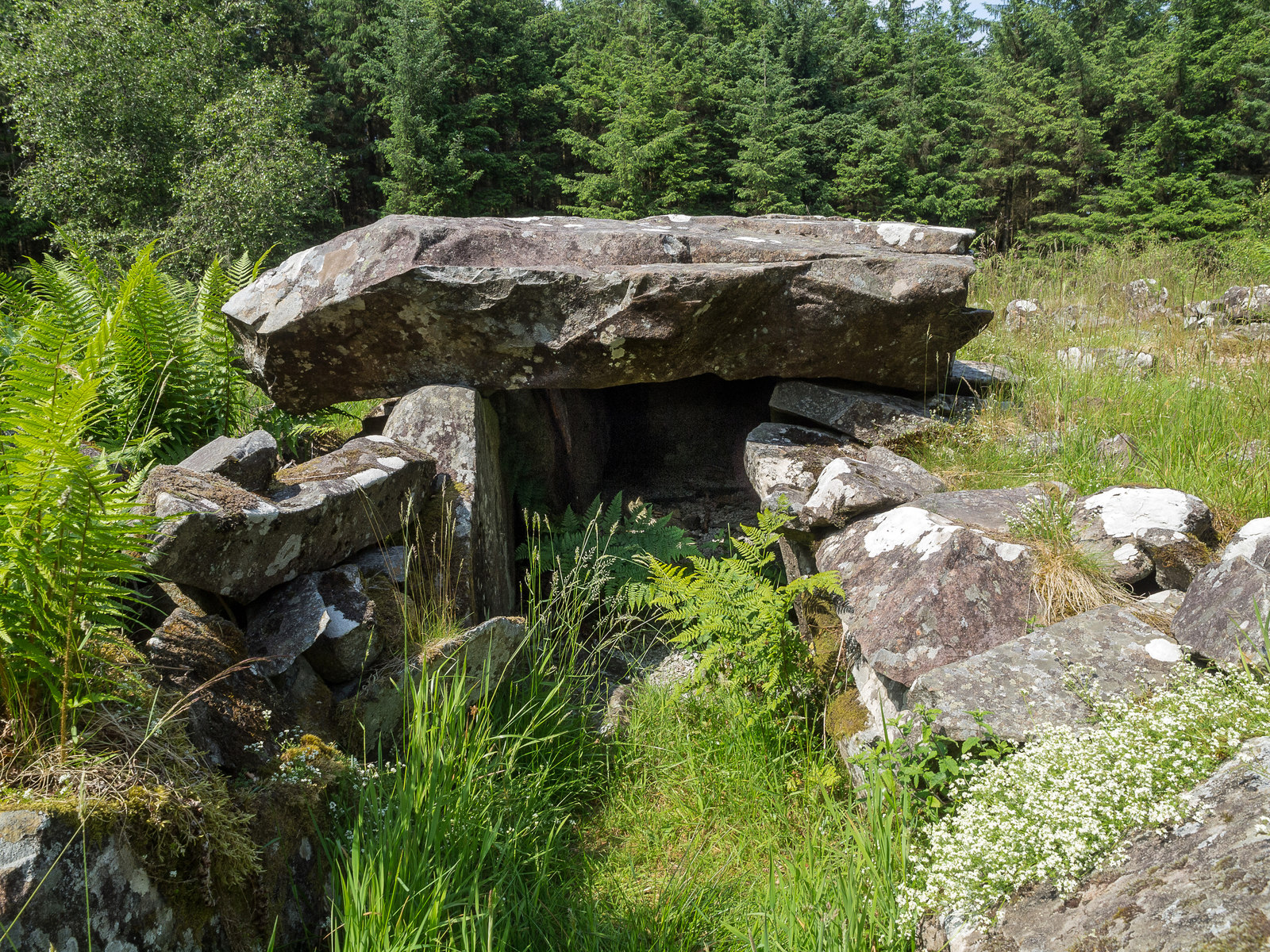
White Cairn, Bargrennan

Bargrennan chambered cairns are a class of prehistoric chambered cairns found only in south-west Scotland, in western Dumfries and Galloway and southern Ayrshire. They form a separate group from the Clyde cairns which are found along the coast of western Britain. Unlike Clyde cairns, Bargrennan monuments are passage graves, with one or more chambers set into a round cairn. As well as being structurally different, Bargrennan cairns are separated from Clyde cairns by their siting and distribution; they are found in upland, inland areas of Galloway and Ayrshire. Murray suggests that there are around twelve Bargrennan monuments in south-west Scotland. She also notes that as sheep rees are often built into and over these types of cairns, more are likely to have been lost under shepherd's buildings.

The type site is White Cairn, Bargrennan. This monument and nearby Cairnderry chambered cairn have been excavated but having been previously robbed out neither have provided material for dating. Both sites show extensive reuse in the Bronze Age, including the addition of a Bronze Age cist in White Cairn. It has been suggested that this may indicate an early Bronze Age date for sites of this type. However, a mid to late Neolthic date has also been suggested.
