= Bargrennan =

Coordinates: 55°03′N 4°35′W

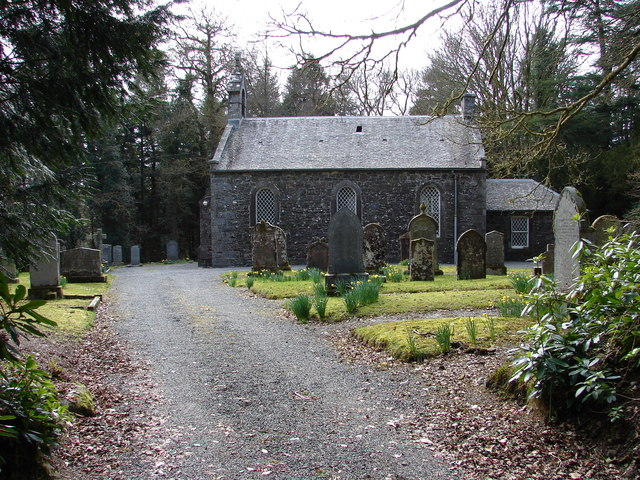
Bargrennan church

Bargrennan (Scottish Gaelic: Bar Grianain, meaning height of the summer house or sunny spot) is a village in Dumfries and Galloway, in the south west of Scotland. It is located 9 miles northwest of Newton Stewart by the River Cree and on the A714 road to Girvan. The Southern Upland Way runs through the village and the Glentrool Forest, managed by the Forestry Commission, is to the north-east of the village.

White Cairn, Bargrennan gives its name to the class of prehistoric monuments known as Bargrennan chambered cairns.

== See also ==
- List of places in Dumfries and Galloway
- List of places in Scotland
