= Kirkton, Dumfries and Galloway =

Coordinates: 55.116°N 3.608°W

- Country: Scotland
- Sovereign state: United Kingdom
- Police: Scotland
- Fire: Scottish
- Ambulance: Scottish

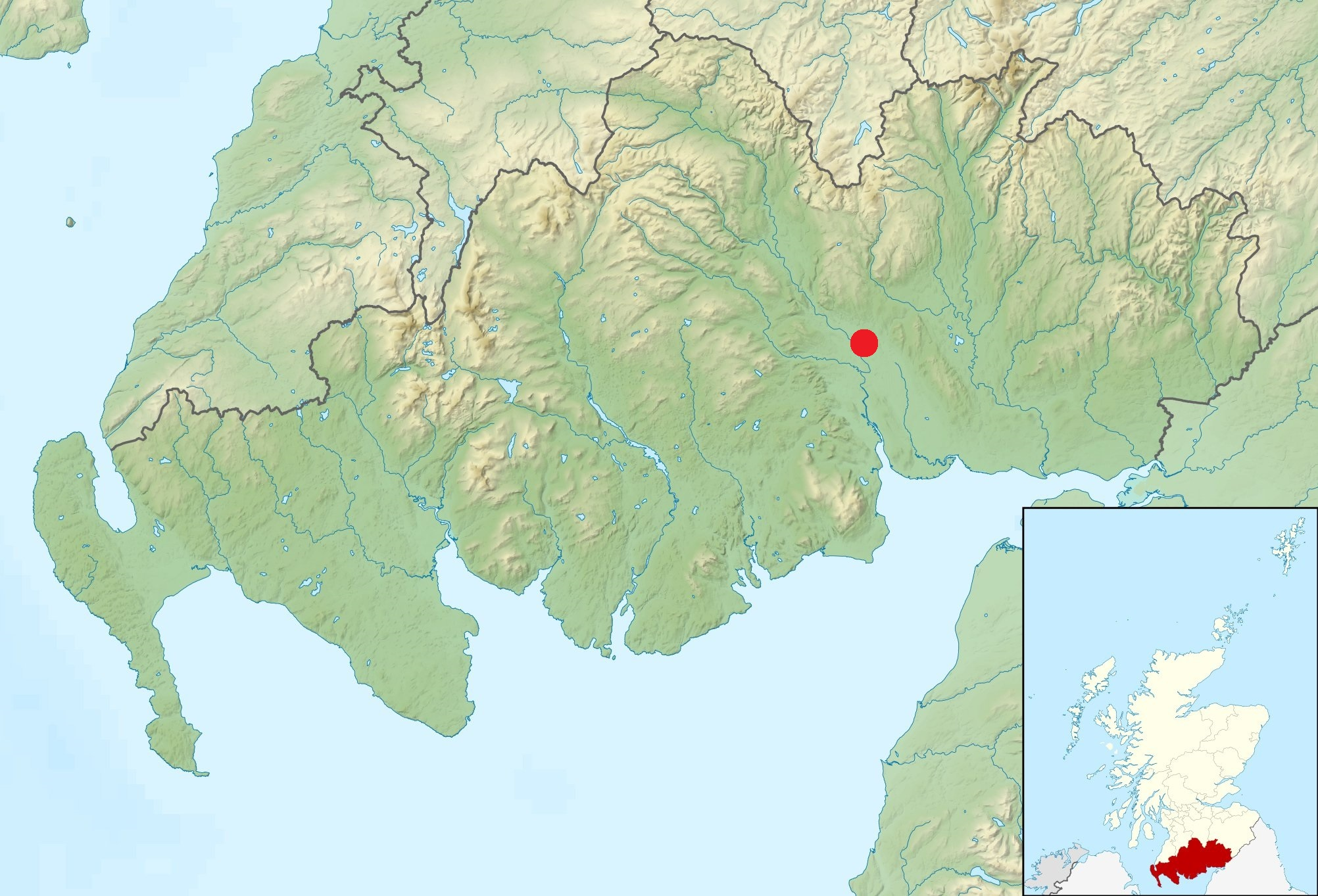
Kirkton within Dumfries and Galloway

Kirkton is a small village between Duncow and Dumfries in Dumfries and Galloway, Scotland. It is located near the River Nith and has a Grade B listed church.

The church serves the combined Kirkmahoe parish. The parish covers a population of 2.800 including part of the urban village of Locharbriggs together with the rural villages of Dalswinton, Duncow and Kirkton.
