= High Banks cup and ring markings =

Series of Neolithic or Bronze Age carvings in Dumfries and Galloway, Scotland

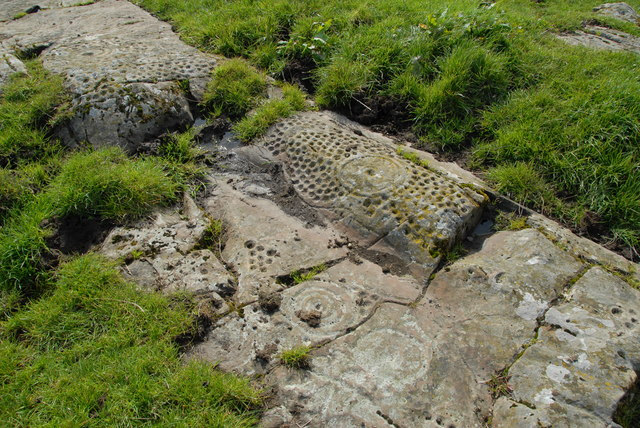

- Location within Dumfries and Galloway
- 54.818811°N 4.010475°W
- OS grid reference: NX 70917 48960

Scheduled monument
- Designated: 21/08/1928
- Reference no.: SM1028

The High Banks cup and ring markings are a series of Neolithic or Bronze Age carvings on an outcrop of rock near High Banks farm, 3 km SE of Kirkcudbright, Dumfries and Galloway. They are one of the best collections of cup and ring markings in Galloway.
