= Girdle Stanes =

The Girdle Stanes
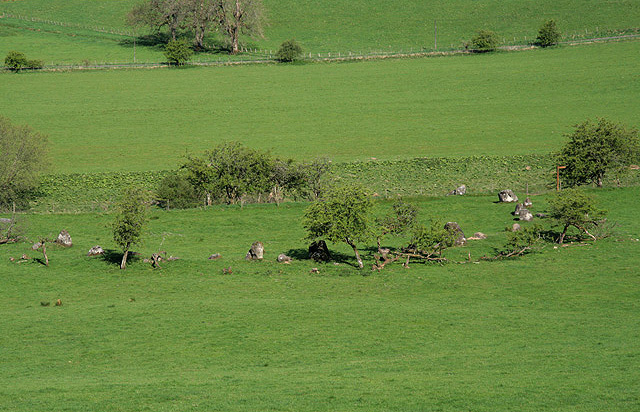
- Girdle Stanes in 2008
- Type: Stone circle
- Coordinates: 55.253879°N 3.17593°W

Scheduled monument
- Official name: Girdlestanes, stone circle
- Type: Prehistoric ritual and funerary: stone circle or ring
- Designated: 1 April 1924
- Reference no.: SM634

The Girdle Stanes (grid reference NY 25351 96153) is a stone circle near Eskdalemuir, Dumfries and Galloway. The western portion of the circle has been washed away by the White Esk, leaving 26 of an original 40 to 45 stones in a crescent. Unlike the majority of such sites in Dumfriesshire, the Girdle Stanes forms a true circle rather than an oval. When complete, its diameter would have been 39m.

Its situation, shape and construction link it to the Cumbrian circles to the south. In particular, it has a number of similarities with the Swinside circle in the south-west of the Lake District. Like Swinside, the tallest stones are positioned at the north of the circle, and there is an apparent entrance in the south-east. Both circles have a solar alignment. However, while Swinside is aligned to the midwinter sunrise, the Girdle Stanes is aligned to the sun's southernmost rising at the beginning of November, which correlates with the festival of Samhain.

A line of stones leads north to the Loupin Stanes; it is possible that this is the remains of an avenue linking the two circles.

== See also ==
- Stone circles in the British Isles and Brittany
- List of stone circles
