= DG postcode area =

Postcode area within the United Kingdom

Dumfries
- Postcode area
- Coordinates: 55.022°N 3.887°W
- Country: United Kingdom
- Postcode area: DG
- Postcode area name: Dumfries
- Post towns: 14
- Postcode districts: 15
- Postcode sectors: 41
- Postcodes (live): 6,842
- Postcodes (total): 7,727
- Statistics as at May 2020

The DG postcode area, also known as the Dumfries and Galloway postcode area, is a group of fifteen postcode districts in south-west Scotland, within fourteen post towns. These cover most of Dumfries and Galloway, including Dumfries, Annan, Canonbie, Castle Douglas, Dalbeattie, Gretna, Kirkcudbright, Langholm, Lockerbie, Moffat, Newton Stewart, Sanquhar, Stranraer and Thornhill. The DG16 district also extends across the border into Cumbria, England.

Mail for the DG postcode area is processed at Carlisle Mail Centre, along with mail for the CA postcode area.

== Coverage ==
The approximate coverage of the postcode districts:

Postcode district	Post town	Coverage	Local authority area(s)
DG1	DUMFRIES	Ae, Locharbriggs, Carrutherstown	Dumfries and Galloway
DG2	DUMFRIES	New Abbey	Dumfries and Galloway
DG3	THORNHILL	Moniaive	Dumfries and Galloway
DG4	SANQUHAR	Sanquhar, Kirkconnel, Kelloholm, Mennock	Dumfries and Galloway
DG5	DALBEATTIE	Dalbeattie	Dumfries and Galloway
DG6	KIRKCUDBRIGHT	Kirkcudbright, Twynholm, Borgue, Dundrennan	Dumfries and Galloway
DG7	CASTLE DOUGLAS	Castle Douglas, Gatehouse of Fleet, New Galloway	Dumfries and Galloway
DG8	NEWTON STEWART	Newton Stewart, Wigtown, Port William, Glenluce, New Luce	Dumfries and Galloway, South Ayrshire
DG9	STRANRAER	Stranraer, Castle Kennedy, Portpatrick, Sandhead	Dumfries and Galloway
DG10	MOFFAT	Moffat, Beattock, Newton Wamphray	Dumfries and Galloway
DG11	LOCKERBIE	Lockerbie, Johnstonebridge, Boreland, Ecclefechan, Kirtlebridge, Kirkpatrick-Fleming	Dumfries and Galloway
DG12	ANNAN	Annan, Cummertrees, Brydekirk, Eastriggs	Dumfries and Galloway
DG13	LANGHOLM	Langholm, Bentpath, Eskdalemuir, Arkleton	Dumfries and Galloway
DG14	CANONBIE	Canonbie	Dumfries and Galloway
DG16	GRETNA	Gretna, Gretna Green	Dumfries and Galloway, Cumberland

== Map ==
DG postcode area map, showing postcode districts in red and post towns in grey text, with links to nearby CA, KA, ML and TD postcode areas.

== See also ==
- List of postcode areas in the United Kingdom
- Postcode Address File
