= Loupin Stanes =

Stone circle in Scotland

The Loupin Stanes
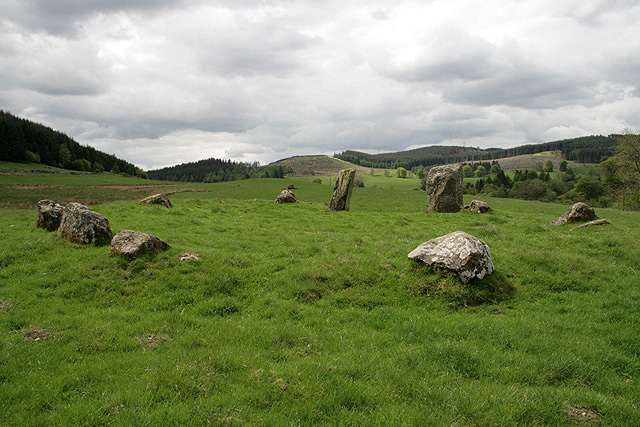
- Loupin' Stanes stone circle in 2008
- Interactive map of The Loupin Stanes
- 55.258263°N 3.170489°W
- Type: Stone circle

Scheduled monument
- Official name: Loupin' Stanes stone circle
- Type: Prehistoric ritual and funerary: stone circle or ring
- Designated: 1 April 1924
- Reference no.: SM637

The Loupin Stanes (grid reference NY25709663) is a stone circle near Eskdalemuir, Dumfries and Galloway, Scotland.

== Description ==
Oval in shape, the site consists of twelve stones set on an artificial platform. At the west-southwest portion of the circle are two large pillars, which are typical of the 'entrance circles' of south-west Scotland.

The circle takes its name from the tradition of leaping between the tops of these two stones.

== Nearby sites ==
There were two other circles nearby, which are now ruined and almost imperceptible. A line of stones leads south to the Girdle Stanes; it is possible that this is the remains of an avenue linking the two circles.

== See also ==
- Stone circles in the British Isles and Brittany
- List of stone circles
