= Easthill stone circle =

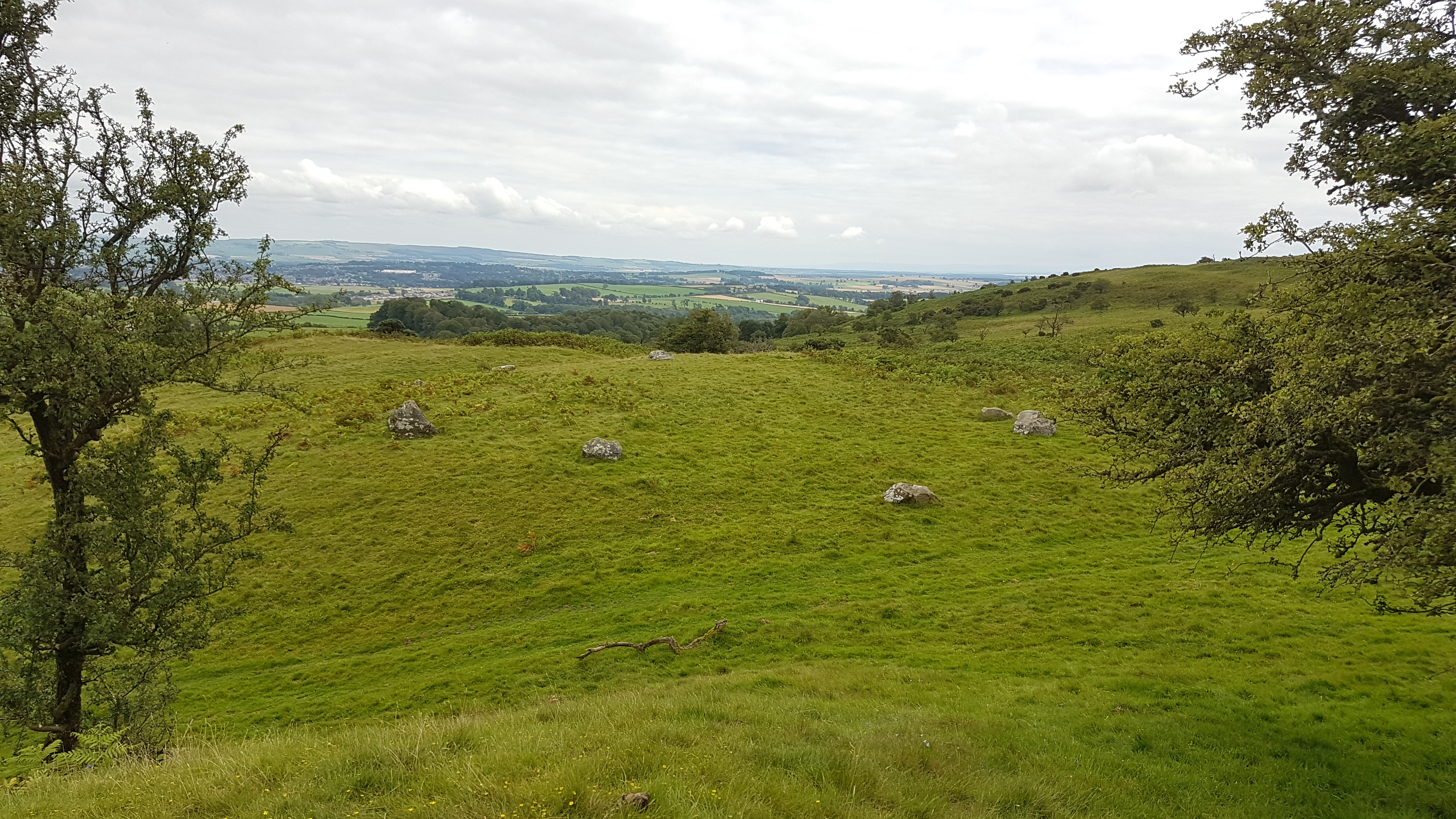
- Interactive map of Easthill stone circle
- Coordinates: 55.047673°N 3.692922°W

Scheduled monument
- Official name: East Hill Farmhouse, stone circle
- Type: Prehistoric ritual and funerary: stone circle or ring
- Designated: 31 August 1928
- Reference no.: SM1022

Easthill stone circle (grid reference NX91937388), also known as the Seven Grey Stanes, is a small oval stone circle 3¾ miles south-west of Dumfries. Eight stones of a probable nine remain. Despite being considerably smaller, the shape and orientation of the circle link it to the nearby Twelve Apostles and the other large ovals of Dumfriesshire. It is a scheduled monument.

== See also ==
- Stone circles in the British Isles and Brittany
- List of stone circles
