= Cairnderry chambered cairn =

Pre-historic burial site in Scotland

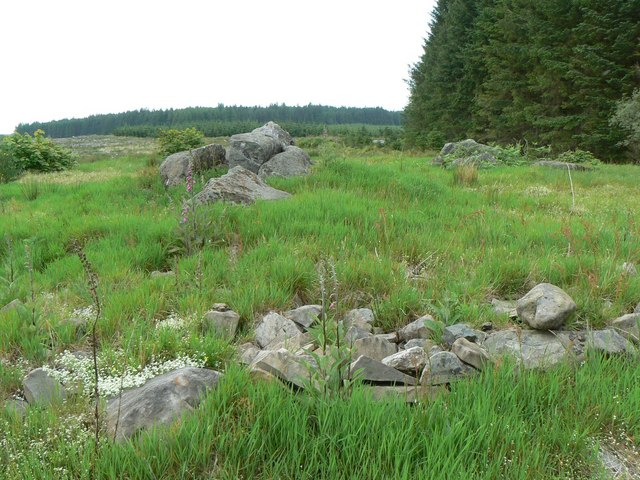

- Location within Dumfries and Galloway
- 55.085237°N 4.640045°W
- OS grid reference: NX 31592 79940

Scheduled monument
- Designated: 06/02/1928
- Reference no.: SM1007

Cairnderry chambered cairn is a chambered cairn in Dumfries and Galloway. It is a Bargrennan cairn, a type of Neolithic or early Bronze Age monument only found in south west Scotland.
