= Torhouse =

Torhouse Stone Circle
- Torhousekie
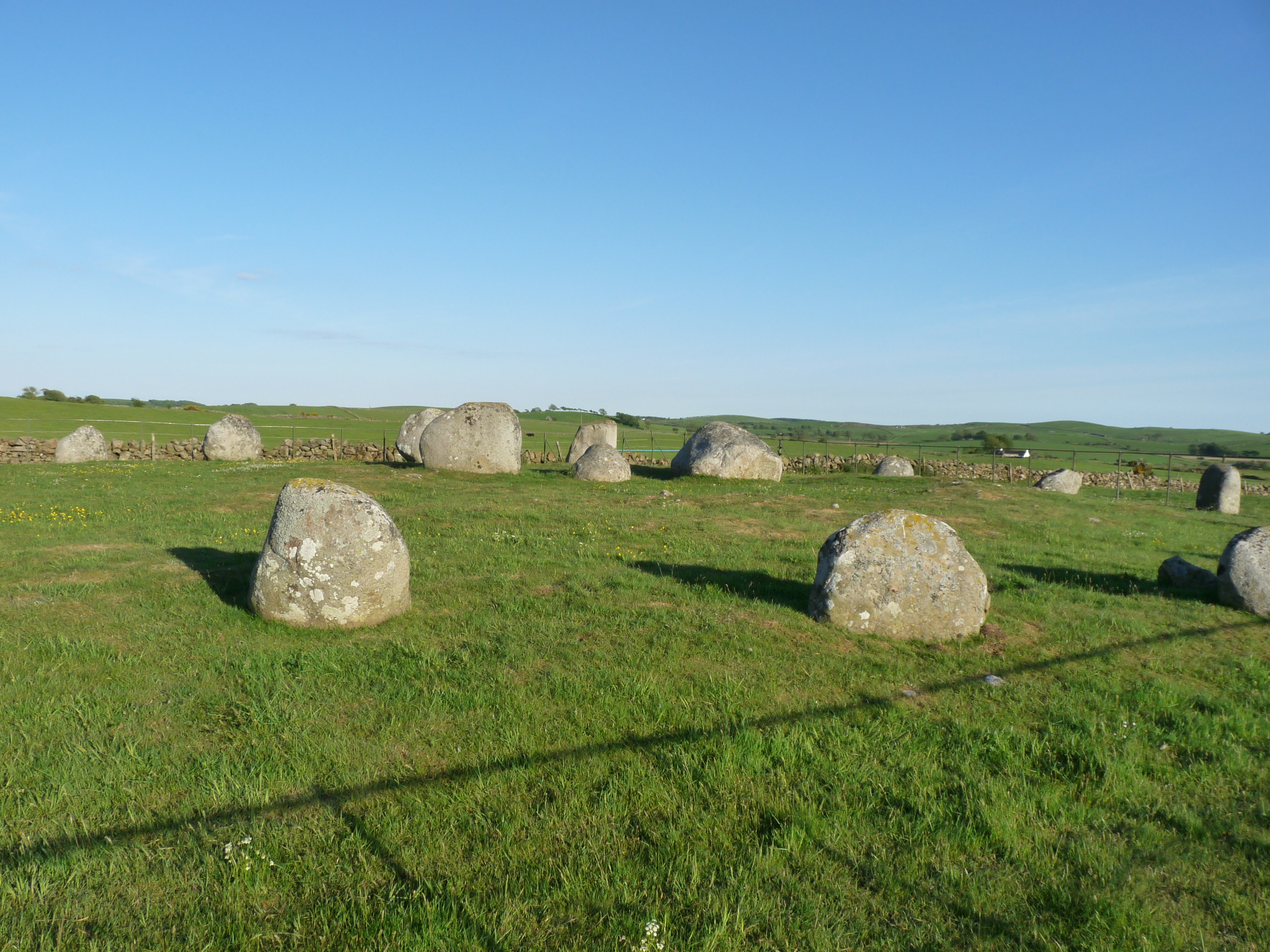
- Torhousekie stone circle
- Interactive map of Torhouse Stone Circle
- 54.877472°N 4.522639°W
- Type: Stone circle
- Periods: Neolithic / Bronze Age
- Location: Galloway

Site notes
- Owner: Historic Environment Scotland
- Public access: Yes

Scheduled monument
- Official name: Torhouse Stone Circle
- Type: Prehistoric ritual and funerary: stone circle or ring
- Designated: 24 October 1924
- Reference no.: SM90304

The Standing Stones of Torhouse (also Torhousekie) are a stone circle of nineteen granite boulders on the land of Torhouse, three miles west of Wigtown, Scotland.

== Description ==
The stone circle consists of nineteen granite boulders set on a slightly raised platform. The stones have a height ranging from about 0.6 metres to 1.5 metres and are arranged in a circle with a diameter of about 22 metres. The larger stones, over 1 metre high, are on the southeast side.

Three upright boulders stand in a line near the centre of the circle. The direction of the line of the three central stones is northeast to southwest.

Two stones stand 40 metres to the south-southeast of the stone circle, one large and the other small, and there is a stone row of three stones 130 metres to the east. There are also surviving remains of several burial cairns, and history records others long removed to build field dykes.

The stone circle has not yet been archaeologically excavated. It probably dates to the Neolithic period or the Bronze Age. The Torhouse Stones are in the care of Historic Environment Scotland as a scheduled monument.

== In folklore ==
Local tradition maintains that the three large stones in the center of the circle contained the tomb of Galdus, a mythical Scottish king. A similar story is told about one of the tombs at Cairnholy, also in Galloway.

In the dyke on the south side of the road is a stone with a deep cavity which according to tradition, "the knowing never pass without depositing therein some pebble or gift to pass in peace".

== Gallery ==
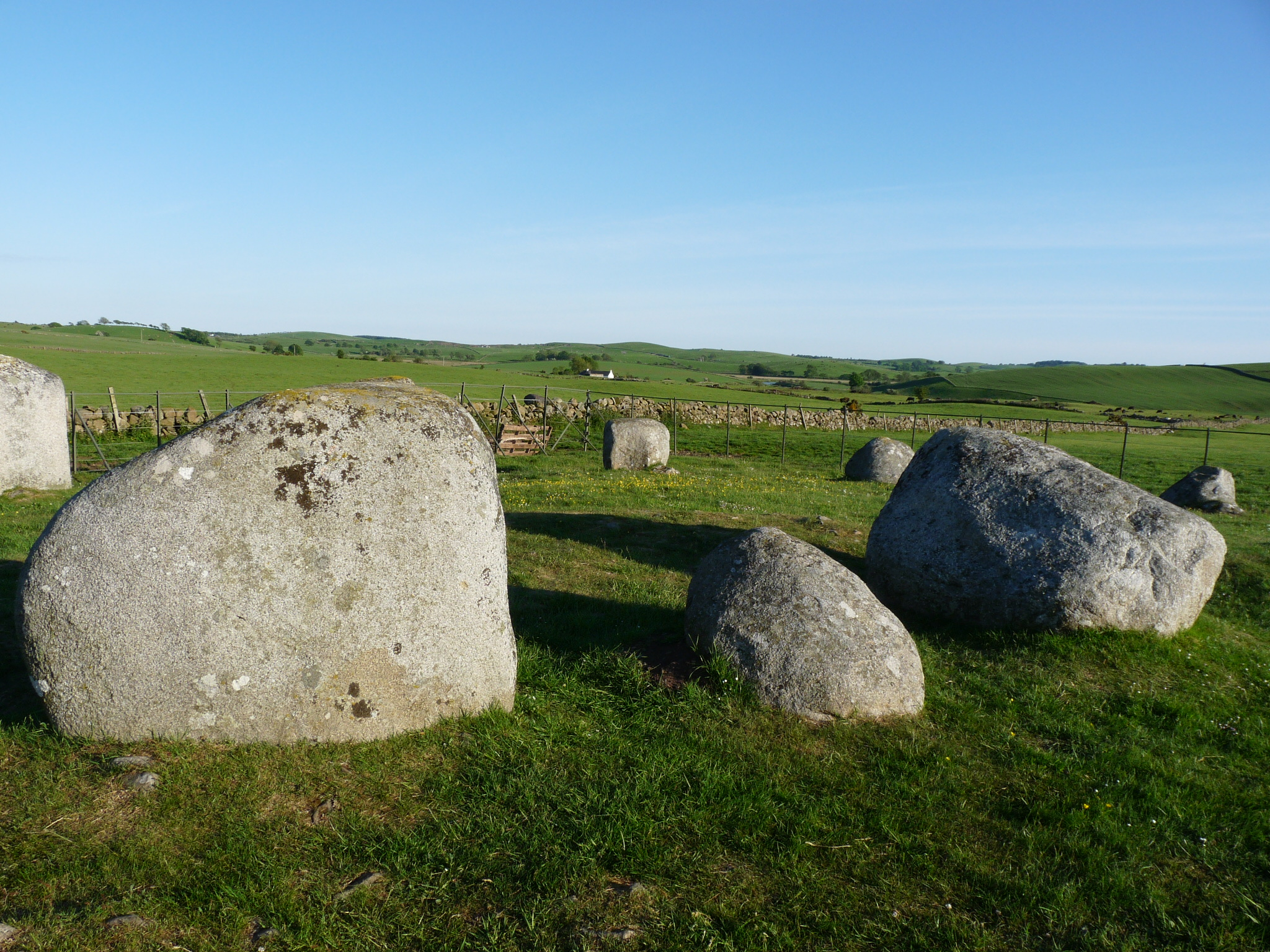
Central setting of three stones

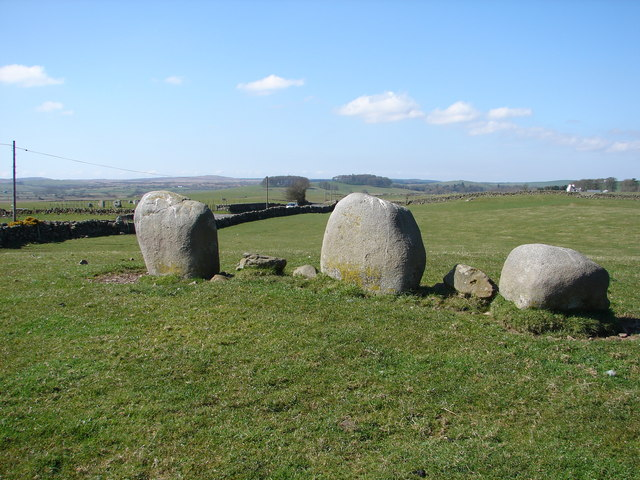
Torhousekie Stone Row, 130 metres east of the stone circle
