= Eskdalemuir =

Coordinates: 55.269°N 3.177°W

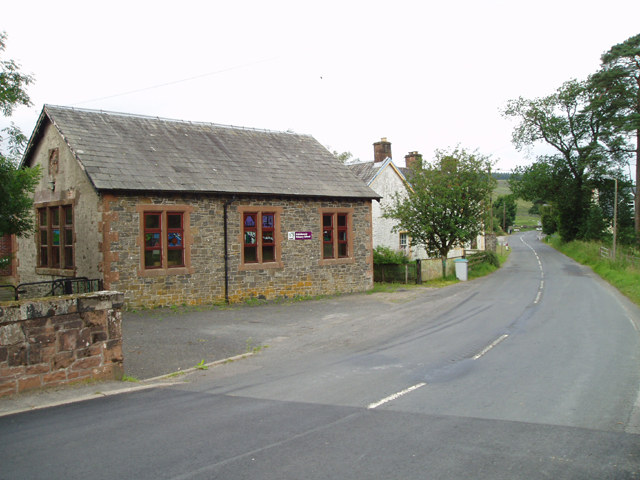
- The former primary school, now "The Hub".

- Location within Dumfries and Galloway
- Population: 265 (2001)
- Civil parish: Eskdalemuir
- Council area: Dumfries and Galloway
- Lieutenancy area: Dumfries
- Country: Scotland
- Sovereign state: United Kingdom
- Post town: Langholm
- Postcode district: DG13
- Dialling code: 013873
- Police: Scotland
- Fire: Scottish
- Ambulance: Scottish
- UK Parliament: Dumfriesshire, Clydesdale and Tweeddale
- Scottish Parliament: Dumfriesshire

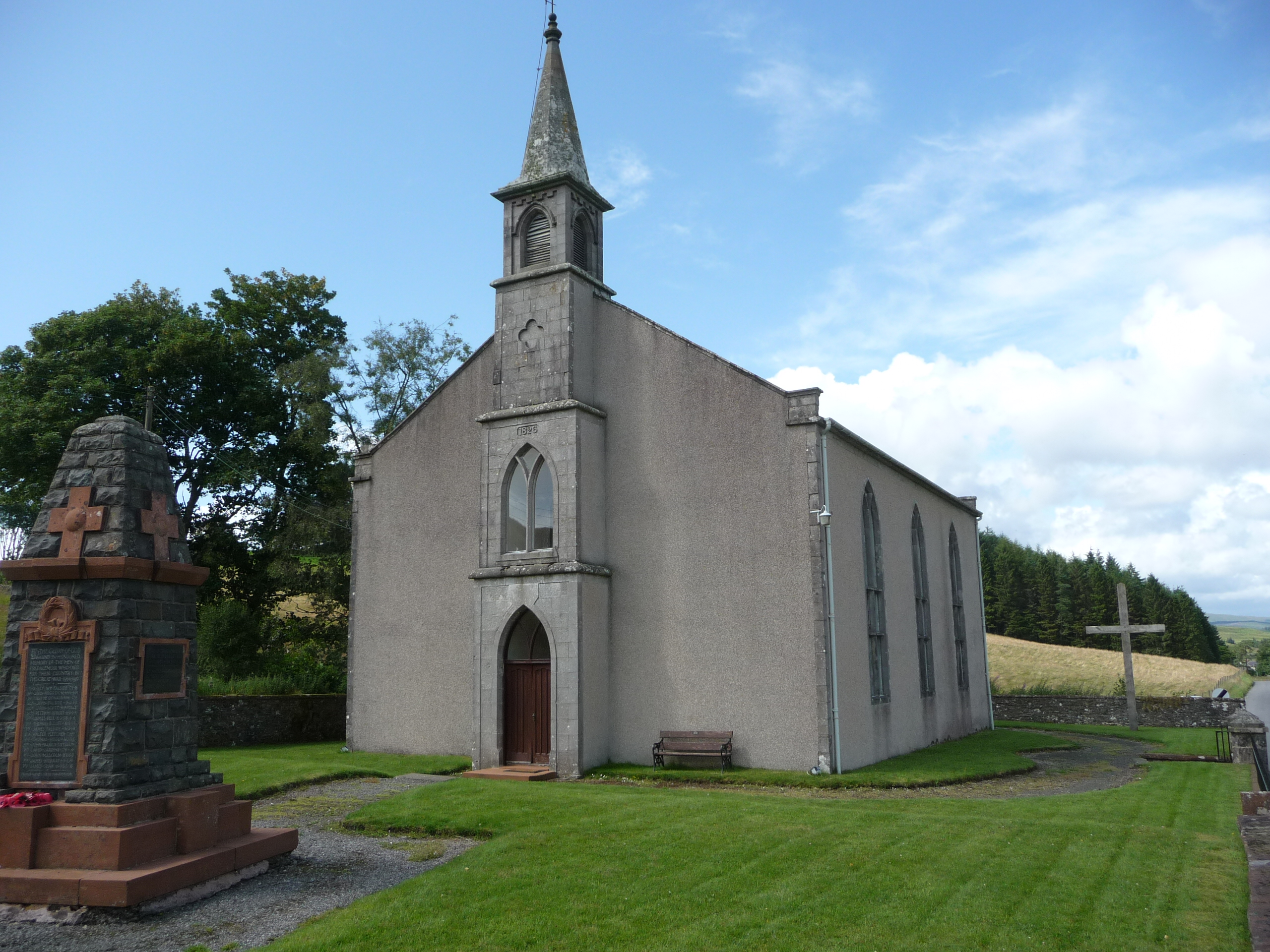
Eskdalemuir parish church

Eskdalemuir is a civil parish and small village in Dumfries and Galloway, Scotland, with a population of 265. It is around 10 miles (16 km) north-west of Langholm and 10 miles (16 km) north-east of Lockerbie.

The area comprises high wet moorlands, chiefly used for sheep grazing and forestry plantation (Eskdalemuir Forest). The main settlement is near the White Esk river.

Eskdalemuir is probably best known for the Eskdalemuir Observatory and for the Samye Ling Tibetan Buddhist monastery.

== Samye Ling Tibetan Buddhist monastery ==
In the community is the Samye Ling Tibetan Buddhist monastery, which incorporates a former hunting lodge called Johnstone House. Listed as a tourist attraction by VisitScotland.

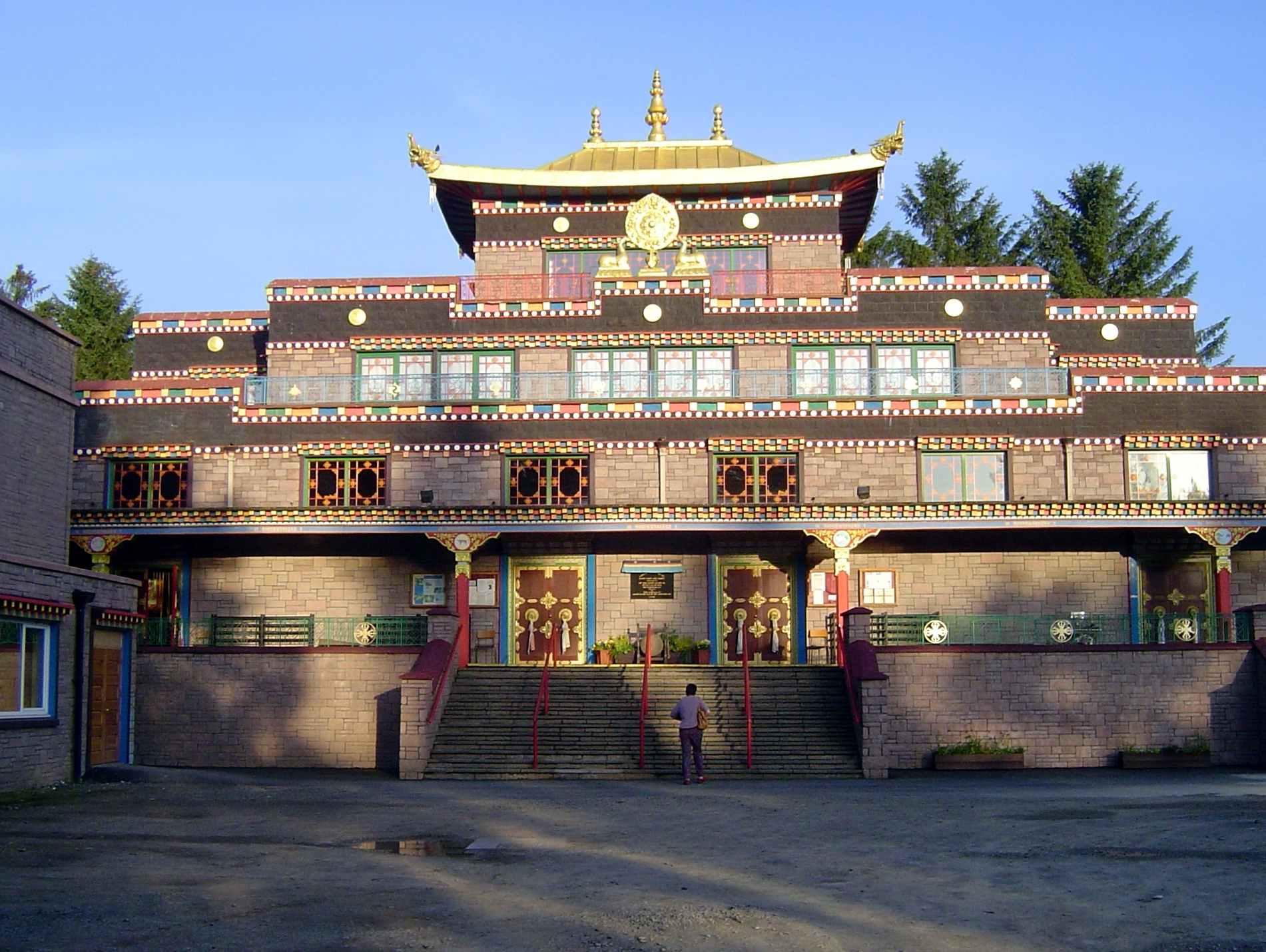
Samye Ling Tibetan Buddhist monastery

== Archaeology ==
Eskdalemuir is rich in archaeological remains, including two neolithic stone circles, the Loupin Stanes and the Girdle Stanes, and bank barrow, Castle O'er, a possible ritual centre for the Selgovae, Raeburnfoot, a Roman fort and later dark age fortifications and settlements.

== Climate ==
Due to the establishment of the Eskdalemuir Observatory here in 1908, Eskdalemuir has one of the longest climatological records in the UK, with data stretching back over 100 years. The data shows Eskdalemuir to be a very wet, often cloudy place.

Eskdalemuir holds the UK weather record for the highest rainfall in a 30-minute period: 80 mm (3.1 in), recorded on 26 June 1953. It also holds the record for the dullest summer month; 43.9 hours of sunshine were recorded in August 1912, and subsequently just 41 hours were measured in August 2008. However, these values are not directly comparable due to a change in recording technique – the earlier having been made using a Campbell–Stokes recorder and the later using an electronic recorder.

Other recent low sunshine records for the site include 30 hours during October 2011, 46 hours during September 2008, and 69 hours during July 2010. Its dullest month was December 2015 with only 9.2 hours sunshine recorded. Eskdalemuir experienced its wettest year on record in 2011.

In spite of it being located inland, the dull and wet nature of the climate due to the elevation leads to chilly summers that are colder than more northerly locations such as Glasgow and Edinburgh. The inland nature of the climate is more manifest during winter months; frosts are common, and the average lows between December and February are below the freezing point.

The highest recorded temperature was 32.3 °C (90.1 °F) in July 2022 and the lowest is −19.0 °C (−2.2 °F) in January 2010.

Eskdalemuir holds the record for the coldest April temperature ever recorded in the UK, a low of −15.4 °C (4.3 °F) on 2 April 1917.

Climate data for Eskdalemuir (242 m AMSL; averages 1991–2020, extremes 1909–present)
Month	Jan	Feb	Mar	Apr	May	Jun	Jul	Aug	Sep	Oct	Nov	Dec	Year
Record high °C (°F)	12.2 (54.0)	15.7 (60.3)	20.1 (68.2)	23.8 (74.8)	26.8 (80.2)	29.9 (85.8)	32.3 (90.1)	28.7 (83.7)	27.1 (80.8)	22.2 (72.0)	17.4 (63.3)	13.4 (56.1)	32.3 (90.1)
Mean daily maximum °C (°F)	5.2 (41.4)	5.9 (42.6)	7.8 (46.0)	10.8 (51.4)	14.1 (57.4)	16.4 (61.5)	18.2 (64.8)	17.7 (63.9)	15.3 (59.5)	11.7 (53.1)	8.0 (46.4)	5.5 (41.9)	11.4 (52.5)
Daily mean °C (°F)	2.5 (36.5)	2.9 (37.2)	4.3 (39.7)	6.6 (43.9)	9.5 (49.1)	12.1 (53.8)	13.9 (57.0)	13.6 (56.5)	11.4 (52.5)	8.2 (46.8)	5.0 (41.0)	2.7 (36.9)	7.7 (45.9)
Mean daily minimum °C (°F)	−0.1 (31.8)	−0.2 (31.6)	0.8 (33.4)	2.4 (36.3)	4.8 (40.6)	7.9 (46.2)	9.6 (49.3)	9.5 (49.1)	7.5 (45.5)	4.7 (40.5)	2.0 (35.6)	−0.2 (31.6)	4.1 (39.3)
Record low °C (°F)	−19.0 (−2.2)	−16.6 (2.1)	−14.7 (5.5)	−15.4 (4.3)	−7.1 (19.2)	−2.5 (27.5)	−1.7 (28.9)	−2.2 (28.0)	−5.0 (23.0)	−7.8 (18.0)	−14.4 (6.1)	−18.5 (−1.3)	−19.0 (−2.2)
Average precipitation mm (inches)	208.3 (8.20)	170.0 (6.69)	146.7 (5.78)	102.1 (4.02)	102.9 (4.05)	111.2 (4.38)	130.0 (5.12)	143.9 (5.67)	132.1 (5.20)	184.5 (7.26)	189.9 (7.48)	205.7 (8.10)	1,827.2 (71.94)
Average precipitation days (≥ 1.0 mm)	19.1	16.3	15.7	13.7	13.1	13.7	15.5	16.4	15.1	18.0	18.6	18.5	193.5
Mean monthly sunshine hours	37.7	60.6	87.1	133.3	168.6	138.5	137.7	128.1	101.1	72.6	49.0	37.4	1,151.6
Source 1: Met Office
Source 2: Starlings Roost Weather
