= Twelve Apostles Stone Circle =

Stone circle in Dumfries and Galloway, Scotland

The Twelve Apostles
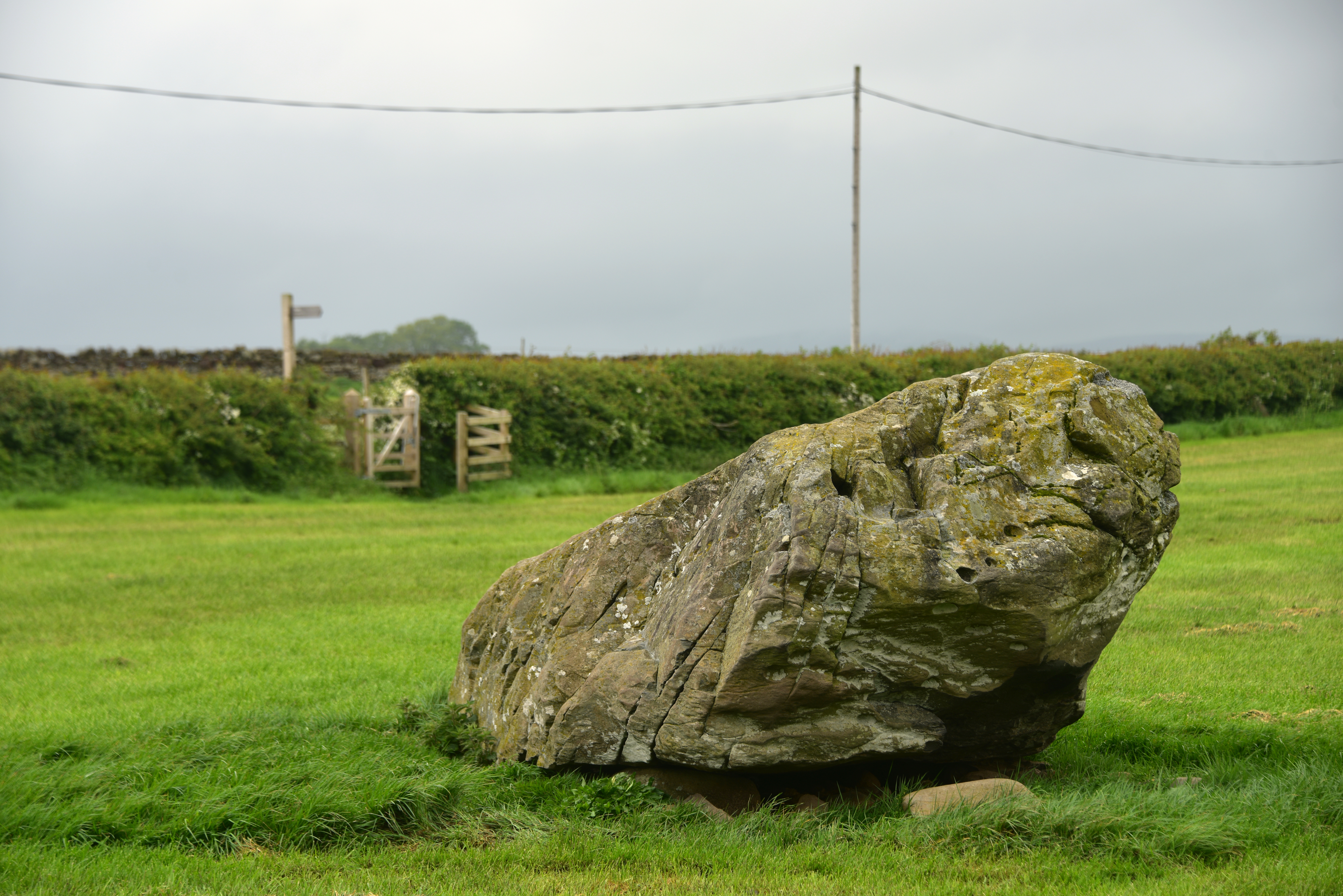
- The largest of the stones
- Interactive map of The Twelve Apostles
- 55.097804°N 3.651705°W
- Type: Stone circle

Scheduled monument
- Official name: Twelve Apostles stone circle
- Type: Prehistoric ritual and funerary: stone circle or ring
- Designated: 1 April 1924
- Reference no.: SM641

The Twelve Apostles (grid reference NX9470079400) is a large stone circle located between the villages of Holywood and Newbridge, near Dumfries, Scotland. It is the seventh largest stone circle in Britain and the largest on the mainland of Scotland. It is similar in design to the stone circles of Cumbria, and is considered to be an outlier of this group. Its south-westerly arrangement aligns it with the midwinter sunset.

It is a scheduled monument.

== Description ==
The circle is composed of eleven stones, of which five are earthfast; however, there were originally twelve. A plan taken by Francis Grose in 1789 shows twelve stones and the First Statistical Account, published two years later, records the same number. One of the stones was removed before 1837, when the New Statistical Account entry for Holywood was compiled. The 25 inch Ordnance Survey map of 1850 shows twelve stones in the circle, but this is due to an accidental spot of blue ink on the original plan which was carried on to published work.

Local traditions recorded in the nineteenth century associate the stones with the twelve apostles of Jesus Christ, and link the removed twelfth stone with Judas Iscariot. W. C. Lukis notes that in one tradition the stones were said to be set up by the apostles.

The tallest upright stone is around 1.9 m (6 ft 3 in) tall. The longest, lying in the south-western sector, is 3.2 m (10 ft) long. The circle measures 89 m (292 ft) at its maximum diameter. It is not a true circle in formation; rather, it is an example of Alexander Thom's Type B 'flattened circle'.

All but one of the stones are Silurian rock; the other being Porphyry. Four, including the Porphyry rock, are natural boulders; the rest have been quarried. The nearest occurrence of Silurian rock is two miles away, near Irongray Church.

The Easthill stone circle is 3¾ miles SSW west of the Twelve Apostles. There was another stone circle a mile east near the River Nith but this was destroyed and used for building material before the New Statistical Account was compiled. Nearby are two cursuses, one of which, if extended, would run towards the circle.

In 1882 it was reported that a four inch bronze figure was uncovered at the circle some years before. This has since been identified as Saint Norbert, founder of the Premonstratensian order and dated to the twelfth century. It is now housed in the Dumfries Museum.

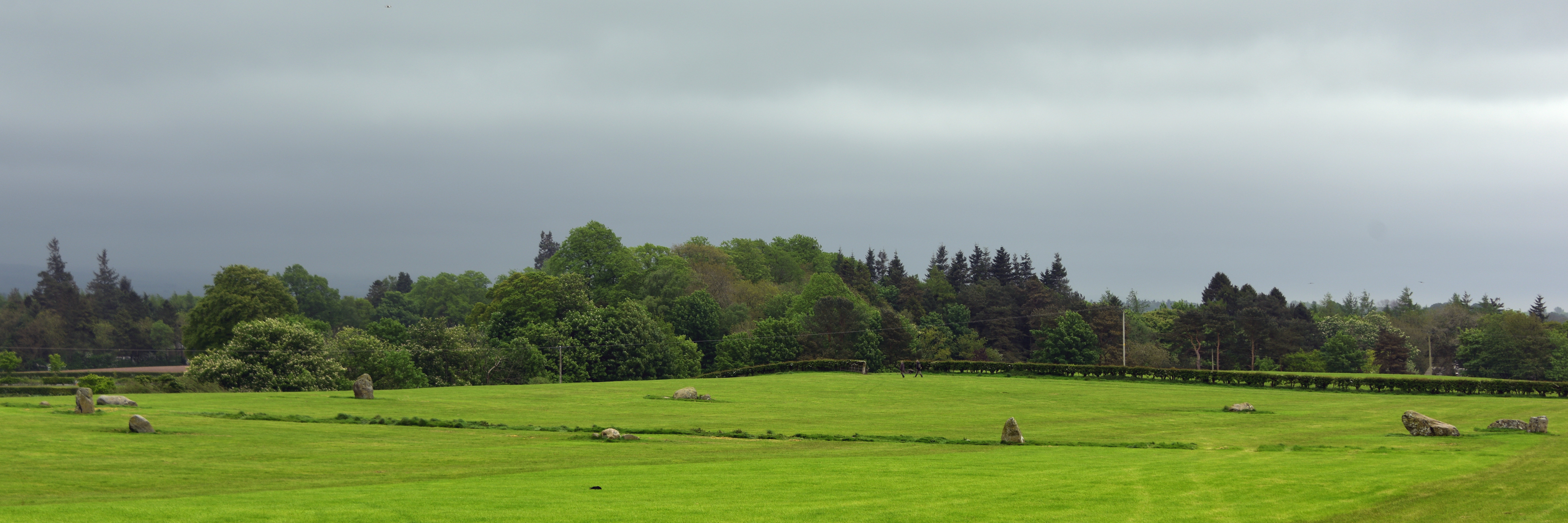
The Twelve Apostles

== See also ==
- Stone circles in the British Isles and Brittany
- List of stone circles
