= Nine Stones, Altarnun =

Stone circle on Bodmin Moor in Cornwall, England

Nine Stones
- Dons Naw Men (Cornish)
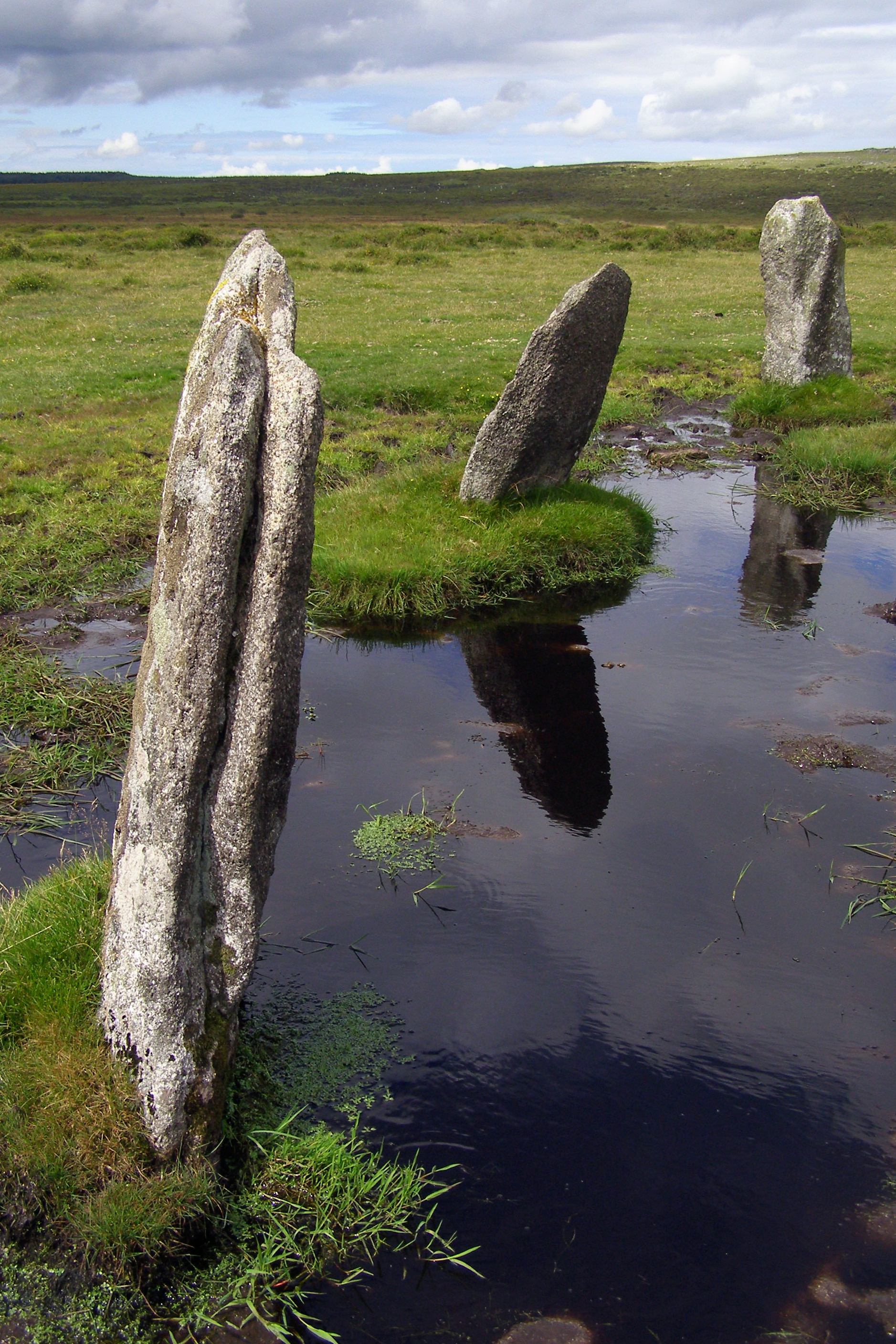
- Three of the Nine Stones

- Location within Cornwall
- 50.576299°N 4.492585°W
- Type: Stone circle
- Periods: Bronze Age
- Location: Bodmin Moor, Cornwall

Site notes
- Owner: English Heritage

The Nine Stones (Cornish: Dons Naw Men) (or Altarnun stone circle) is a stone circle 3 kilometres (1.9 mi) south southeast of Altarnun, 11 kilometres (6.8 mi) west of Launceston on Bodmin Moor in Cornwall, UK.

== Description ==
The Nine Stones is an English Heritage managed property. It was restored in 1889 when only two stones remained standing. The circle is the smallest on Bodmin Moor, only 49 feet (15 m) in diameter with eight granite stones forming the circle and one in the centre. A flat triangular-shaped stone also lies at the base of one of the stones. The stones are irregularly spaced with the tallest being 4.2 feet (1.3 m). A gap in the north suggests where a stone may have stood. The central stone, a granite post 1.1 metres high, may have been moved from the north part of the circle to be used as a boundary stone for the parish boundary.

== Archaeology ==
There are hut circles 550 metres (1,800 ft) to the northeast and another to the south.

== Alignments ==
Alexander Thom proposed a lunar alignment with a nearby stone row which leads towards some cairns, although this has been considered doubtful as the row is likely of medieval construction.

== Literature ==
- William Borlase (1754). Observations on the antiquities, historical and monumental, of the county of Cornwall ...: Consisting of several essays on the first inhabitants, Druid-superstition, customs, and remains of the most remote antiquity, in Britain, and the British Isles ... With a summary of the religious, civil, and military state of Cornwall before the Norman Conquest ... Printed by W. Jackson, in the High-Strand.
- William Copeland Borlase (1872). Naenia Cornubiae: the cromlechs and tumuli of Cornwall. Llanerch. ISBN 978-1-897853-36-8.
- William C. Lukis (1885). The prehistoric stone monuments of the British Isles: Cornwall. Printed for Nichols and Sons for the Society of Antiquaries.
- Aubrey Burl (2005). A guide to the stone circles of Britain, Ireland and Brittany. Yale University Press. ISBN 978-0-300-11406-5.
