= Holywood, Dumfries and Galloway =

Coordinates: 55.110°N 3.658°W

Holywood: Scottish Gaelic: Doire Chonaill
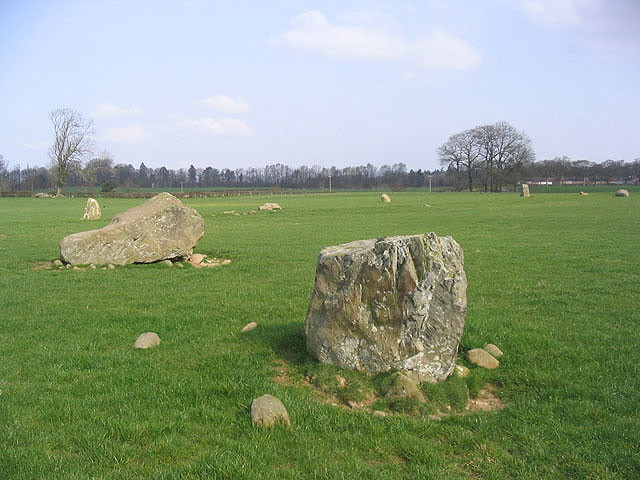
- Twelve Apostles stone circle

- Location within Dumfries and Galloway
- OS grid reference: NX950797
- Council area: Dumfries and Galloway
- Lieutenancy area: Dumfriesshire
- Country: Scotland
- Sovereign state: United Kingdom
- Post town: DUMFRIES
- Postcode district: DG2
- Police: Scotland
- Fire: Scottish
- Ambulance: Scottish
- UK Parliament: Dumfries and Galloway
- Scottish Parliament: Dumfriesshire

Holywood is a village and civil parish in the historical county of Dumfriesshire in Dumfries and Galloway, Scotland. The village of Holywood was developed in the mid twentieth century. In 1949 eighteen houses were built by the county council and followed shortly after by another 38.

Holywood was the site of a Premonstratensian abbey which was established in 1225 and dissolved in 1609. The abbey was dismantled and used to build the parish church in 1778. No remains are now visible.

The site of Holywood Abbey was previously called Dercongal, 'Congal's oak-copse'. The name Holywood refers to this oak-copse. The saint commemorated in this name may be Convallus, disciple of Saint Mungo. However, there are a number of other saints to whom the dedication could apply. The surrounding landscape has several prehistoric monuments, including two cursuses and the Twelve Apostles stone circle, which suggests a continuity of sacred or administrative tradition in the area.

The parish previously had three schools: Speddoch, Steilston and Holywood, near the village. The current school building was built in 1967. Its catchment includes the Woodlands area of Dumfries and part of the catchment of Auldgirth Primary School, which closed in 2000.

Holywood railway station opened as Killylung in 1849 but was renamed Holywood within a year and closed in 1949.
