= Glenquicken stone circle =

Monument

- Billy Diamond's Bridge stone circle
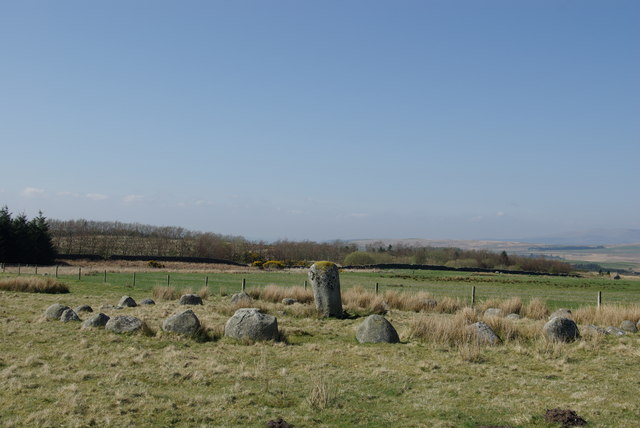
- Stone circle in 2009
- Interactive map of Glenquicken stone circle
- 54.896373°N 4.325507°W
- Type: Stone circle

Scheduled monument
- Official name: Billy Diamond's Bridge stone circle
- Type: Prehistoric ritual and funerary: stone circle or ring
- Designated: 21 December 1934
- Reference no.: SM1023

Glenquicken stone circle or Billy Diamond's Bridge stone circle (grid reference NX50965821) is an oval stone circle with a central pillar, two miles east of Creetown, Dumfries and Galloway. The outer ring is formed of 29 stones. Aubrey Burl has called it "the finest of all centre-stone circles." It is a scheduled monument.

Two other circles to the north-west were marked on the Six-inch First Edition Ordnance Survey map. Alexander Thom planned these in 1939, but they are no longer visible.

== See also ==
- Stone circles in the British Isles and Brittany
- List of stone circles
- Scheduled monuments in Dumfries and Galloway
