= Cairnholy =

Archaeological site in Scotland

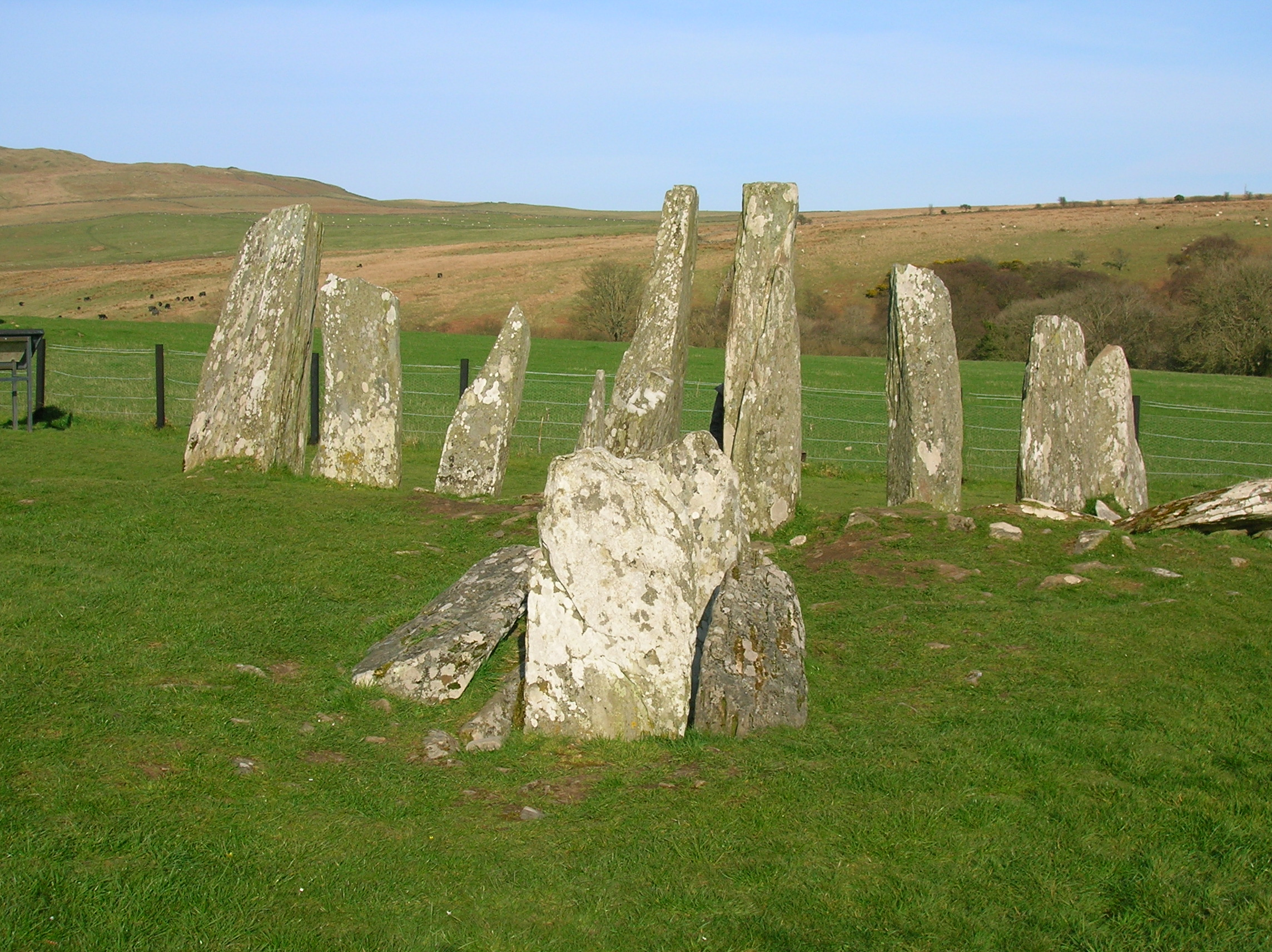
- Cairnholy I

- Location within Dumfries and Galloway
- 54°51′33″N 4°18′34″W
- Type: Chambered tomb
- Periods: Neolithic
- Location: Dumfries and Galloway

Site notes
- Owner: Historic Scotland
- Public access: Yes

Cairnholy (or Cairn Holy) is the site of two Neolithic chambered tombs of the Clyde type. It is located 4 kilometres east of the village of Carsluith in Dumfries and Galloway, Scotland. The tombs are scheduled monuments in the care of Historic Scotland.

The name Cairnholy represents Gaelic *Càrn na h-ulaidhe ‘cairn of the stone tomb’.

== Description ==
The Cairnholy tombs are situated on a hillside overlooking Wigtown Bay. They are situated next to Cairnholy Farm. The site can be accessed at the end of a minor road about 1 kilometre from the A75 road. The two tombs lie within 150 metres of each other.

Both tombs lie open to the sky as most of their original covering stones have been taken in the past to build field walls. Both tombs were partially excavated in 1949 by Stuart Piggott and Terence Powell. Finds from the excavations are in the National Museum of Scotland.

== Cairnholy I ==
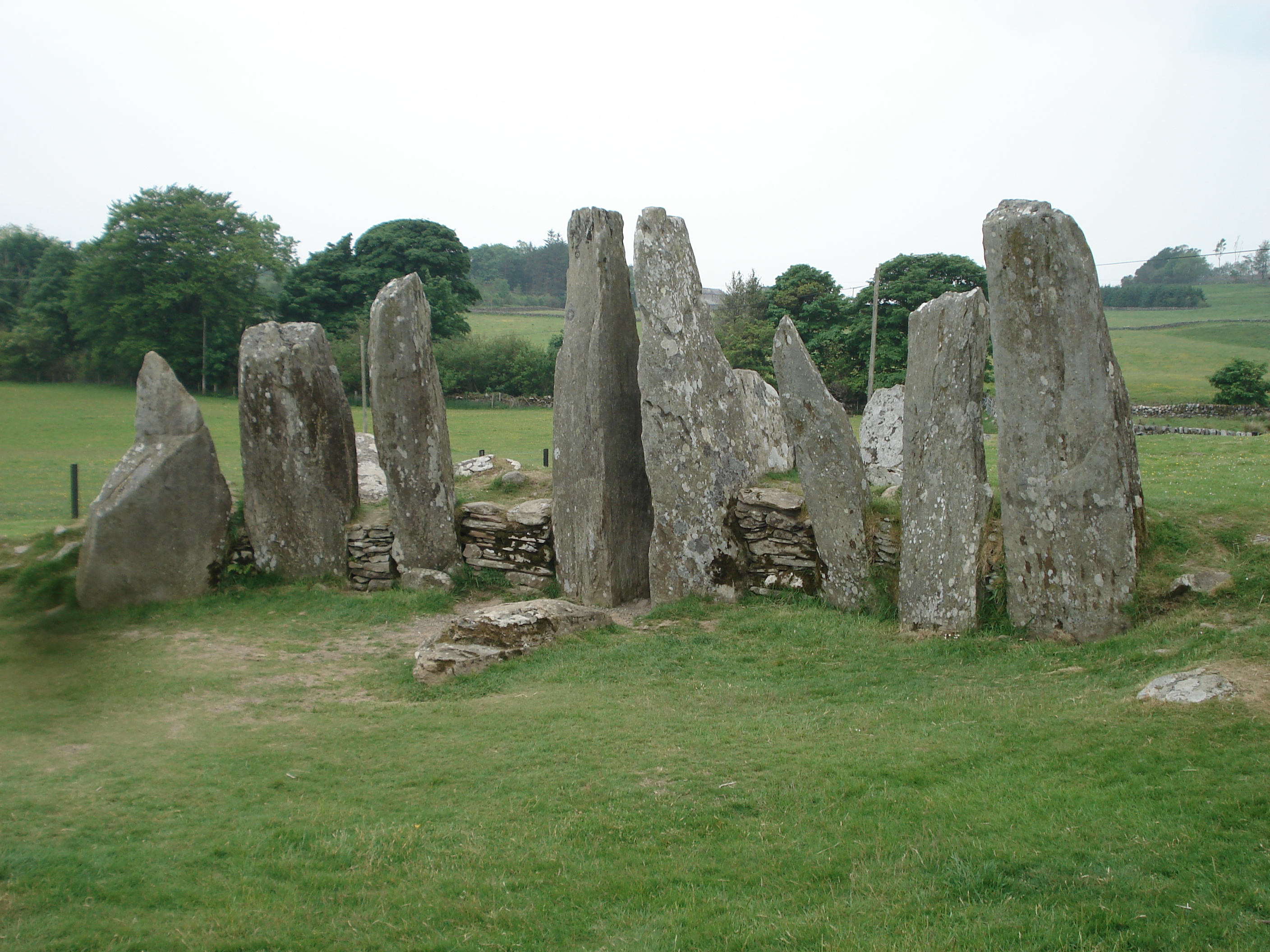
Cairnholy I, façade

Cairnholy I (grid reference NX51765389) is the more elaborate of the two tombs. It measures 50 by 15 metres and has a monumental curving façade, that formed the backdrop to a forecourt in front of the tomb. Excavation showed that several fires had been lit in the forecourt.

The tomb itself has two chambers. The outer chamber, which was entered through the façade, contained a fragment of a jadeite ceremonial axe, together with sherds of Neolithic pottery and a leaf-shaped arrowhead. Late grave-goods comprised Peterborough-ware and Beaker-ware pottery sherds and a flint knife. The inner chamber was built as a closed box, and was inaccessible from the outer one. It was probably originally roofed by a great stone slab resting on the two taller end-slabs. The inner chamber contained a secondary cist, with food vessel sherds and a cup-and-ring carved stone.

== Cairnholy II ==
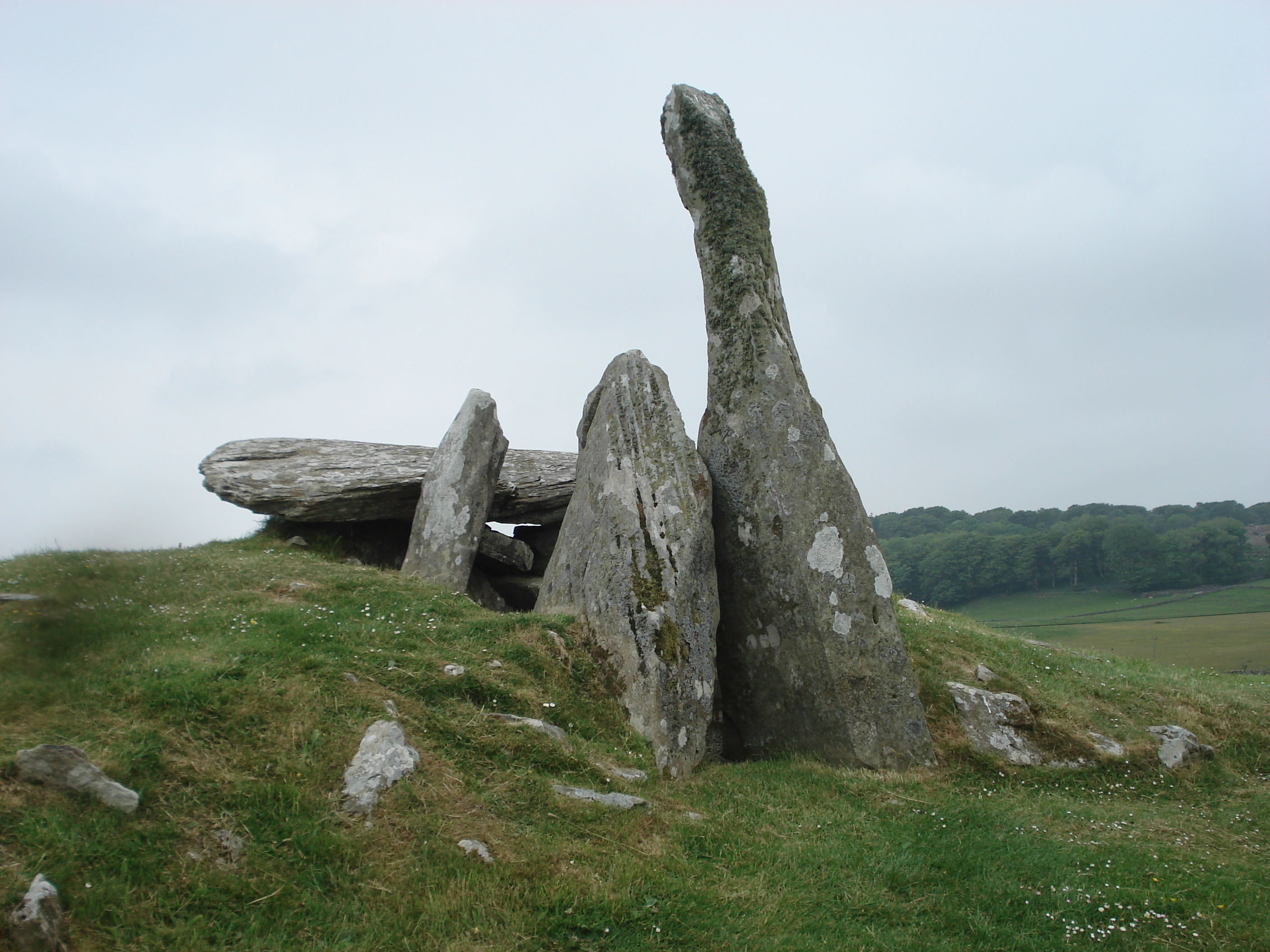
Cairnholy II

Cairnholy II (grid reference NX51825404) is located to the north of Cairnholy I. Local tradition maintains that it was the tomb of Galdus, a mythical Scottish king. It is from this tomb that the nearby farm takes its name. It measures 20 by 12 metres, and is less than 60 centimetres high. It has been robbed of stones but there are still two portal stones in front of the chambered tomb. There is a very shallow v-shaped forecourt at the front of the tomb. The tomb contained two chambers. The rear chamber had been previously robbed, and the other disturbed, but an arrowhead and a flint knife were found within the filling, along with secondary sherds of Beaker pottery.

== Other prehistoric monuments ==
Around 160 metres to the east of Cairnholy farm is the remains of circular cairn less than 15 centimetres high (grid reference NX51975413). When stones were being removed from it some time before 1849, it was found to contain human bones.

The area is surrounded with rocks bearing cup and ring marks.

== Kirkdale Church ==
Around 700 metres to the west are the ruins of Kirkdale Church. The church was dedicated to St Michael. Kirkdale, which belonged to Whithorn Priory, was originally a separate parish, which united with Kirkmabreck in 1618. The church is enclosed by an overgrown burial ground.
