= Whitcastles stone circle =

Stone circle in Dumfries and Galloway, Scotland

Whitcastles Stone Circle
- Little Hartfell stone circle
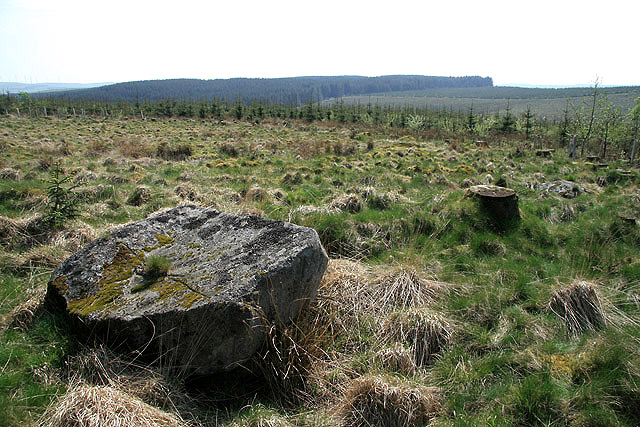
- Whitcastles Stone Circle situated among the tree stumps of a felled Sitka plantation
- Interactive map of Whitcastles Stone Circle
- 55.180763°N 3.220039°W
- Type: Stone circle
- Periods: Bronze Age
- Location: Dumfriesshire

Scheduled monument
- Type: Prehistoric ritual and funerary: stone circle or ring
- Designated: 4 August 1937
- Reference no.: SM636

Whitcastles or Little Hartfell (grid reference NY 2240 8806) is a stone circle 6½ miles NE of Lockerbie, Dumfries and Galloway. Nine fallen stones lie in an oval measuring 55m by 45m. The largest stones lie to the north and south of the circle; interest in cardinal points is a common feature in the stone circles of the Solway Firth. It was designated as a scheduled monument in 1937.

== See also ==
- Stone circles in the British Isles and Brittany
- List of stone circles
