= List of Historic Environment Scotland properties =

This list includes the historic houses, castles, abbeys, museums and other buildings and monuments in the care of Historic Environment Scotland (HES). HES (Scottish Gaelic: Àrainneachd Eachdraidheil Alba) is a non-departmental public body of the Scottish Government, responsible for investigating, caring for and promoting Scotland’s historic environment. It maintains over 300 properties, that together attract more than 3 million visitors annually.

The list is grouped by Scottish council areas.

== Aberdeen City ==
Name	Image	Notes
St Machar's Cathedral Transepts		The ruined transepts of St Machar's Cathedral.

== Aberdeenshire ==
Name	Image	Notes
Brandsbutt Stone		An early Pictish symbol stone.
Corgarff Castle		Tower house surrounded by a star-shaped perimeter wall of 18th-century date.
Cullerlie Stone Circle		A stone circle of eight stones.
Culsh Earth House		A well-preserved souterrain.
Deer Abbey		Remains of a Cistercian monastery.
Duff House		Early Georgian estate house designed by William Adam for the Earl of Fife.
Dyce Symbol Stones		Two Pictish stones, one with the older type of incised symbols.
Easter Aquhorthies Stone Circle		A recumbent stone circle about 4000 years old.
Glenbuchat Castle		A Z-plan castle.
Huntly Castle		Ruined baronial castle.
Kildrummy Castle		A 13th-century castle.
Kinkell Church		Ruins of a 16th-century parish church.
Kinnaird Head Castle Lighthouse		16th-century castle altered in 1787 to take the first lighthouse built by the Commissioners of the Northern Lighthouses.
Kinnaird Head Wine Tower		A 16th-century tower.
Loanhead Stone Circle		The best known of a group of recumbent stone circles.
Maiden Stone		Pictish cross slab of the 9th century AD.
Memsie Cairn		A large Bronze Age burial cairn.
Peel Ring of Lumphanan		Earthworks of a 13th-century motte-and-bailey castle.
Picardy Symbol Stone		Pictish symbol stones.
St Mary's Kirk, Auchindoir		Medieval parish church.
Tarves Medieval Tomb		Altar tomb of William Forbes.
Tolquhon Castle		Castle built by William Forbes, 7th Laird of Tolquhon, from 1584 to 1589.
Tomnaverie Stone Circle		A recumbent stone circle about 4000 years old.

== Angus ==
Name	Image	Notes
Aberlemno Sculptured Stones		Range of Pictish sculptured stones depicting a hunting scene, battle scene and an army of men.
Arbroath Abbey		Arbroath Abbey is famous for its association with the Declaration of Arbroath.
Ardestie Earth House		A curved underground gallery.
Brechin Cathedral Round Tower		One of the two remaining round towers of the Irish type in Scotland.
Carlungie Earth House		A complex underground structure of Iron Age date.
Caterthuns		Two large hill forts.
Eassie Sculptured Stone		An elaborately sculptured Pictish cross-slab.
Edzell Castle		Ruined 16th-century castle with an early-17th-century walled garden.
Lindsay Burial Aisle		Remains of the 14th-century Edzell Old Church.
Maison Dieu Chapel, Brechin		Part of the south wall of a chapel, belonging to a medieval hospital founded in the 1260s.
Restenneth Priory		A monastic house of Augustinian canons founded in 1153.
St Orland's Stone		A tall, Pictish cross-slab with a prominent, ornate cross.
St Vigeans Sculptured Stones		A collection of over 30 Pictish carved stones.
Tealing Dovecot		A dovecot of the late 16th century.
Tealing Earth House		An Iron Age earth house or souterrain.

== Argyll and Bute ==
Name	Image	Notes
Ardchattan Priory		The ruins of a Valliscaulian priory founded in 1230 and later converted to secular use.
Bonawe Historic Iron Furnace		The most complete charcoal-fuelled ironworks in Britain, founded in 1753.
Carnasserie Castle		Home of John Carswell, first Protestant Bishop of the Isles.
Castle Sween		One of the earliest castles in Scotland.
Dunstaffnage Castle and Chapel		Stronghold of the MacDougalls.
Eileach an Naoimh		Ruins of Early Christian beehive cells, a chapel and a graveyard on a small island in the Firth of Lorne.
St Cormac's Chapel, Eilean Mor		A chapel on a small island in the Sound of Jura. Site includes St Cormac's Cross and St Cormac's Cave.
Inchkenneth Chapel		Medieval church.
Iona Abbey		One of Scotland's most historic and sacred sites.
Iona Nunnery		One of the best-preserved medieval nunnery churches in the British Isles.
Keills Chapel		A small West Highland chapel housing a collection of 12th-century grave slabs.
Kilberry Sculptured Stones		A collection of late-medieval sculptured stones gathered from the Kilberry estate.
Kilchurn Castle		Four-storey tower built in the mid-15th century by Sir Colin Campbell.
Kildalton Cross		The finest intact high cross in Scotland carved in the late 8th century.
Kilmartin Glen: Achnabreck Cup And Ring Marks		The exposed crest of a rocky ridge with well-preserved cup and ring marks of early prehistoric date.
Kilmartin Glen: Ballygowan Cup And Ring Marks		Cup and ring marks on natural rock faces, of early prehistoric date.
Kilmartin Glen: Baluachraig Cup And Ring Marks		Several groups of early prehistoric cup and ring marks on natural rock faces. Close to Dunchraigaig cairn.
Kilmartin Glen: Cairnbaan Cup And Ring Marks		Carved stone of the Bronze Age within Kilmartin Glen.
Kilmartin Glen: Dunadd Fort		Well-preserved hill fort of Kilmartin Glen.
Kilmartin Glen: Dunchraigaig Cairn		Bronze Age cairn within Kilmartin Glen.
Kilmartin Glen: Glebe Cairn, Kilmartin		Early Bronze Age burial cairn.
Kilmartin Glen: Kilmartin Sculptured Stones		Early-medieval and medieval crosses of Kilmartin Glen.
Kilmartin Glen: Kilmichael Glassary Cup And Ring Marks		Early prehistoric cup and ring carvings of Kilmartin Glen.
Nether Largie Cairns		A Neolithic and two Bronze Age cairns of Kilmartin Glen.
Ri Cruin Cairn		Bronze Age burial cairn within Kilmartin Glen.
Temple Wood Stone Circles		Standing stones of Kilmartin Glen dating to about 3000 BC.
Kilmodan Sculptured Stones		A group of West Highland carved grave slabs exhibited in a burial aisle within Kilmodan churchyard.
Kilmory Knap Chapel		A small medieval chapel with a collection of typical West Highland grave slabs and some early medieval sculpture.
Maclean's Cross		A 15th-century free-standing cross.
Rothesay Castle		Castle with a long and close association with the Stewart Kings of Scotland.
Skipness Castle and Chapel		A 13th-century castle with a 16th-century tower house in one corner.
St Blane's Church, Kingarth		A 12th-century Romanesque chapel.
St Mary's Chapel, Rothesay		Late-medieval remains of the chancel of the Parish Church of St Mary.

== Ayrshire ==
=== East Ayrshire ===
Name	Image	Notes
Loch Doon Castle		Castle containing an eleven-sided curtain wall of fine masonry.

=== North Ayrshire ===
Name	Image	Notes
Auchagallon Stone Circle		A Bronze Age kerb cairn.
Carn Ban		One of the most famous of the Neolithic long cairns of south-west Scotland.
Kilpatrick Dun		Ruins of a circular drystone homestead of unknown date.
Kilwinning Abbey		Remains of a Tironensian-Benedictine abbey.
Lochranza Castle		An L-plan tower house situated on a promontory on the Isle of Arran.
Machrie Moor Stone Circles		Remains of six stone circles of Bronze Age date.
Moss Farm Road Stone Circle		The remains of a Bronze Age cairn.
Skelmorlie Aisle		Monument erected for Sir Robert Montgomerie of Skelmorlie.
Torr a'Chaisteal		A circular Iron Age fort on a ridge.
Torrylin Cairn		A Neolithic chambered cairn.

=== South Ayrshire ===
Name	Image	Notes
Crossraguel Abbey		Abbey founded early in the 13th century by the Earl of Carrick.
Dundonald Castle		Castle built by Robert II in the 1370s to mark his succession to the throne of Scotland.
Maybole Collegiate Church		College associated with St Mary Chapel.

== Clackmannanshire ==
Name	Image	Notes
Castle Campbell		15th-century fortress situated above Dollar Glen.
Clackmannan Tower		A 14th-century keep.

== Dumfries and Galloway ==
Name	Image	Notes
Barsalloch Fort		An Iron Age promontory fort, defended by a deep u-shaped ditch.
Caerlaverock Castle		Castle with moat, twin towered gatehouse and imposing battlements.
Cairn Holy Chambered Cairns		Two Neolithic burial cairns, of a type characteristic of Galloway.
Cardoness Castle		A well-preserved six-storey tower house of the McCulloch dating back to the 15th century.
Carsluith Castle		A well-preserved ruin of a tower house of 16th-century date.
Chapel Finian		Remains of a small chapel built in the Irish style.
Druchtag Motte		An example of a motte castle.
Drumcoltran Tower		A well-preserved mid 16th-century tower.
Drumtroddan Cup And Ring Marked Rocks		Three groups of well-defined cup and ring marks on bedrock probably carved in the Bronze Age.
Drumtroddan standing stones		An alignment of three prehistoric stones.
Dundrennan Abbey		Cistercian abbey built in the latter half of the 12th century.
Glenluce Abbey		Abbey founded around 1192.
Kirkmadrine Early Christian Stones		Three of the earliest Christian memorial stones in Britain.
Laggangairn Standing Stones		Stones carved with early Christian crosses.
Lincluden Collegiate Church		Remains of a collegiate church and the accommodation for its canons founded in 1389.
Lochmaben Castle		A Z-plan tower house.
MacLellan's Castle		Late 16th-century noble residence.
Merkland Cross		A carved wayside cross of the 15th century.
Morton Castle		A late-13th-century hall house, a stronghold of the Douglases.
New Abbey Corn Mill		Fully restored water-powered corn mill.
Orchardton Tower		Tower house of the mid-15th-century.
Rispain Camp		Rectangular settlement defended by a bank and ditch.
Ruthwell Cross		Anglian Cross dating from the end of the 7th century.
St Ninian's Cave		Cave traditionally associated with St Ninian.
St Ninian's Chapel		Restored ruins of a 13th-century chapel, probably used by pilgrims on their way to Whithorn.
Sweetheart Abbey		Abbey founded by Lady Dervorgilla of Galloway in memory of her husband John Balliol.
Threave Castle		A 14th-century tower built by Archibald the Grim, Lord of Galloway, on an island in the River Dee.
Torhouse Stone Circle		A Bronze Age stone circle consisting of 19 boulders.
Wanlockhead Beam Engine		An early-19th-century wooden water-balance pump for draining a lead mine.
Whithorn Priory		Cradle of Christianity in Scotland.

== Dunbartonshire ==
=== East Dunbartonshire ===
Name	Image	Notes
Antonine Wall: Bar Hill Fort		Highest fort on the Antonine Wall.
Antonine Wall: Bearsden Bath House		Remains of a bath-house and latrine built in the 2nd century AD.

=== West Dunbartonshire ===
Name	Image	Notes
Dumbarton Castle		Dumbarton was the centre of the ancient kingdom of Strathclyde from the 5th century until 1018.

== Dundee City ==
Name	Image	Notes
Broughty Castle		Castle, built hastily, but perhaps unnecessarily. It figured in only two national emergencies over 450 years.
Claypotts Castle		A 16th-century castle.

== Edinburgh, City of ==
Name	Image	Notes
Corstorphine Dovecot		A large circular ‘beehive’ dovecot.
Craigmillar Castle		A well-preserved medieval castle, with a tower house, courtyard and gardens.
Eagle Rock, Cramond		A much-defaced carving on natural rock.
Edinburgh Castle		World-famous castle which dominates the sky-line of the city of Edinburgh.
Holyrood Abbey		The ruined nave of the 12th- and 13th-century abbey church, and a three-storey building on Abbey Strand from the late 15th or early 16th century.
Holyrood Park		Historic landscape in the heart of the city, with dramatic crags and hills.
St Triduana's Chapel, Restalrig Collegiate Church		Shrine of St Triduana, a Pictish saint.
Trinity House		Home to a collection of maritime memorabilia.

== Falkirk ==
Name	Image	Notes
Antonine Wall: Castlecary		The low earthworks of a fort.
Antonine Wall: Rough Castle		Best-preserved length of rampart and ditch.
Antonine Wall: Seabegs Wood		A stretch of rampart and ditch with the military way behind.
Antonine Wall: Watling Lodge		A stretch of rampart and ditch.
Blackness Castle		Castle built by one of Scotland's most powerful families, the Crichtons.
Kinneil House		15th-century tower remodelled by the Earl of Arran.
Westquarter Dovecot		Rectangular dovecot with a heraldic panel dated 1647.

== Fife ==
Name	Image	Notes
Aberdour Castle		Castle with a walled garden and terraces with a dovecot.
Blackfriars Chapel		A vaulted side apse survives of this church of Dominican friars, which was built in about 1516.
Culross Abbey		The remains of a Cistercian monastery founded in 1217.
Dogton Stone		Once a free-standing cross probably of 9th-century date.
Dunfermline Abbey		The Abbey Church is the last resting place of many Scottish kings and queens.
Dunfermline Palace		Former Scottish royal palace.
Inchcolm Abbey		Group of monastic buildings located on the island of Inchcolm in the Firth of Forth.
Ravenscraig Castle		One of the earliest artillery forts in Scotland.
Scotstarvit Tower		Renowned as the home of Sir John Scot.
St Andrews Castle		The main residence of the bishops and archbishops of St Andrews.
St Andrews Cathedral		Remains of medieval Scotland's largest and most magnificent church.
St Bridget's Kirk		The shell of a medieval church.
St Mary's Church, Kirkheugh		Earliest collegiate church in Scotland.
West Port		One of the few surviving city gates in Scotland.

== Glasgow City ==
Name	Image	Notes
Crookston Castle		Ruin of an unusual 15th-century castle.
Glasgow Cathedral		Cathedral built on the site where St Mungo was thought to have been buried.

== Highland ==
Name	Image	Notes
Ardclach Bell Tower		A fortified bell tower built in 1655 on the hill above the parish church of Ardclach.
Beauly Priory		The ruined church of a Valliscaulian priory, one of three founded in 1230.
Bridge of Oich		Suspension bridge.
Cairn o' Get		A horned and chambered burial cairn.
Carn Liath		A typical Sutherland broch.
Castle of Old Wick		The ruin of the best-preserved Norse castle in Scotland.
Clava Cairns		A well-preserved Bronze Age cemetery.
Cnoc Freiceadain Long Cairns		Two unexcavated long-horned burial cairns of Neolithic date.
Corrimony Chambered Cairn		An excavated passage grave of probable Bronze Age date.
Dun Beag		A fine example of a Hebridean broch.
Dun Dornaigil		A well-preserved broch.
Fort George		The mightiest artillery fortification in Britain.
Fortrose Cathedral		Beautiful red sandstone cathedral.
Glenelg Brochs: Dun Telve and Dun Troddan		Two broch towers.
Grey Cairns of Camster		Two chambered burial cairns of Neolithic date.
Hill O' Many Stanes		More than 22 rows of low slabs.
Hilton of Cadboll Chapel		The foundations of a small rectangular chapel, with a reproduction of a Pictish stone nearby.
Inverlochy Castle		One of Scotland's earliest stone castles.
Knocknagael Boar Stone		A rough slab incised with the Pictish symbols, kept in the Highland Council offices, Inverness.
Ruthven Barracks		An infantry barracks erected in 1719 following the Jacobite rising of 1715.
St Mary's Chapel, Crosskirk		A simple dry-stone chapel.
Urquhart Castle		Once one of Scotland's largest castles, on the banks of Loch Ness.

== Inverclyde ==
Name	Image	Notes
Newark Castle		Firth of Clyde castle mainly associated with the notorious Patrick Maxwell.

== Lanarkshire ==
=== North Lanarkshire ===
Name	Image	Notes
Antonine Wall: Croy Hill		Part of the Antonine Wall - Rome's north-west frontier.
Antonine Wall: Dullatur		Part of the Antonine Wall - Rome's north-west frontier.
Antonine Wall: Westerwood to Castlecary		Part of the Antonine Wall - Rome's north-west frontier.

=== South Lanarkshire ===
Name	Image	Notes
Biggar Gasworks Museum		The only surviving town coal-gas works in Scotland.
Bothwell Castle		Scotland's largest and finest 13th-century castle. Part of the original circular keep survives.
Cadzow Castle		Ruined castle in the woods of Hamilton.
Coulter Motte		A Norman castle mound.
Craignethan Castle		An early artillery fortification with a residential tower.
St Bride's Church, Douglas		Choir containing three canopied monuments to the Douglas family.

== Lothian ==
=== East Lothian ===
Name	Image	Notes
Chesters Hill Fort		One of the best-preserved Iron Age hill forts in Scotland.
Dirleton Castle		Medieval fortified residence with garden.
Doon Hill		A rare site of the Anglian occupation of southeast Scotland.
Dunglass Collegiate Church		Church founded in 1450.
Hailes Castle		A ruin incorporating a fortified manor of 13th-century date.
Lauderdale Aisle, St Mary's Church		The former sacristy of the great 15th-century St Mary's Collegiate Church, Haddington.
Ormiston Market Cross		Free-standing 15th-century cross.
Preston Market Cross		The only surviving example of a market cross of its type on its original site.
Seton Collegiate Church		Ecclesiastical kirk set in wooded surroundings.
St Martin's Kirk, Haddington		Remains of a Romanesque church.
Tantallon Castle		Seat of the Douglas Earls of Angus, one of the most powerful baronial families in Scotland.

=== Midlothian ===
Name	Image	Notes
Castlelaw Hill Fort		Iron Age hill fort.
Crichton Castle		Residence of the Crichtons and later home to the Earls of Bothwell.

=== West Lothian ===
Name	Image	Notes
Cairnpapple Hill		Burial site dating to 3,000 BC.
Linlithgow Palace		The ruins of Linlithgow Palace set in a park beside a loch.
Torphichen Preceptory		Tower and transepts of a church built by the Knights Hospitaller of the Order of St John of Jerusalem.

== Moray ==
Name	Image	Notes
Auchindoun Castle		Castle built about 1480 by Thomas Cochrane, Earl of Mar.
Balvenie Castle		Ruined castle built in the 12th century by a branch of the powerful Comyn family.
Burghead Well		A rock-cut well.
Dallas Dhu Historic Distillery		Distillery built in 1898 to produce malt whisky for Glasgow firm Wright and Greig's popular ‘Roderick Dhu’ blend.
Deskford Church		Small late medieval church.
Duffus Castle		One of the finest examples of a motte and bailey castle in Scotland.
Elgin Cathedral		Home to Scotland's finest octagonal chapter house.
Elgin Cathedral: Bishop's House		Partially ruined 15th-century defensible L-plan town house, within the precincts of Elgin Cathedral.
Elgin Cathedral: Pans Port		The only surviving medieval archway of Elgin Cathedral's precinct walls.
Spynie Palace		Residence of the bishops of Moray.
St Peter's Kirk and Parish Cross, Duffus		Remains of a 14th-century western tower and a 16th-century vaulted porch.
Sueno's Stone		Pictish monument.

== Orkney Islands ==
Name	Image	Notes
Barnhouse Settlement		Neolithic settlement.
Barnhouse Stone	Barnhouse_stone_-_geograph.org.uk_-_6733093	Solitary standing stone.
Bishop's Palace, Kirkwall		Palace built for the first bishop of Orkney.
Blackhammer Chambered Cairn		Neolithic burial cairn.
Broch of Gurness		Iron-Age broch and surrounding settlement.
Brough of Birsay		Site featuring Pictish and Norse power-base with Pictish well.
Brough of Deerness		Viking settlement and chapel. Joint ownership agreement with Orkney Islands Council since 1993.
Cobbie Row's Castle		One of the earliest stone castles to survive in Scotland. Also known as Cubbie Roo's Castle.
Cuween Hill Chambered Cairn		Neolithic chambered tomb.
Dounby Click Mill		The last surviving horizontal water mill in Orkney.
Dwarfie Stane		Neolithic burial chamber.
Earl's Bu		Remains of a medieval Manor House.
Earl's Palace, Birsay		16th-century remains of the residence of Robert Stewart, Earl of Orkney.
Earl's Palace, Kirkwall		17th-century palace built by Patrick Stewart, 2nd Earl of Orkney.
Eynhallow Church		Ruined 12th-century monastic church.
Grain Earth House		Iron Age earth house.
Hackness Martello Tower and Battery		19th century fort and battery on the island of South Walls.
Holm of Papa Westray Chambered Cairn		A massive tomb.
Knap of Howar		Probably the oldest standing stone houses in north-west Europe.
Knowe of Yarso Chambered Cairn		An oval cairn with concentric walls enclosing a Neolithic chambered tomb.
Links of Noltland		Sand dunes seal and protect significant prehistoric remains.
Maeshowe Chambered Cairn		The finest chambered tomb in north-west Europe.
Midhowe Broch		A well-preserved broch, with remains of later buildings around it.
Midhowe Chambered Cairn		A megalithic chambered tomb of Neolithic date.
Noltland Castle		A ruined Z-plan tower, built between 1560 and 1573 but never completed.
Orphir Round Church		Remains of early 12th-century round church next to Earl's Bu.
Pierowall Church		Remains of 13-century church.
Quoyness Chambered Cairn		A megalithic tomb containing a passage and main chamber, with six subsidiary cells.
Rennibister Earth House		An Orkney earth house.
Ring of Brodgar		A circle of upright stones with an enclosing ditch spanned by causeways, dating to late Neolithic period.
Skara Brae		One of the best preserved groups of prehistoric houses in Western Europe, part of the Heart of Neolithic Orkney World Heritage Site.
St Magnus Church, Egilsay		Ruin of a 12th-century church, graveyard still in use.
St. Mary's Chapel, Wyre		Ruin of a 12th-century chapel and graveyard.
Stones of Stenness		The remains of a stone circle surrounded by remains of a circular earthen bank.
Taversöe Tuick Chambered Cairn		Neolithic chambered cairn.
Tormiston Mill		A 19th-century watermill. Closed to the public since September 2016.
Unstan Chambered Cairn		A mound covering a stone burial chamber divided by slabs into five compartments.
Watchstone	0490_Bridge_of_Brodgar_-_Stennes_watch_stone_E	Solitary standing stone at Brodgar Bridge.
Westside Church, Tuquoy		A small 12th-century nave-and-chancel church.
Wideford Hill chambered cairn		A Neolithic chambered cairn with three concentric walls and a burial chamber with three large cells.

== Outer Hebrides ==
Name	Image	Notes
Arnol Blackhouse		A traditional thatched house.
Calanais Standing Stones		A cross-shaped setting of standing stones erected around 3000 BC.
Dun Carloway		One of the best preserved broch towers in Scotland.
Kisimul Castle		The only significant surviving medieval castle in the Western Isles.
St Clement's Church, Rodel		15th-century church built for the Chiefs of the MacLeods of Harris.
Steinacleit Cairn and Stone Circle		The remains of an enigmatic burial site of early prehistoric date.

== Perth and Kinross ==
Name	Image	Notes
Abernethy Round Tower		One of the two round towers of Irish style surviving in Scotland, dating from the end of the 11th century.
Ardunie Roman Signal Station		The site of a Roman watch tower dating to the first century.
Balvaird Castle		A late-15th-century tower on an L plan, extended in 1581 by the addition of a walled courtyard and gatehouse.
Black Hill Roman Camps		Parts of the defences of two Roman marching camps lying to the north of Ardoch Roman Fort.
Burleigh Castle		Complete ruin of a tower house of about 1500.
Dunfallandy Stone		A well-preserved Pictish cross-slab.
Dunkeld Cathedral		Cathedral containing a fine effigy of the Robert III's brother.
Elcho Castle		Complete 16th-century fortified mansion.
Fowlis Wester Sculptured Stone		A tall cross-slab with Pictish symbols.
Huntingtower Castle		The House of Ruthven containing a fine painted ceiling.
Innerpeffray Chapel		A rectangular collegiate church founded in 1508.
Lochleven Castle		The setting for the most traumatic year in the life of Mary Queen of Scots.
Meigle Sculptured Stone Museum		Museum housing a collection of carved stones dating from the late eighth to the late tenth centuries.
Muir o' Fauld Roman Signal Station		The site of a 1st-century Roman watch tower on the Gask Ridge.
Muthill Old Church and Tower		Ruins of an important medieval parish church.
St Mary's Church, Grandtully		A 16th-century parish church.
St Serf's Church, Dunning and Dupplin Cross		Picturesque parish church with Pictish cross.
Stanley Mills		A unique complex of water-powered cotton mills situated on the River Tay.
Sunnybrae Cottage		Possibly the oldest house in Pitlochry.
Tullibardine Chapel		One of the most complete and unaltered small medieval churches in Scotland.

== Renfrewshire ==
Name	Image	Notes
Barochan Cross		Free-standing early medieval cross.
Castle Semple Collegiate Church		A late Gothic church.

== Scottish Borders ==
Name	Image	Notes
Cross Kirk, Peebles		Remains of a Trinitarian Friary.
Dere Street Roman Road, Soutra		Stretch of Roman road.
Dryburgh Abbey		Medieval abbey ruins.
Edin's Hall Broch		One of the few Iron Age brochs in lowland Scotland.
Edrom Arch		Romanesque doorway in the graveyard of Edrom church.
Foulden Tithe Barn		A two-storey barn used for storing payments made in grain to the parish church.
Greenknowe Tower		Tower house built in 1581.
Hermitage Castle		13/14th-century castle.
Jedburgh Abbey		Abbey, founded in 1138, which was a frequent target for invading border armies.
Kelso Abbey		West end of the great abbey church of the Tironensians.
Melrose Abbey		Ruined abbey on a grand scale with lavishly decorated masonry.
Melrose Abbey: Commendator's House		15th-century accommodations for the Abbey Commendator.
Smailholm Tower		Well-preserved 15th-century rectangular tower.

== Shetland Islands ==
Name	Image	Notes
Clickimin Broch		Iron Age broch tower.
Fort Charlotte		A five-sided artillery fort with bastions projecting from each corner.
Jarlshof		Ancient settlement containing remains dating from 2500 BC up to the 17th century AD.
Mousa Broch		Well-preserved Iron Age broch tower.
Muness Castle		A late-16th-century tower house.
Ness of Burgi		A defensive stone-built blockhouse.
Scalloway Castle		A castellated mansion.
Stanydale Temple		A Neolithic hall.

== Stirling ==
Name	Image	Notes
Argyll's Lodging		A near-complete example of a 17th-century townhouse.
Cambuskenneth Abbey		Home to the tomb of James III and Queen Margaret and a display of medieval graveslabs and architectural fragments.
Doune Castle		A late-14th-century courtyard castle built for the Regent Albany.
Dunblane Cathedral		Medieval church. The lower part of the tower is Romanesque, but the larger part of the building is of the 13th century.
Inchmahome Priory		Augustinian monastery dating from 1238 set on an island in the Lake of Menteith.
King's Knot		Earthworks of a formal garden.
Mar's Wark		Renaissance mansion built by the Earl of Mar.
Stirling Castle		One of Scotland's grandest castles due to its imposing position and impressive architecture.
Stirling Old Bridge		A bridge built in the 15th or early 16th century.

== See also ==
- List of Cadw properties (Wales)
- List of English Heritage properties
