= Scheduled monuments in Angus =

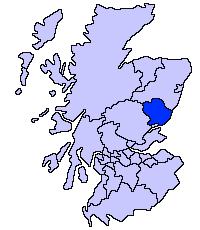
Angus shown within Scotland

A scheduled monument in Scotland is a nationally important archaeological site or monument which is given legal protection by being placed on a list (or "schedule") maintained by Historic Environment Scotland. The aim of scheduling is to preserve the country's most significant sites and monuments as far as possible in the form in which they have been inherited.

The process of scheduling is governed by the Ancient Monuments and Archaeological Areas Act 1979, which aims "to make provision for the investigation, preservation and recording of matters of archaeological or historical interest". The term "scheduled monument" can apply to the whole range of archaeological sites which have been deliberately constructed by human activity but are not always visible above ground. They range from prehistoric standing stones and burial sites, through Roman remains and medieval structures such as castles and monasteries, to later structures such as industrial sites and buildings constructed for the World Wars. Some buildings or structures which were both scheduled and listed have had their listing designations removed to reduce the duplication.

As of 2017 there were 8,238 scheduled monuments in Scotland, of which approximately 379 were in Angus.

== Notable scheduled monuments in Angus ==
Name	Location	Description	Ref No	Image
Colmeallie stone circle	Edzell	Recumbent stone circle	SM116	
Camus's Cross	Monikie	Pictish free-standing stone cross	SM148	
Glamis 2 cross slab	Glamis	Pictish cross slab	SM152	
Invermark Castle	Loch Lee	Rectangular tower house	SM2462	
Finavon Castle	Oathlaw	Remains of a fortified mansion	SM2464	
Red Castle	Inverkeilor	Ruined 15th-century castle	SM2925	
Nevay Church, church and burial ground	Eassie And Nevay	Remains of Nevay Church and its burial ground	SM3002	
Balkello standing stone	Tealing	Prehistoric standing stone	SM6145	
Clova Castle	Clova, Angus	Remains of mediaeval Castle	SM6913	
Edzell Old Church and Lindsay Burial Aisle	Edzell	Buried medieval church and burial building	SM13613	
Aberlemno, cross slab and symbol stones	Aberlemno	Symbol stones	SM90004	
Arbroath Abbey	Arbroath	Remains of Arbroath Abbey	SM90018	
Ardestie souterrain	Monikie	Prehistoric souterrain (earth-house)	SM90021	
Brechin Maison Dieu Chapel	Brechin	Site of the chapel of Maison Dieu hospital	SM90040	
Brechin Cathedral Round Tower	Brechin	Round tower	SM90041	
Carlungie souterrain	Monikie	Prehistoric souterrain (earth-house)	SM90059	
Caterthuns	Menmuir	Two substantial hillforts	SM90069	
Eassie Old Church and cross slab	Eassie	Ruined church and Pictish stone slab	SM90125	
Edzell Castle	Edzell	Ruined castle	SM90136	
Restenneth Priory	Forfar	Ruined medieval priory	SM90246	
Tealing Dovecote	Tealing	Rectangular-shaped late 16th-century doocot	SM90298	
Tealing Earth House	Tealing	Iron Age souterrain	SM90299	

== See also ==
- List of Category A listed buildings in Angus
