= Picardy Stone =

Pictish stone in Aberdeenshire, Scotland

Picardy Symbol Stone
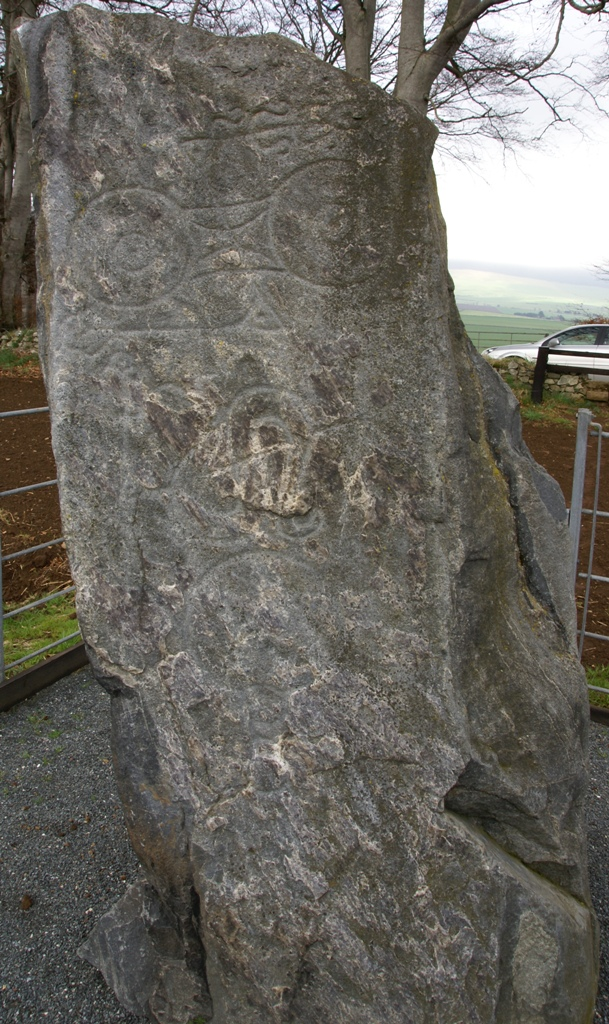
- The Picardy Stone in 2008
- Material: Whinstone
- Height: 2 m (6.6 ft)
- Width: 0.9 m (3.0 ft)
- Symbols: double-disc with z-rod; serpent with z-rod; mirror
- Present location: Southeast of Huntly, Aberdeenshire, Scotland
- Coordinates: 57.361136°N 2.6500232°W
- Culture: Pictish

Designations

Scheduled monument
- Official name: Picardy Stone
- Type: Crosses and carved stones: symbol stone
- Designated: 30 November 1923
- Reference no.: SM90239

The Picardy Symbol Stone is a Pictish symbol stone near Huntly, Aberdeenshire, Scotland.

== Description ==
The stone is a large block of whinstone, 2 metres (6.6 ft) high and 0.9 metres (3.0 ft) wide at its base. It bears several Pictish symbol carvings, including a double-disc with z-rod, serpent with z-rod and a mirror. The carvings of the Picardy Stone are dated to around AD 600. It is a scheduled monument.

== See also ==
- Brandsbutt Stone
- Dyce Symbol Stones
- Maiden Stone
- Scheduled monuments in Aberdeenshire
- List of Historic Environment Scotland properties
