= Moyra Caldecott =

British writer (1927–2015)

- Born: Moyra Brown; 1 June 1927; Pretoria, South Africa
- Died: 23 May 2015 (aged 87); Bath, England
- Education: University of Natal
- Occupation: Author
- Spouse: Oliver Caldecott (m. 1951–1989)
- Children: 3
- Writing career
- Pen name: Olivia Brown
- Genres: Fantasy and historical fiction
- Website: www.moyracaldecott.co.uk

Moyra Caldecott (née Brown, 1 June 1927 – 23 May 2015) was a South African-born British author of historical fiction, fantasy, science fiction and non-fiction. Her works include Guardians of the Tall Stones and The Egyptian Sequence. She also wrote under the pseudonym Olivia Brown.

She was born in Pretoria, South Africa, and moved to London in 1951. She married Oliver Caldecott and raised three children. She had degrees in English and Philosophy and an M.A. in English Literature.

In 2000, she became one of the earliest proponents of commercial e-books when she contracted with Mushroom eBooks to re-publish most of her titles in electronic formats.

She had a reputation as a novelist who wrote as vividly about the adventures and experiences to be encountered in the inner realms of the human consciousness as she did about those in the outer physical world. To Moyra, reality was multidimensional.

In her later years she suffered from progressive aphasia. She died peacefully on 23 May 2015, aged 87.

== Biography ==
=== Early life and education ===
Moyra was born in Pretoria, South Africa, on 1 June 1927 to Jessica Florence (Harris) and Frederick Stanley Brown. Moyra studied at the University of Natal, obtaining degrees in English Literature and Philosophy and a Master's in English Literature. In 1950, she moved to Cape Town and became a lecturer in English at the University of Cape Town, where she met Oliver Caldecott, an anti-apartheid campaigner. In 1951, they moved to the UK and married in London. Once settled, she took evening classes in geology, religious studies, mythology, archaeology, Egyptian hieroglyphics and pottery. She also took up watercolour painting, pottery, batik making and the creation of stained glass.

=== Writing ===
Moyra Caldecott had written since childhood, but first gained attention as a poet. Her work was published in various poetry anthologies throughout the 1950s and '60s. She became Secretary to the acclaimed Dulwich Poetry Group in the 1960s. Plays of hers were performed on radio, but it was not until she started writing novels in her late 40s, that her career took off. She went on to see more than 30 books published.

Her best known work is the Guardians of the Tall Stones Trilogy. Set in Bronze Age Britain, it was inspired by a vivid experience she had in Dyce Stone circle in Scotland, and the world heritage site of Avebury in Wiltshire. For many years this trilogy was required reading for various tour groups visiting the sacred sites of Britain from America, and has been in print continuously since 1977.

Another well-received trilogy, about the rise, fall and rise again of the ancient Egyptian priests of Amun, focused on Akhenaten and Hatshepsut. As a result of these books, she was invited by the pop star Tina Turner to act as a personal guide to the ancient sites of Egypt – an experience that Moyra spoke of with great fondness.

Although fascinated by prehistory and the Celts, Moyra was also knowledgeable about other traditions and devoted the major portion of her life to collecting and examining myths and legends across the world. She followed Jung and Joseph Campbell in believing myths and legends are not "just" stories but actually deep and meaningful expressions of the universal and eternal in the human psyche.

Moyra Caldecott's non-fiction titles include: Crystal Legends, Myths of the Sacred Tree, Women in Celtic Myth, and Mythical Journeys, Legendary Quests.

=== Family ===
Her husband, Oliver Z. S. Caldecott, son of South African artists Harry Stratford Caldecott and Florence Josephine Zerffi, was a fierce and outspoken opponent of apartheid. He fled South Africa during a crackdown on the movement and moved to London, where he continued his political campaigning. He became first an editor for Readers Union and later Chief Editor of Fiction at Penguin Books during the 1960s. After the death of Sir Allen Lane, Caldecott left Penguin to start his own publishing house, Wildwood House, in the 1970s. Throughout his publishing career, he also painted and exhibited widely.

In 1987, with Oliver's health failing, the Caldecotts moved to Bath, a city whose Romano-British heritage Moyra wrote about in two of her novels, The Winged Man (1993) and The Waters of Sul (1997). She was also a founder member of the (now dormant) Bladud Society, dedicated to raising awareness of Bath's Celtic heritage, and in her later years she liked to perform her visionary poetry at local open mic events in the city.

She was made an honorary bard of Bath in 2005 and a memoir of her life, Multi-Dimensional Life, was published on her 80th birthday by the Bath-based firm Mushroom Books.

=== Children ===
Stratford Caldecott (26 November 1953 – 17 July 2014) was an author, editor, publisher, and blogger. His books include Radiance of Being, Beauty for Truth's Sake, All Things Made New, and Not as the World Gives.

Julian Caldecott (born 2 August 1956) is an author, ecologist and blogger. His books include Hunting and Wildlife Management in Sarawak, Designing Conservation Projects, Water: The Causes, Costs and Future of a Global Crisis, Aid Performance and Climate Change, and (as co-editor) World Atlas of Great Apes and their Conservation.

Rachel Caldecott (born 1 August 1960) is a novelist, craftswoman, illustrator, human rights activist and blogger. Her books include Lodève – A Fast Guide to its History, The Panopticon Experiment (Book One of the Siklus Series), and the humorous memoir Blown Out of Proportion: Misadventures of a Glassblower in France.

== Bibliography ==
=== Fiction ===
- Child of the Dark Star (a future fantasy novel). Paperback and eBook. ISBN 1-899142-23-1
- The Winged Man (the legendary King Bladud, Britain c.500 BC). Paperback and eBook. ISBN 978-1-84319-330-2
- The Waters of Sul (set in Aquae Sulis in Roman Britain c.72 AD). Paperback. ISBN 978-1-84319-547-4
- The Silver Vortex (sequel to Guardians of the Tall Stones). Paperback and eBook. ISBN 1-84319-318-3
- Hatshepsut: Daughter of Amun (the story of the female pharaoh Hatshepsut). Paperback and eBook. ISBN 1-84319-263-2
- Akhenaten: Son of the Sun (the story of the pharaoh Akhenaten). Paperback and eBook. ISBN 1-899142-25-8
- Tutankhamun and the Daughter of Ra (the story of the wife of Tutankhamun). Paperback and eBook. ISBN 1-84319-266-7
- The Ghost of Akhenaten (the sequel to the Egyptian sequence). Paperback and eBook. ISBN 1-84319-024-9
- The Green Lady and the King of Shadows. Paperback and eBook. ISBN 978-1-84319-450-7
- The Lily and the Bull (set in Bronze Age Crete). Paperback and eBook. ISBN 1-84319-270-5
- The Tower and the Emerald (a romantic fantasy set in Dark Ages Britain). Paperback and eBook. ISBN 1-84319-271-3
- Three Celtic Tales (three tales from the Mabinogion). Paperback and eBook. ISBN 978-1-84319-548-1
- Etheldreda (life of the Anglo Saxon saint of Ely, 7th century AD). Paperback and eBook. ISBN 1-84319-269-1
- Weapons of the Wolfhound (teenage novel about Vikings set in the Hebrides and Iceland). Paperback and eBook. ISBN 1-84319-268-3
- The Eye of Callanish (the sequel to Weapons of the Wolfhound). Paperback and eBook. ISBN 1-84319-120-2
- The Tall Stones (the first of the Guardians of the Tall Stones sequence)(1977, Popular Library). ISBN 0-445-04365-2
- The Temple of the Sun (the second of the Guardians of the Tall Stones sequence)
- Shadow on the Stones (the third of the Guardians of the Tall Stones sequence)
- Adventures by Leaf Light (stories for little children). Paperback and eBook. ISBN 978-1-84319-551-1

=== Myths and legends ===
- Twins of the Tylwyth Teg (retells a tale from Celtic folklore)
- Taliesin and Avagddu (retells a tale from the Mabinogion)
- Bran, Son of Llyr (retells a tale from the Mabinogion)
- Three Celtic Tales (collected edition of the three stories above) Paperback and eBook ISBN 978-1-84319-548-1
- The Green Lady and the King of Shadows (Glastonbury legends) Paperback and eBook ISBN 978-1-84319-450-7
- Crystal Legends (the lore and legend of crystals and crystal healing) Paperback and eBook ISBN 978-1-84319-326-5
- Women in Celtic Myth (tales of extraordinary women from the ancient Celtic tradition)
- Myths of the Sacred Tree (tree myths and legends from around the world)
- Mythical Journeys: Legendary Quests (the spiritual search - traditional stories from world mythology). Paperback and eBook. ISBN 978-1-84319-523-8

=== Poetry ===
- The Breathless Pause (a selection of poems). Paperback and eBook. ISBN 978-1-84319-552-8

=== Autobiography ===
- Multi-Dimensional Life (a writer's life and inspiration). Paperback and eBook. ISBN 978-1-84319-549-8
