= Tealing Earth House =

Souterrain in Angus, Scotland

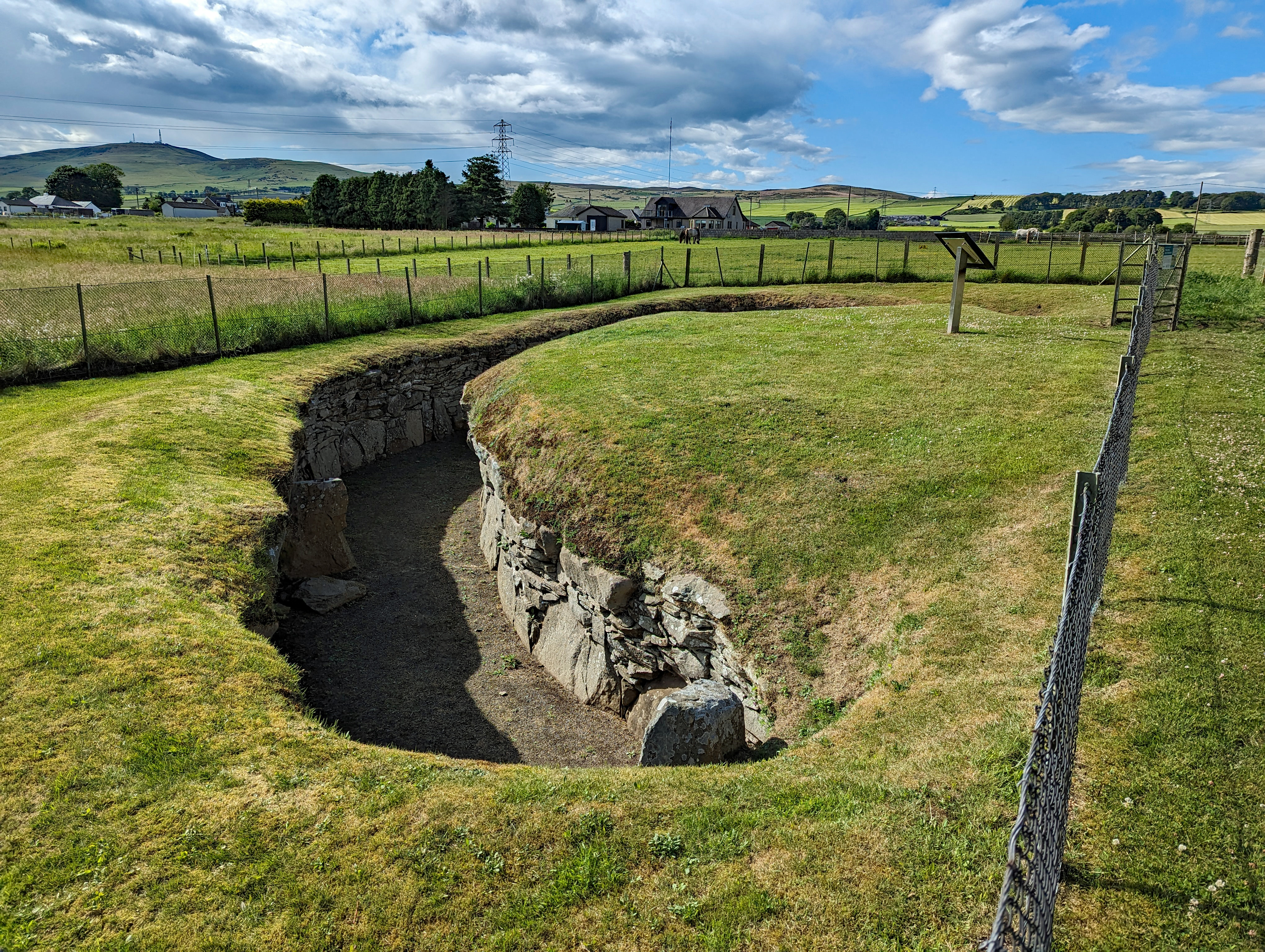
- Outside view of Tealing Earth House
- Interactive map of Tealing Earth House
- 56.531855°N 2.957222°W
- Type: Souterrain
- Location: Tealing, Angus, Scotland

Site notes
- Material: Stone
- Height: 2 m (6 ft 7 in)
- Length: 24.4 m (80 ft)
- Width: 2.5 m (8 ft 2 in)
- Management: Historic Environment Scotland
- Public access: Yes
- Website: Historic Environment Scotland

Scheduled monument
- Official name: Tealing, Souterrain
- Type: Prehistoric domestic and defensive: souterrain, earth-house
- Designated: 10 November 1937
- Reference no.: SM90299

Tealing Earth House is an Iron Age souterrain in Tealing, Angus, Scotland.

== Description ==
The Tealing Earth House dates from around the first and second centuries AD. The underground construction probably served as a storage place.

The souterrain is curved with a length of 24.4 m (80 ft), width of 2.5 m (8 ft 2 in) and a height of 2 m (6 ft 7 in). It originally would have had stone slabs covering the chamber. Two Bronze Age cup and ring marked stones were repurposed for the structure's internal walls.

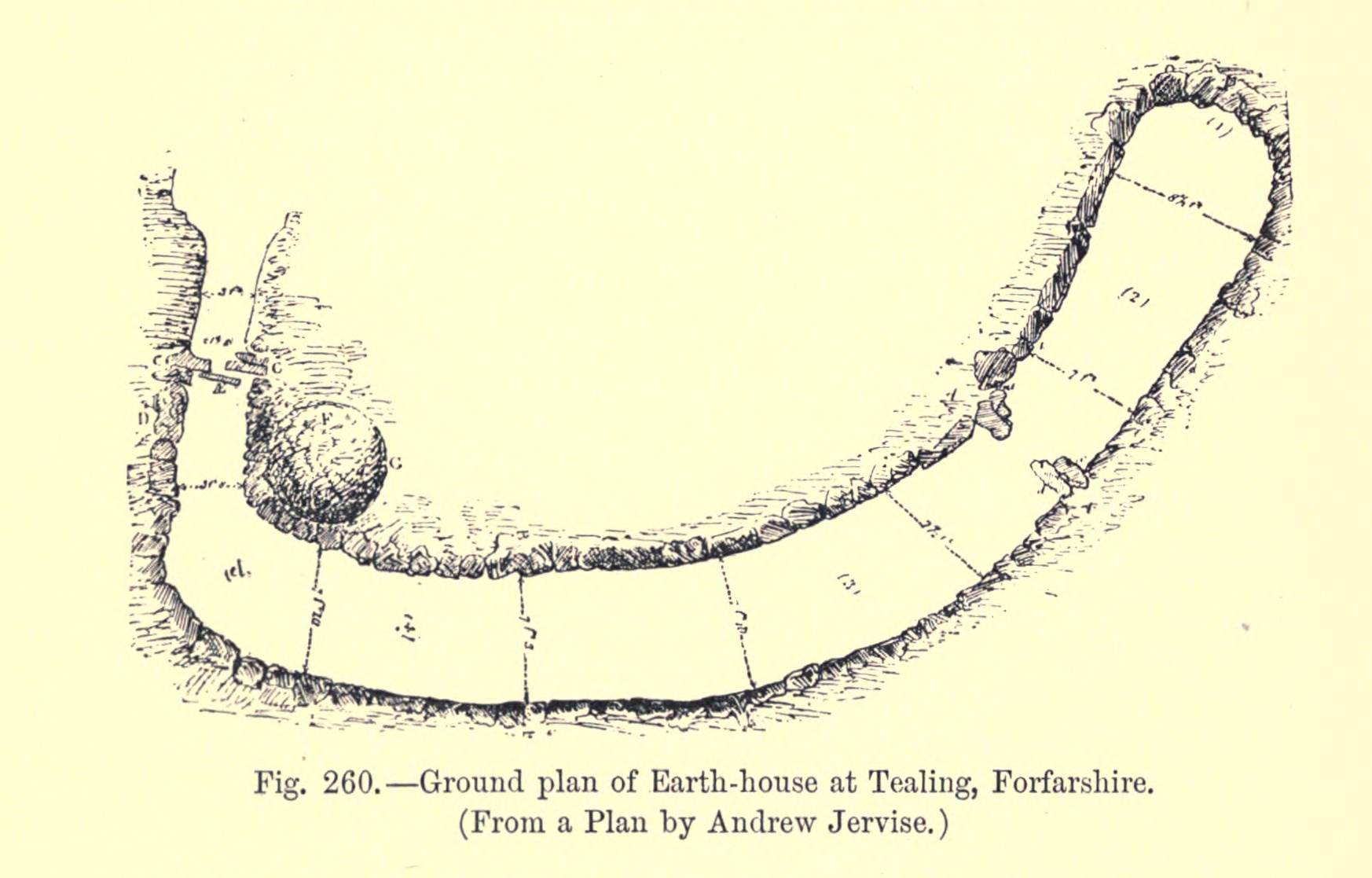
Illustration of Tealing Earth House's footprint

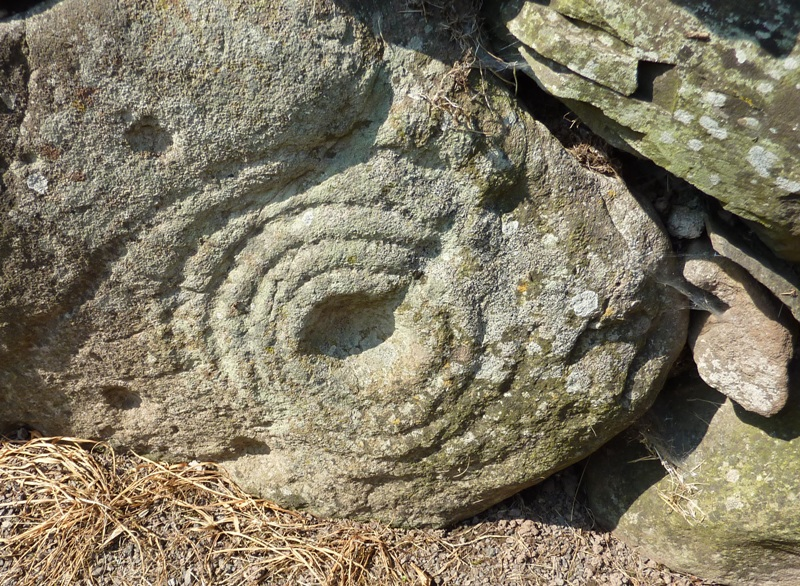
Bronze Age cup and ring marked stone used to construct the wall

== History ==
In 1871 the souterrain was discovered by a farmer during ploughing of the field. Three years later in 1874 the site was excavated by antiquarian Andrew Jervise.

It was discovered that the chamber was composed of a series of compartments and would have been roofed by stone slabs. There was also a room at the end of the chamber formed by two upright slabs. Two Bronze Age cup and ring marked stones were used in the construction of the walls. There was also several finds including animal bones, native pottery sherds, 10 quern-stones and Roman glass and pottery.

In the 1970s the repair and consolidation work was performed on the souterrain to maintain the structure. This has altered the original architecture of the souterrain.

== See also ==
- Carlungie and Ardestie earthhouses
- Scheduled monuments in Angus
- List of Historic Environment Scotland properties
