= Endel Puusepp =

Estonian pilot in Soviet service

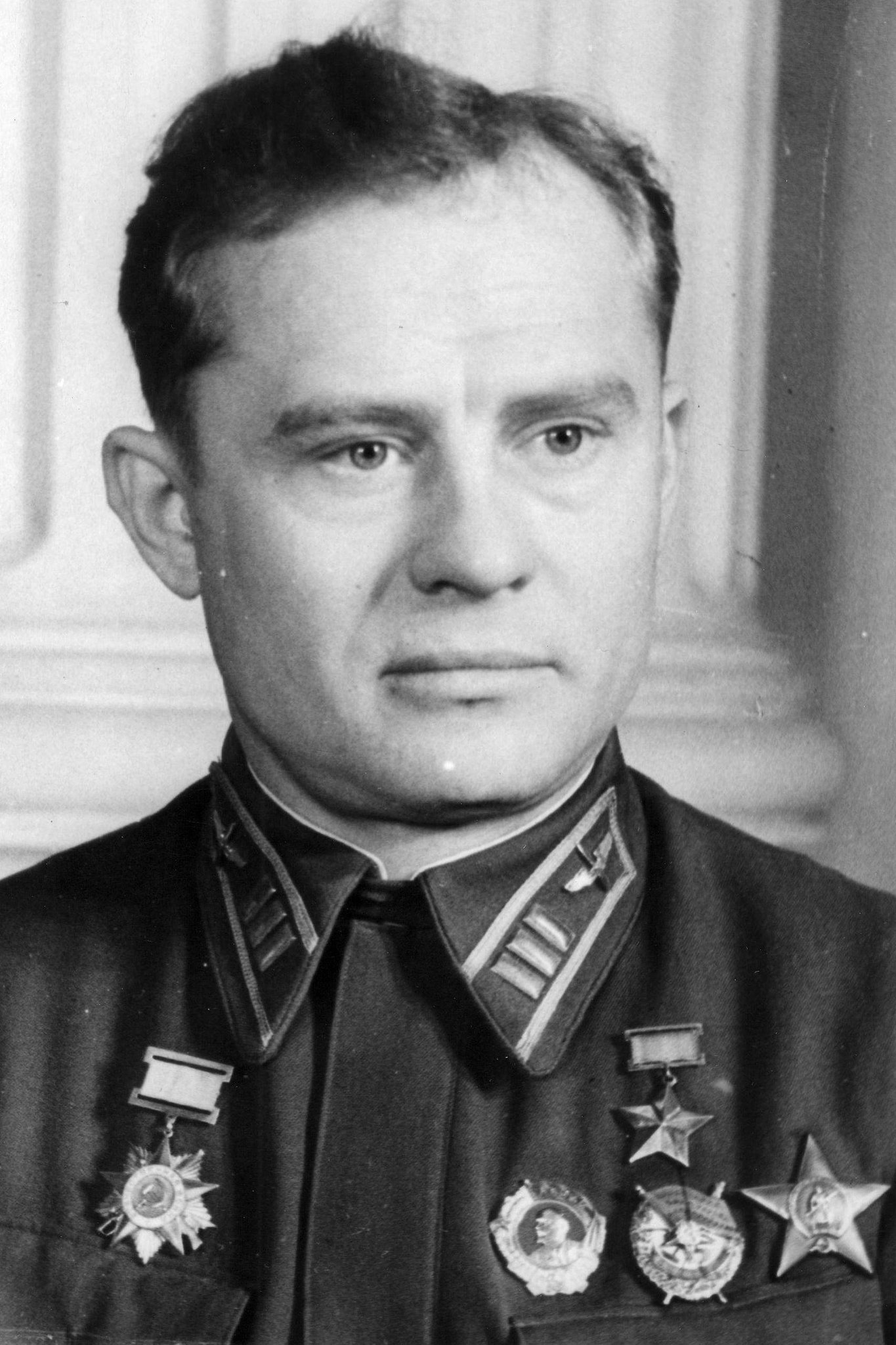
- Endel Puusepp c. 1942–1943.
- Born: 1 May 1909; Samovolny farm, Yeniseysk Governorate, Russian Empire
- Died: 18 January 1996 (aged 86); Tallinn, Estonia
- Military career
- Allegiance: Soviet Union
- Branch: Soviet Air Force
- Rank: Colonel
- Awards: Hero of the Soviet Union

Endel Karlovich Puusepp (Russian: Эндель Карлович Пусэп; 1 May 1909 – 18 June 1996) was a Soviet bomber pilot of Estonian origin who completed over 30 nighttime strategic bombing campaigns during World War II. He was a recipient of the Hero of the Soviet Union award for flying a high-ranking delegation over the front line from Moscow to Washington, D.C., and back to negotiate the opening of the Western Front.

== Early life ==
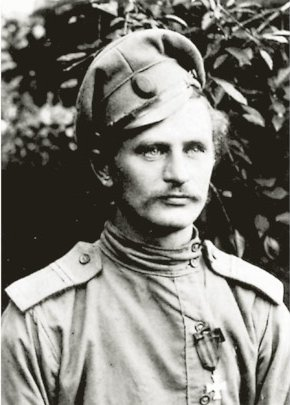
Endel's father Karl, a recipient of the Cross of St. George

Endel Puusepp was born into a family of Estonian peasants who had settled in Yeniseysk Governorate, Siberia, during the Stolypin land reform. Ever since early childhood, Puusepp dreamed of becoming a pilot. His parents, however, envisaged a different career for him: either a teacher or an agronomist. Having completed 7 grades of school, Puusepp moved to Leningrad to study at the Estonian-Finnish Teachers' College.

== Aviation career ==
After completing one year of studies at the teacher's college, Puusepp transferred to a pilot's school, first in Volsk and later in Orenburg. He stayed at the latter as a flight instructor, having graduated. He was later transferred to a newly formed squadron specializing in instrument and night flying.

=== Polar aviation ===
By 1938, Puusepp was an established pilot, proficient in instrument flying. Even earlier, he participated in the operation to locate the plane of Sigizmund Levanevsky, which disappeared in the Arctic. The North captivated Puusepp so much that he decided to stay and work there. He flew to the ice station North Pole-1 on several occasions and visited other Soviet Arctic stations. He was also involved in creating optimal routes for ships and in observing the movements of ice. While on one of these missions over the Kara Sea, Puusepp learned about the onset of the Operation Barbarossa. Having landed, Puusepp requested a transfer to the front line.

=== World War II ===
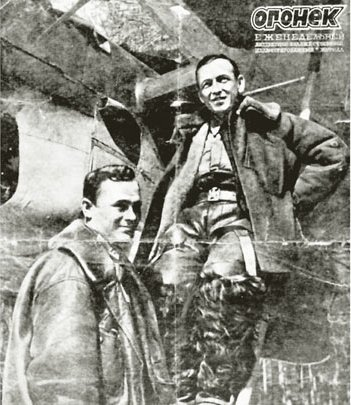
Puusepp (left) on the cover of the magazine Ogoniok

On August 8, 1941, under the command of Mikhail Vodopyanov, Puusepp participated in his first bombing mission. After a successful air raid on Berlin, his airplane was heavily damaged by anti-aircraft artillery and resulting in an emergency landing in Estonia, then occupied by the Nazis. Upon exiting the plane, the crew encountered a frightened shepherd boy. Puusepp, who did not forget his native Estonian was able to find out the location of the Nazi troops from him and avoid being captured, safely returning to Soviet-controlled territory. By April 1942, Puusepp completed 30 nighttime strategic bombing missions against Berlin, Danzig, and Königsberg.

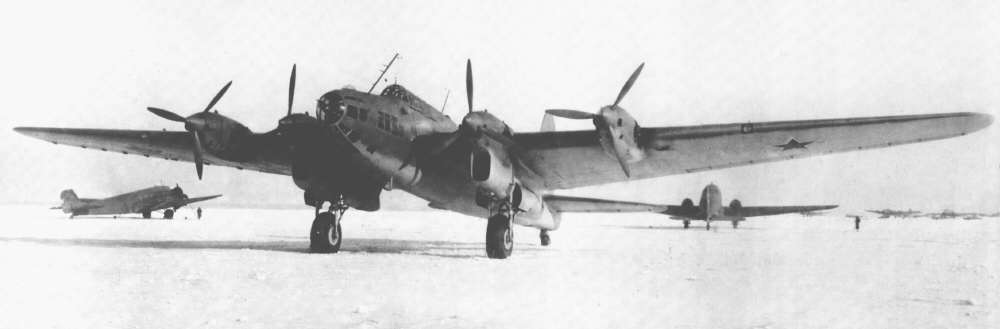
Soviet heavy bomber Petlyakov Pe-8.

By that time, the Soviet Union was involved in negotiations with the Allies concerning the opening of the Western front. It was decided to send a Soviet delegation headed by the Foreign Minister Vyacheslav Molotov, first to Great Britain and then to the United States. Puusepp was chosen to be the pilot for this unprecedented and highly risky operation, involving flying over the front line and enemy-controlled territories. On May 29, 1942, after stopping in Tealing, Prestwick, Reykjavík, and Goose Bay, the Petlyakov Pe-8 plane with the Soviet delegation on board landed in Washington. Returning home was even more perilous. Puusepp feared the Nazis were aware of the completed negotiations, and would intend to intercept the delegation on its way back. A ruse was employed involving reports published by the Soviet press, announcing the successful return of the Soviet delegation. It was only after this act of disinformation that the airplane set course for Moscow. For successful completion of the mission, Puusepp was given the honorary title Hero of the Soviet Union.

He continued strategic bombing missions in Stalingrad, Kursk, Oryol, and Belgorod. During one of the missions, Puusepp sustained a shrapnel injury of his spine and had to undergo five surgeries. He never fully recovered and retired from the Soviet Air Forces in 1946 at the rank of colonel.

== Later years ==
After the war, Puusepp moved to Tallinn, where he was appointed head of the Central Board of Road Transport of the Estonian SSR. In 1950, he was elected Vice Chairman of the Supreme Soviet of the Estonian SSR and later worked as Minister of Social Insurance of the republic.

Endel Puusepp died on 18 June 1996. He is buried at the Metsakalmistu cemetery in Tallinn.
