= Wildwood House (publisher) =

Publishing company founded in London, England, in 1972

Wildwood House was a book publishing company in London, England, founded in 1972 by Oliver Caldecott and Dieter Pevsner, who had both worked at Penguin Books, leaving to set up the new publishing venture. The company was based in Floral Street, Covent Garden. Wildwood House published "an eclectic list that included JP Donleavy and Studs Terkel. Wildwood also introduced Garry Trudeau's Doonesbury cartoon strips to the UK by publishing The People's Doonesbury in 1981, and acted as an early distribution outlet for Virago, the feminist publishing house."

== Personal life ==
Oliver Caldecott (1925–1989), who had been chief editor of fiction at Penguin, was married to writer Moyra Caldecott and they had three children. Dieter Pevsner (1932–2019), whose father was architectural historian Sir Nikolaus Pevsner, had been editorial director in charge of Penguin's non-fiction Pelican editions, and had three children with his wife Florence.
