= Pictish Beast =

Creature represented on Pictish monuments

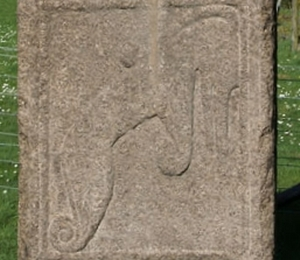
Maiden Stone, detail of eastern face

Line drawing of Pictish beast

The Pictish Beast (sometimes Pictish Dragon or Pictish Elephant) is a conventional representation of an animal, distinct to the early medieval culture of the Picts of Scotland. The great majority of surviving examples are on Pictish stones.

The Pictish Beast accounts for about 40% of all Pictish animal depictions, and so was likely of great importance.

== Depiction on stones ==
A comprehensive collection of depictions of the Pictish Beast was given by John Stuart as Plate 22 in Sculptured Stones of Scotland Volume 2, 1867. Depictions are shown at a consistent scale and oriented as they were on the stones. The sequence in which they appear is described as

indicating their development from the outline form in which they first appear on the rude pillars, to that in which the outline is filled up with the ornamental devices of the cross-slabs

The orientation of the beast's back on Stuart's Plate 22 is predominantly horizontal, or slightly inclined; only on the Maiden Stone and at Dunfallandy is it at 45° and on Meigle 5 vertical. The last may be explained by its position on the stone: it is on the narrow left side, where it occupies 90% of the available width. One omission from Stuart's plate is the symbol in the Doo Cave at East Wemyss, recorded by Anderson in 1881. Anderson described it as "the symbolic animal, with the long jaws and the crest and the scroll-like feet". Absent from the Doo Cave figure is the crest from the top of the beast's head and the tail; the rear scroll-like feet are clearly divided into two limbs.

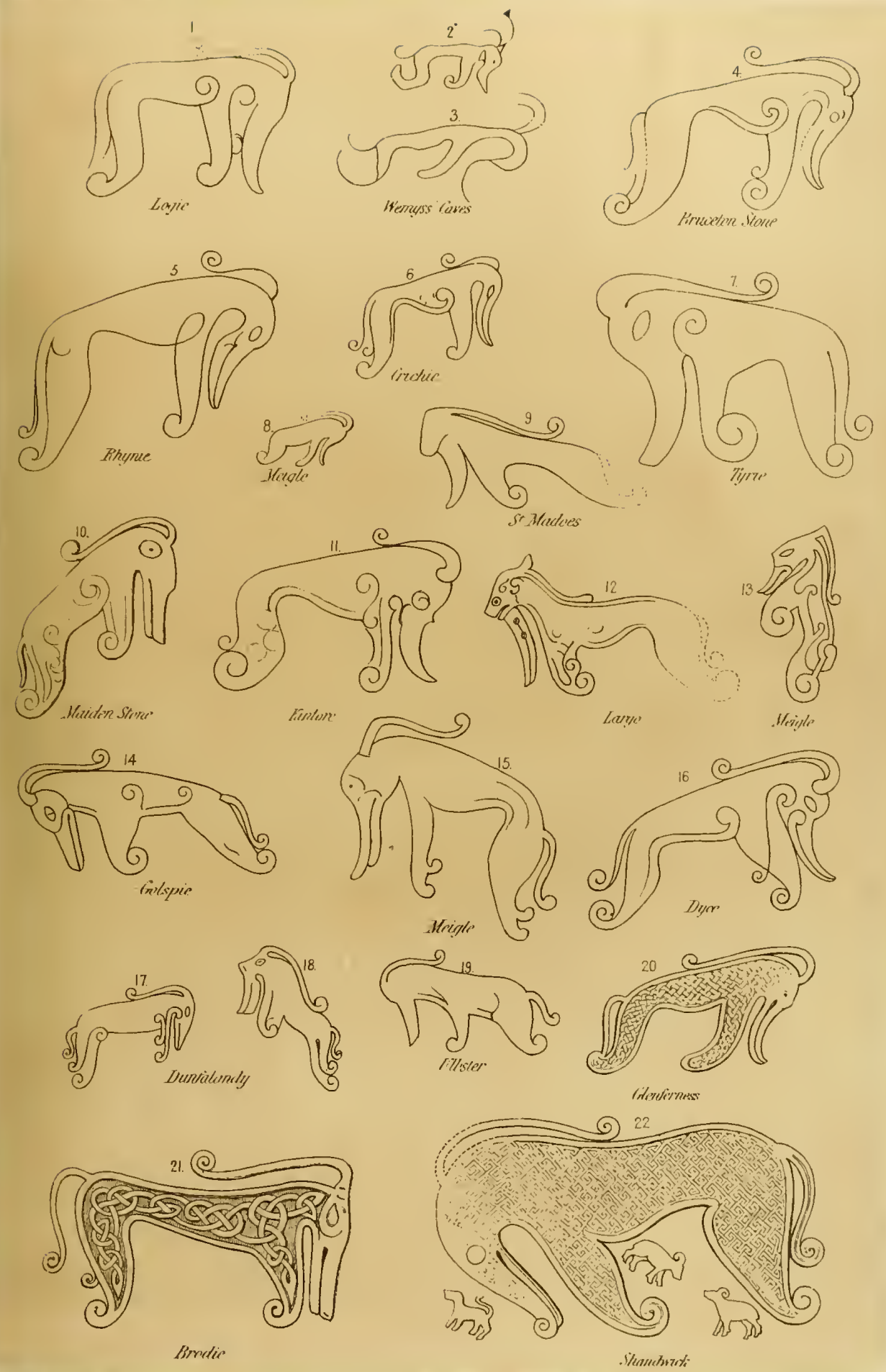
Plate showing Pictish Beast from Stuart: Sculptured Stones of Scotland Vol 2, 1867

== Interpretation ==
In the Historic Scotland guidebook The Picts, Jill Harden writes:

... most common of all [the animal symbols] is the Pictish beast. This intriguing figure is clearly swimming. Is it a porpoise, a dolphin or a creature of myth?

Cetaceans are present along the east coast of Scotland. Chanonry Point and the Sutors of Cromarty lie close to the Pictish monasteries at Portmahomack and Rosemarkie and are recognised as some of the best sites in Britain for viewing bottlenose dolphins from the land.

One characteristic of cetaceans is their blowhole (one for dolphins, porpoises and beaked whales; two for baleen whales). When cetaceans reach the water surface to breathe, they expel air through the blowhole. Water vapour in the exhalation condenses, producing a visible spout which trails behind the cetacean as it moves forward. This has a similar appearance to the crest from the head of the Pictish beast.

Other suggested identifications of the Pictish beast have included an elephant, a kelpie (or each uisge), and a seahorse.

The Pictish beast has also been termed a 'swimming elephant' and may have been modelled on a particularly complex example on a stone at Golspie, which incorporates all the stylistic and anatomical elements found in other variants of the symbol. These defining features include the tucked-in head, a line running from the back to the top of the nose, scrolled joints and spiralled feet.

Whatever its origin, its presence on many Christian stones and its position on them implies that, as with the crescent and V-rod, it had by then acquired a Christian meaning which appealed to those erecting the stones, e.g. salvation.

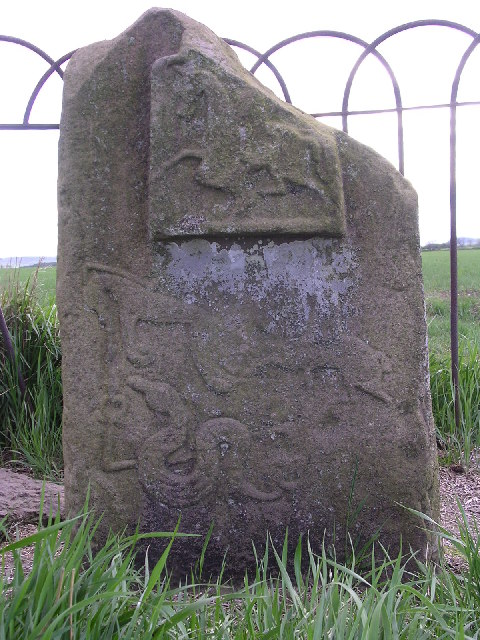
St Martin's stone

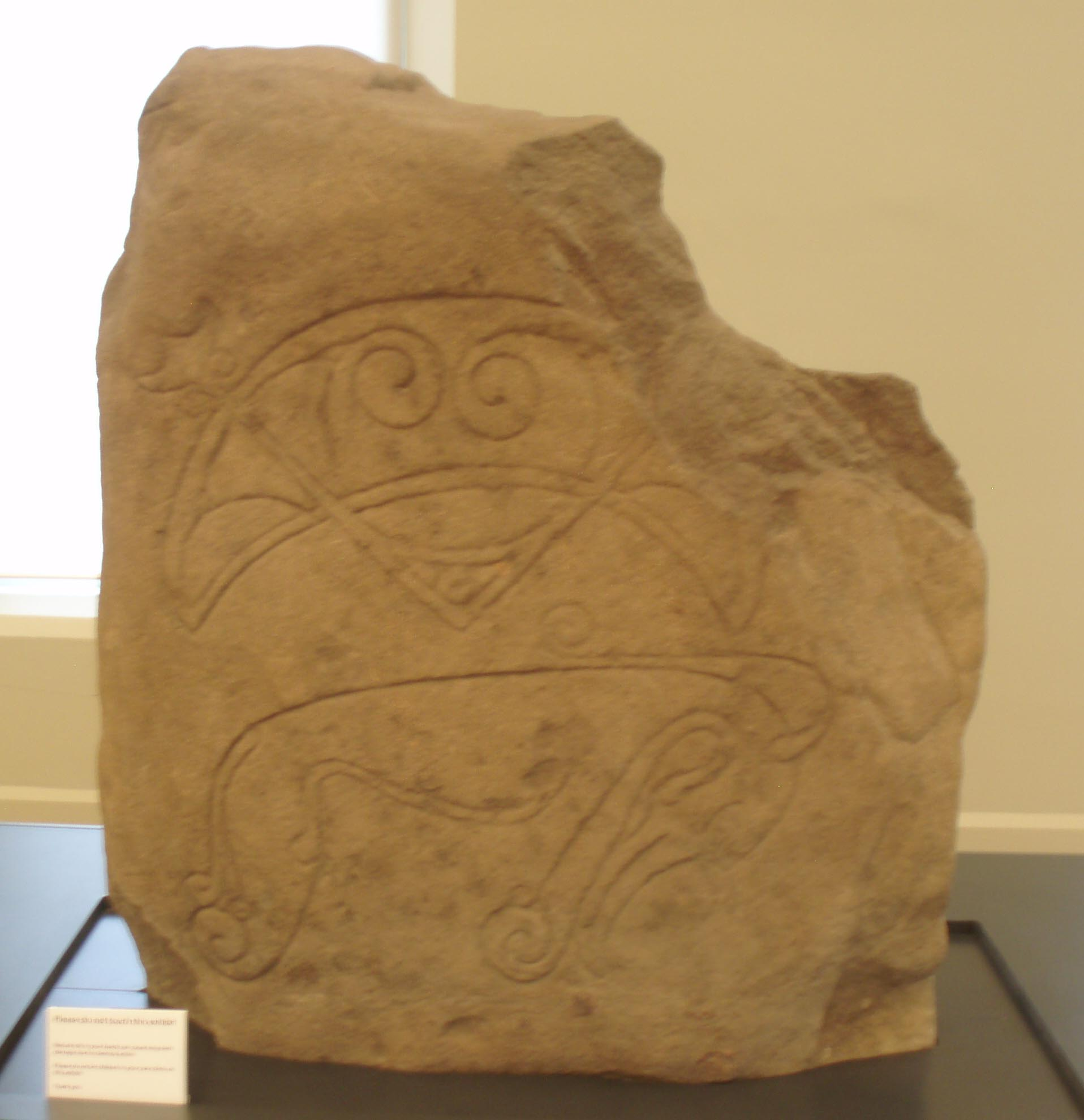
Strathmartine Castle Stone

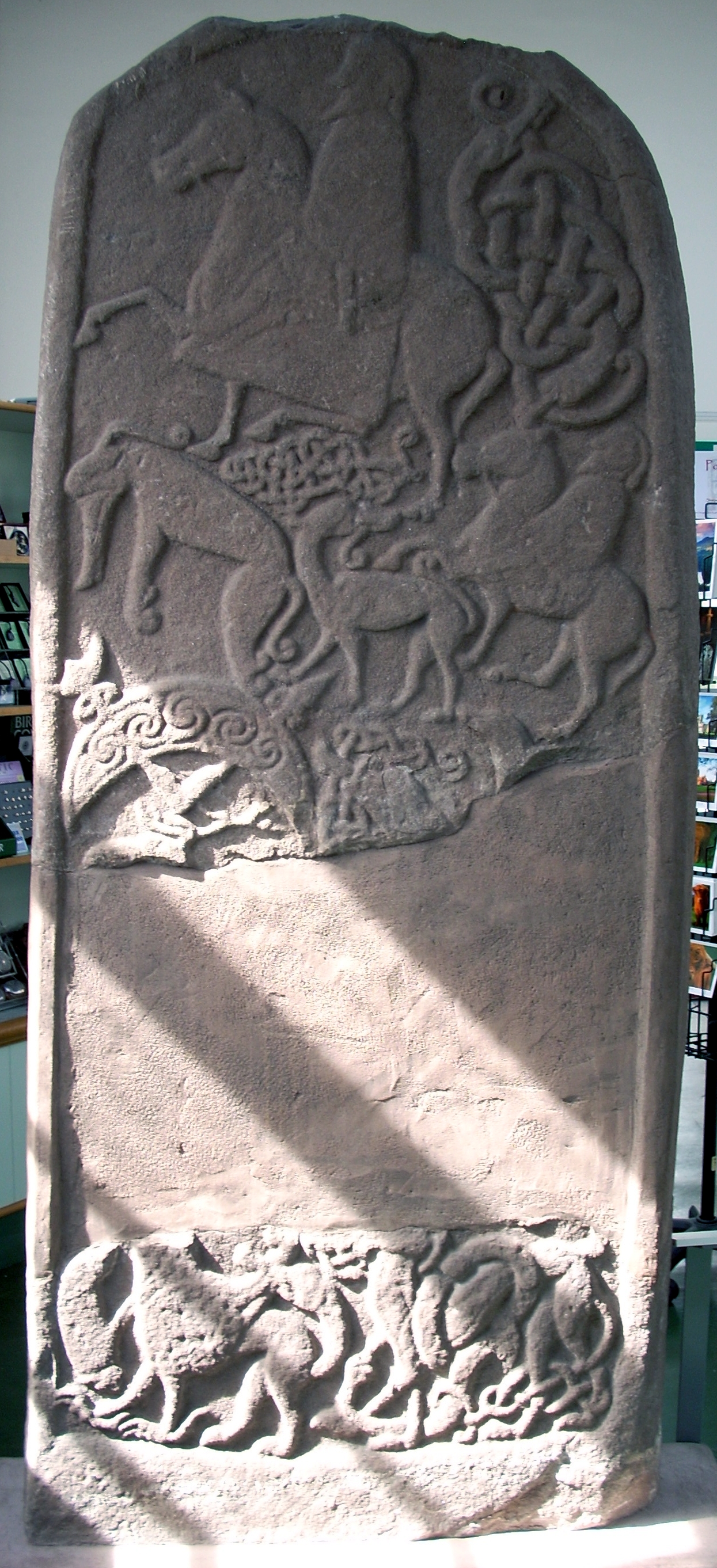
Meigle 4

== See also ==
- Celtic art § Picts
- Loch Ness Monster – a mythical sea monster from the Scottish Highlands
- Kelpie – a mythical spirit from Scotland that may take the form of a water monster
- Set animal – an unidentified animal in Ancient Egyptian art

== Bibliography ==
- Jones, Duncan (2003). A Wee Guide to the Picts. Musselburgh.
- Cessford, Craig (June 2005). "Pictish art and the sea". The Heroic Age: A Journal of Medieval Northwestern Europe (8). ISSN 1526-1867.
