= Culsh Earth House =

Souterrain in Aberdeenshire, Scotland

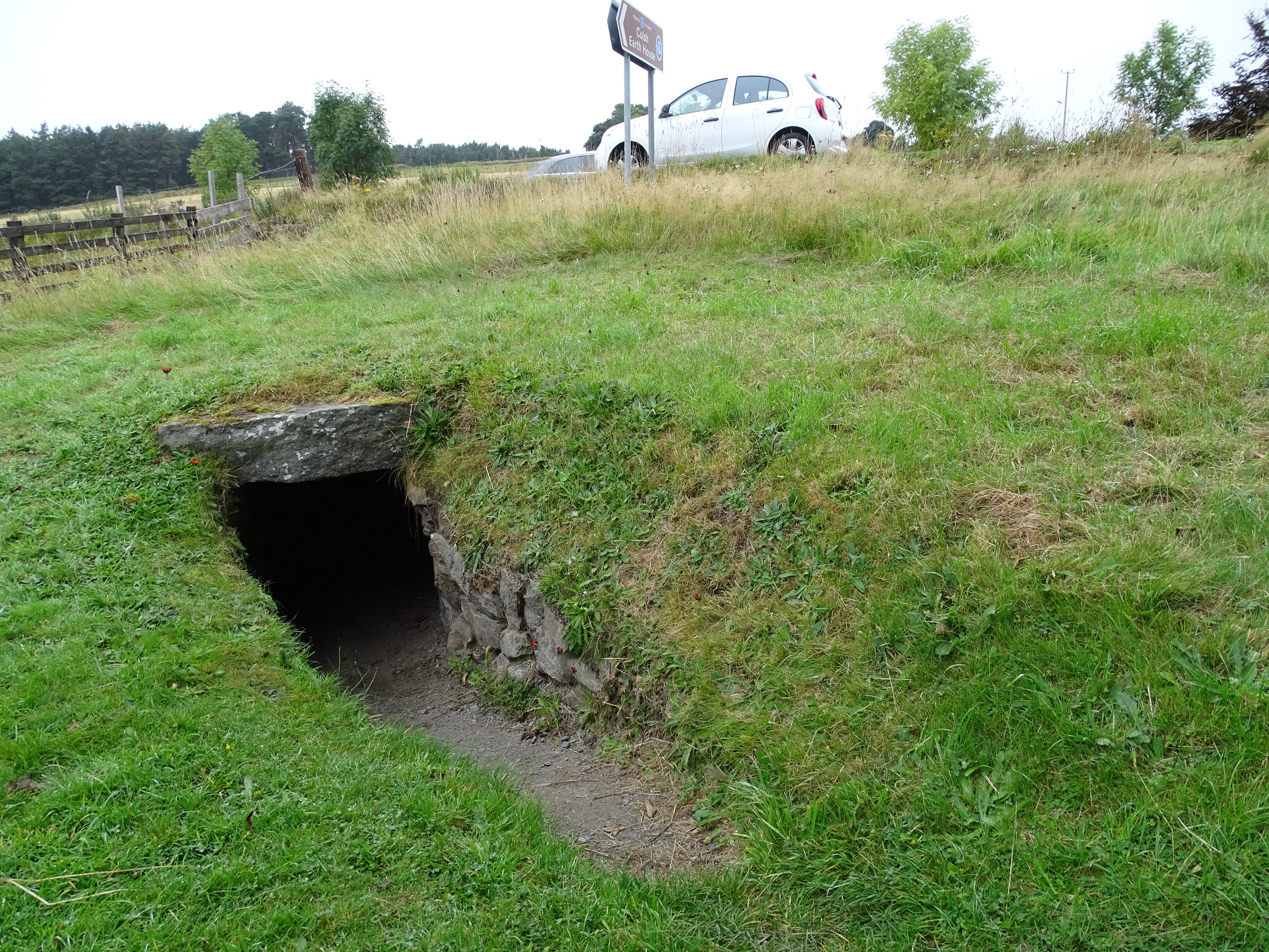
- Entrance to Culsh Earth House
- Interactive map of Culsh Earth House
- 57.1376°N 2.8197°W
- Type: Souterrain
- Location: Aberdeenshire, Scotland

Site notes
- Material: Stone
- Length: 14.5 m (48 ft)
- Management: Historic Environment Scotland
- Public access: Yes
- Website: Historic Environment Scotland

Scheduled monument
- Official name: Culsh, Souterrain
- Type: Prehistoric domestic and defensive: souterrain, earth-house
- Designated: 23 May 1994
- Reference no.: SM90091

Culsh Earth House is an Iron Age souterrain in Aberdeenshire, Scotland. It is named after Culsh farmsteading nearby, which is still in use to the present day. The site is near the village of Tarland.

Culsh Earth House has a Statement of Significance from Historic Environment Scotland.

== Description ==
The Culsh Earth House dates from around the year zero. The underground construction probably served as a storage place.

The souterrain is simple in design and well preserved, complete with flat stone ceiling. The Earth House consists of a curved hallway. From the entrance, the corridor continues straight and then bends to the right. The total length of the corridor is roughly 14.5 meters. At the end the corridor is slightly wider and higher than the rest of the corridor.
