= Dounby Click Mill =

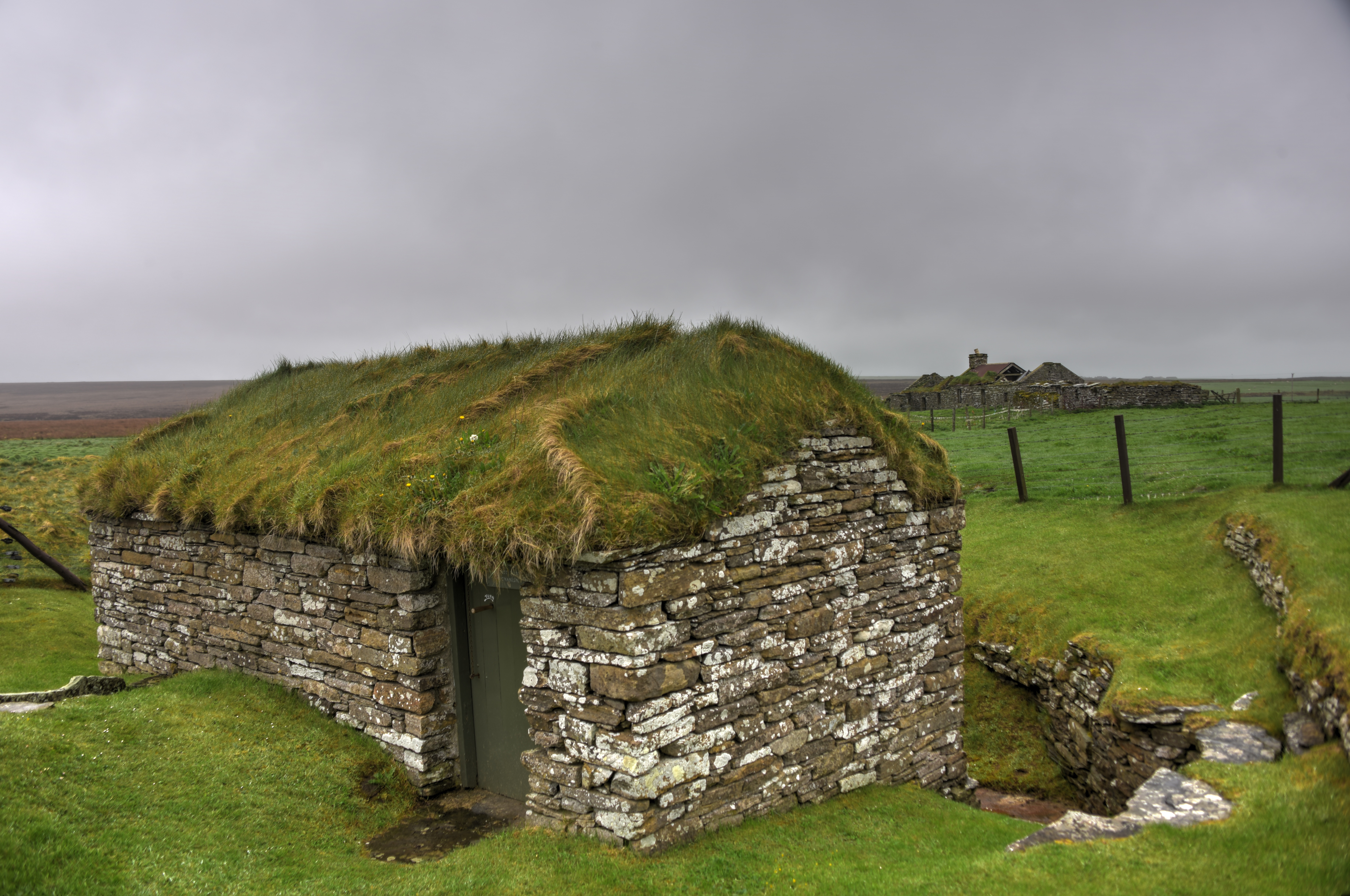

- Location within Orkney Islands
- 59°05′14″N 3°10′44″W
- Type: Watermill
- Location: Dounby
- OS grid reference: HY 32541 22853

History
- Built: 19th Century

Site notes
- Area: Mainland, Orkney
- Owner: Historic Environment Scotland

Scheduled monument
- Official name: Click Mill
- Designated: 31 May 1994
- Reference no.: SM90076

Dounby Click Mill is a mill located on the Mainland of Orkney, in Scotland. It is the last of the horizontal or "Norse" watermills of Orkney still in working order.

The mill is constructed with drystone walls and roofed with flagstones and turf. The design avoids the use of complicated gearing to transfer the drive to the millstones by mounting the stones directly above the wheel and on the same shaft.

It has been restored by, and is owned by, Historic Environment Scotland.

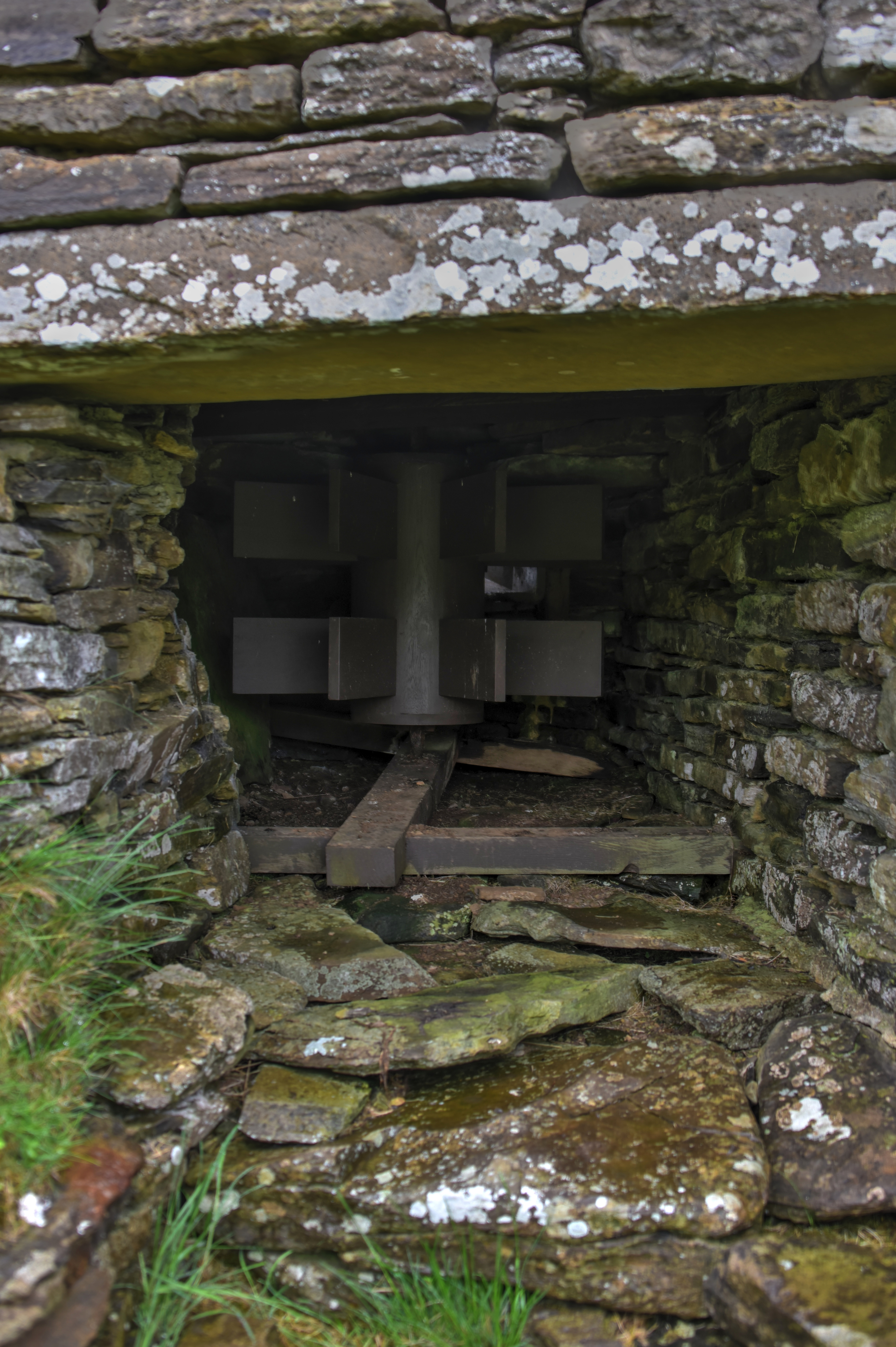
Horizontal water wheel of Dounby Click Mill
