= Tormiston Mill =

Coordinates: 58.9946°N 3.1864°W

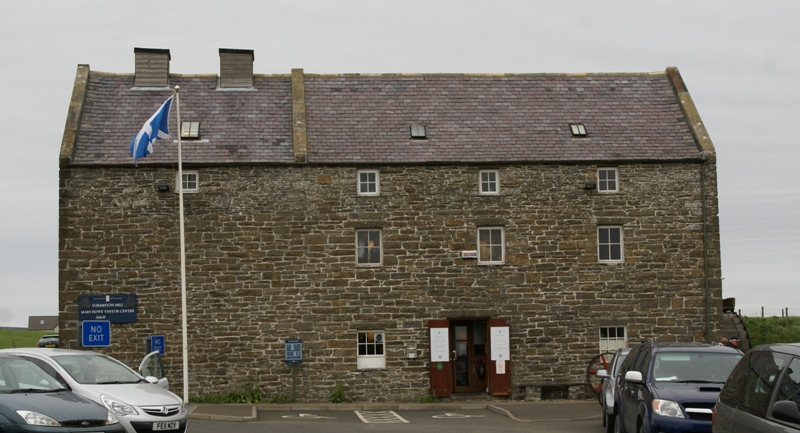
- Tormiston Mill in 2011 as the Maeshowe Visitor Centre

- Location within Orkney Islands
- Type: Watermill (1882–1962); Visitor Centre (1989–2016)
- Location: Stenness

History
- Built: 1882

Site notes
- Area: Mainland, Orkney
- Owner: Historic Environment Scotland

Tormiston Mill is a Category B listed watermill located on the Mainland of Orkney, in Scotland, owned by Historic Scotland since 1989. The mill sits adjacent to Maeshowe Chambered Cairn.

== History ==
=== Watermill (1882–1962) ===
Tormiston Mill was built in 1884/5 by Colonel Balfour of Shapinsay, and became operational shortly after. Many of the original mill mechanisms have been preserved inside. The mill is a large, rectangular building with three floors and originally a small attic until it was stripped out during asbestos removal in the 2010s. It was powered by three pairs of grinding stones driven by a cast iron, 8 spoke water wheel, 4 feet (1.2 m) wide with a 14 feet (4.3 m) diameter. Tormiston was not a flour mill, but instead processed grain, peas and beans for animal feed, as well as coarse bere and oatmeal for bread or porridge. Tormiston Mill served the parish of Stenness until 1962 when it finally ceased production. After the mill closed, it became a restaurant and shop in 1972, winning a European Architectural Heritage Award in 1975.

=== Maeshowe Visitor Centre (1989–2016) ===
Tormiston Mill was purchased by Historic Scotland in 1989, and because of the building's close proximity to Maeshowe Chambered Cairn, it became the ticket office and gift shop of Maeshowe. A cafe was located on the second floor until the end of the 2004 tourist season. Tormiston Mill had no wheelchair access to the gift shop on the first floor, and there were concerns about the asbestos located within the roof of the building. As safety concerns grew revolving around the carpark's close proximity with the A965 road, a crash outside the mill finally led to the close of the mill as a visitor centre in September 2016. Tours from Maeshowe operated via shuttle bus from the Skara Brae visitor centre in Sandwick until a new Maeshowe visitor centre opened in Stenness Village in April 2017. Tormiston Mill was officially condemned for Historic Scotland regular staff use in 2020, and by 2024 was no longer accessible to staff, however it is still owned by Historic Environment Scotland. The mill is a category B listed building.
