= Drumcoltran Tower =

Castle near Dumfries, Scotland

- Near Kirkgunzeon, Dumfries and Galloway, Scotland; UK grid reference NX869682
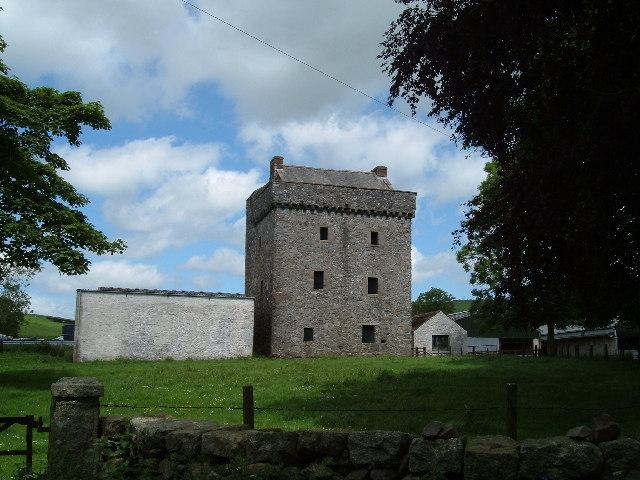
- The tower in 2005

Site information
- Type: L-Plan Tower house
- Owner: Historic Scotland
- Open to the public: Yes
- Condition: Preserved

Location
- Coordinates: 54.995902°N 3.767361°W

Site history
- Built: Late 16th Century
- Materials: Stone

Scheduled monument
- Official name: Drumcoltran Castle (Tower)
- Type: Secular: castle; tower
- Designated: 31 May 1928
- Reference no.: SM90100

Drumcoltran Tower is a late-16th-century tower house situated in the historical county of Kirkcudbrightshire near Kirkgunzeon, Dumfries and Galloway.

Like other towers in the area, Drumcoltran was built by a branch of the Maxwell family around 1570 but passed with the estate to the Irvings in 1668. The Maxwells however constructed the existing farm steading and made alterations to the interior of the tower in the 18th century.

It was designated a scheduled monument in 1928.
