= Torr a'Chaisteal =

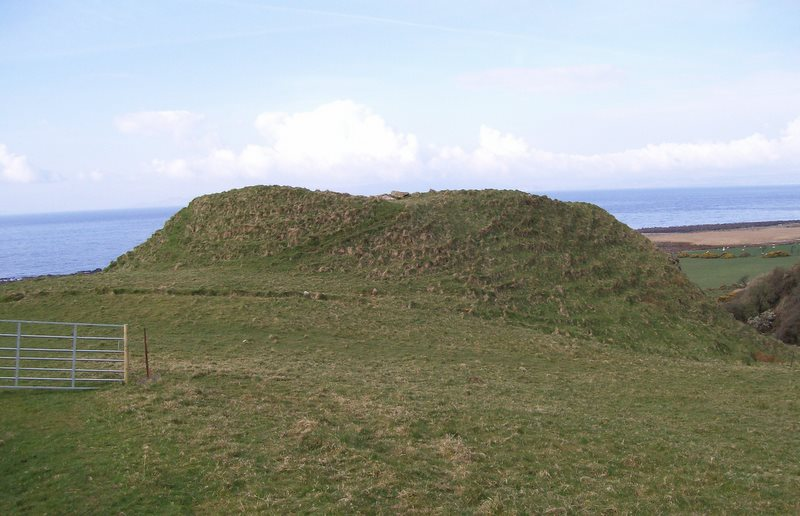
- Torr a'Chaisteal

- Shown on Arran
- 55°27′32″N 5°17′19″W
- Type: Dun
- Periods: Iron Age
- Location: Isle of Arran

Site notes
- Owner: Historic Scotland
- Public access: Yes

Torr a'Chaisteal (or Torr a'Chaisteil) is an Iron Age fort (dun), located about 1 mile (2 kilometres) northeast of the village of Sliddery, on the Isle of Arran in Scotland (grid reference NR92172326).

== Description ==
Torr a'Chaisteal is situated on an isolated grassy knoll on the west coast of Arran.

It was a fortified residence, or dun, of a type common across western Scotland in the later Iron Age. A similar structure can be seen at Kilpatrick Dun 2 1/2 mi (4 km) to the north. The turf-covered walls are 0.5 metres high and have an average width of 4 metres. The walls are formed of large sandstone boulders, enclosing an area with a diameter of around 7 metres. A short stretch of wall lies beside the dun to the east, while on the landward approach is a substantial earthwork that may have formed an outer defence.

Antiquarian excavations in the 19th century uncovered human and animal bones, shells, the top stone of a quern, and pieces of haematite iron.
