= Tealing =

Coordinates: 56.5329°N 2.9640°W

Tealing Tèalainn
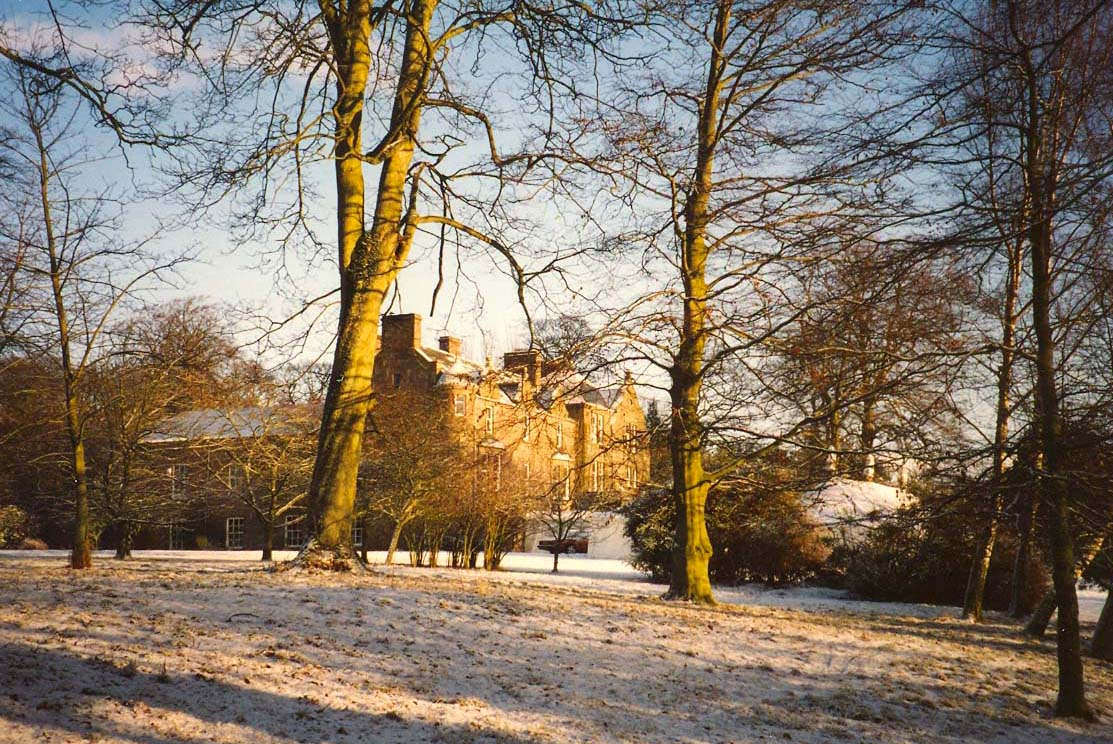
- Balmuir House, 18th century with Victorian additions

- Location within Angus
- OS grid reference: NO408383
- Council area: Angus
- Lieutenancy area: Angus
- Country: Scotland
- Sovereign state: United Kingdom
- Post town: DUNDEE
- Postcode district: DD4
- Dialling code: 01382
- Police: Scotland
- Fire: Scottish
- Ambulance: Scottish
- UK Parliament: Dundee East
- Scottish Parliament: Angus South

Tealing (Scottish Gaelic: Tèalainn) is a village in Angus in eastern Scotland, nestled at the foot of the Sidlaw Hills. It is just 6 miles (9.7 km) north of the city of Dundee and 8 miles (13 km) south of Forfar. With a population of just over 700 people living in 347 households scattered across 15 square miles (39 km^{2}) of fertile farming land, it has several large working farms blended with comfortable family homes forming part of the Dundee and Angus commuter belt. There is an old stone-built, but thriving little primary school with about 50 pupils at any one time and a further 10 youngsters attending the nursery school on the same site.

Tealing's picturesque, slumbering, peaceful and idyllic setting belies its colourful past. Its history includes prehistoric settlement, ancient carvings, Picts, religious rebellion, World War intrigue, agricultural upheaval and community survival.

There is evidence of an early Pictish settlement around 100 AD near a soutterain now known as the Tealing Earth House. The first church in Tealing was built in 710 AD by St Boniface, the papal missionary who founded around 150 churches in the north-east of Scotland. In 1728, the Reverend John Glas of Tealing Parish Church was suspended and formed a breakaway church known as the Glasites. Almost 1,300 years of local worship came to an end in 1982 when the congregation of Tealing Church combined with the Murroes church. The church still stands and the small graveyard, which is still in use, has remains dating back to the 17th century.

== Tealing Airfield ==
In 1942, during the Second World War, the Ministry of Defence built an aerodrome in Tealing which also found use in wartime as a Prisoner of War camp. No.56 Officer Training Unit opened in March 1942, equipped with Hurricane, Master and Lysander aircraft. The number of pilots training at the unit varied from about 35 to 40 in 1942, reaching a peak of 150 in 1943.

It was at the aerodrome that Tealing's most famous visitor arrived. On 20 May 1942, a strange four-engined aircraft appeared in the circuit at Tealing, piloted by Endel Puusepp. It was one of the first Russian TB7s to visit Britain and it brought Vyacheslav Molotov, Russian Foreign Minister and Deputy Chairman of the State Committee of Defence, on a military mission to meet Sir Winston Churchill at Chequers. Tealing airfield was probably chosen to attract as little attention as possible and, for security reasons, there was a local news blackout at the time.

Molotov was given the choice of two aircraft in which to continue his journey to England. The one he did not select, as later revealed by Sir Archibald Philip Hope, 17th Baronet, Senior Controller of Fighter Command in Scotland in 1942, crashed in the Vale of York, killing various members of Molotov's staff and senior RAF personnel. Molotov arrived safely in London for the signing of the Anglo-Soviet Treaty on 26 May 1942.

== Sir William Stewart Duke-Elder ==
Sir William Stewart Duke-Elder, GCVO, DSc, LLD, MD, PhD, FRCP, FRCS, FRS[1] (22 April 1898 — 27 March 1978), was born in Tealing. Duke-Elder's father was the Tealing Free Church Minister, the Reverend Neil Elder. Duke-Elder became a dominant force in British and world ophthalmology for more than a quarter of a century. In 1932 he operated on the then Prime Minister, Ramsay MacDonald, for glaucoma. He was knighted in 1933 and subsequently earned many more honours, serving as the Surgeon-Oculist to King Edward VIII, George VI and Queen Elizabeth II. His obituary in the British Medical Journal described him as "a warm-hearted and friendly Scot, with his charming smile and puckish sense of humour he would at once put strangers at their ease."
