= Kilpatrick Dun =

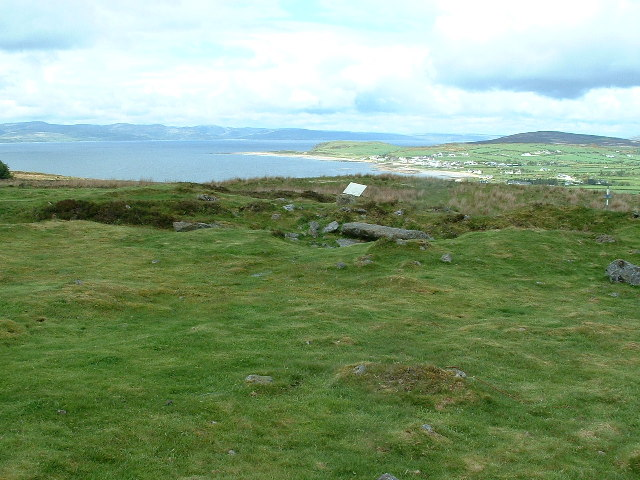
- Kilpatrick Dun

- Shown on Arran
- 55°29′05″N 5°18′53″W
- Type: Dun
- Periods: Iron Age
- Location: Isle of Arran

Site notes
- Owner: Historic Scotland
- Public access: Yes

Kilpatrick Dun is an Iron Age dun, located about 1 mile (2 kilometres) south of the village of Blackwaterfoot on the Isle of Arran in Scotland (grid reference NR90652619).

== Description ==
Kilpatrick Dun is situated on level ground on a northwesterly hill-slope. It can be reached via a short walk from a small car park. The site is not well understood. In the past it has been proposed that it was a Bronze Age burial cairn or the site of an early Christian monastery. However, it is now generally thought that the site was a fortified residence, or dun, of a type common across the western Scotland in the later Iron Age. A similar structure can be seen at the Torr a'Chaisteal dun 2 1/2 mi (4 km) to the south.

The circular dun measures 17 metres in diameter, within a wall more than 8 metres thick in places. The entrance, 1.2 metres wide, is from the south. There are four chambers visible in the wall thickness.

The dun is surrounded by a large enclosure. The enclosure is similar to the cashel of an early Christian monastery, but the small rectangular structures built against the enclosure bank, on the far side from the dun, make more sense as a post-medieval croft or bothy.
