= Auchagallon Stone Circle =

- Auchengallon Cairn
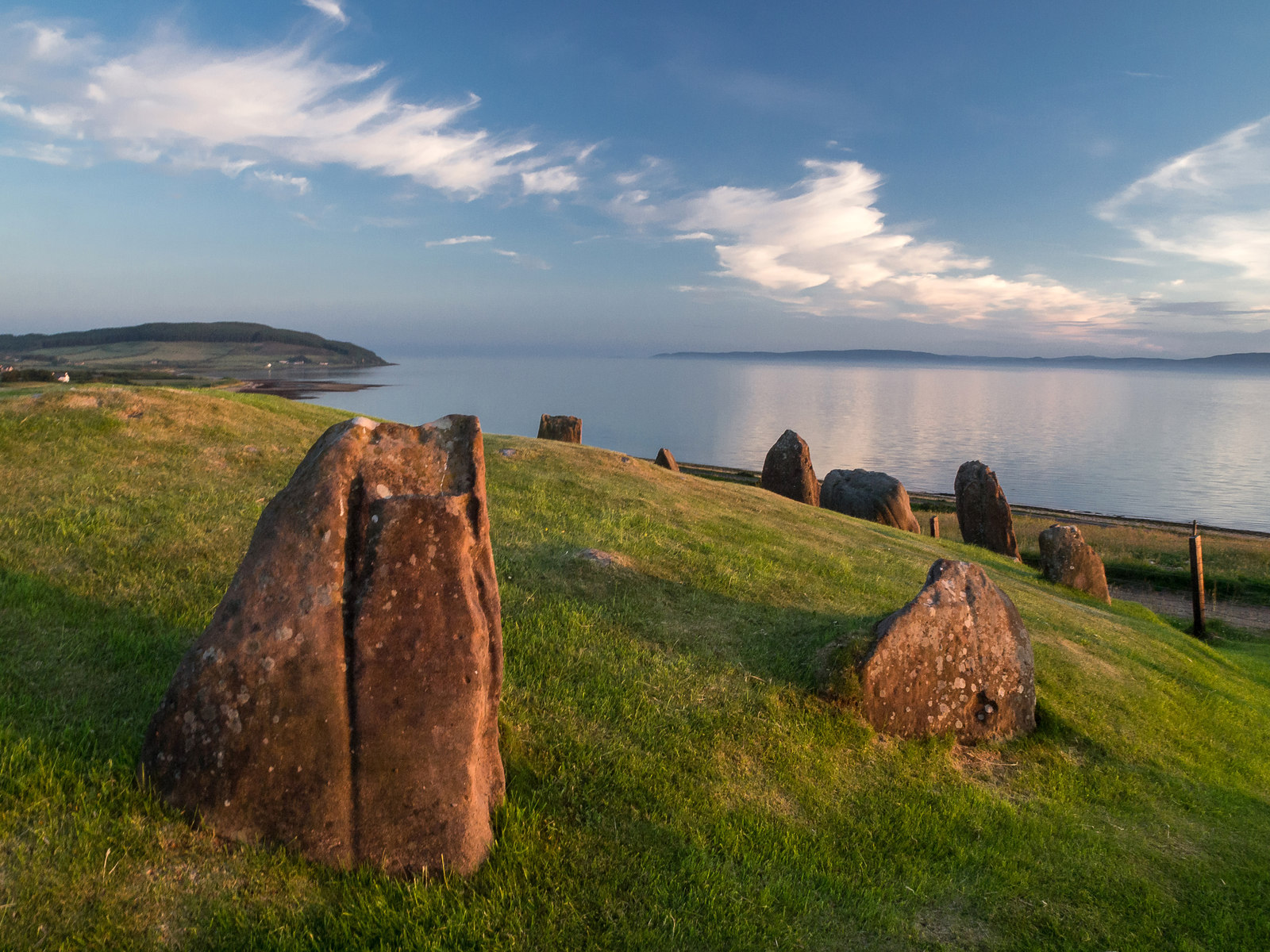
- Auchagallon Stone Circle
- Interactive map of Auchagallon Stone Circle
- 55.559789°N 5.342810°W
- Type: Kerbed burial cairn
- Periods: Neolithic / Bronze Age
- Location: Isle of Arran

Site notes
- Owner: Historic Environment Scotland
- Public access: Yes

Scheduled monument
- Official name: Auchengallon Cairn
- Type: Prehistoric ritual and funerary: cairn (type uncertain)
- Designated: 7 July 1994
- Reference no.: SM90023

Auchagallon Stone Circle or Auchengallon cairn is the remains of a Neolithic or Bronze Age burial cairn, surrounded by a circle of fifteen stones. It is located near Machrie on the Isle of Arran in Scotland (grid reference NR89293464).

== Description ==
The cairn and stone circle is situated on a slight ledge of a west-facing slope, overlooking Machrie Bay. The circle comprises fifteen blocks varying in height from 0.5 metres to 2.3 metres. The stones are of red sandstone, except two which are a pale grey granite. The circle has a maximum diameter of 14.5 metres.

In the centre is a large stone cairn. Antiquarians digging here in the 19th century found a burial cist in the centre, although there are no records of any other remains. Although the monument is now called a stone circle, it was probably built as a kerbed cairn.
