= Caterthun =

Ridge of hills in Angus, Scotland

Coordinates: 56°47′3″N 2°44′27″W

Designations

Scheduled monument
- Official name: The Caterthuns, hillforts
- Type: Prehistoric domestic and defensive: fort (includes hill fort and promontory fort)
- Designated: 18 August 1882
- Reference no.: SM90069

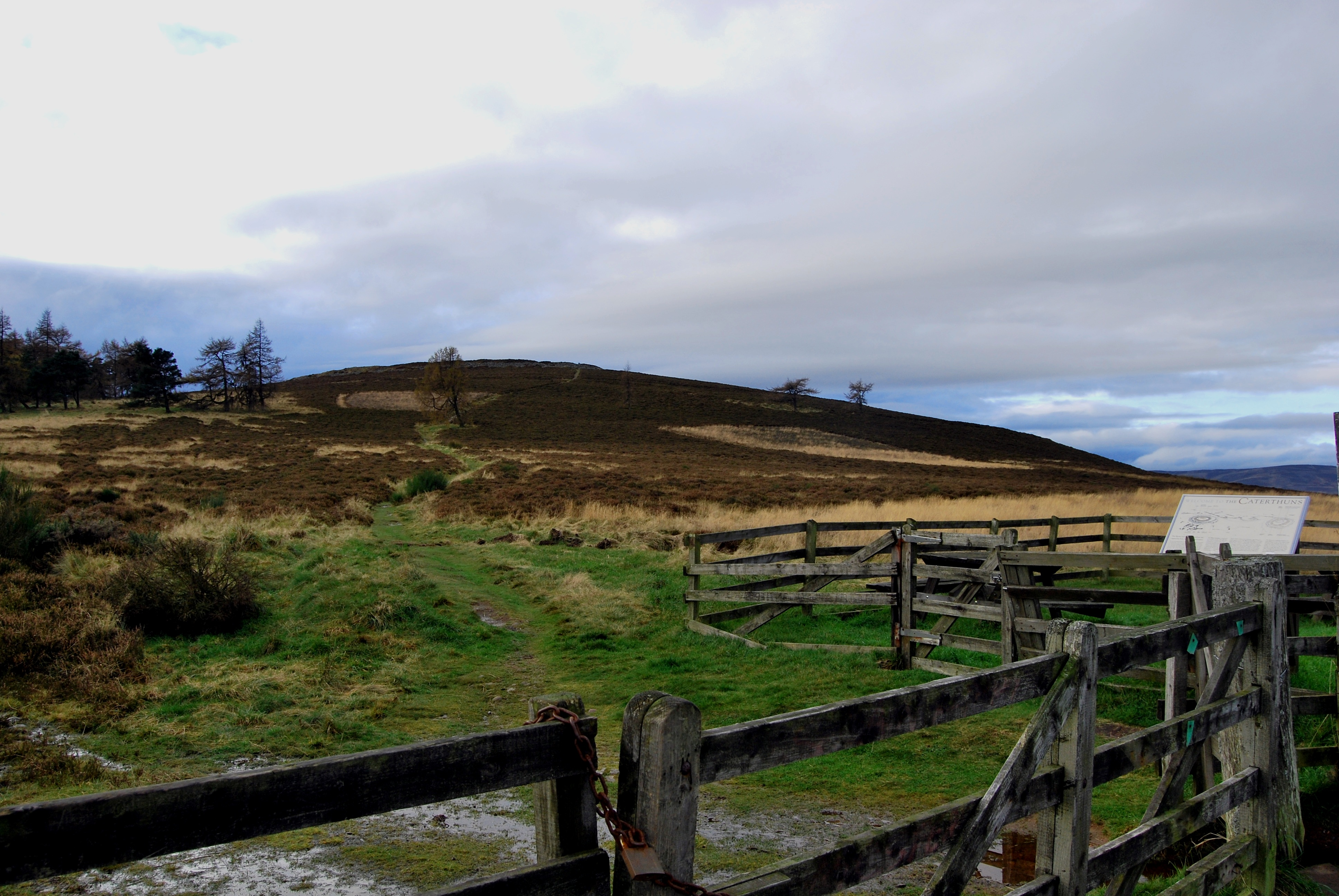

Caterthun, or the Caterthuns, is a ridge of hills near the city of Brechin in Angus, Scotland. The Caterthuns are notable for being the site of two Iron Age forts known as the White Caterthun and the Brown Caterthun which are designated as a scheduled monument.

The White Caterthun, on the west, is dominated by an oval fort consisting of a massive dry-stone wall, with a well or cistern in the middle. The light-coloured stone wall gives the White Caterthun its name. The photo shows part of the dry-stone wall on the summit of the White Caterthun:

The Brown Caterthun, on the east, consists of a series of earthen embankments (hence the name 'brown'). There is little evidence of settlement, agriculture or water supply here, so the purpose of the earthworks is uncertain. Brown may be from the British word for hill (bron / bryn).

Both Caterthuns show several entrances to the summit that radiate outwards, like the spokes on a wheel. The significance of these entrances, if any, is unknown, but they may have aligned with geographical features that no longer exist, such as other settlements. From radio-carbon dating, the Brown Caterthun appears to have been built and modified over several centuries in the latter half of the first millennium BC. Parts of the White Caterthun may have been contemporary with the Brown Caterthun, but it is believed that the main stone wall was built by the Picts or their progenitors in the first few centuries AD.
