= Dyce Symbol Stones =

Pictish stones in Scotland

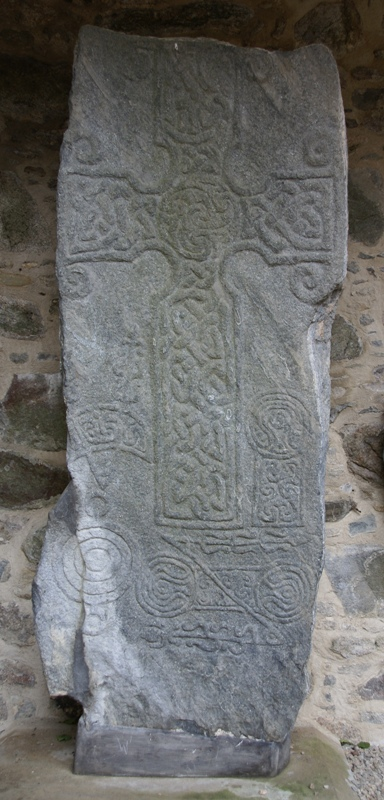
- Dyce II
- Symbols: Dyce I: Pictish Beast; Double disc and z-rod Dyce II: Knotwork interlaced cross; Crescent and v-rod; triple disc; double disc and z-rod; mirror case
- Created: Sixth-Ninth Century CE
- Place: Dyce, Aberdeen, Scotland
- Coordinates: 57.2293°N 2.2082°W
- Classification: Dyce I: Type I incised stone Dyce II: Type II cross slab
- Culture: Picto-Scottish

The Dyce Symbol Stones are a collection of Pictish and Early Medieval sculptured stones that are housed in a shelter in the ruined St Fergus's Chapel, Dyce, Aberdeen, Scotland. There are two larger stones, known as Dyce I and Dyce II, that bear idiomatically Pictish symbols, as well as several smaller sculptured stones.

== Dyce I ==
This is a Class I stone, bearing incised Pictish symbols. The symbols are the Pictish Beast and the Double disc and z-rod.

== Dyce II ==
This is a Class II cross slab bearing a Celtic cross decorated with knotwork and a central boss with spiral work. round the base of the cross are the Crescent and v-rod, Double disc and z-rod, triple disc and mirror case. On the side is an ogham inscription that transliterates as:

EOTTASSARRHETODDEDDOTS MAQQ ROGODDADD

== Gallery ==
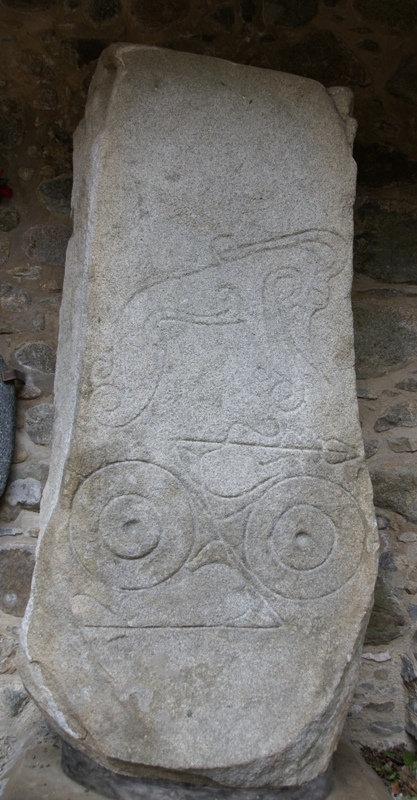
Dyce I
