= Maiden Stone =

Pictish stone in Scotland

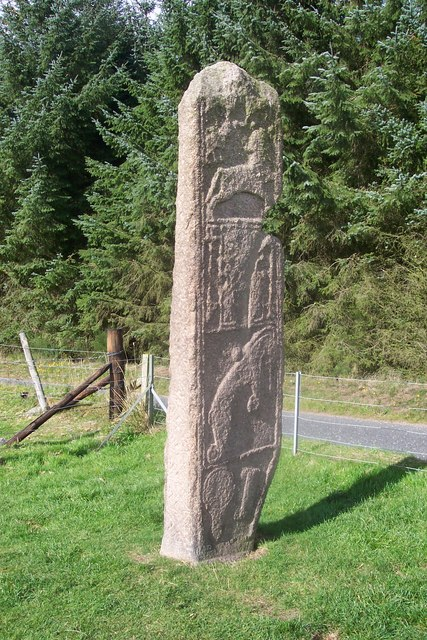
- Maiden Stone in 2006
- Symbols: Pictish beast; Rectangle and Z-rod
- Present location: Inverurie, Aberdeenshire
- Coordinates: 57.312029°N 2.4933934°W
- Classification: Class II incised stone
- Culture: Picto-Scottish

Designations

Scheduled monument
- Official name: Maiden Stone
- Type: Crosses and carved stones: cross slab; symbol stone
- Designated: 30 November 1923
- Reference no.: SM90210

The Maiden Stone, also known as the Drumdurno Stone after the nearby farm, is a Pictish standing stone near Inverurie in Aberdeenshire in Scotland, probably dating from the late 8th or early 9th century AD.

== Name ==
The name is derived from local legend, incorporating the most obvious mark of wear and tear on the stone: a triangular notch toward the top of the monument.

The legend states that the daughter of the Laird of Balquhain made a bet with a stranger that she could bake a bannock faster than he could build a road to the top of Bennachie. The prize would be the maiden's hand. However, the stranger was the Devil and finished the road and claimed the forfeit. The maiden ran from the Devil and prayed to be saved. The legend finishes by saying that God turned her to stone, but the notch is where the Devil grasped her shoulder as she ran.

== Interpretation ==
As a cross-slab combining Christian imagery with traditional Pictish symbols, the Maiden Stone is an obviously Christian monument and, given its size, was likely intended as a notable landmark.

== Description ==
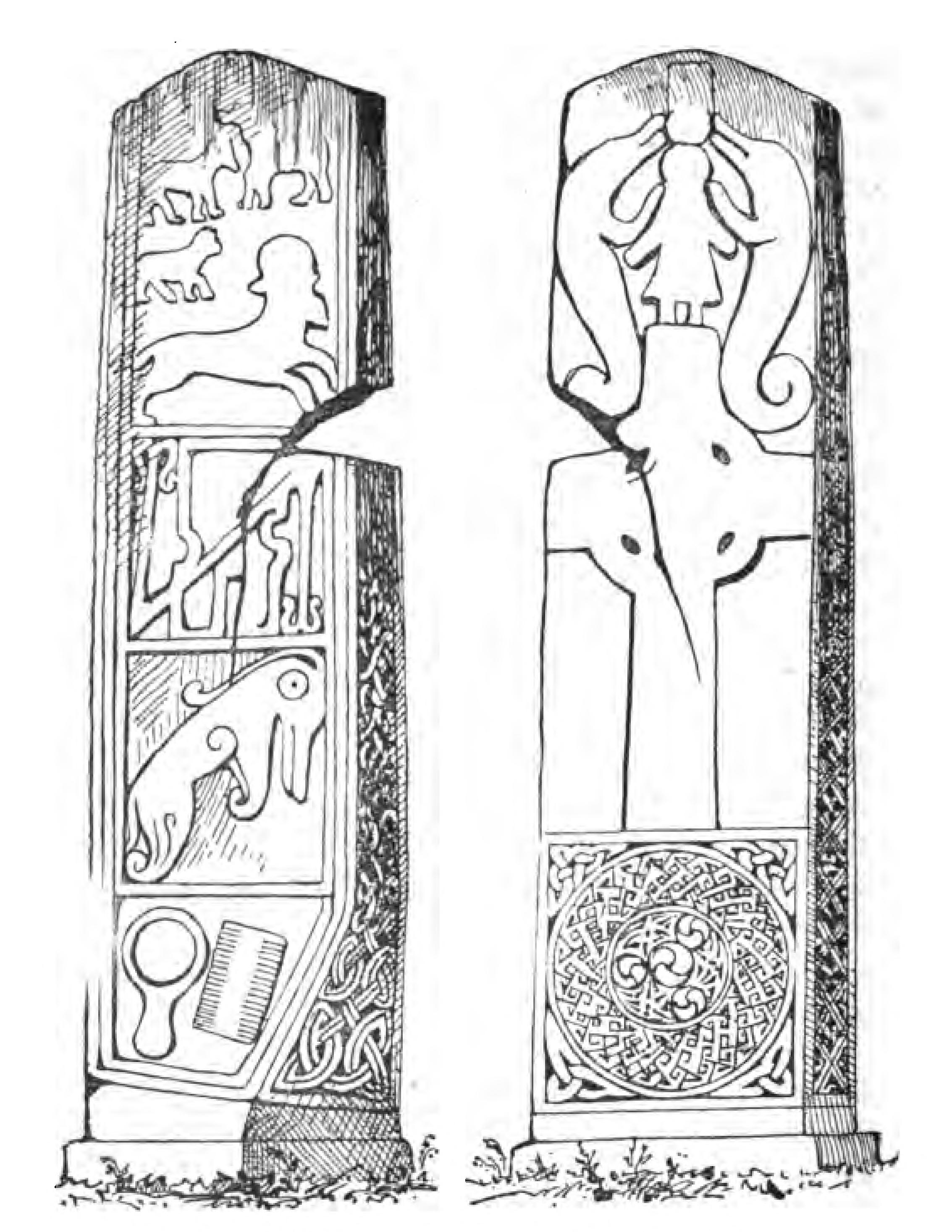
19th century drawing

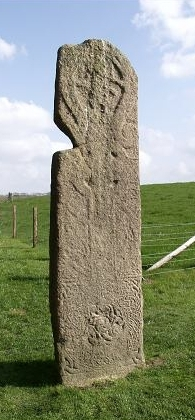
West face

The stone is red granite, standing approximately 3m high, about 0.9m broad and about 0.3m thick (one of the tallest of all Pictish monuments, even though several centimetres have been lost at the top owing to weathering). It is a Class II Pictish monument (combining Christian, and pre-Christian Pictish, motifs), dating from the late 8th or early 9th century AD.

The west side has a ringed cross below a human figure between two "fish-monsters". Below the cross there is a square panel with a disc containing a Celtic spiral motif at its centre, surrounded by a key-patterned ring, with knotwork patterns infilling the corners. On the reverse, there are four panels enclosing: a large centaur below three very weathered figures (possibly two smaller wrestling centaurs and a dog); a "notched rectangle and Z-rod" symbol; a Pictish Beast symbol, a mirror and a comb. There is a knotwork pattern on the narrow north edge and a keywork pattern on the south edge. A portion of the north edge is missing and the patterns are heavily eroded, particularly on the western face.

The human figure and "fish-monsters" may represent the Biblical story of Jonah and the Whale, with the whale doubled to make the design symmetrical.

The site is a scheduled monument under the care of Historic Environment Scotland and is open at all times.

== See also ==
- Stones of Scotland
