= Carlungie and Ardestie earthhouses =

Late Iron Age earthhouses in Scotland

Coordinates: 56°30′48″N 2°47′45″W

Carlungie and Ardestie Earthhouses can be found in farmland north of Monifieth and Carnoustie. They date to the late Iron Age, from the 1st to 2nd centuries AD. They are examples of souterrains, probably used to store food.

== Ardestie Earthhouse ==
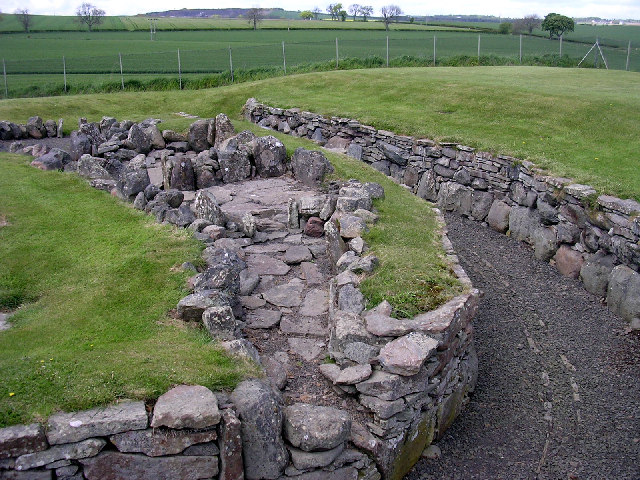
Ardestie Earthhouse

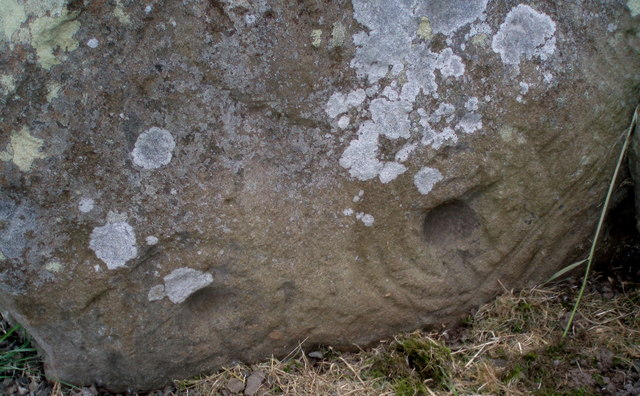
Cup and ring marks at Ardestie

Designations

Scheduled monument
- Official name: Ardestie, souterrain
- Type: Prehistoric domestic and defensive: souterrain, earth-house
- Designated: 30 November 1981
- Reference no.: SM90021

Ardestie earthhouse was discovered in the 1940s to the north of Mains of Ardestie farm. It was excavated in 1949–1950 by F.T. Wainwright, who first suggested that the function of the souterrain was as an underground cow byre, although grain storage and ritual use have also been suggested. Incorporated into the structure are recycled stones with Neolithic/Bronze Age cup and ring marks

== Carlungie Earthhouse ==
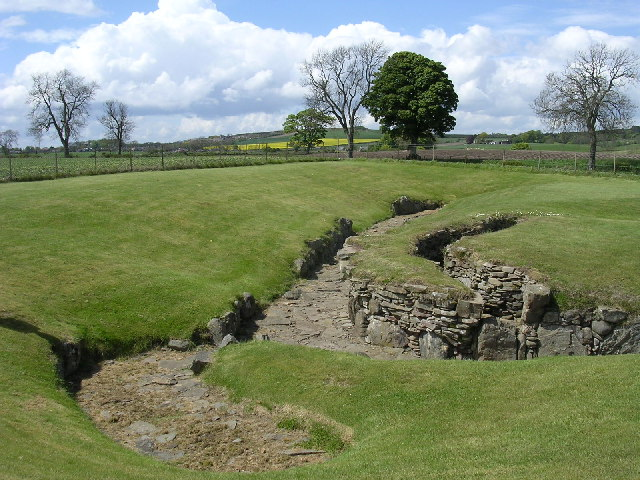
Carlungie Earthhouse

Designations

Scheduled monument
- Official name: Carlungie, souterrain
- Type: Prehistoric domestic and defensive: souterrain, earth-house
- Designated: 30 November 1981
- Reference no.: SM90059

Carlungie earthhouse was excavated in 1950–1951, also by Wainwright. It is of similar date and a similar interpretation of its utilisation was made.
