= List of churches in Orkney =

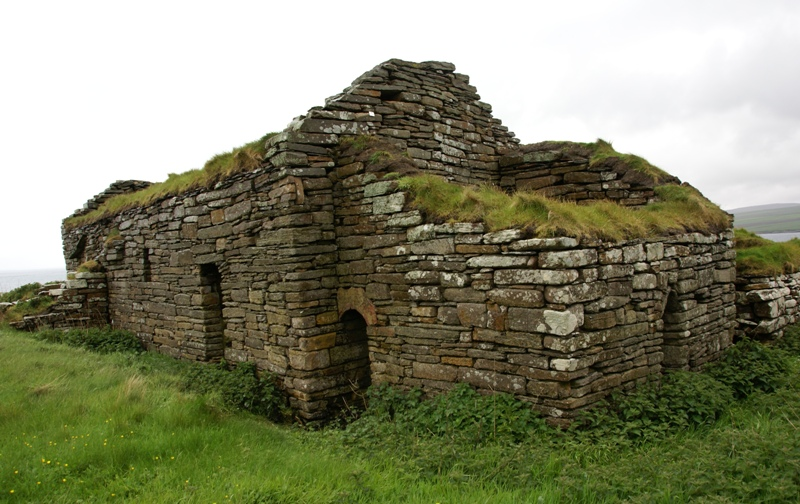
Eynhallow Church

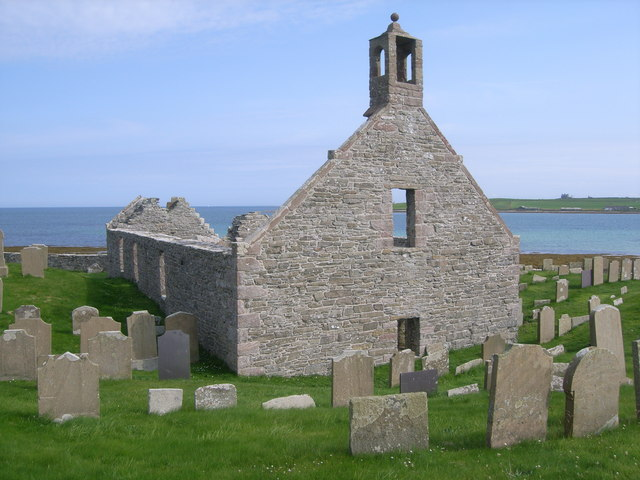
Lady Kirk

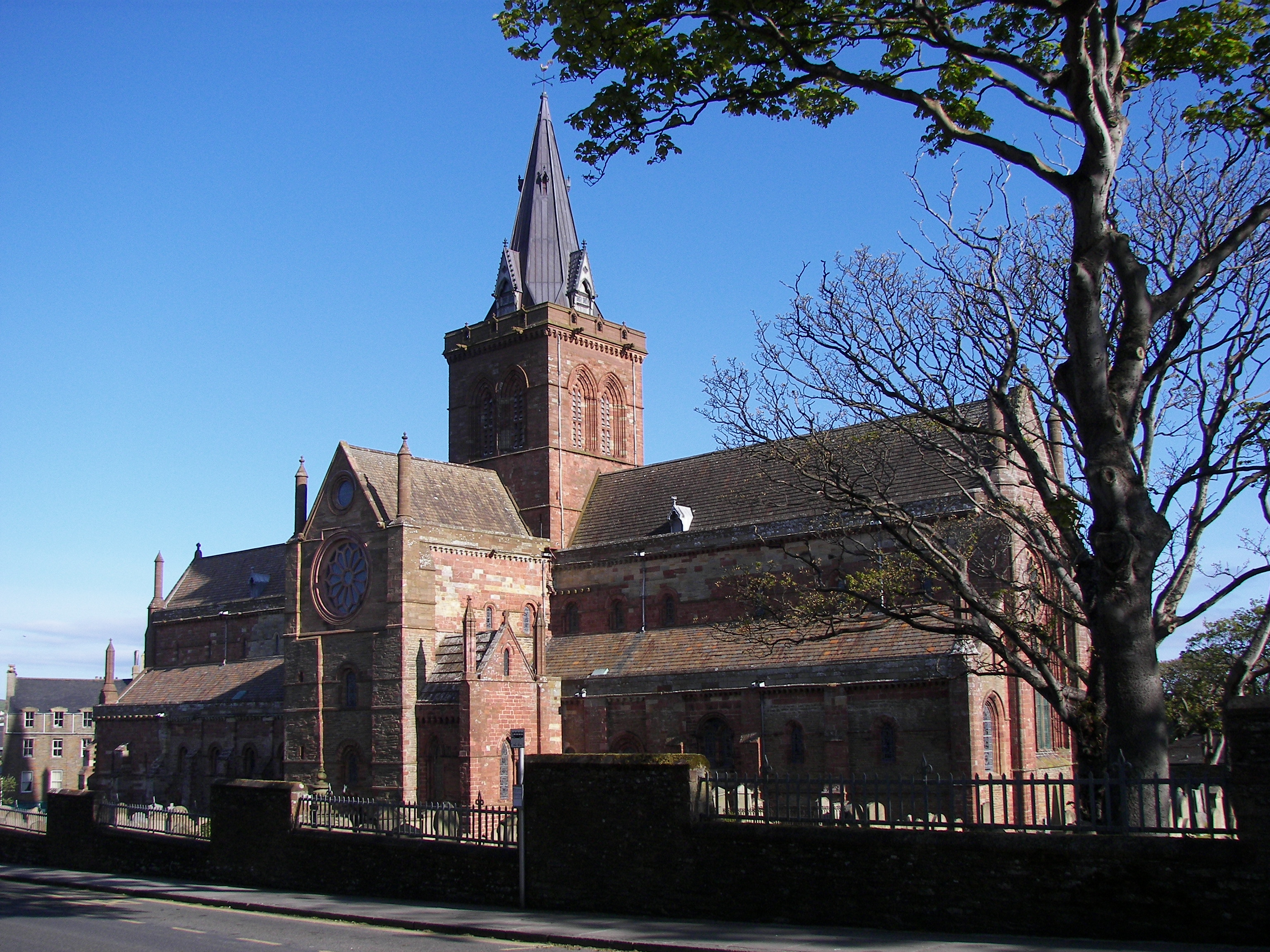
Magnus Erlendsson, Earl of Orkney was killed by his cousin Haakon Paulsson in April 1116. The building of St. Magnus Cathedral, Kirkwall in his honour by Rögnvald Kali commenced in 1137.

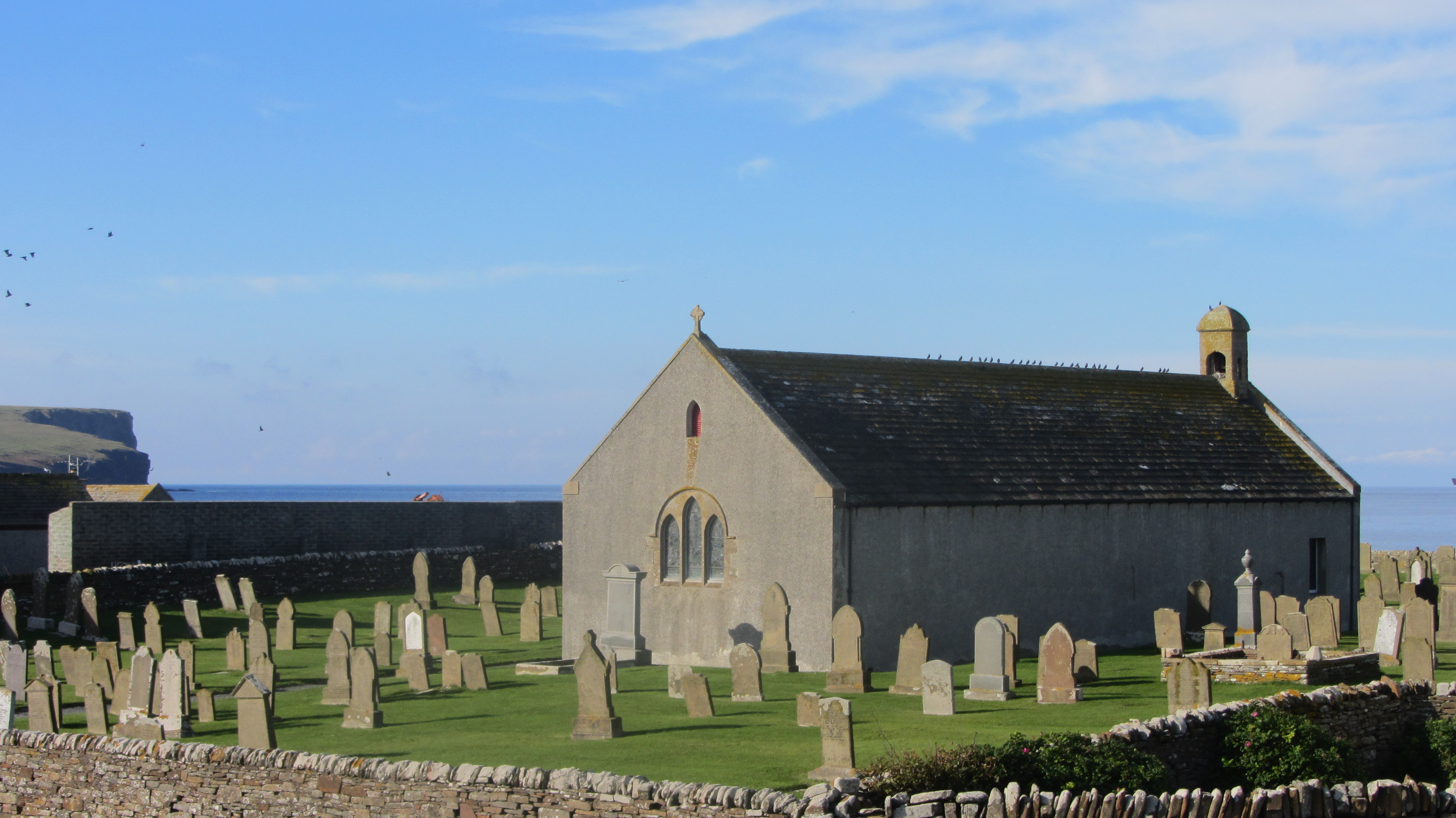
St Magnus Church, Birsay

A List of churches in Orkney, Scotland:

The islands have an estimated 27 active churches for 21,500 inhabitants, a ratio of one church to every 796 people.

The islands were originally divided into 21 civil parishes: Birsay and Harray, Cross and Burness (on Sanday), Eday, Evie and Rendall, Firth, Holm, Hoy and Graemsay, Kirkwall and St Ola, Lady (on Sanday), Orphir, Papa Westray, Rousay and Egilsay, Sandwick, Shapinsay, South Ronaldsay, St Andrews and Deerness, Stenness, Stromness, Stronsay, South Walls & Flotta, and Westray.

On 1 October 2024 almost all of the Church of Scotland parishes in Orkney united as a single parish, known as Orkney Islands Church of Scotland, retaining most of the current church buildings and served by a team ministry. (As of late 2024 the parish churches of Evie & Rendall linked with Firth are not yet part of this new union).

Name	Civil parish (settlement)	Web	Parish founded	Denomination	Notes
Sanday Church of Scotland	Cross & Burness (Broughtown)			Church of Scotland	
North Ronaldsay Church of Scotland	Cross & Burness (N Ronaldsay)		1812	Church of Scotland	
Eday Church of Scotland	Eday			Church of Scotland	
Evie Church of Scotland	Evie & Rendall			Church of Scotland	Shares a minister with Firth, Rendall and Rousay
Rendall Church of Scotland	Evie & Rendall			Church of Scotland	Shares a minister with Evie, Firth and Rousay
Firth Church of Scotland	Firth		Medieval	Church of Scotland	Shares a minister with Evie, Rendall and Rousay
East Mainland Church	Holm			Church of Scotland	Serves Deerness, Holm and St Andrews parishes
St John's Kirk, Hoy & Walls	Hoy & Graemsay (Little Ayre)			Church of Scotland	Shares a minister with Flotta and Orphir & Stenness
St Magnus Cathedral	Kirkwall & St Ola		1137	Church of Scotland	Dedicated to St Magnus. Technically no longer a cathedral
Kirkwall East Church	Kirkwall & St Ola			Church of Scotland	Shares a minister with Shapinsay
St Olaf's Episcopal Church	Kirkwall & St Ola		1876-1878	Episcopal Church	Dedicated to St Olaf. Episcopacy in the islands dates back to C16th
Kirkwall Baptist Church	Kirkwall & St Ola			Independent	
Our Lady & St Joseph, Kirkwall	Kirkwall & St Ola			Roman Catholic	Dedicated to SS Mary & Joseph
Orphir & Stenness Church of Scotland	Orphir		Medieval	Church of Scotland	Shares a minister with Flotta and Hoy & Walls
Papa Westray Church of Scotland	Papa Westray			Church of Scotland	Shares a minister with Westray. Building originally Free Church
Rousay Church of Scotland	Rousay & Egilsay			Church of Scotland	Shares minister with Evie, Firth & Rendall. Serves Egilsay & Wyre
Milestone Community Church	Sandwick (Dounby)		2011-2012	Church of Scotland	Serves Birsay & Harray and Sandwick parishes (united 2000)
Dounby United Free Church	Sandwick (Dounby)			United Free Church	
Shapinsay Church of Scotland	Shapinsay			Church of Scotland	Shares a minister with Kirkwall East
South Ronaldsay & Burray CoS	S Ronaldsay (St Margaret's Hope)			Church of Scotland	Also serves Burray
Flotta Church of Scotland	South Walls & Flotta			Church of Scotland	Shares a minister with Hoy and Walls and Orphir and Stenness
Stromness & Graemsay CoS	Stromness			Church of Scotland	Also holds monthly services in a community centre on Graemsay
St Mary the Virgin Episcopal Church	Stromness			Episcopal Church	Dedicated to St Mary
Stromness Baptist Church	Stromness			Independent	
Moncur Memorial Church, Stronsay	Stronsay			Church of Scotland	
Westray Church of Scotland	Westray			Church of Scotland	Shares a minister with Papa Westray. United with Westray UFC 2005
Westray Baptist Church	Westray (Pierowall)			Independent	
Jehovah's Witnesses	Kirkwall			Jehovah's Witnesses	30 Mill St., Kirkwall KW15 1NL, UK

== Defunct churches ==
Name	Civil parish (settlement)	Founded	Redundant	Denomination	Notes
St Magnus Church, Birsay	Birsay & Harray	Medieval	1996	Church of Scotland	Built in 1664 on the site of an earlier 11th century church.
St Peters Chapel, Birsay	Birsay	Early 12th century		Catholic Church in Scotland	Remained in use until the 13th century. Until the Reformation, it was a popular pilgrimage site.
Birsay (Twatt) Church of Scotland	Birsay & Harray	1875	2008	Church of Scotland	
St Michael's, Harray	Birsay & Harray	1836	2010s	Church of Scotland	
Cross Church of Scotland	Cross & Burness			Church of Scotland	Ruins remain
St Columba's, Burness	Cross & Burness			Church of Scotland	Now vanished but burial ground remains
Italian Chapel, Lamb Holm	Holm	1942-43		Roman Catholic	Built by Italian prisoners of war; still in occasional use
Graemsay Kirk	Hoy & Graemsay	C19th		Church of Scotland	No longer in use
St Olaf's Kirk, Kirkwall	Kirkwall & St Ola	Medieval		Church of Scotland	Ruins remain
Eynhallow Church		Medieval	pre C16th		Ruins only
Lady Kirk, Sanday	Lady (on Sanday)			Church of Scotland	Most recent building 1773. Ruined
Orphir Round Church	Orphir	Medieval	C18th		Ruins only
St Boniface's Church, Papa Westray	Papa Westray	Medieval	1930	Church of Scotland	Originally built in the 12 century, expanded in 1710. The site dates to a large Iron Age settlement. Hogback stone in graveyard.
St Magnus, Egilsay	Rousay & Egilsay	Medieval		Church of Scotland	Ruins only
Deerness Church of Scotland	St Andrews & Deerness	1829		Church of Scotland	
St Andrews Church of Scotland	St Andrews & Deerness (Tankerness)	1801		Church of Scotland	
St Peter, Sandwick	Sandwick	1670	1960s	Church of Scotland	Current building 1836–1837. Scottish Redundant Churches Trust 1998
Sandwick United Free Church	Sandwick	1836	2008	Church of Scotland	Joined CoS in 1929. Sold 2008, along with Birsay & Harray churches
Burray Baptist Church	South Ronaldsay (Burray)		1966		Closed in 1966, now used as a fishing store
St Lawrence's, Burray	South Ronaldsay (Burray)				Roofless ruin
St Columba's, South Walls	South Walls & Flotta	1832		Church of Scotland	Active in 2002 listing but not listed on Orkney Presbytery's website
Stenness Parish Church	Stenness	Medieval	2000s	Church of Scotland	Rebuilt 1760, 1774. Recently sold
Lady Kirk, Westray	Westray (Pierowall)	Medieval			Rebuilt 1674. Ruins only
Westside Church	Westray (Tuquoy)				Ruins only
St Mary's Chapel, Wyre	Wyre	Medieval		Church of Scotland	Ruins only
