= St Magnus Church =

St Magnus Church, St Magnus' Church or St Magnus's Church may refer to one of several churches dedicated to a St Magnus:

- Magnus of Anagni
  - Santi Michele e Magno, Rome
- Magnus of Füssen
  - St. Mang's Abbey, Füssen
  - Magnuskirche, Worms
- Magnus the Martyr
  - St Magnus-the-Martyr, London
  - St Magnus Cathedral, Kirkwall, Orkney
  - St Magnus Church, Egilsay, Orkney
  - Orphir Roundchurch, Orphir, Orkney
  - Magnus Cathedral, Faroe Islands
