= St Magnus Church, Birsay =

Medieval church located on the mainlaind of Orkney, Scotland

Coordinates: 59°07′46″N 3°18′58″W

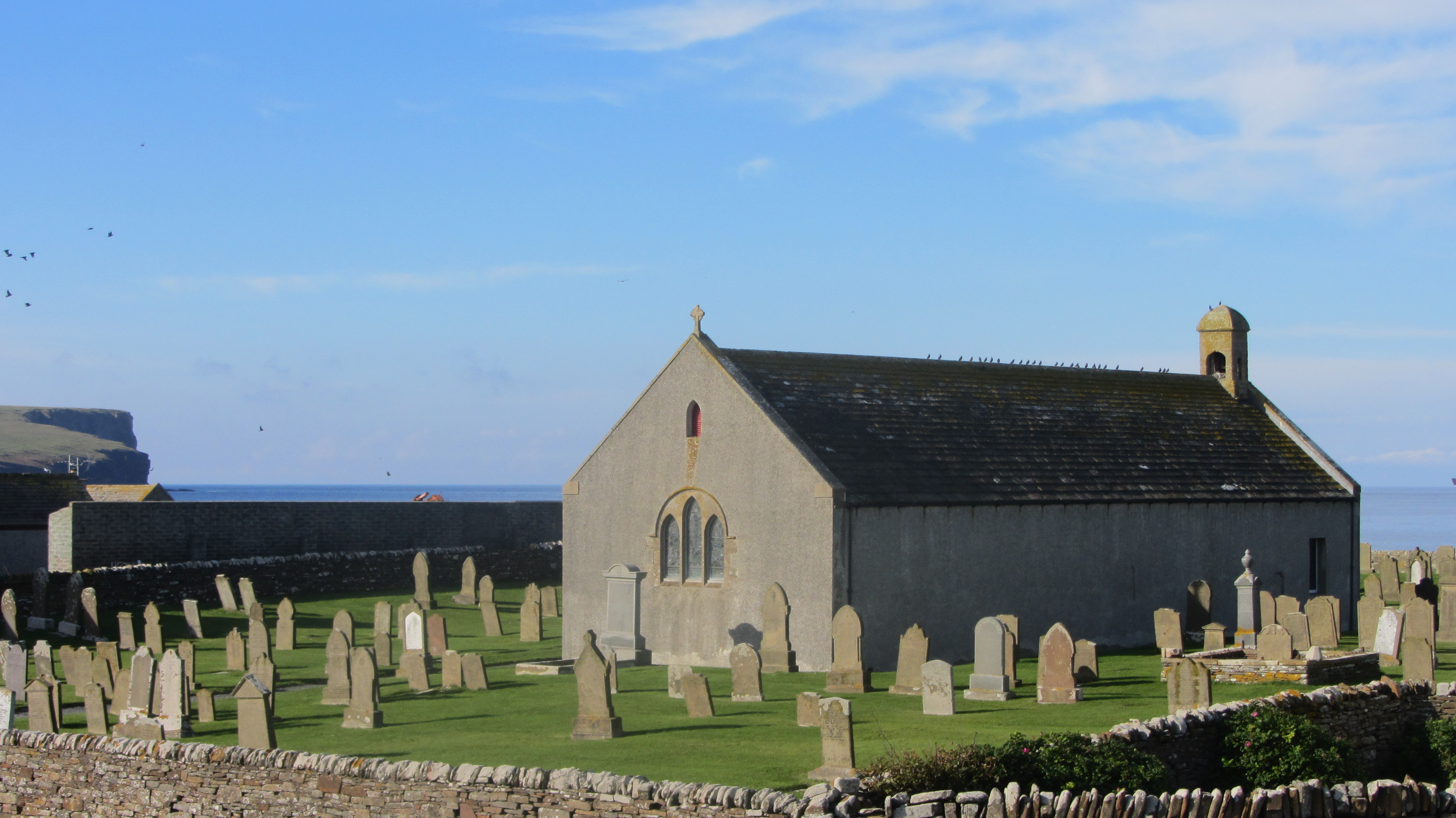
St Magnus Church and graveyard, Mainland Orkney

St Magnus Church, Birsay is a 17th-century church located in the parish of Birsay on Mainland, Orkney in Scotland. Built in 1664 on the site of an earlier, 11th-century church, St Magnus was later expanded in 1760 and 1867. The graveyard surrounding the church dates to the 18th century. The church building is now maintained by the St Magnus Church Birsay Trust.

== Description ==
St Magnus's Church is located in the village of Birsay in the northwest area of Mainland, Orkney in Scotland. It is a rectangular building with a harled exterior, round-headed windows and gabled ends. The western gable contains an original birdcage style belfry. The church has a small southwest porch, possibly dating from the 1867 remodel.

The church has a plain interior, its only adornment an early 20th-century, three-panel stained glass window, decorated with images of the Crucifixion and the life of St Magnus. In the north and south walls are remnants of the earlier medieval church. These include a narrow blocked round-arched door, a small, blocked lancet window in the north wall, and another blocked lancet window in the south wall. There is also a late medieval font, made of red sandstone. The font's octagonal bowl is inscribed with a coat of arms. The graveyard surrounding the church contains several gravestones dating to the mid and late 18th century.

== History ==
The church was built in 1664 on the site of a previous church, built between 1050 and 1064 by Earl Thorfinn of Orkney. It was originally called Christ Church (or Christ's Kirk). The earlier church is the temporary burial location of Magnus Erlendsson, Earl of Orkney, also known as St Magnus, who was murdered on the island of Egilsay in 1116. When Earl Magnus was declared a saint around 1136, his bones were exhumed at the church and placed in a shrine on top of an altar. The saint's bones were later moved to the new St Magnus Cathedral in Kirkwall, which was built in honour of the popular saint.

The early medieval church was built in a cruciform plan. What is left of the early church is the blocked round-arched door, and two small blocked lancet windows. In 1760, the church was remodeled and expanded to its current rectangular plan. In 1867, a small porch was added to the building. Around 1900, a three panel stained-glass window was designed by Mrs Loveday McPherson, and executed by Alex Strachan, brother of stained glass artist, Douglas Strachan. The window was installed in the east wall of the church in 1904.

St Magnus has been designated a Grade II* listed building since 1971. The church continued to be used as a parish church until 1996. It was then given by the Church of Scotland to a new established local trust, The St Magnus Church Birsay Trust. The trust is responsible for the preservation and maintenance of historic buildings.

In 2012 the Church of Scotland opened the new Milestone Community Church building at Vetquoy Road, Dounby, which now serves the communities of Birsay, Harray and Sandwick. Since October 2024 the former ecclesiastical parish of Birsay, Harray and Sandwick has been part of the united Orkney Islands Church of Scotland.

== Gallery ==
St Magnus church

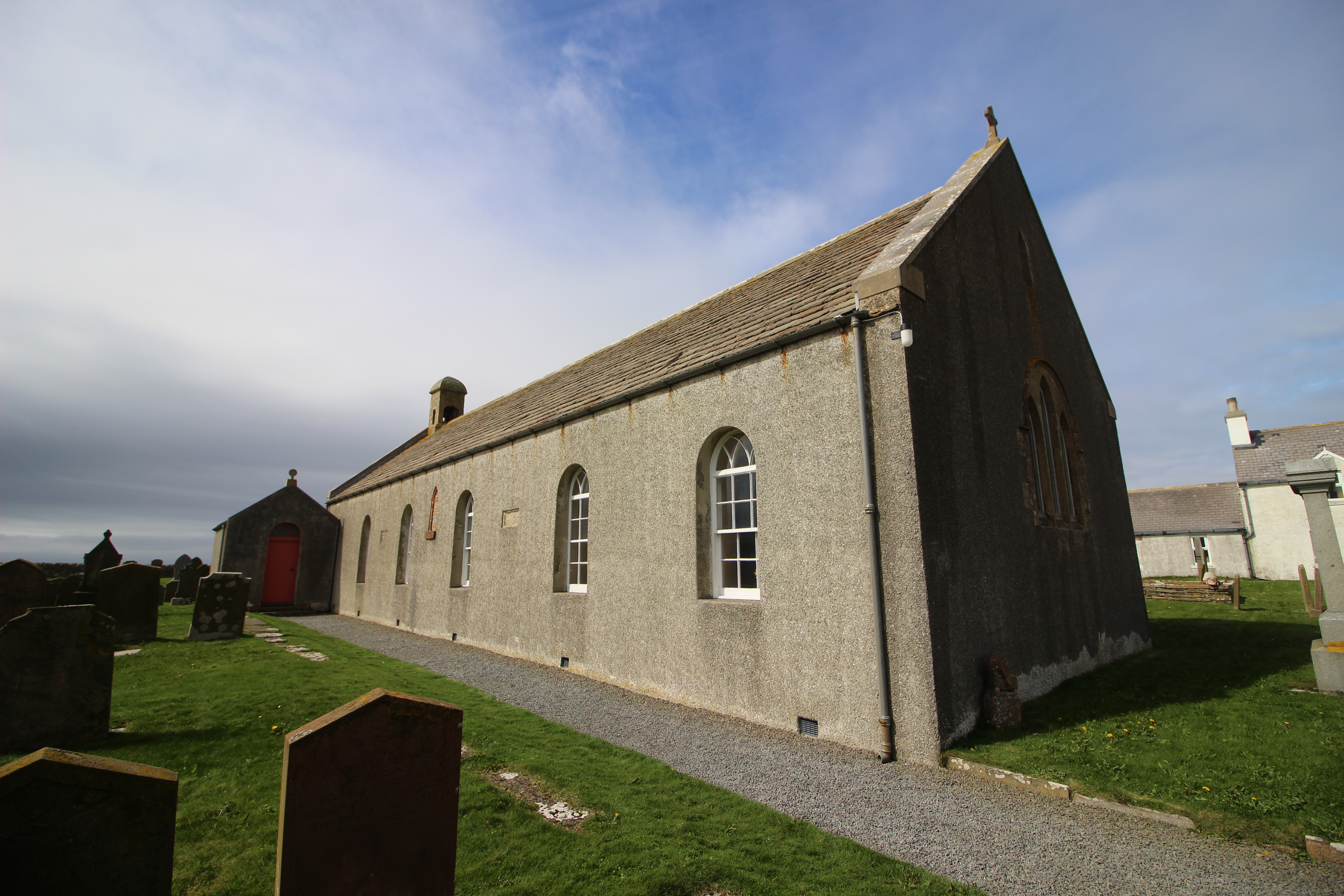

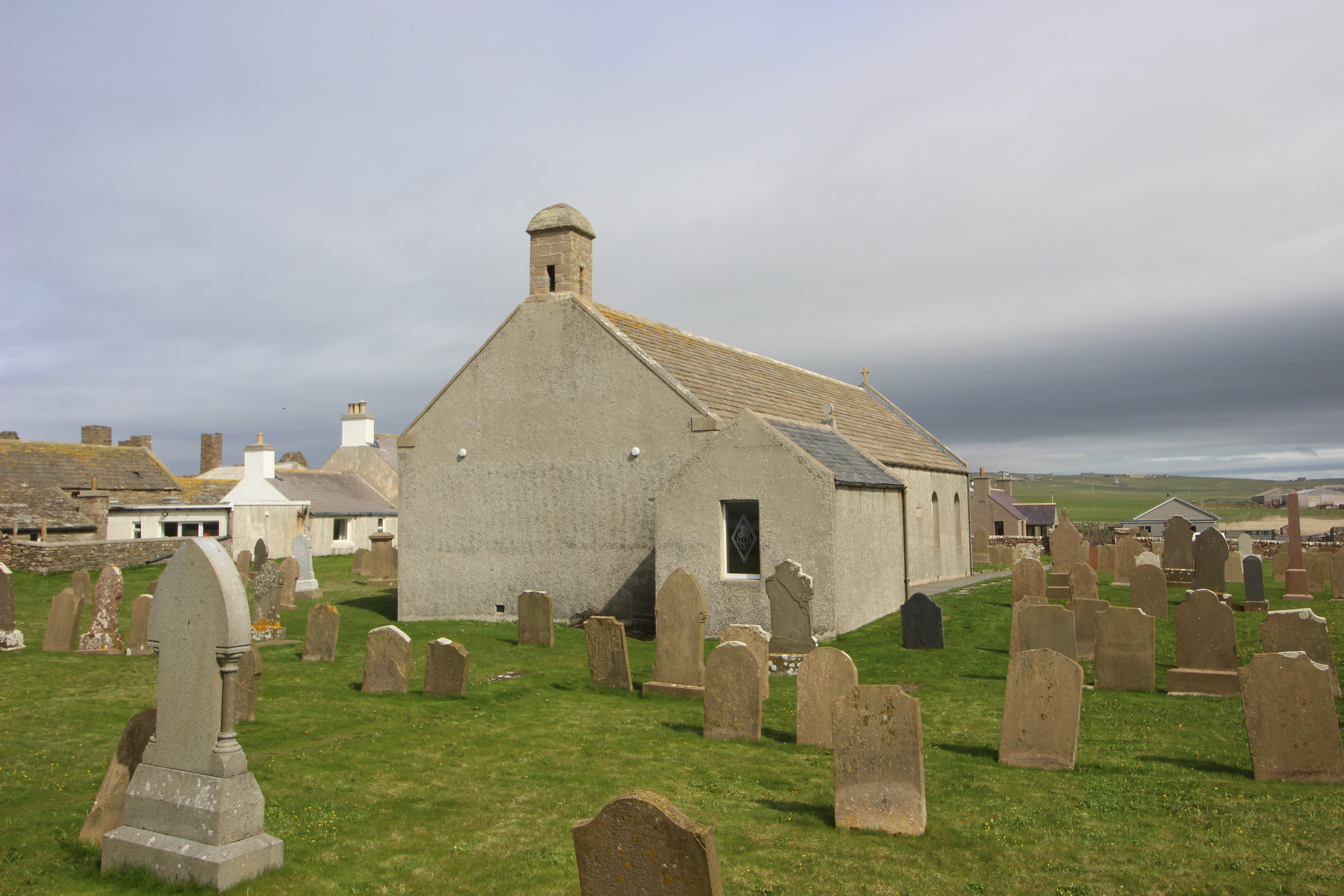

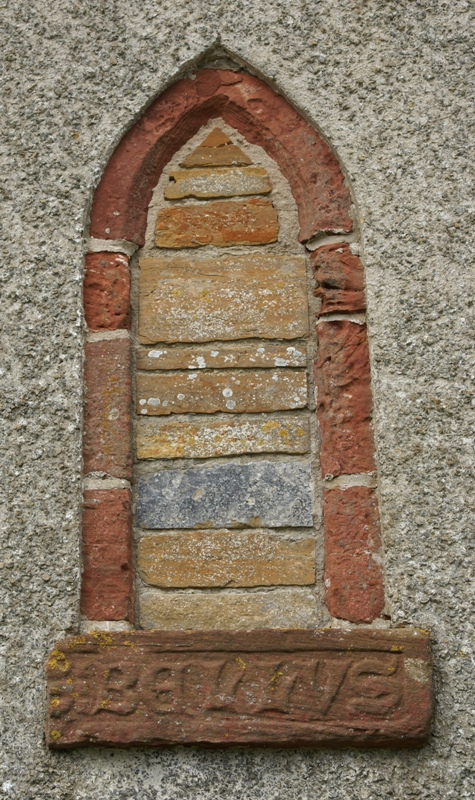

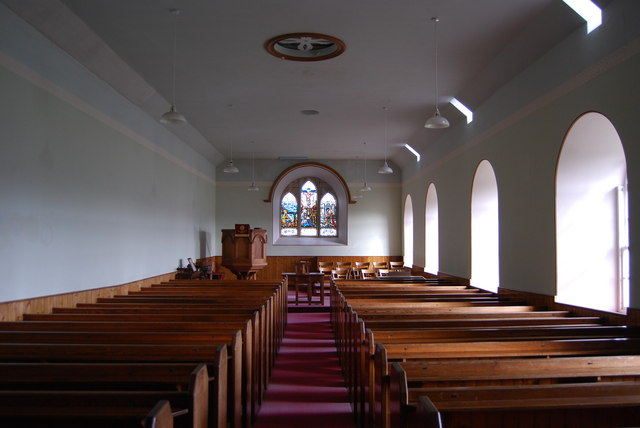

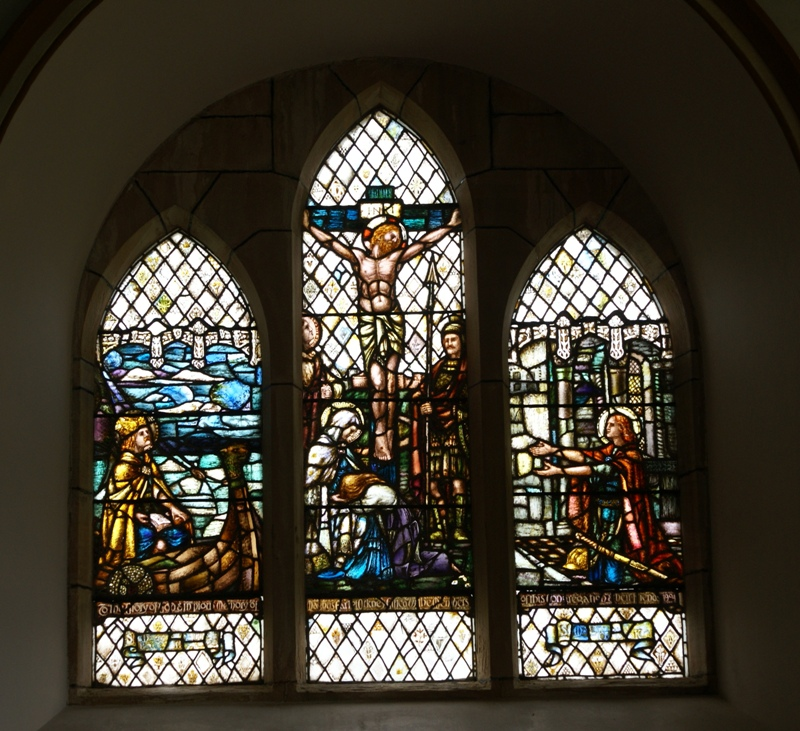

== See also ==
- St Olaf's Church, Unst
- St Magnus Church, Egilsay
- List of churches in Orkney
