= Orkney Islands Church of Scotland =

On 1 October 2024, almost all of the former parish churches in Orkney united to create a single Orkney Islands Church of Scotland staffed by a team ministry. It is part of the Church of Scotland's Presbytery of the North East and the Northern Isles ("NENI"). As of September 2026, the parish churches of Evie & Rendall are not yet part of this new structure, but all other formerly separate parishes in Orkney have joined.

The former Presbytery of Orkney was split into the three presbyteries of Cairston, Kirkwall and North Isles in 1725. They merged back into the Presbytery of Orkney in 1929-30, with the union of the Church of Scotland and the majority of the United Free Church of Scotland.

The parish has a congregation of approximately 1800, and is allocated 7 FTE staff.

Orkney Islands Church of Scotland includes the former parish churches of:

Names of former parish (before October 2024)	Population	Buildings	Founded
Birsay, Harray & Sandwick	2,224	Milestone Community Church, Dounby	2012
Flotta l/w Orphir & Stenness l/w Hoy & Walls	1,566	Orphir Church	Medieval
Flotta l/w Orphir & Stenness l/w Hoy & Walls	1,566	St Columba's, Longhope, South Walls	1832
Stromness	2,286		
Evie l/w Rendall l/w Rousay l/w Firth (as of June 2026 Evie & Rendall are not yet part of the recently-united Orkney Islands Church of Scotland, but Rousay and Firth have joined)	1,877	Rendall Church	
Evie l/w Rendall l/w Rousay l/w Firth (as of June 2026 Evie & Rendall are not yet part of the recently-united Orkney Islands Church of Scotland, but Rousay and Firth have joined)	1,877	Firth Church, Finstown	
Eday	160	Eday Church	
North Ronaldsay	72	North Ronaldsay Church (meets in school)	
Sanday	494		
Papa Westray l/w Westray	678	St Ann's, Papa Westray	
Papa Westray l/w Westray	678	Westray Church	
Stronsay Moncur Memorial	353	Moncur Memorial Church, Stronsay	
Kirkwall East l/w Shapinsay	8,575	North Church, Shapinsay	
Kirkwall East l/w Shapinsay	8,575	Kirkwall East Church	1796
Kirkwall St Magnus Cathedral	8,575	St Magnus Cathedral, Kirkwall	Medieval
East Mainland	1,746	East Mainland Church, Holm	
South Ronaldsay & Burray	1,318	St Margaret's, St Margaret's Hope, S. Ronaldsay	

== Closed churches ==
Church	Founded	Closed
St Magnus, Egilsay	Medieval	
St Olaf's, Kirkwall	Medieval	C17th
St Nicholas, Stronsay*	Medieval	C18th
St Peter's, Stronsay*	Medieval	C18th
Burray Church*	Medieval	c. 1800
Cross Parish Church, Sanday*	Medieval	C19th
Hoy Parish Church*	Medieval	C20th
Lady Parish Church, Sanday*	Medieval	C20th
Graemsay Church	Medieval	C20th
Deerness Parish Church*	Medieval	1974
St Peter's, Sandwick*	Medieval	1984
St Andrews Parish Church, Tankerness*	Medieval	c. 1990
Stenness Parish Church*	Medieval	c. 2000
St John's Kirk, North Walls	1883	2001
Birsay Church, Twatt*	Medieval	2008
Sandwick Church, Quoyloo	C19th	2008
St Michael's, Harray*	Medieval	2012
Flotta Church		
Stromness Church		2026
Evie Church		
Rousay Church		2022
North Ronaldsay Church		
Sanday Church		
Broughtown (Burness)		

== See also ==
- List of churches in Orkney
