= Ladykirk =

Ladykirk may refer to:

- Ladykirk, Scottish Borders, a village
- Lady Kirk, Orkney, a ruined church
