= Westside Church =

Ruined 12th century church located on the island of Westray, Orkney, Scotland

Coordinates: 59°16′17″N 2°57′28″W

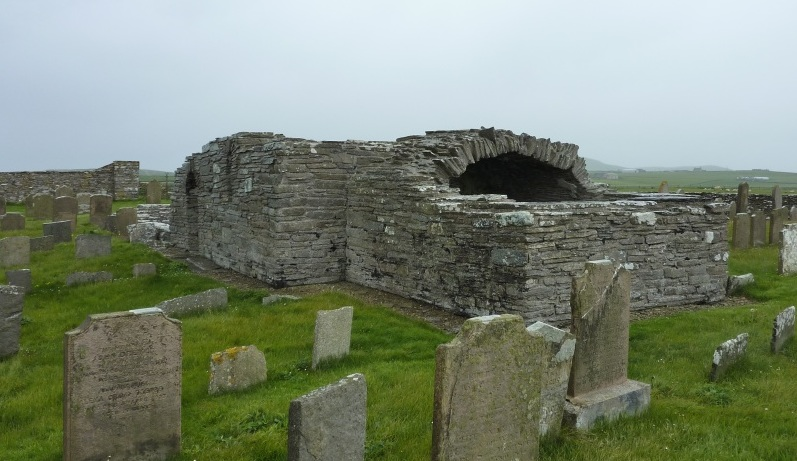
Westside Church and burial ground, Westray

Westside Church, (also known as Cross Kirk), is a ruined 12th century church located on the island of Westray in Orkney, Scotland. Archaeological excavations at the site suggest that the church is related to a nearby late Norse settlement. Historic Environment Scotland established the site, which includes the church and surrounding cemetery, as a scheduled monument in 1921.

== Description ==
The stone remains of Westside church are located on the south shore of the Ness of Tuquoy on the island of Westray in Orkney, Scotland. The original church dates to the 12th century. The building initially consisted of a chancel and a short, rectangular nave, measuring 5.65 m (18.5 ft) by 4.15 m (13.6 ft). The vaulted chancel is entered from the nave through a rounded doorway. The nave was lengthened westward during the 17th century when the parish church needed to accommodate the growing population on the island and a larger congregation. On the east side of the church are the original walls, which reach a height of around 2.5 m (8 ft 2 in). The walls that were built in the 17th century, at the west end of the church, are less than 1 m (3 ft 3 in) in height.

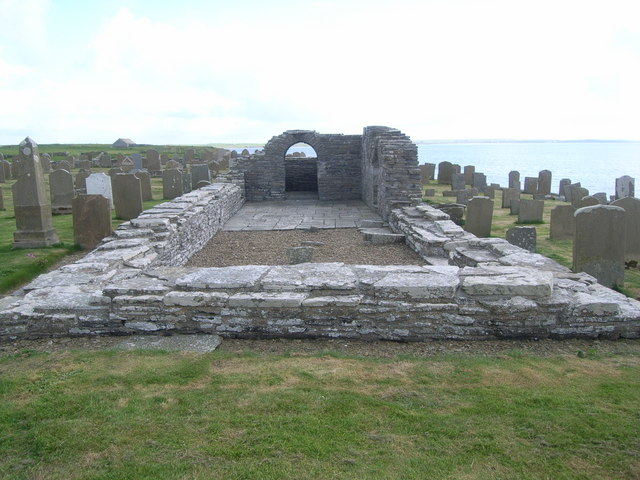
West end of Westside church

Westside church is enclosed by a walled burial ground. Approximately 70 m (230 ft) to the west of the church, coastal erosion has uncovered the remains of a large late Norse settlement. Archaeological excavations at the site suggest the church was probably built to serve the settlement. A grass-covered embankment, measuring approximately 50 m (160 ft) by 25 m (82 ft), and situated to the northeast of the church, is thought to be the remains of an earlier, pre-12th century enclosure. Historic Environment Scotland established the site, which includes the church and burial ground, as a scheduled monument in 1921.

== See also ==
- Lady Kirk
- St Boniface's Church, Papa Westray
- St Olaf's Church, Unst
- List of churches in Orkney
