= Margaret Manson Graham =

Scottish nurse and missionary

Margaret Manson Graham (26 April 1860 – 14 October 1933) was a Scottish nurse who worked as a missionary in Nigeria.

== Early life ==
Margaret Manson Graham was born at Orphir, Orkney, the daughter of Isabella Manson and John Graham. Her father was a weaver. After some time as a teacher in Orphir, she went to Glasgow to train as a nurse.

== Career ==
As a nurse, Margaret Manson Graham joined the Women's Foreign Mission in 1895, and traveled to Calabar. There she served as the first matron at Duketown Hospital, which served mainly Europeans, including crew members of trading vessels. She also worked with the local African population, especially children, and often treated casualties of violence, as in 1901 when she cared for Aro survivors of a military attack. She took up the work of fellow Scottish missionary nurse Mary Slessor, in her particular concern for the fate of twins; she oversaw the building of a care home for abandoned children, and taught embroidery as a marketable skill to women left without traditional supports.

Margaret Manson Graham was awarded the Africa General Service Medal in 1901, and was made a Grade V member of the Order of Saint John in 1906.

== Personal life ==
Upon retirement in 1919, she returned to Orkney, but only stayed a few years before going back to Africa, to live out her days in Nigeria, training young women as nurses and caring for children. Graham died at Arochukwu in 1933, aged 73 years. Her remains were buried next to those of her friend and colleague, Mary Slessor, in Calabar. There is a bronze plaque dedicated to the memory of Margaret Manson Graham, placed at St Magnus Cathedral in Kirkwall in 1964.

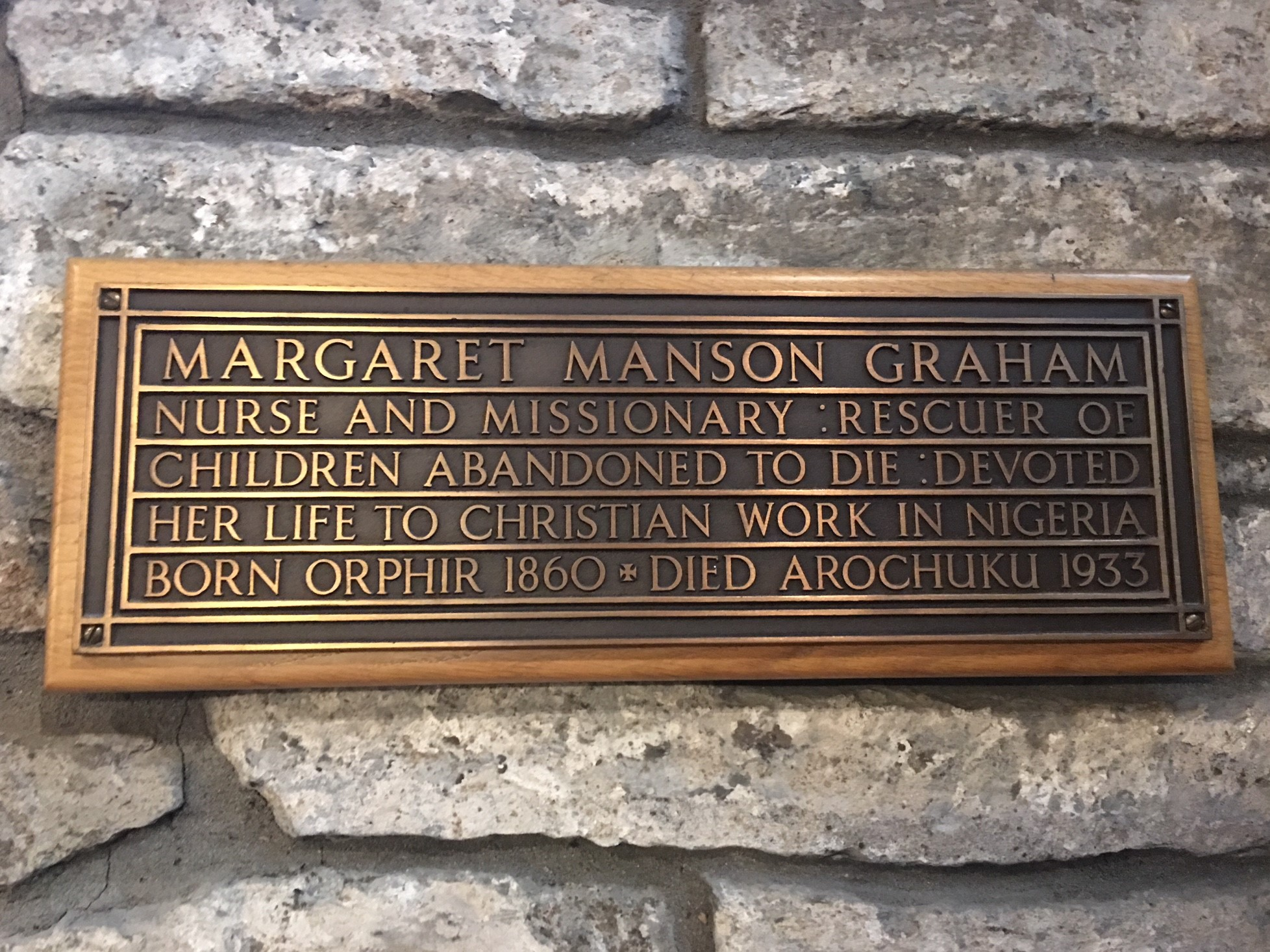
Margaret Manson Graham memorial in Kirkwall Cathedral, Orkney
