= St Boniface's Church, Papa Westray =

Historic church located on the island of Papa Westray, Orkney, Scotland

Coordinates: 59°21′27″N 2°54′07″W

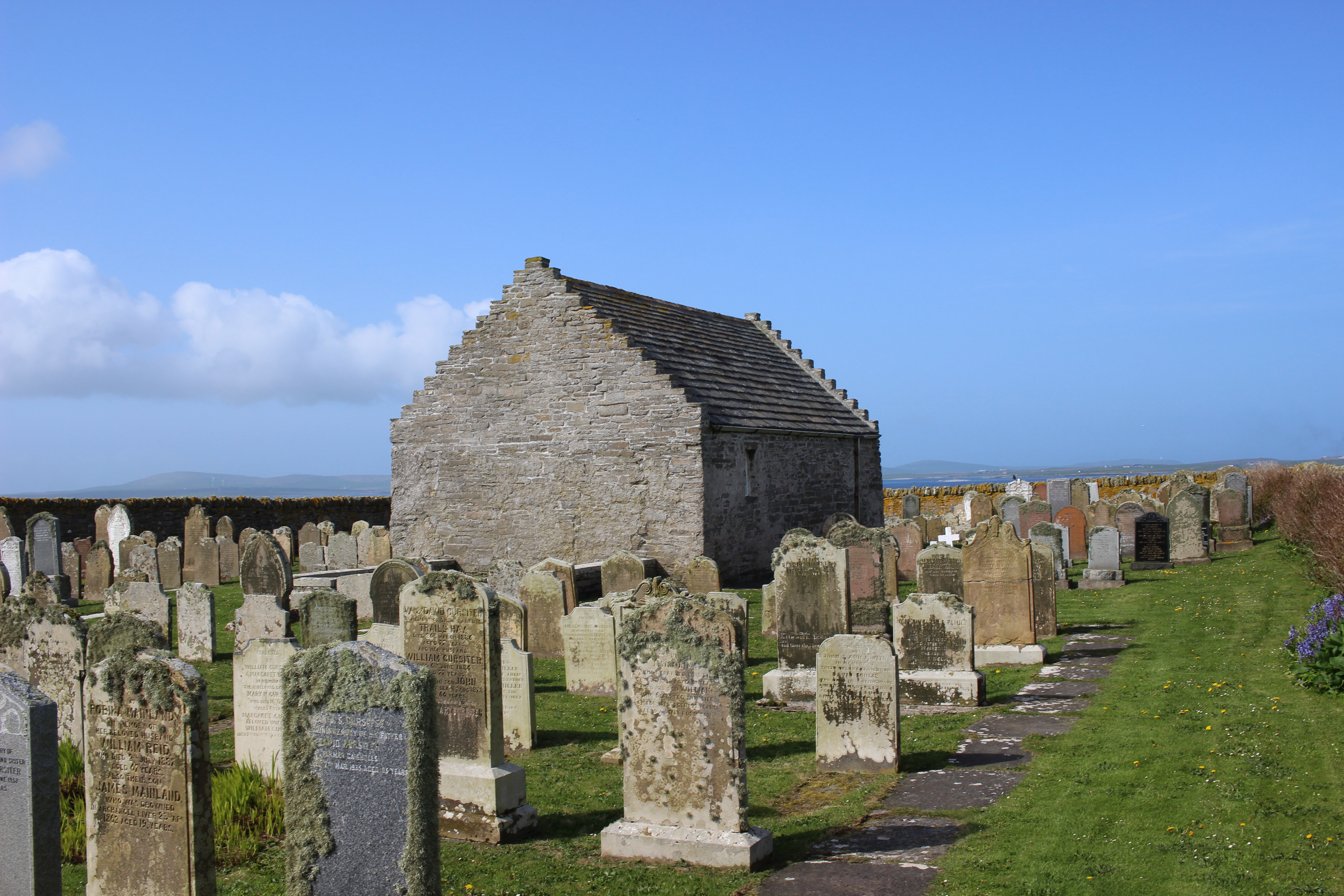
St Boniface's Church

St Boniface's Church, Papa Westray is a historic church and graveyard located on the island of Papa Westray in Orkney, Scotland. The site of the church dates back to the Iron Age and was possibly used later as a Christian monastery. The present church was built in the 12th century and was remodeled in 1710. A 12th-century Norse hogback gravestone lies to the east of the church. Two Pictish cross-slabs were uncovered in the graveyard in the 20th century, and were later moved to museums. Historic Environment Scotland established the site as a scheduled monument in 1959.

== Description ==
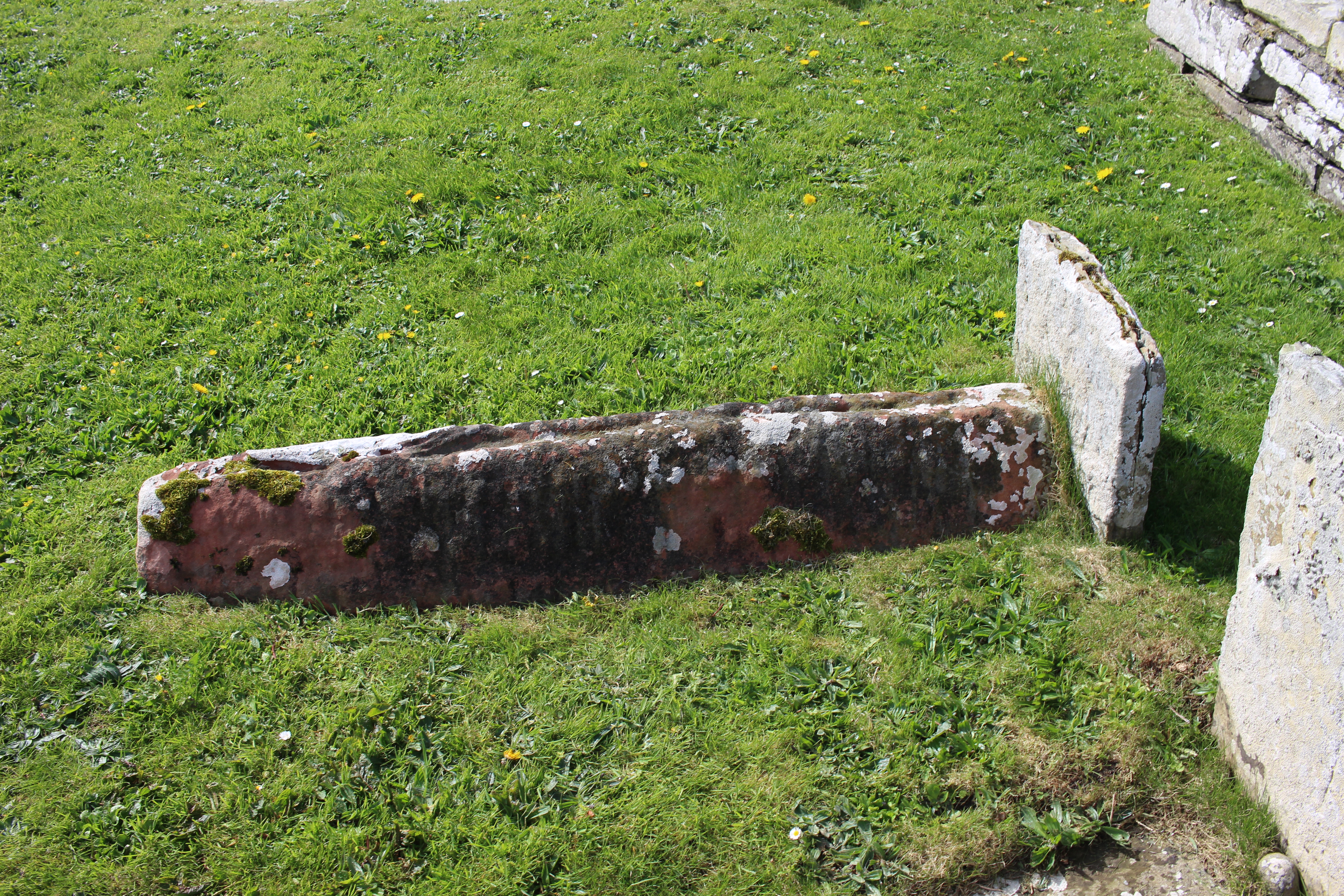
Hogback grave, St Boniface's burial ground

St Boniface's Church is located on the west coast of the island of Papa Westray in Orkney, Scotland. The church is a small rectangular building made of harled rubble. It is single-storied with stepped gables and a slate roof. St Olaf's was built by the Norse in the 12th century. It originally contained a small nave and chancel. The building was expanded westward (around 2.4 m (7 ft 10 in) in 1710, to make room for an interior gallery that was accessed by an external stairway. The chancel was replaced at some unknown date with a family burial-place for the Traill family of Holland House, Papa Westray. The church was repaired in 1843 and restored 150 years later in 1993.

A rubble boundary wall encloses the burial ground, which contains gravestones, most from the 19th century. A 12th-century hogback gravestone lies in the graveyard on the east side of the church. It is made from red sandstone, and is approximately 1.5 m (4 ft 11 in) in length and 0.4 m (1 ft 4 in) in width. The top of the stone is the only visible evidence of the grave. The sides of the stone are decorated with an engraved shingle pattern, a typical characteristic of hogback sculpture. Two cross-slabs were uncovered in the cemetery in the 20th century. They were later moved to museums in Scotland.

== History ==
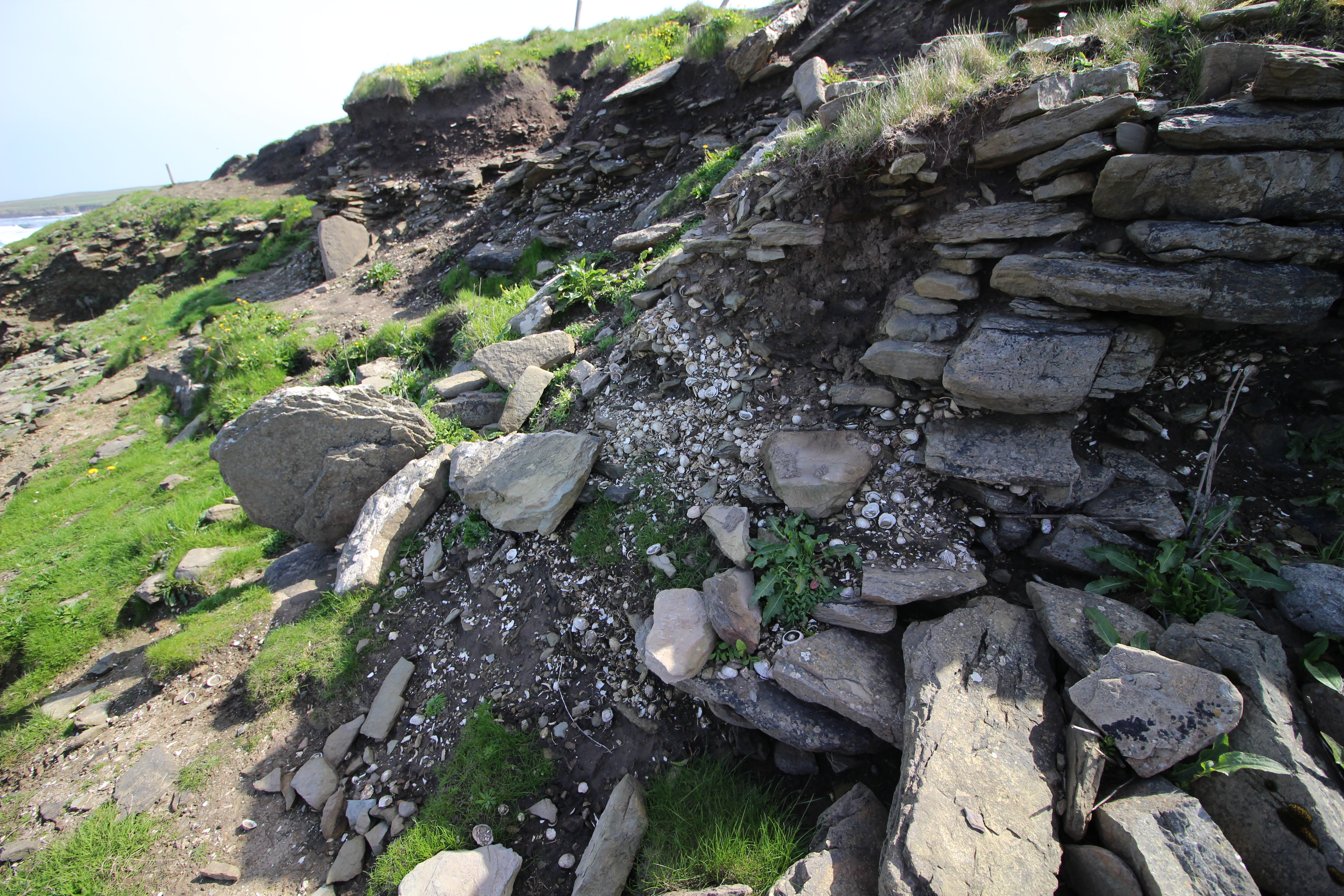
Remains of Munkerhoose settlement

There is evidence of human occupation at the site during the Iron Age, around the 6th century BC. This large Iron Age settlement, which included a roundhouse, continued until 1000 AD. A Christian monastery was probably established at the site 200 years later during the 8th century. There were no visible remains of the early religious settlement in later years, except for the two Pictish cross-slabs uncovered in the graveyard in the 20th century, and the area's place name of Munkerhoose (monk's house). The importance of the island as an important religious centre in the medieval era is suggested by the information revealed in the Orkneyinga Saga of an earl that was buried in Papa Westray in the middle of the 11th century.

In 1920, as the north side of the church was being used for the first time for burials, a Pictish cross-slab was uncovered. The base of the slab was left in the ground, and the rest of the slab was given to the National Museum of Scotland in Edinburgh. A second slab was uncovered in the graveyard near the northeast corner of the church in 1966. The stone carving was donated to the Tankerness House Museum, which is now The Orkney Museum in Kirkwall.

St Boniface's Church was in continuous use until 1920, and abandoned ten years later in 1930. Historic Environment Scotland established the site as a scheduled monument in 1959. The scheduled area covers the underground remains of the church and a portion of the graveyard including the hogback stone. The church today is used from time to time and was added as a Category A listed building in 1971.

== See also ==
- Lady Kirk
- Westside Church
- St Magnus Church, Birsay
- List of churches in Orkney
