= Lady Kirk =

Historic church ruins located on the island of Westray in Orkney, Scotland

Coordinates: 59.3220°N 2.9865°W

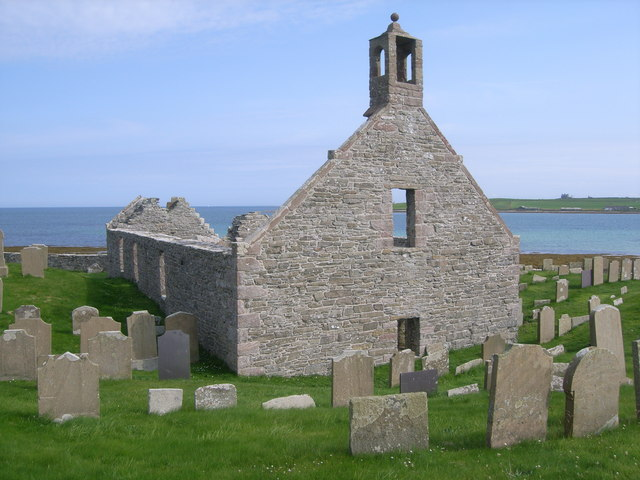
Lady Kirk, Pierowall, Westray

The Lady Kirk (or St Mary's Kirk) at Pierowall is a ruined 17th-century church on the island of Westray, in Orkney, Scotland. The church was built in 1674, on the foundations of the 13th-century church. Two 17th-century grave-slabs, in excellent condition, are set into the interior wall of the chancel and are now protected by glass screens. The graves display fine lettering and 17th-century images of mortality, engraved in high relief. Historic Environment Scotland established the site as a scheduled monument in 2014.

== Description ==
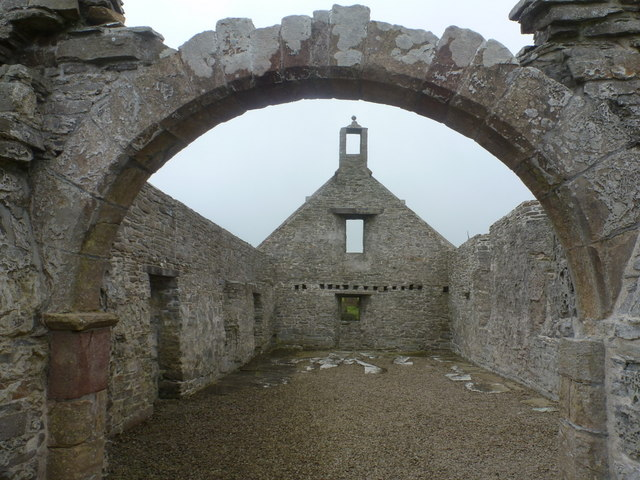
Interior of Lady Kirk

The Lady Kirk was originally built in the 13th century. There is very little that remains of the original medieval building except for the bottom 2.34 m (7 ft 8 in) of the south wall of the nave, the base of the west gable and a portion of the chancel arch. In 1674, the nave was expanded, and the chancel was rebuilt as a "laird's aisle". Between the nave and chancel is a red sandstone arch. The nave was originally 14.5 m (48 ft) by 5.8 m (19 ft), but the remodel expanded the space by 0.5 m (1 ft 8 in). The chancel is now out of alignment with the nave.

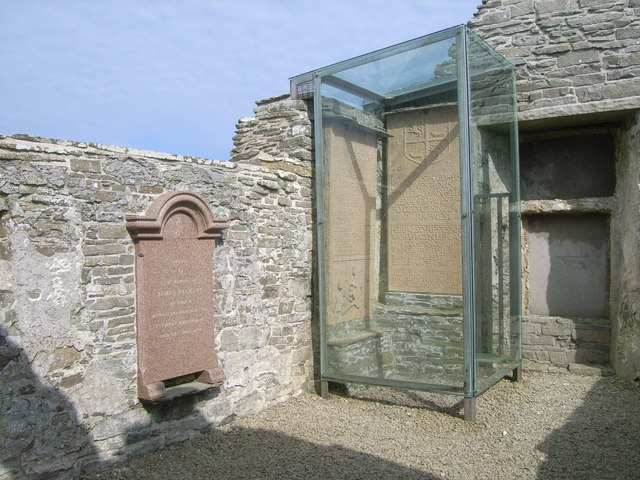
17th-century graves

The date 1674 is inscribed on the lowest stone at eaves level of the east gable. The west gable is topped by a "birdcage" bellcote with a ball finial. The building's masonry is made of rubble with freestone and lime mortar. The oldest sections of the church's walls were mortared with clay. Two 17th-century grave-slabs are set into the interior wall of the chancel ("laird's aisle") and are now protected by glass screens. The slabs are in excellent condition and display lettering and images of mortality, engraved in high relief. The graves in the north wall include those of Michael Balfour, George Balfour (1657) and his wife, Marjorie Baikie (1676). On the east wall is Helen Alexander's grave-slab (1676). The church and surrounding graveyard continued to be used until 1879. Historic Environment Scotland established the site as a scheduled monument in 2014.

== See also ==
- Westside Church
- St Boniface's Church, Papa Westray
- St Olaf's Church, Unst
- St Magnus Church, Birsay
- List of churches in Orkney
