= Rapness =

Coordinates: 59.255°N 2.857°W

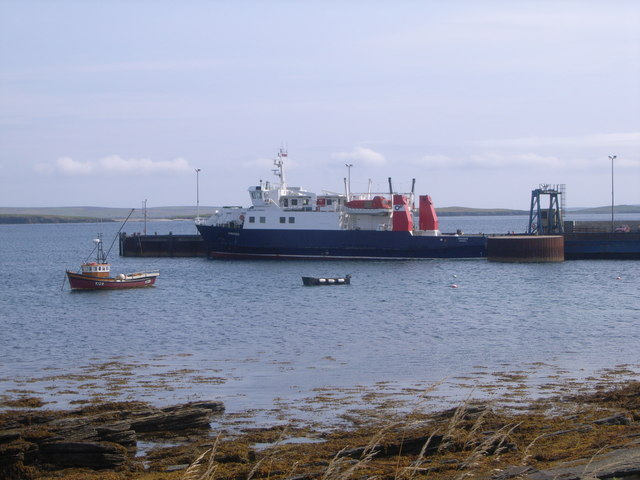
Car ferry at Rapness

Rapness is a settlement on the island of Westray in Orkney, Scotland. The slipway is the ferry terminal for the Orkney Ferries crossing from Kirkwall on the Mainland of Orkney and to/from the nearby island of Papa Westray. The B9066 road runs from Rapness to Pierowall.
