= Tingwall, Orkney =

Coordinates: 59°05′21″N 3°03′04″W

Tingwall
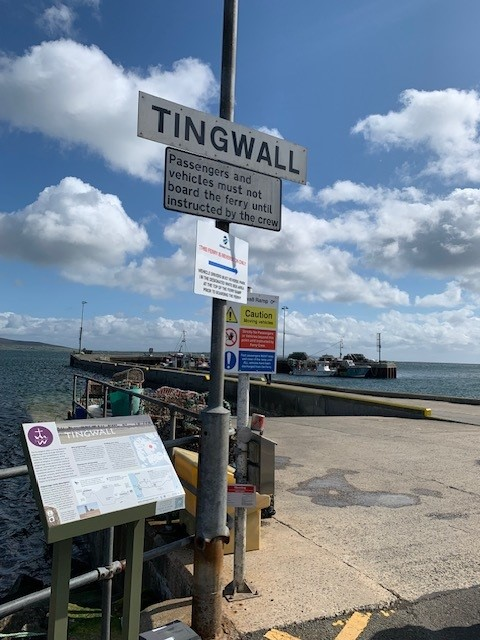
- Tingwall Harbour

- Location within Orkney
- Civil parish: Evie and Rendall
- Council area: Orkney Islands
- Country: Scotland
- Sovereign state: United Kingdom
- Police: Scotland
- Fire: Scottish
- Ambulance: Scottish

Tingwall is a farm and ferry terminal that lies on the north-east coast of Orkney's West Mainland on the Gairsay Sound in the parish of Evie and Rendall. There is a ferry connection to the islands of Wyre, Rousay and Egilsay.

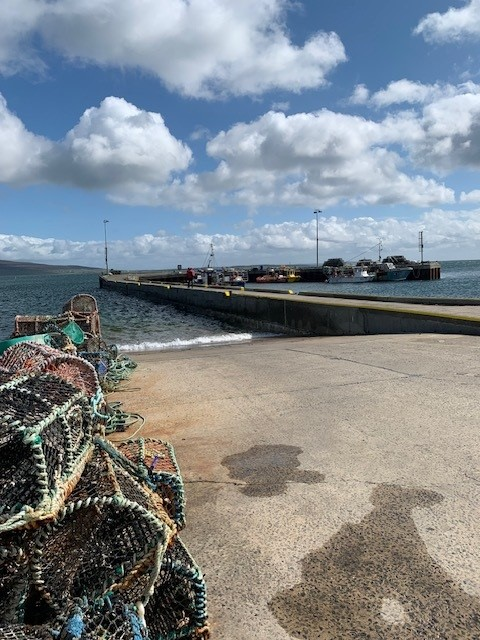
Lobster pots on the harbour at Tingwall, Orkney

The harbour was built in the 1980s and is used by fishing vessels.

The name is derived from Old Norse. Recorded as Á Þingavoll in the Orkneyinga saga and as "Tyngwell" in 1492, the first syllable þing indicates the site of a legislative or judicial assembly. The second syllable, (at least in the case of similar examples such as Dingwall) may have been vollr meaning field. A ruined broch nearby may have been the place of assembly although there are no written records of meetings at Tingwall. It may have fallen out of use and have been replaced by an assembly at Kirkwall.

Tingwall is home to the Fernvalley Wildlife Centre.
