= Pierowall =

Coordinates: 59.31°N 3.00°W

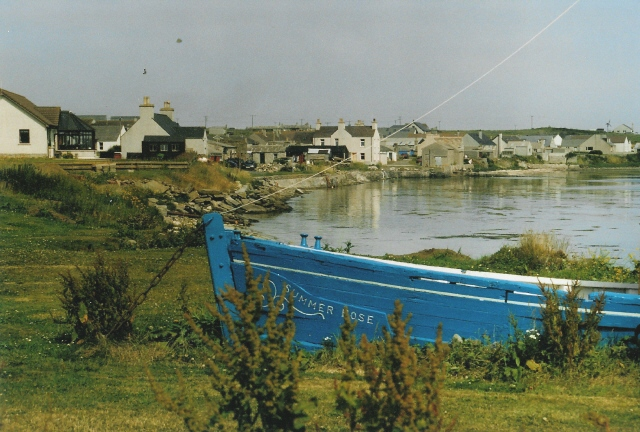
- The bay at Pierowall

- Location within Orkney
- Population: 570
- OS grid reference: HY4348
- Civil parish: Westray
- Council area: Orkney
- Lieutenancy area: Orkney
- Country: Scotland
- Sovereign state: United Kingdom
- Post town: Orkney
- Postcode district: KW17
- Dialling code: 01857
- Police: Scotland
- Fire: Scottish
- Ambulance: Scottish
- UK Parliament: Orkney and Shetland
- Scottish Parliament: Orkney

Pierowall is a village of Westray in the Orkney Islands, off the coast of the northern Scottish mainland. The village is the island's largest settlement and lies near its northern end, around Pierowall Bay. It has a variety of historical remains dating from the Neolithic, the Iron Age, the Middle Ages, and later, including a large pagan Norse cemetery. In 1961 it had a population of 108.

== Facilities ==
Although it is only a village on an island which had a total population of 563 at the census of 2001, Pierowall has a post office, a bank, a junior high school, shops, a hotel, a chippy, and a fire station.

== Communications ==
Supplementing the ferries which come into Pierowall Harbour, some seven miles to the south of the village is the main ferry terminal at Rapness, on the southernmost tip of Westray, which has better ferry links with Papa Westray and Kirkwall.

Pierowall has a maritime climate, with cool summers, mild winters, strong winds, and above average rainfall. Visitors can stay in the centre of the village at the Pierowall Hotel.

== Heritage ==
In a Neolithic chambered cairn near the village, complex carving can be seen on a stone which was probably a lintel. This is thought to originate in the same culture which produced similar carvings at Newgrange in County Meath, Ireland. Pierowall also has an important example of the circular dry-stone Atlantic roundhouses which date from the Iron Age.

Away to the west are the ruins of Noltland Castle, built by Gilbert Balfour in the 16th century, notable for its massive spiral staircase "second only to Fyvie Castle, while its triple tiers of gunloops are without parallel in Scotland, if not Europe".

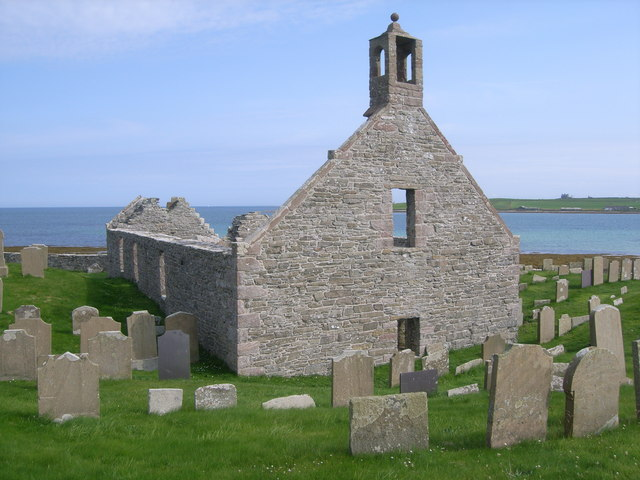
The Lady Kirk

The Lady Kirk, a ruined church built in 1674 on the foundations of an older 13th-century church, is one of two ruined churches on the island of Westray and is a scheduled monument in the care of Historic Environment Scotland. Other listed structures include Trenabie Bere Mill and Pierowall Harbour's Gill Pier, which was built in 1870.

The Westray Heritage Centre stands at the heart of the village, which also has an art gallery.

== Archaeology ==
Ninth-century Viking graves have been found and excavated among sand dunes near Pierowall, and finds of grave-goods there include weapons, a gold arm-ring, keys, combs, and a penannular brooch which combines the styles of Celtic and Viking art.

The local development plan notes that Pierowall is the location of "the largest pagan Norse cemetery to be found in Britain" and comments that "Any developments should take into account the likely presence of archaeology."
