= Orphir =

Village and parish on Orkney, Scotland

Coordinates: 58°56′N 3°9′W

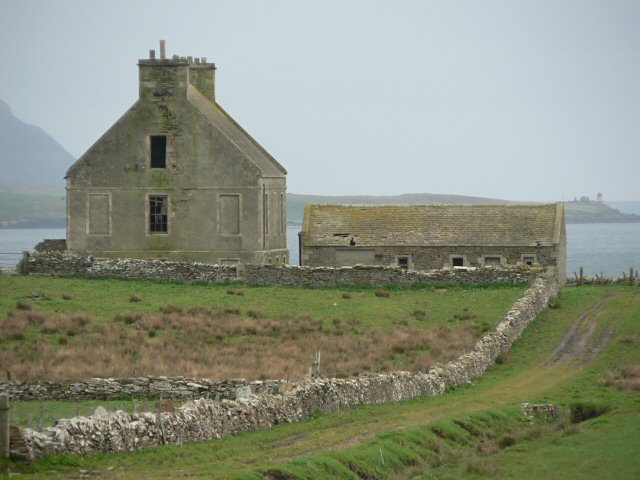
The Hall of Clestrain, birthplace of John Rae, and currently derelict

Orphir (pronounced /ɔːrfɪr/, Old Norse: Jorfjara or Orfjara) is a parish and settlement on Mainland, Orkney, Scotland.

It is approximately 9 miles (14 kilometres) southwest of Kirkwall, and comprises a seaboard tract of about 7 by 3 1/2 mi (11.5 by 5.5 km), and includes Cava and the Holm of Houton. The coast includes Houton Head, about 300 feet (90 metres) tall, but all elsewhere is nearly level; and the interior is an assemblage of vales and hills, the latter culminating at about 700 ft (210 m) above sea level.

A chief residence was the Hall of Clestrain; and chief antiquities include the ruins of Earl Paul's Palace, remains of pre-Reformation chapels, the Round Kirk and several tumuli.

The ferry terminal of Houton is located in Orphir. The ferries to Flotta and Hoy (Lyness) depart from this point. Ramsdale Shooting Range is also located in Orphir.

== Notable people ==
- John Rae (1813–1893), the explorer of Canada's Arctic was born at the Hall of Clestrain in this parish.
- Henry Halcro Johnston, botanist and international rugby union player was born and died at Orphir.
- Jamie Halcro Johnston, Scottish Conservative MSP, was brought up at Orphir.
- Margaret Manson Graham (1860–1933), missionary nurse in Nigeria, born in Orphir.
- John Gerard Anderson (1836–1911), Australian educationist
