= Egilsay =

One of the Orkney Islands in Scotland

?Eaglais (see meaning) (Gaelic); Egilsay (Scots)
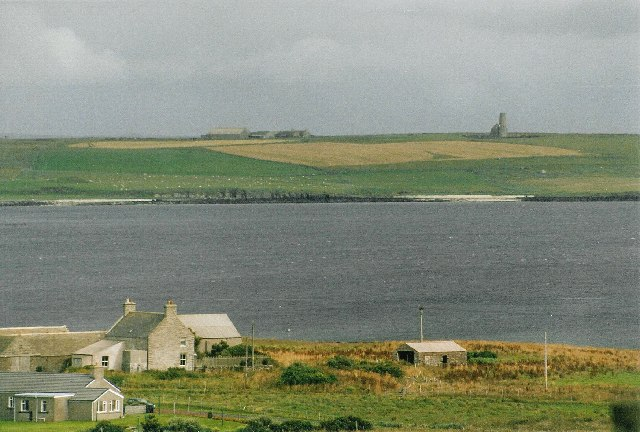
- Egilsay from Rousay with St Magnus Church on the skyline

Location
- Egilsay shown within Orkney
- OS grid reference: HY470301
- Coordinates: 59.15°N 2.916°W

Name
- Name meaning: Disputed – either Norse "Egil's island" or Norse "ey" + Celtic "eaglais" – "Church island"
- Old Norse name: Egilsey

Physical geography
- Island group: Orkney Islands
- Area: 650 hectares (1,600 acres)
- Area rank: 67
- Highest elevation: 35 m (115 ft)

Administration
- Council area: Orkney
- Country: Scotland
- Sovereign state: United Kingdom

Demographics
- Population: 17
- Population rank: 62=
- Population density: 2.6/km^{2}
- Largest settlement: Skaill
- References: www.aroundrousay.co.uk/egilsay.shtml

Egilsay (/ˈɛɡɪlsiː/, Scots: Egilsay) is one of the Orkney Islands in Scotland, lying east of Rousay. The anglicized name of Eagleshay was used in past centuries. The island is largely farmland and is known for St Magnus Church, dedicated or re-dedicated to Saint Magnus, who was killed on the island in 1117 by an axe blow to the head. For hundreds of years the story of St Magnus, part of the Orkneyinga saga, was considered just a legend until a skull with a large crack in it, such as it had been stricken by an axe, was found in the walls of St Magnus Cathedral in Kirkwall.

== Etymology ==
Unusually for the Northern Isles, it has been suggested that Egilsay may have a partly Gaelic name. While at first sight, it appears to be Egil's island, "Egil" being a Norse personal name, the Gaelic eaglais (Celtic "eccles") meaning church, may be part of the root, as the island is dominated by a church of pre-Norse foundation. The island of Kili Holm just to the north, may represent cille, a monastic cell.

== Present day ==
The island's population was 26 as recorded by the 2011 census a drop of almost a third since 2001 when there were 37 usual residents. During the same period, Scottish island populations as a whole grew by 4% to 103,702. By 2022 the population had declined to 17.

Orkney Ferries sail from the island to Tingwall on the Orkney Mainland via Wyre and Rousay.

In October 2025, the Egilsay Community Association was awarded funding from the Scottish Land Fund (SLF) to acquire the community centre and adjoining school house from Orkney Islands Council through a negotiated sale. The success of the buyout allows the only public building on the island to be run and managed by the community.

== See also ==
- Sir Alexander Douglas of Eagleshay
