= Orphir Round Church =

Church remains in Orphir, Orkney, Scotland

Coordinates: 58°55′19″N 3°09′24″W

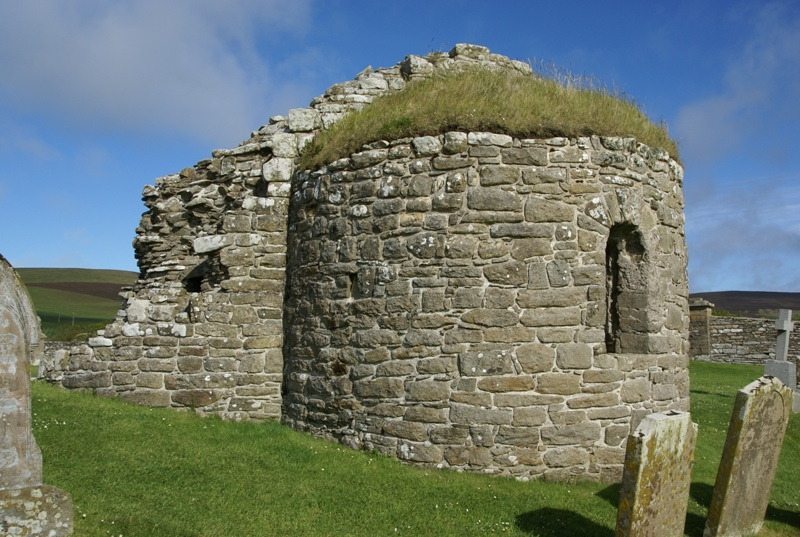
The Round Kirk, showing the outside of the apse

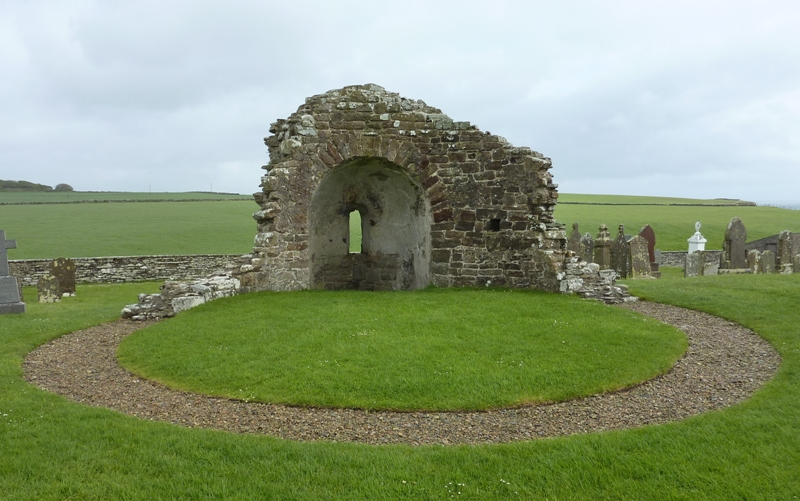
The gravel shows the outline of the circular nave

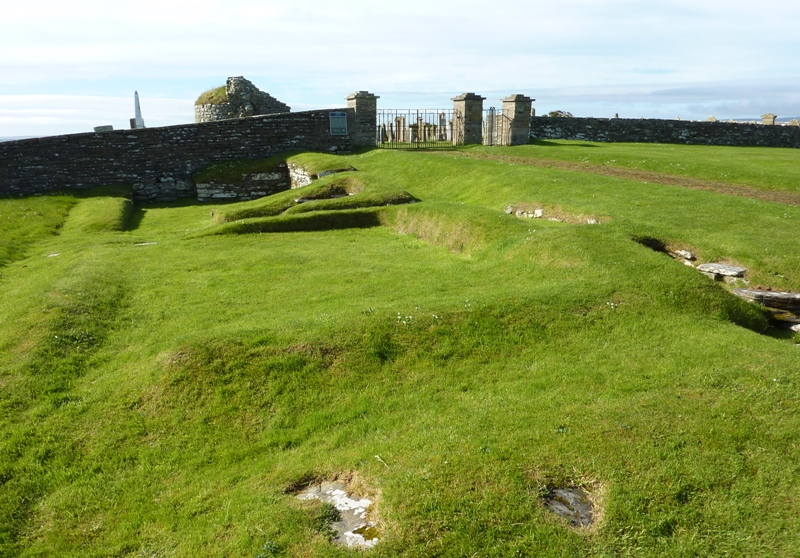
The Earl's Bu, with the church behind

The remains of the Orphir Round Church (or Round Kirk), also St Nicholas's Church, are located in Orphir Parish on the Mainland, Orkney, Scotland. It has been part of a scheduled monument since 2014.

== Description ==
The church, dedicated to Saint Nicholas, consisted of a barrel-vaulted apse on the eastern side of its 6-metre-wide (20 ft) circular nave. It consisted of a circular nave about six metres in diameter and a semicircular apse with a central window. The walls are one metre thick.

== History ==
It is thought to have been built by jarl (earl) Haakon Paulsson (Earl of Orkney from 1103 to 1123) as penance for murdering his cousin and co-ruler Magnus Erlendsson (later Saint Magnus) in the late 11th or early 12th century. According to the Orkneyinga saga, earl Haakon took sole power in 1117 after the killing of Magnus, and the round kirk was later rededicated to St Magnus. The saga refers to a "large drinking-hall" with a "magnificent church" nearby. The remains of the drinking hall, known as the 'Earl's Bu', can still be seen, as well as an 11th-century Norse horizontal watermill.

It is the oldest surviving round church in Scotland; the only other round medieval church in Scotland is found at Roxburgh near the English border. The building's design was inspired by the Church of the Holy Sepulchre in Jerusalem and the circular churches became a popular design with returning crusaders attempting to copy the famous structure.

== Modern church ==
Almost the whole church survived until 1757, when most of it was demolished to provide stone for the new parish kirk, which has also now been demolished. Only the apse and a small segment of the round kirk's nave wall now survive. The site is now in the care of Historic Environment Scotland and is open to the public. The remains are protected as a scheduled monument.

== Archaeology ==
Geophysical surveys have proved to not be very effective in investigating the remains of the church but excavations have been more effective in understanding the history and development of the church.

== Images ==
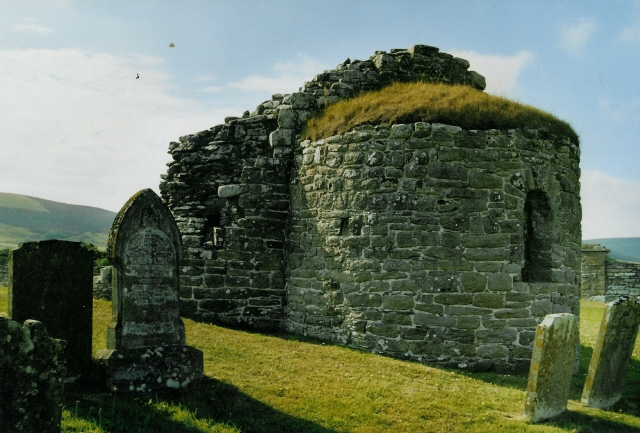

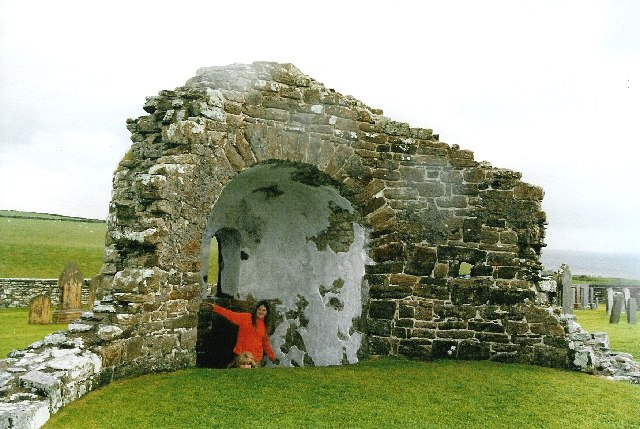

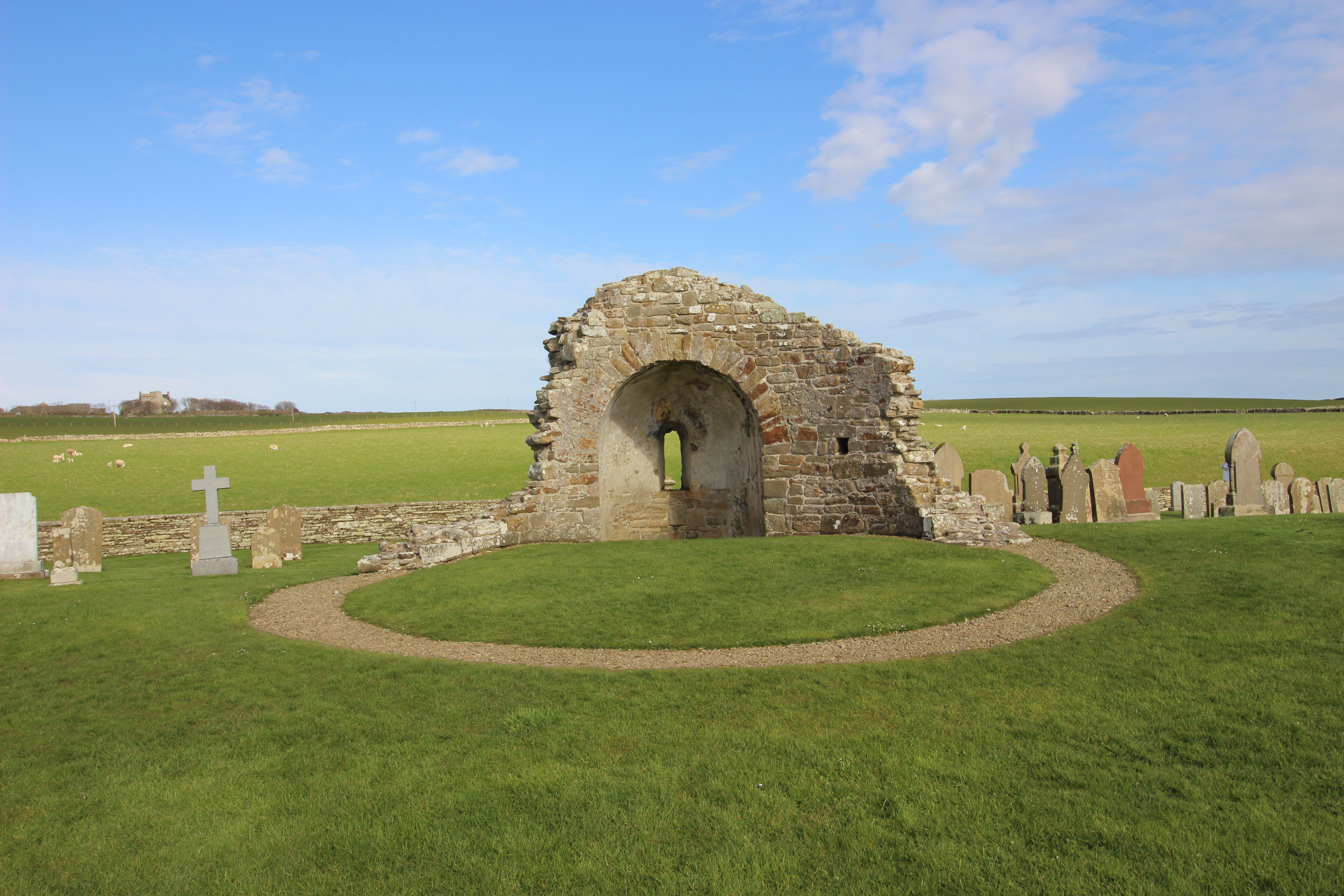
