= St Olaf's Church, Unst =

Medieval church located on the island of Unst in Shetland, Scotland

Coordinates: 60°42′56.1″N 0°57′49.3″W

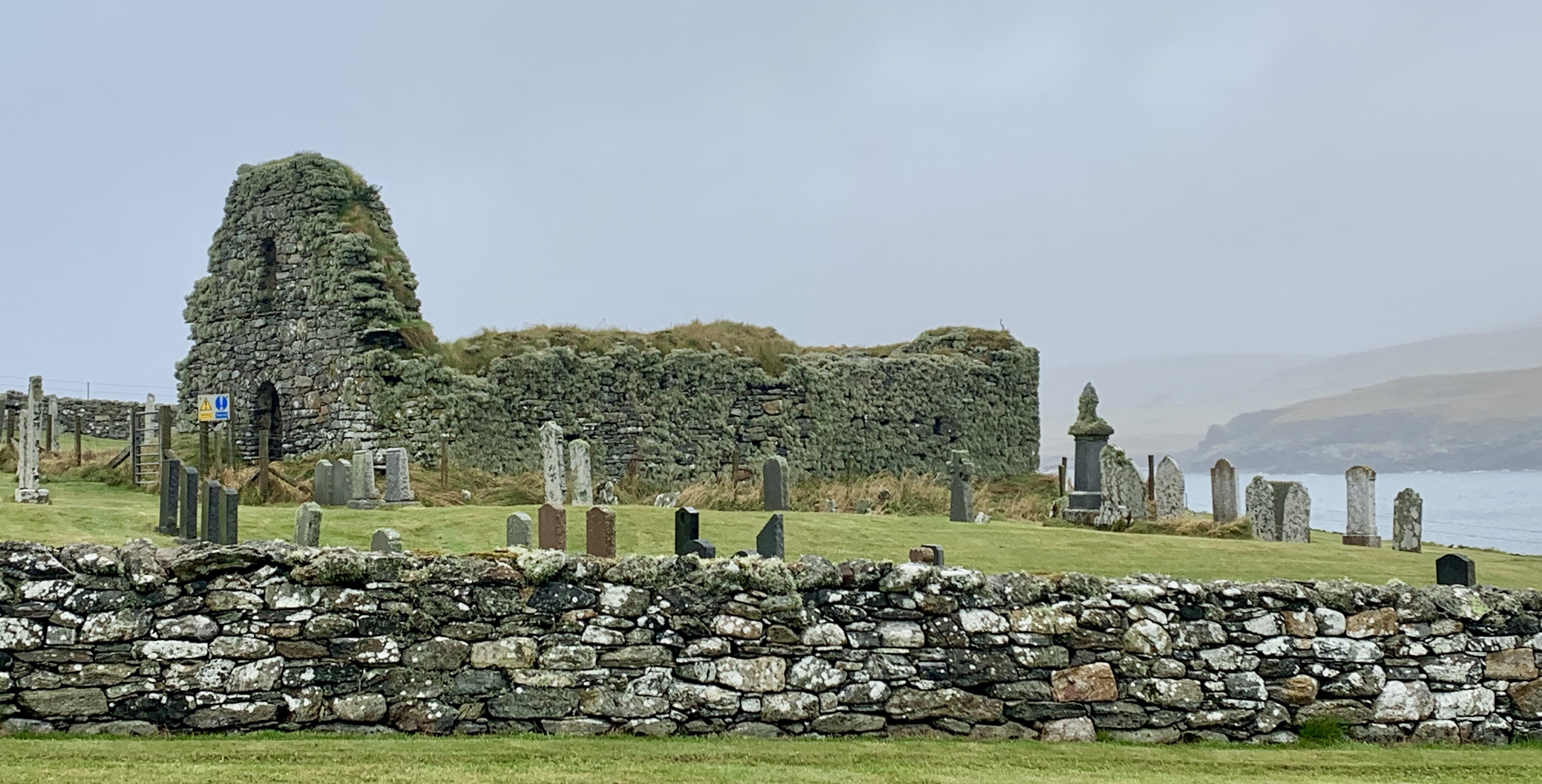
St Olaf's Church and cemetery

St Olaf's Church, Unst is a ruined medieval church located on the island of Unst, in Shetland, Scotland, UK. The church was built in the Celtic style, and dates to the twelfth century. The burial ground surrounding the church includes several early medieval stone crosses. Historic Environment Scotland first listed the site as a scheduled monument in 1957.

== Description ==
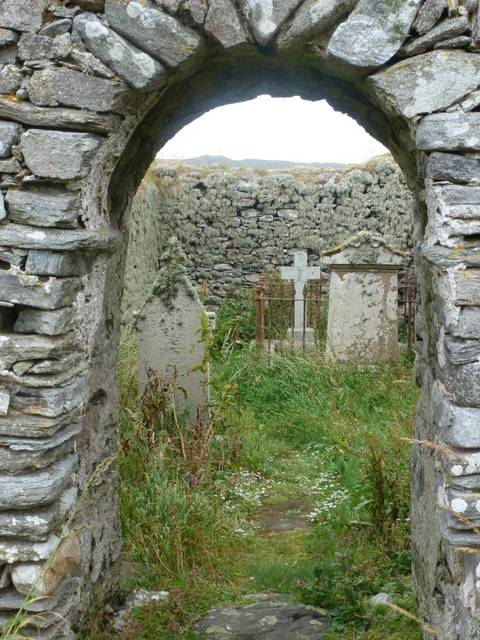
Inside St Olaf's Church

The ruins of St Olaf's church are located 0.5 km (0.31 mi) northwest of the hamlet of Lund, on the island of Unst in the Shetland Islands, UK. The roofless building is a single-chamber rectangular structure, measuring 14.5 m (48 ft) by 6.76 m (22.2 ft). The thickness of the walls range from 1.1 m (3 ft 7 in) to 1.37 m (4 ft 6 in). Approximately 5.19 m (17.0 ft) of the eastern section of the building has been rebuilt. The fabric of the building is made of local rubble in lime mortar, and is in poor condition. It has been determined that the church was built in the twelfth century and was in use until 1785.

A covered-up rectangular doorway at the west end of the south wall of the church can still be seen. The current entrance, an arched doorway, is located in the west gable. The church was built in the Celtic style, with its characteristic inclined jambs. The interior of the church contains memorials to the Mouat family and a 1573 stone slab marking the grave of Segebad Detkin. A decorative carving of either a fish or serpent on a lintel over one of the windows was created before the stone's current use in the church. The graveyard surrounding the church has expanded over the years and is still in use. It includes eight small stone crosses dating from the ninth to the twelfth centuries. Historic Environment Scotland first listed the site as a scheduled monument in 1957.

== See also ==
- Eynhallow Church
- St Magnus Church, Egilsay
- St Oran's Chapel
