= Magnus Erlendsson, Earl of Orkney =

Earl of Orkney from 1106 to c. 1117

Magnus Erlendsson
- Earl of Orkney
- St. Magnus statue in Nidaros Cathedral (Trondheim, Norway)
- Tenure: 1106–1117
- Other names: Magnus the Martyr
- Born: 1080
- Died: 16 April 1117 (aged 36–37); Egilsay, Orkney Islands, Norway
- Parents: Erlend Thorfinnsson and Thora, daughter of Sumarlidi Ospaksson

Saint Magnus of Orkney
- Venerated in: Catholic Church; Anglican Communion; Church of Norway; Church of Sweden
- Canonized: 11 July 1898 (cultus confirmation) by Pope Leo XIII
- Feast: 16 April
- Attributes: Viking clothing, axe
- Patronage: Orkney

Saint Magnus Erlendsson, Earl of Orkney (1080 – 16 April 1117), sometimes known as Magnus the Martyr, was Earl of Orkney from 1106 to about 1117.

Flag of St Magnus; the unofficial predecessor to the modern Flag of Orkney

Magnus's grandparents, Thorfinn the Mighty, Jarl of Orkney and his wife Ingibiorg Finnsdottir, had two sons, Erlend and Paul, who were twins. Through Ingibiorg's father Finn Arnesson and his wife, the family was related to the Norwegian Kings Olav II and Harald II.

== Sources ==
Magnus's story is told in three Norse sagas: Orkneyinga saga (chapters 34–57); Magnús saga skemmri; and Magnús saga lengri.

The Orkneyinga Saga was first written down around the year 1200, some 80–90 years after the death of Magnus, by an unknown Icelandic author. An abridgement of the Magnús saga skemmri (the "Shorter Saga of Magnus") makes up chapters 39–55 of the Orkneyinga Saga. Magnús saga lengri (the "Longer Saga of Magnus") contains additions to the original by a "Meistari Roðbert" ("Master Rodbert") dated to the period 1136–70. Robert of Cricklade is believed to be the original Latin author of these additions. Of the three texts Vigfusson (1887) considers the shorter saga to be the "best authority", noting that it is "of ecclesiastical origin" and "composed with pious intent" rather than to "satisfy a love of good tales". As is commonly the case for medieval saints' tales a short book of miracles is appended to both the shorter and longer lives, although they contain somewhat different material. There is also a surviving Latin account of Magnus's life, the Legenda de sancto Magno, and other material in the Brevarium Aberdonense of 1509/10, no doubt based on the missing Vita by the above magister Rodbert - part of which is included in the Magnús saga lengri.

== Biography ==
=== Family background ===
Magnus was the first son of Erlend Thorfinnsson, Earl of Orkney (who ruled jointly with his brother Paul) and Thora, a daughter of Sumarlidi Ospaksson. They had one other son, Aerling, and two daughters, Gunnhild and Cecilia. Erlend also had a natural daughter called Jaddvor. (Note: Sellar (2000) argues that a degree of polygamy appears to have been acceptable among high-status families in Norse Scotland and that the distinction between wives and concubines may not have been rigid.) Paul and Erlend remained on friendly terms until their children grew to adulthood, due to the rivalry between Haakon Paulsson and Aerling Erlendsson. Both are described as talented but also quarrelsome and arrogant. Magnus, by contrast, was "a quiet sort of man".

Haakon believed himself to be the most highly-born of the cousins and wanted to be seen as the foremost amongst his kin, but Aerling was not one to back down. The fathers did their best to reach a settlement but it became clear that they were both favouring their own offspring and eventually the earldom was divided into two distinct territories.

=== Norwegian influence ===
Haakon Paalsson went on a long journey to Scandinavia, with his cousin Ofeig, latterly staying with his kinsman, Magnus Barefoot the king of Norway. Whilst there he heard that his father Paal had largely handed over control of Orkney to Earl Erlend and his sons and that after a substantial period of peace the people of Orkney were not keen to see Haakon returning. He therefore asked King Magnus for help in the hope of obtaining the earldom for himself. Haakon suggested to the king that he take back direct control of Orkney as a base for raiding further afield. Magnus was persuaded and in 1098 he launched a major campaign, taking his 8-year-old son Sigurd with him. However, King Magnus had designs that were not envisaged by Haakon. He took possession of the islands, deposing both Erlend and Paal Thorfinsson who were sent away to Norway as prisoners, Haakon and his cousins Magnus and Aerling Erlendsson were taken by King Magnus as hostages and Sigurd was installed as the nominal earl. Sigurd's rule was aided by a council, with Haakon as a member of this group.

From Orkney, King Magnus then set out on a raiding expedition along the west coast of Scotland and into the Irish Sea.

=== Battle of Menai Straits ===
According to the Orkneyinga Saga, Magnus had a reputation for piety and gentleness. He refused to fight in a Viking raid in Anglesey, Wales, because of his religious convictions, and instead stayed on board the ship during the Battle of Menai Straits, singing psalms. His brother Aerling died while campaigning with King Magnus, either at that same battle or in Ulster.

Magnus was obliged to take refuge in Scotland, but returned to Orkney in 1105 and disputed the succession with his cousin Haakon. Having failed to reach an agreement, he sought help from King Eystein I of Norway, who granted him the earldom of Orkney and he ruled jointly and amicably with Haakon until 1114.

=== Execution ===
Eventually however, the followers of the two earls fell out, and the sides met at the Thing (assembly) on the Orkney mainland, ready to do battle. Peace was negotiated and the Earls arranged to meet each other on the island of Egilsay at Easter, each bringing only two ships. Magnus arrived with his two ships, but then Haakon treacherously turned up with eight ships.

Magnus took refuge in the island's church overnight, but the following day he was captured and offered to go into exile or prison, but an assembly of chieftains, tired of joint rule, insisted that one earl must die. Haakon's standard bearer, Ofeigr, refused to execute Magnus, and an angry Haakon made his cook Lifolf kill Magnus by striking him on the head with an axe. It was said that Magnus first prayed for the souls of his executioners.

According to the sagas, the martyrdom took place after Easter, on 16 April. The year is often given as 1115, but this is impossible as 16 April fell before Easter that year. Sigurd Towrie follows Orkney Historian Gregor Lamb in placing the death of Magnus in 1118. The best authorities now give the date at 1117 and his 900th anniversary was commemorated in his Cathedral in Kirkwall in Orkney in 2017.

=== Burial ===
Magnus was first buried on the spot where he died. According to his legend, the rocky area around his grave miraculously became a green field. Later Thora, Magnus' mother, asked Haakon to allow her to bury him in a church. Haakon gave his permission and Magnus was then buried at Christchurch at Birsay.

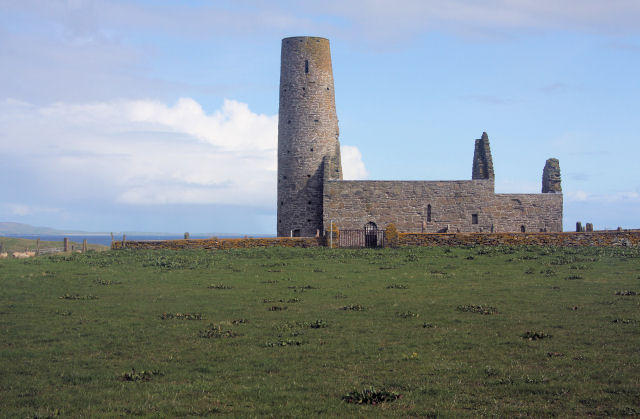
The ruins of St Magnus Church on the island of Egilsay in Orkney

There were numerous reports of miraculous happenings and healings. William the Old, Bishop of Orkney, warned that it was "heresy to go about with such tales" and was then struck blind at his church, but subsequently had his sight restored after praying at the grave of Magnus, not long after visiting Norway (and perhaps meeting Earl Rognvald Kolsson).

In 1136 Bishop William of Orkney sanctified the murdered Earl Magnus, making him Saint Magnus. It is thought probable that St Magnus Church, Egilsay, was constructed on the island shortly afterwards, at or near the supposed site of the murder. This may have replaced an earlier church which could have already been there at the time of the murder of Magnus.

Magnus's nephew, Rögnvald Kali Kolsson, laid claim to the Earldom of Orkney, and was advised by his father Kol to promise the islanders to "build a stone minster at Kirkwall" in memory of his uncle, the Holy Earl, and this became St Magnus Cathedral. When the cathedral, begun in 1137, was ready for consecration, the relics of St Magnus were transferred. On 31 March 1919, during restoration work, a hidden cavity was found in a column, containing a wooden box with bones including a damaged skull. These are held without (much) doubt to be the relics of St Magnus. The remains were replaced in the pillar in 1926, with the location marked with a cross. The box, which is 74.5 cm long, 25.7 cm wide and 17.6 cm high, was made from Scots pine; radiocarbon dating in 2025 showed that "the tree used to construct the box was most likely felled between AD1034 and AD1168.”

== Interpretations ==
At the time the Orkneyinga saga was first written down Haakon Paalsson's grandson, Harald Maddadsson, was Earl of Orkney and the writer of the saga clearly had some difficulty in portraying the kin-slaying of Magnus Erlendsson. Thomson (2008) concludes that the "assembly" that sentenced Magnus was either invented or heavily emphasised in order to "divert some of the blame from Hakon". Furthermore, in reporting on Earl Haakon's death the saga reports that this was "felt to be a great loss, his later years having been very peaceful".

The beatification of members of the nobility who met a violent death was a common tendency in medieval Scandinavian society. In the case of Earl Magnus it also had a political purpose in that it enabled the surviving descendants of Erlend Thorfinsson and their family to turn this death to their advantage in portraying him as a peaceful martyr. Ultimately they succeeded in maintaining their prominent position in Orkney when Rognvald Kali Kolsson, the son of Magnus's sister Gunnhild became earl in 1136.

== In literature and the arts ==
Saint Magnus is the subject of the novel Magnus by Orcadian author George Mackay Brown, which was published in 1973, and St Magnus, Earl of Orkney by John Mooney. In 1977 Peter Maxwell Davies wrote a one-act opera, The Martyrdom of St Magnus, based on Mackay Brown's novel. In 1989 the English composer Clive Strutt who lives on the Orkney island of South Ronaldsay composed THREE HYMNS In Praise of Saint Magnus based on a 12th-century theme existing in Uppsala University, Sweden. The song "Higher Ground" by Rasmussen, which represented Denmark at the Eurovision Song Contest 2018, is based on the legend of Magnus Erlendsson. In 2023 Loganair named one of their Britten-Norman BN-2 Islander (registration G-BLDV) Magnus Erlendsson.

== Affiliations ==
In the Faroes, the St Magnus Cathedral, Kirkjubøur was built around 1300 A.D., at the time of Bishop Erlendur. It is quite sure that the church was used for services (though it never was finished, or has been destroyed later), for estimated relics of Saint Magnus were found here in 1905. Kirkjubøur is one of the most important Faroese historical sites and expected to become a World Heritage Site. In total there are 21 churches in Europe dedicated to St Magnus.

St Magnus the Martyr is a church near the north end of London Bridge in London originally dating to the 12th century, which was reconstructed under the direction of Christopher Wren in the 17th century. However, the church's name may also refer to Magnus of Trani, an Italian martyr of the 2nd century AD.

Other affiliations include:

- TS Magnus, Australian Navy Cadets
- Anglican Church Grammar School in Brisbane, of which he is the patron saint, and also namesake of Magnus house.

Preceded by Haakon Paulsson	Earl of Orkney; 1106–1116^{jointly with Haakon Paulsson}	Succeeded by Haakon Paulsson
