= St Magnus Church, Egilsay =

Ruined medieval church located on the island of Egilsay in Orkney, Scotland

Coordinates: 59°09′25″N 2°56′07″W

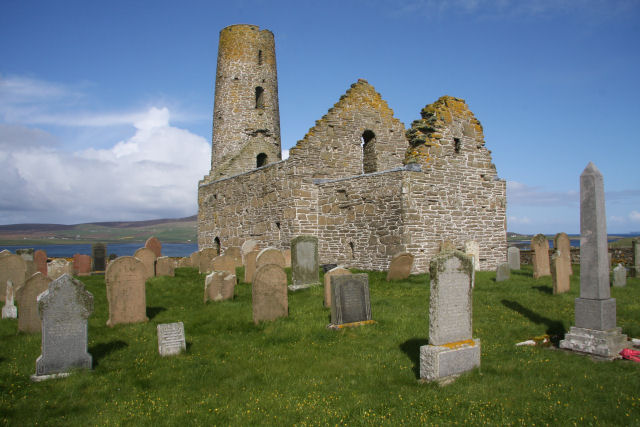
St Magnus Church and graveyard

St Magnus Church is a ruined medieval round-tower church located on the island of Egilsay, in Orkney, Scotland. The site is recognized as the place of execution of Saint Magnus Erlendsson, Earl of Orkney, in the 12th century. The roofless structure dates back to the 12th century, and has been described by Historic Environment Scotland (HES) as second only to St Magnus Cathedral, Kirkwall, as a surviving Norse church in Scotland.

== Description ==
St Magnus's Church is located near the northwest coast of Egilsay in Orkney, Scotland. Egilsay belongs to the three island group of Rousay, Egilsay and Wyre. These islands are also known as the Inner Northern Isles.

The church was built in the Romanesque style, with a rectangular nave, a chancel at the east end and a round tower at the west end. A door leads from the tower to the central nave of the church. The altar was located in the chancel, which opens directly to the nave. The chancel originally had an upper story. Both the nave and the chancel originally had steeply pitched, stone roofs that were taken down by 1847. Windows and doors have rounded arches. The round tower is currently a height of 15 m (49 ft), but it originally would have been around 20 m (66 ft), and four or five stories tall when built. It tapers towards the top. The tower is similar to other round church towers found in northern Germany and countries bordering the North Sea, and Ireland. The site also consists of a graveyard surrounding the church.

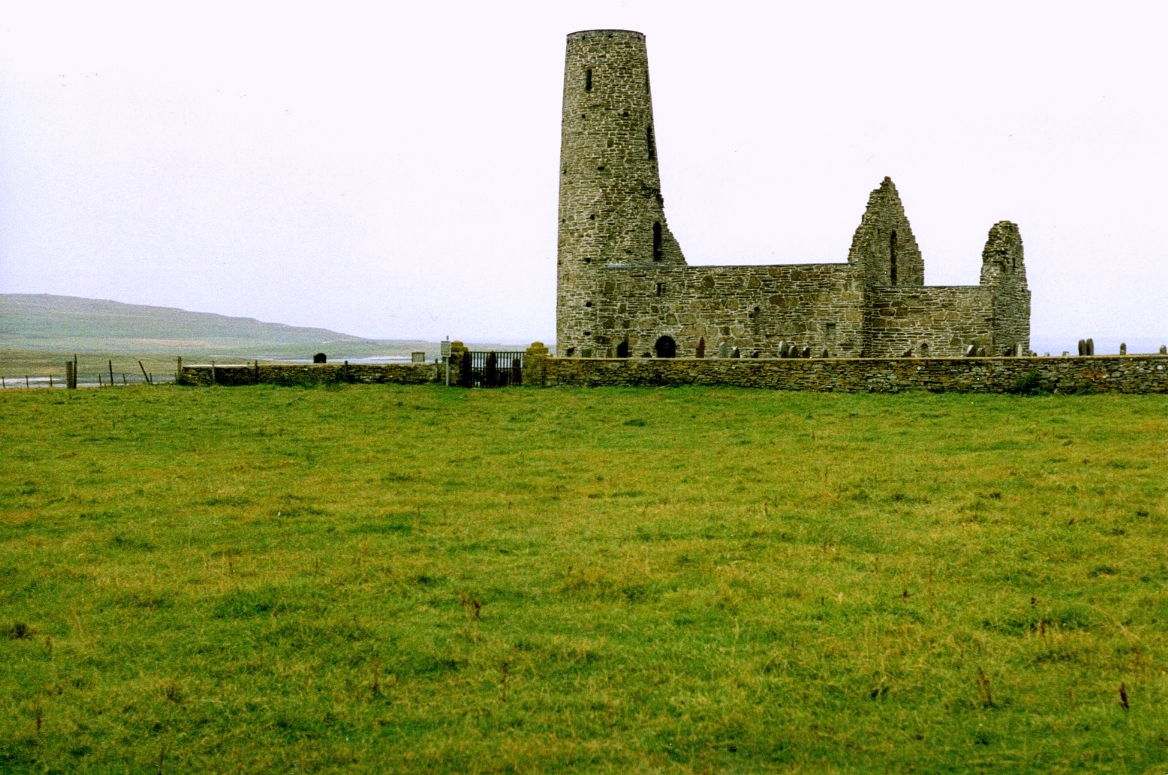
St Magnus Church and graveyard

The site is maintained by Historic Environment Scotland as a scheduled monument. Egilsay is accessible by ferry from Tingwall, and the church is open year-round to visitors.

== History ==
The Orkneyinga saga records that around 1116, Magnus Erlendsson, Earl of Orkney, travelled to the island to resolve a dispute with his rival, Earl Haakon. Magnus spent the night on the island, possibly in a church, and the next day was captured by Haakon and executed. In 1136, Bishop William of Orkney, sanctified the murdered Earl, who became Saint Magnus, and it is thought that the present church was constructed shortly afterwards on the supposed site of the murder. There may have been an earlier church at or near the site before the murder of Magnus. The existing structure is the last surviving of the round-towered churches of the Northern Isles.
