= St Magnus Cathedral =

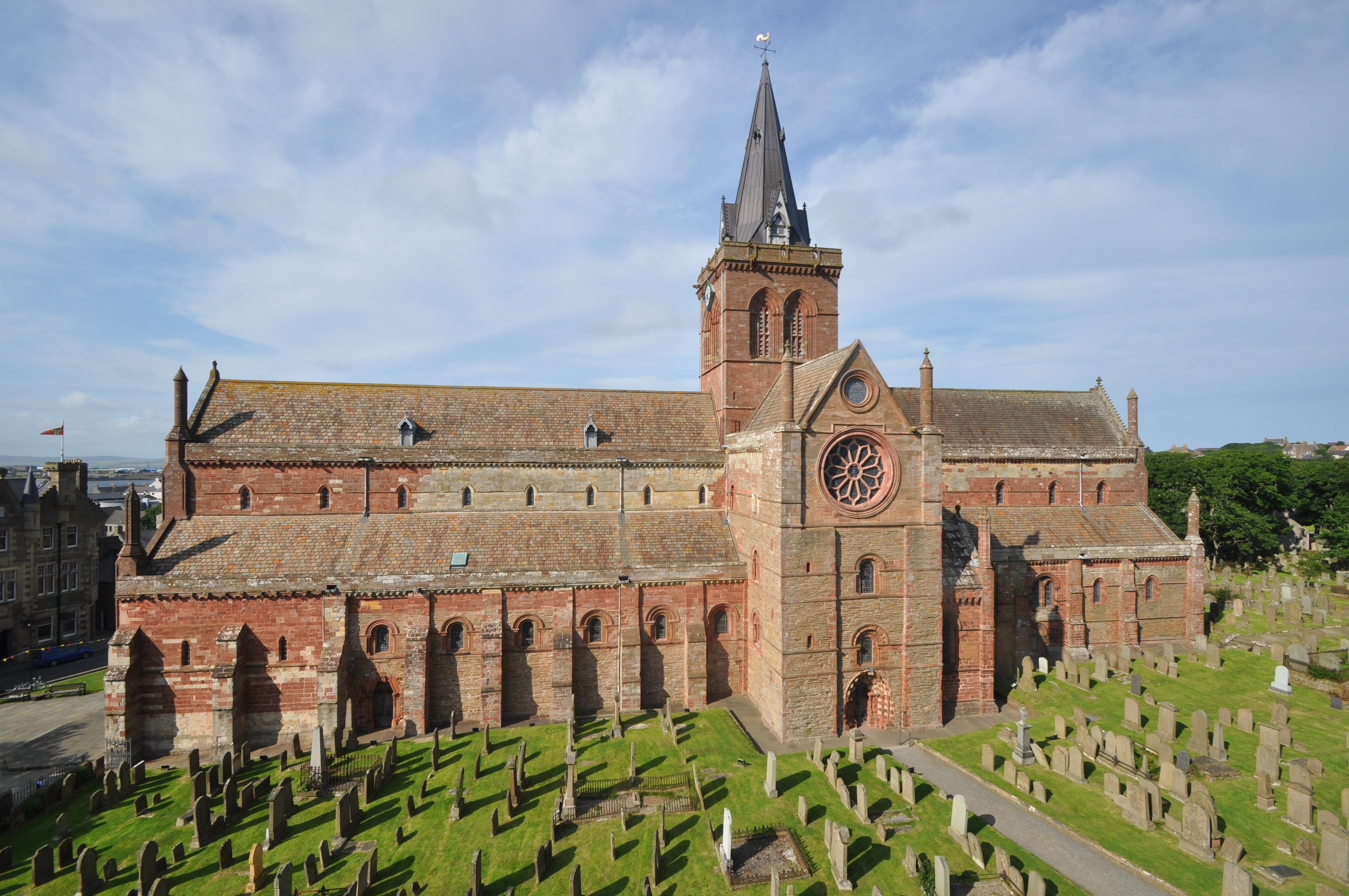

- 58°58′56″N 2°57′32″W
- Location: Kirkwall, Orkney
- Country: Scotland
- Denomination: Church of Scotland
- Previous denomination: Roman Catholic
- Website: www.stmagnus.org

History
- Founded: 1137
- Founder: Earl Rögnvald
- Dedication: Saint Magnus

Architecture
- Heritage designation: Category A listed

Specifications
- Height: 50 metres (160 ft)
- Materials: Sandstone

St Magnus Cathedral is a Church of Scotland parish church in Kirkwall, the main town of Orkney, a group of islands off the north coast of mainland Scotland. Originally a Roman Catholic cathedral, it is the oldest cathedral in Scotland and the most northerly cathedral in the United Kingdom. A large edifice that dominates the skyline of Kirkwall, it is a fine example of Romanesque architecture with later Gothic additions, built when the islands were ruled by the Norse Earls of Orkney as a semi-autonomous part of the Kingdom of Norway. The building is today owned by Orkney Islands Council as successor of the burgh of Kirkwall as a result of an act of King James III of Scotland following Orkney's annexation by the Scottish Crown in 1468.

Construction began in 1137 and it was added to over the next 300 years. The first bishop of Orkney was William the Old and it was for Bishop William that the nearby Bishop's Palace was built. Before the Scottish Reformation, the cathedral was presided over by the Bishop of Orkney. Today, it is a parish church of the Church of Scotland (with a presbyterian system of Church governance). As of 2024, the congregation of St Magnus Cathedral is part of Orkney Islands Church of Scotland – a single Church of Scotland ecclesiastical parish. The cathedral is listed at Category A, the highest grade of listed building in Scotland.

The cathedral has its own dungeon. People accused of witchcraft in Orkney from 1594–1708 were usually incarcerated in the cathedral, with their trials also held here.

== Foundation ==
The Orkneyinga saga tells how bloodthirsty intrigue and saintly piety led to the cathedral's foundation. Other accounts tell a similar, though slightly less saintly, tale.

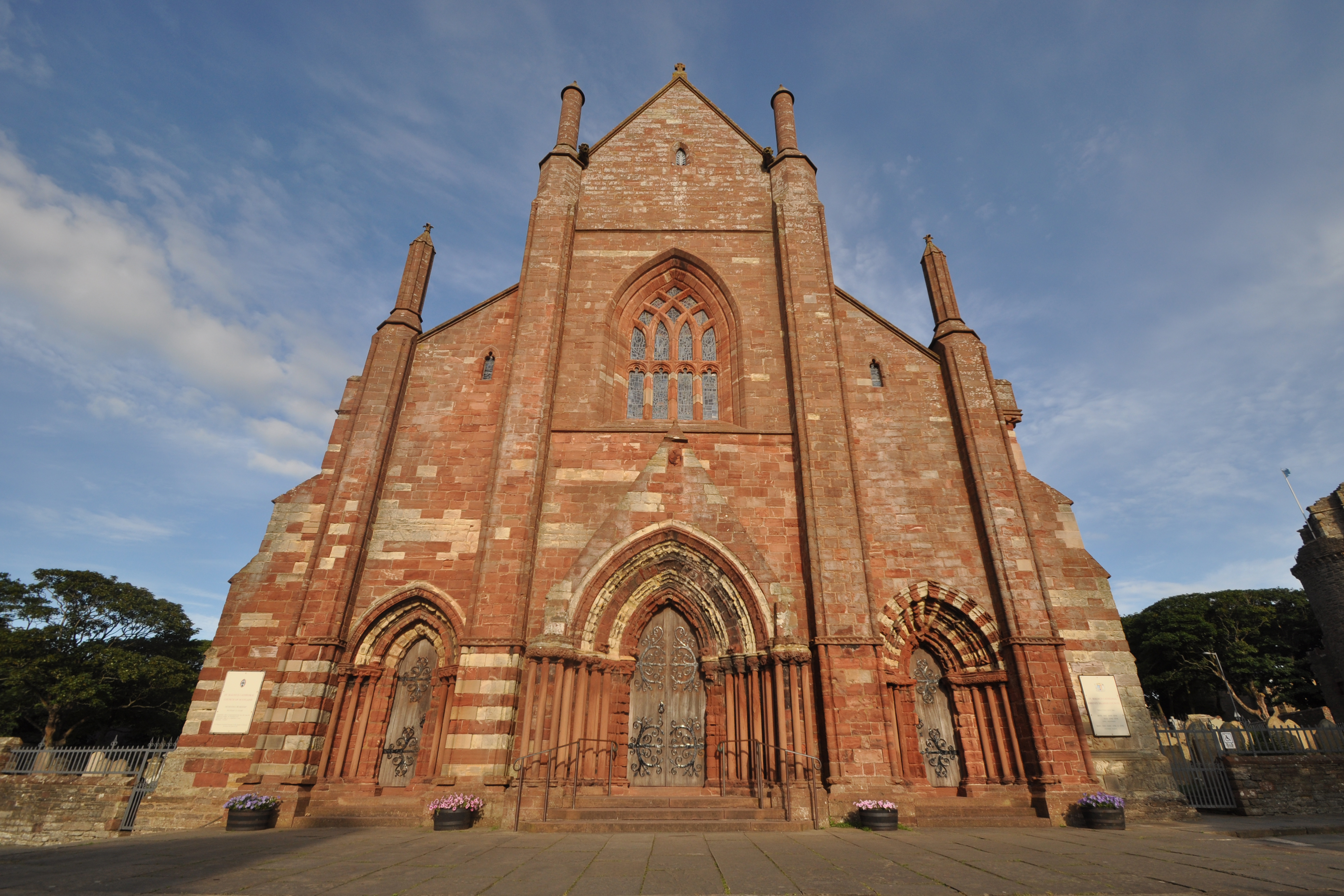
Main entrance

=== Martyrdom of St Magnus ===
St Magnus had a reputation for piety and gentleness. On a raid led by the King of Norway on Anglesey, Wales, Magnus refused to fight and stayed on board singing psalms. King Eystein II of Norway granted him a share of the earldom of Orkney held by his cousin Håkon, and they ruled amicably as joint earls of Orkney from 1105 to 1114. Their followers fell out, and the two sides met at a thing (assembly) on Mainland, Orkney, ready to do battle. Peace was negotiated and the Earls arranged to meet each other on the small island of Egilsay, each bringing only two ships. Magnus arrived on 16 April 1116 (or 1117) with his two ships, but then Håkon treacherously turned up with eight ships. Magnus was captured and offered to go into exile or prison, but an assembly of chieftains insisted that one earl must die. Håkon's standard bearer refused to execute Magnus and Håkon made his cook Lifolf kill Magnus by striking him on the head with an axe.

Magnus was buried in the 'Christchurch' at Birsay. The rocky area around his grave miraculously became a green field, and there were numerous reports of miraculous happenings and healings. William the Old, Bishop of Orkney, warned that it was "heresy to go about with such tales", then was struck blind in his Birsay cathedral and subsequently had his sight restored after praying at the grave of Magnus, not long after visiting Norway (and perhaps meeting Earl Rögnvald Kolsson).

=== Earl Rögnvald founds the cathedral ===
Gunhild, sister of Magnus, had married Kol, and the king of Norway granted their son Rögnvald Kali Kolsson the right to his uncle's earldom in 1129. Earl Rögnvald eventually took a fleet to Orkney, but the islanders resisted and Earl Paul who had succeeded Håkon would not give up control without a fight. Then, Earl Rögnvald Kolsson was advised by his father Kol to promise the islanders to "build a stone minster at Kirkwall more magnificent than any in Orkney, that you'll have [it] dedicated to your uncle the holy Earl Magnus and provide it with all the funds it will need to flourish. In addition, his holy relics and the episcopal seat must be moved there [from Birsay]". Meanwhile, Rögnvald had Paul kidnapped and shipped away, later to be murdered in Caithness. Rögnvald duly became Earl of Orkney.

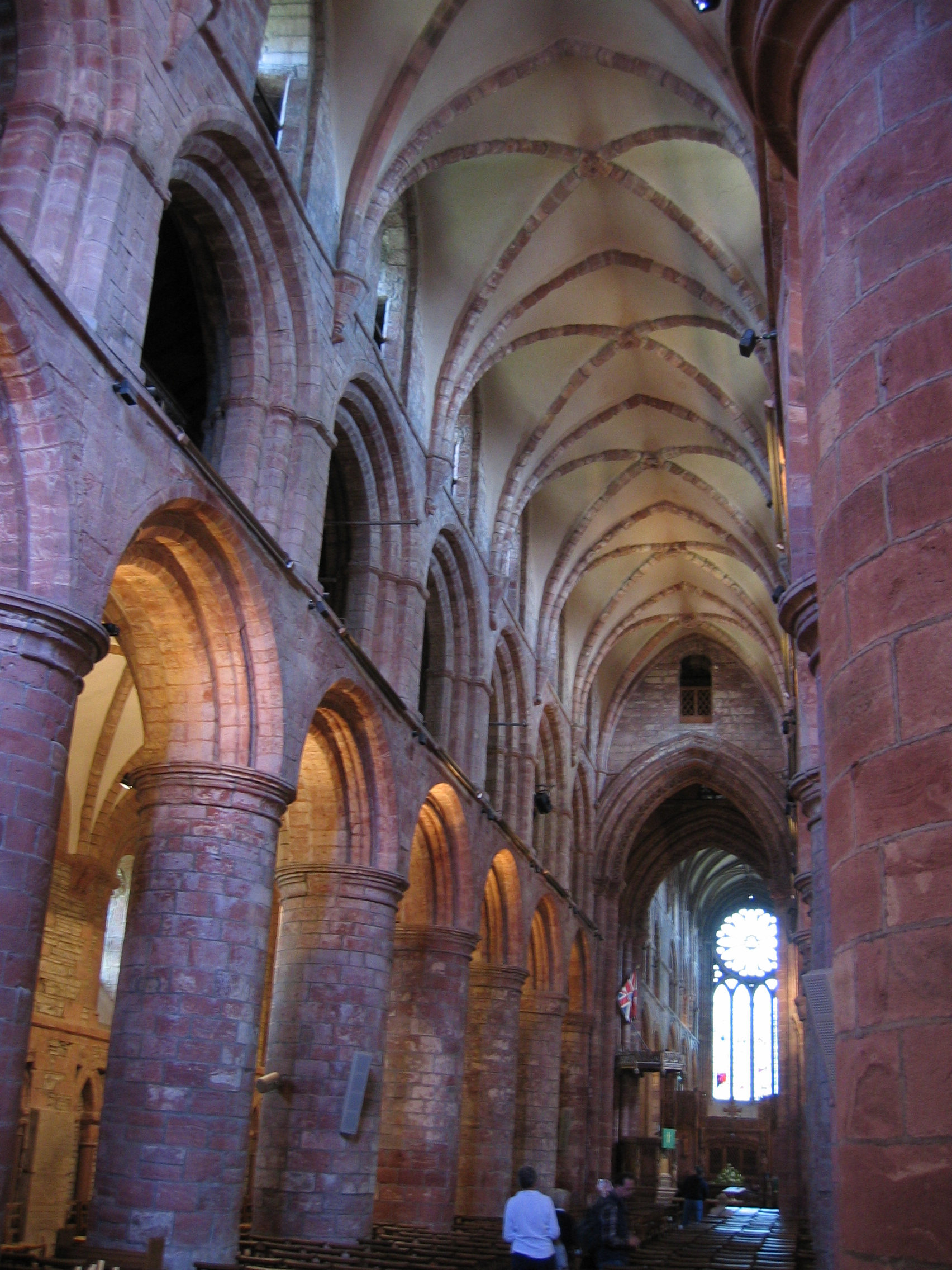
The interior of St Magnus Cathedral

In 1135, Magnus was canonised, with 16 April becoming St Magnus' day. His remains were translated east to St Olaf's Kirk in the small settlement known as Kirkjuvágr, meaning "church bay", now Kirkwall. (Note: Waugh (2003) states that Kirkwall is recorded in the Orkneyinga Saga as Kirkjuvágr meaning "church voe" or "inlet of the sea with a church situated at its inner end".)

Work on the cathedral began in 1137, under the direction of Kol. When funds ran short, Kol advised Rögnvald to restore odal rights for cash payment. In 1158, while work was still under way, Rögnvald was killed by a Scottish chieftain. His bones were brought to the cathedral and he was canonised in 1192, though the records of his sainthood are missing. Rögnvald's bones were found and re-interred during work on the building in the 19th century.

== Architecture and history ==
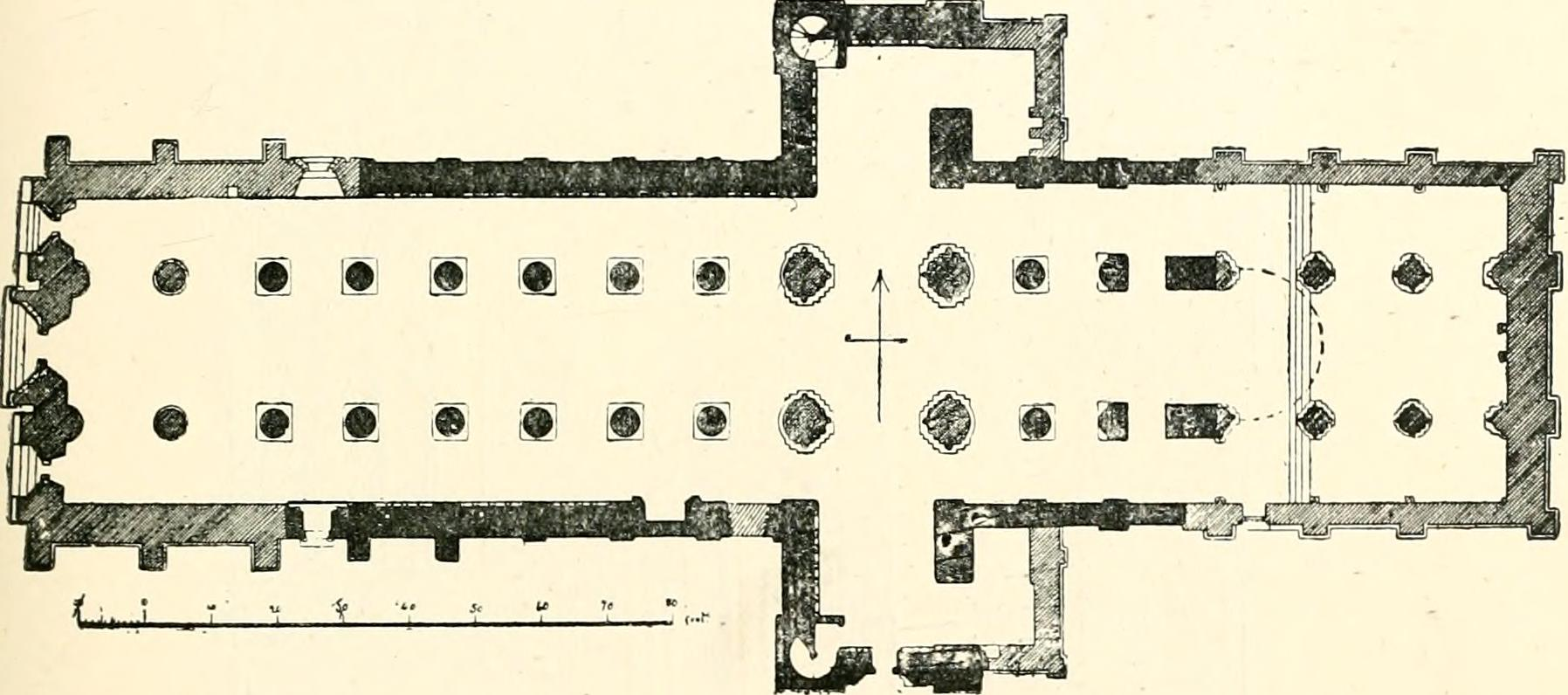
Floorplan

The Romanesque cathedral begun in 1137 has fine examples of Norman architecture, attributed to English masons who may have worked on Durham Cathedral. The masonry uses red sandstone quarried near Kirkwall and yellow sandstone from the island of Eday, often in alternating courses or in a chequerboard pattern to give a polychrome effect.

As completed during the 12th century, the original cathedral had three aisled bays to the chancel with the bay at the east end shorter, and apsed in a similar way to the original apse at Durham, a transept with single east chapel, and eight bays to the nave as at Durham and Dunfermline Abbey. When the cathedral was ready for consecration the relics of St Magnus were enshrined in it. In 1919, a hidden cavity in a column was found, containing a box with bones including a skull showing a wound consistent with a blow from an axe.

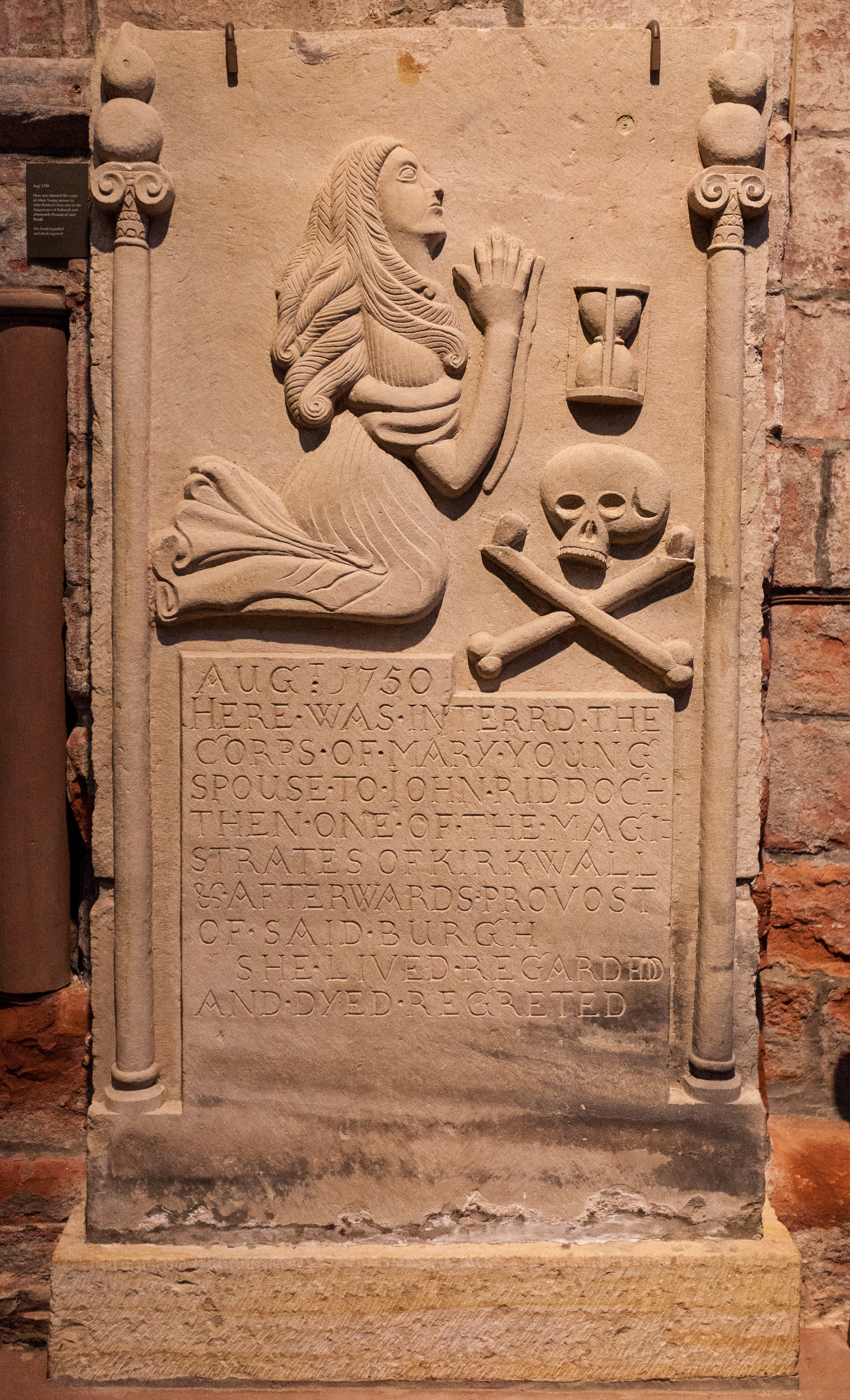
1750 monument to Mary Young, within the cathedral

In the late 12th and early 13th century, the building was extended to the east with vaulting throughout, and, in the late 14th century, the present lower front was joined to the rest of the building. These later elements introduced the Gothic style with pointed arches. The bishopric appears to have been suffragan of the Archbishop of York (with intermittent control exercised by the Archbishop of Hamburg-Bremen) until the creation of the Archbishopric of Trondheim (Niðaros) in 1152. In 1468, Orkney was annexed for Scotland by King James III, The see, however, remained under the nominal control of Trondheim until the creation of the Archbishopric of St Andrews in 1472. Bishops of Orkney were subsequently of Scots rather than Scandinavian origin.

Mary I of England sent a fleet to Scotland in 1557, commanded by William Woodhouse and John Clere. Clere burnt the town on 11 August and on the next day he entered the cathedral and brought six cannon on shore to batter the castle. On 13 August the force attempting to take the Bishop's Palace was beaten back to sea by 3000 islanders, and 97 men including Clere were drowned.

The Protestant Reformation in 1560 had a less dramatic effect on St Magnus Cathedral than in some other parts of Scotland, but the church had a narrow escape in 1614. Government forces suppressing the rebellion of Robert, the son of Patrick Stewart, 2nd Earl of Orkney, had besieged and destroyed Kirkwall Castle and intended to destroy St Magnus Cathedral after rebels had hidden inside. The bishop James Law intervened to prevent them from carrying out this plan.

Major work was undertaken on the cathedral in 1908 by the architect George Mackie Watson: this included replacing the dumpy slated pyramid atop the tower with a taller spire clothed in copper sheeting. As a result, the cathedral looks much more as it did until its original spire was struck by lightning in the late 17th century. Restoration and renovation work on the building continues, with increased urgency since it was discovered in the 1970s that the west end of the cathedral was in danger of collapsing away from the remainder of the structure. Other work has progressed further, and to celebrate its 850th anniversary in 1987 Queen Elizabeth II unveiled a magnificent new west window. St Magnus is the only wholly mediaeval Scottish cathedral, and one of the best-preserved buildings of the era in Britain.

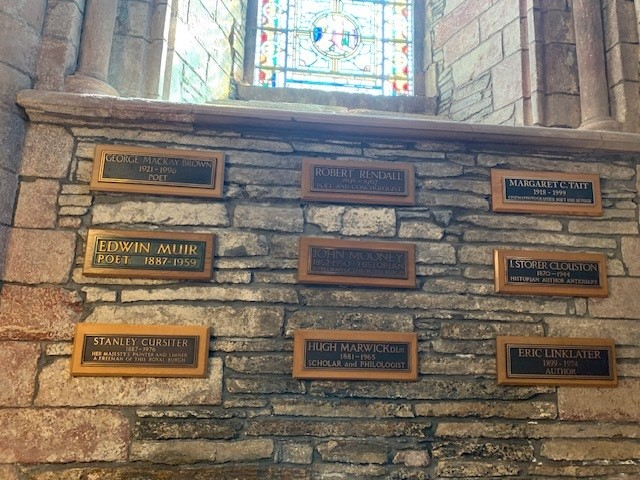
Memorial plaques for George Mackay Brown, Edwin Muir, John Mooney, Eric Linklater, Margaret Tait, J. Storer Clouston, Hugh Marwick, Robert Rendall, Stanley Cursiter in St Magnus Cathedral, Orkney

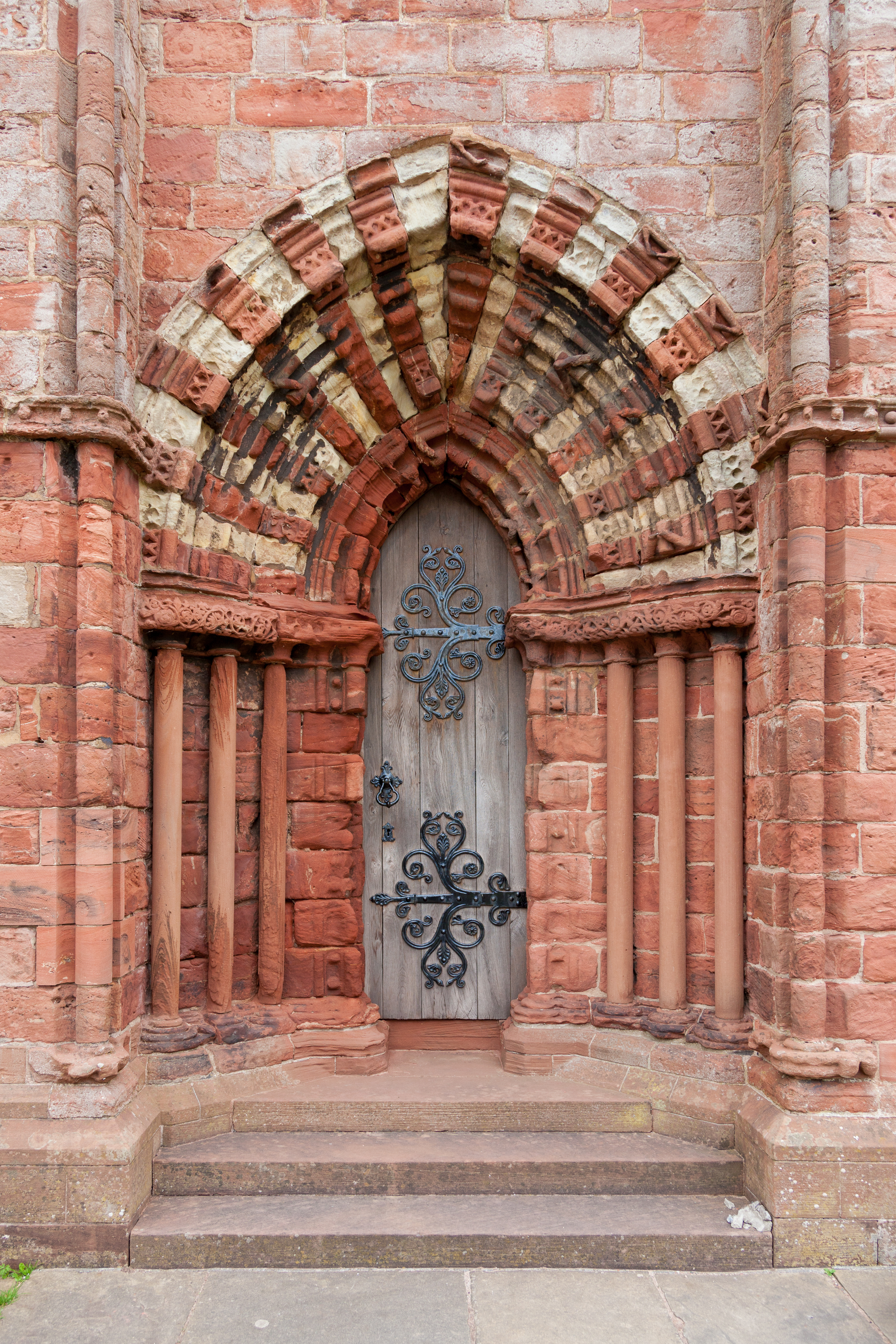
Doorway detail

The cathedral contains memorials to prominent Orcadians including explorers William Balfour Baikie and Dr John Rae, writers Eric Linklater, George Mackay Brown and Edwin Muir, film-maker Margaret Tait, artist Stanley Cursiter and psychiatrist Sir Thomas Clouston.

=== Witchcraft trials ===
People accused of witchcraft in Orkney from 1594–1708 were usually incarcerated in St Magnus Cathedral with trials also held in the church. One of the first people tried and executed for the crime of witchcraft in Orkney was Allison Balfour in 1594. Balfour was accused of having been hired by Patrick Stewart, 2nd Earl of Orkney, to poison his brother. While Patrick Stewart was acquitted in this instance, Balfour was executed.

The dungeon located between the choir and the south transept, also known as Marwick's Hole, was used as a prison until as late as the 18th century and those accused of witchcraft would have been held here before their trial and execution. The opening to the cell that is visible was originally a window. It is called a bottle dungeon because of the way the floor arches upward, like the inside of a champagne bottle.

=== Bishop's Palace ===
At the same time as the original cathedral was being constructed, the Bishop's Palace was built nearby for William the Old, with a large rectangular hall above vaulted store rooms.

King Haakon IV of Norway, overwintering after his defeat at the Battle of Largs, died here in December 1263, marking the end of Norse rule over the Outer Hebrides. The King was buried in St Magnus Cathedral until the weather was good enough to return his remains to Bergen.

The palace fell into ruins, then after 1540 was restored by Bishop Robert Reid who added a round tower, the "Moosie Toor". He presided at St Magnus from 1541 to 1558, and his bequest of 8,000 merks to found a college in Edinburgh led to the creation of the University of Edinburgh in 1583. The ruins of the Bishop's Palace are open to the public (see Historic Scotland). Opposite the Bishop's Palace, the ruins of the Earl's Palace give a reminder of the reign of the Stewart Earls of Orkney during the late 16th and early 17th centuries; they too are open to the public.

=== Bells ===
There are four bells in St Magnus, donated in 1528 by Bishop Robert Maxwell. The smallest bell bears no inscription or date and was not hung. According to the antiquary Sir Henry Edward Leigh Dryden, fourth and seventh Dryden baronet (1818–1899), "They are not and probably never have been rung by the common processes of wheel or crank but by a rope applied so as by a lateral traction to make the tongue strike the side. One end of a short rope is fastened to the tongue and the other to the wall; a second rope is fastened to the middle of the first and the lower end of it pulled by the ringer, which of course pulls the tongue to one side. The notes produced by the bells are not at diatonic intervals, being about five quarter tones apart. They are about G ¼ tone sharp, A ½ tone sharp, С ¼ tone sharp. The second bell is used for the clock and is struck by the clock hammer on the outside, giving, when so struck, a note lower than that given when struck by the tongue."

The third bell is described as "tenor G ¼ tone sharp" and has a diameter of 41.5 inches (105 cm) and height of 33 inches (84 cm). Dryden notes that the third bell bears an inscription in plain capitals raised in two lines, rendered here in the original spelling: "Made by master Robbert Maxwell, Bischop of Orkney, the year of God MDXXVIII. the year of the reign of King James the V. Robert Borthwik made me in the castel of Edinburgh."

In 1671, when the tower of the church was struck by lightning and burned, the bells fell into the church. It is said that townspeople hurried soft material into the church to catch the bells, should they fall, but despite their efforts, the largest bell did suffer a rift.

Therefore, in July 1682, the church authorities contracted with Alexander Geddes, merchant in Kirkwall, to deliver the bell to Amsterdam, where it was recast by Claudius Fremy. On arrival in Amsterdam, the bell was weighed and was found to be 1,500 pounds (680 kg). It lost 65 pounds (29 kg) in casting, but 193 pounds (88 kg) pounds of "new metal" was added, resulting in a finished weight of 1,528 pounds (693 kg). The new tongue in the bell weighed 46 pounds (21 kg). Geddes returned the bell to Kirkwall on 23 August of the same year.

=== Clock ===
The original turret clock was built in 1761 by an Aberdeen clockmaker named Hugh Gordon. The clock was refurbished with an automatic mechanism by James Ritchie & Son in 2018.

=== Organ ===
The organ was installed in 1925 and built by Henry Willis. It has been maintained by the same firm ever since. A specification of the organ can be found on the National Pipe Organ Register.

== See also ==
- List of Church of Scotland parishes
- St Magnus Festival
- Witchcraft in Orkney
