= My Love's in Germany =

Poem by Scottish poet Hector Macneill

"My Love’s in Germany" (My Luve's in Germanie) is a poem written by Scottish poet Hector Macneill. It was first printed in 1794 and is the lament of a Scottish woman for her lover.

The song was re-published in 1885 by Colonel David Balfour as an Orkney melody composed by Colonel Thomas Traill around 1630. Traill (from Holland Farm, that is "the farm on the high land", in Papa Westray), was a soldier in the army of Gustavus Adolphus, also known as Germany Thomas, during the Thirty Years' War.

The tune was later used by Robert Burns for his song "Ye Jacobites by Name".

My Luve's in Germanie

Silly Wizard sang "My Love’s in Germany" in 1976 on their eponymous debut album on the Transatlantic/XTRA label, Silly Wizard. This track was also included in 2004 on the anthology Transatlantic Folk Box Set.

Welsh folk band The Trials of Cato covered the song in 2018 on their debut album Hide and Hair.

German folk-rock band dArtagnan covered the song in 2022, together with Zora Cock from Blackbriar.
