= William Glen (poet) =

Scottish poet

William Glen (14 November 1789 – December 1826), Scottish poet, born in Glasgow, was for some years in the West Indies. He died in poverty. He wrote several poems, but the only one which has survived is his Jacobite ballad, Wae's me for Prince Charlie.
