= Ye Jacobites by Name =

Traditional Scottish folk song

"Ye Jacobites by Name" (Roud # 5517) is a traditional Scottish folk song which goes back to the Jacobite risings in Scotland (1688–1746). While the original version simply attacked the Jacobites from a contemporaneous Whig point of view, Robert Burns rewrote it in around 1791 to give a version with a more general, humanist anti-war, but nonetheless anti-Jacobite outlook. This is the version that most people know today and has been performed and recorded by Scottish folk groups such as The Corries and The McCalmans.

The song (no. 371) was published in 1793 in volume 4 of James Johnson's Scots Musical Museum and in James Hogg's Jacobite Reliques of 1817 (no. 34). It also appears in a collection of Scottish songs entitled Personal Choice by Ewan MacColl. The tune is taken from "My Love's in Germany" by Hector Macneill.

== Robert Burns's version ==
This is the version in Johnson's, Hogg's and MacColl's collections:

Ye Jacobites by name, give an ear, give an ear,
Ye Jacobites by name, give an ear,
Ye Jacobites by name,
Your fautes I will proclaim,
Your doctrines I maun blame, you shall hear, you shall hear
Your doctrines I maun blame, you shall hear.

What is Right, and What is Wrang, by the law, by the law?
What is Right and what is Wrang by the law?
What is Right, and what is Wrang?
A short sword, and a lang,
A weak arm and a strang, for to draw, for to draw
A weak arm and a strang, for to draw.

What makes heroic strife, famed afar, famed afar?
What makes heroic strife famed afar?
What makes heroic strife?
To whet th' assassin's knife,
Or hunt a Parent's life, wi' bluidy war, wi' bluidy war
Or hunt a Parent's life, wi' bluidy war?

Then let your schemes alone, in the state, in the state,
Then let your schemes alone in the state.
So let your schemes alone,
Adore the rising sun,
And leave a man undone, to his fate, to his fate.
And leave a man undone, to his fate.

== Original lyrics ==
You Jacobites by Name, now give Ear, now give Ear,
You Jacobites by Name, now give Ear;
You Jacobites by Name, your Praise I will proclaim,
Some says you are to blame for this Wear.

With the Pope you covenant, as they say, as they say,
With the Pope you covenant, as they say,
With the Pope you covenant, and Letters there you sent,
Which made your Prince present to array.

Your Prince and Duke o'Perth, where they go, where they go,
Your Prince and Duke o'Perth, where they go,
Your Prince and Duke o'Perth, they're Cumb'rers o' the Earth,
Causing great Hunger and Dearth where they go.

He is the King of Reef, I'll declare, I'll declare,
He is the King of Reef, I'll declare,
He is the King of Reef, of a Robber and o' Thief,
To rest void of Relief when he's near.

They marched thro' our Land cruelly, cruelly,
They marched thro' our Land cruelly,
They marched thro' our Land with a bloody thievish Band
To Edinburgh then they wan Treachery.

To Preston then they came, in a Rout, in a Rout,
To Preston then they came, in a Rout;
To Preston then they came, brave Gard'ner murd'red then.
A Traitor did command, as we doubt.

To England then they went, as bold, as bold,
To England then they went, as bold;
To England then they went, and Carlisle they ta'en't,
The Crown they fain would ha'en't, but behold.

To London as they went, on the Way, on the Way,
To London as they went, on the way,
To London as they went, in a Trap did there present,
No battle they will stent, for to die.

They turned from that Place, and they ran, and they ran,
They turned from that Place, and they ran;
They turned from that Place as the Fox, when Hounds do chace.
They tremble at the Name, CUMBERLAN'.

To Scotland then they came, when they fly, when they fly,
To Scotland then they came, when they fly,
To Scotland then they came, and they robb'd on every Hand,
By Jacobites Command, where they ly.

When Duke William does command, you must go, you must go;
When Duke William does command, you must go;
When Duke William does command, then you must leave the Land,
Your Conscience in your Hand like a Crow.

Tho' Carlisle ye took by the Way, by the Way;
Tho' Carlisle ye took by the Way;
Tho' Carlisle ye took, short Space ye did it Brook,
These Rebels got a Rope on a Day.

The Pope and Prelacy, where they came, where they came,
The Pope and Prelacy, where they came;
The Pope and Prelacy, they rul'd with Cruelty,
They ought to hing on high for the same.
