= Polly Bolton =

Polly Bolton was the stage name of the actress Mary Catherine Bolton (1790/91–1830)

It is also the name of two British folk singers:

- one known for playing with Dando Shaft
- one playing with The Trials of Cato
