= Gog Magog (album) =

Studio album by the Trials of Cato
- Released: 25 November 2022
- Recorded: Kerhonkson, USA
- Genre: Folk
- Length: 48:21
- Label: Fanatic Records

The Trials of Cato chronology
Hide and Hair (2018)	Gog Magog (2022)

Gog Magog is the second album by British folk band the Trials of Cato, released on 25 November 2022. It is named after the giant of Arthurian legend, and the Cambridgeshire hilltop, near to which much of the music was written, during the COVID-19 pandemic. The album has received widespread praise and positive reviews.

== Reviews ==
Folk/Tumble, 2022. "exciting and magical"

Folk Radio, 2022. "packed with genre-defying music that will surely be greeted with as much enthusiasm and praise as their debut"

Bright Young Folk, 2022. "Gog Magog confirms that the fame The Trials of Cato have gained in such a short amount of time is not only well-deserved, but likely to grow."

For Folk's Sake, 2022. "The Trials of Cato have proven themselves equal to the task of matching and surpassing Hide and Hair. The real mystery of Gog Magog is how they continue to create such inspired and inspiring music."

== Track listing ==
1. "Paper Planes"
2. "Gog Magog"
3. "Ring of Roses"
4. "Aberdaron"
5. "Kerhonkson Stomp"
6. "When Black Shuck Roams"
7. "Boudicca C. Ad 60"
8. "Dawns"
9. "I Thought You Were My Friend"
10. "Bedlam Boys"
11. "Balls to the Wall"
12. "As Green as You"

"Ring of Roses" was released as a single on 18 November 2022.

== Personnel ==
The Trials of Cato

- Polly Bolton – mandolin, Irish bouzouki, clawhammer banjo, vocals
- Robin Jones – mandolin, tenor banjo, vocals
- Tomos Williams – guitar, bass, keys, vocals

== Subject matter ==
"Ring of Roses" is based on the popular nursery rhyme Ring a Ring o' Roses, whose meaning is unknown; Yet is often conjectured to refer to the Great Plague. The song, written during the lockdowns of the COVID-19 pandemic, is a nod to this theory.

"Aberdaron" is an adaptation of the Welsh poem by Albert Evans-Jones, in which the writer expresses their desire to retire to the town of Aberdaron in north Wales.

"Kerhonkson Stomp" is a set named for the town of Kerhonkson in New York, USA, where the album was recorded.

"When Black Shuck Roams" refers to the Black Shuck, a ghostly black dog of East Anglian folklore, of whom it is said that to meet is to be warned that your death will occur before the end of the year.

"Boudicca C. Ad 60" is an ode to Queen Boudicca of the Iceni tribe, who led an unsuccessful revolt against Roman rule of England in the year 60 AD.

"Bedlam Boys" is based on the poem by Thomas d'Urfey, published in 1720, called Mad Maudlin's Search.
