= List of listed buildings in Holm, Orkney =

This is a list of listed buildings in the parish of Holm in Orkney, Scotland.

== List ==
Name	Location	Date Listed	Grid Ref. (Note: Sometimes known as OSGB36, the grid reference (where provided) is based on the British national grid reference system used by the Ordnance Survey. • "Guide to National Grid". Ordnance Survey. • "Get-a-map". Ordnance Survey.)	Geo-coordinates	Notes	LB Number (Note: Historic Environment Scotland assign a unique alphanumeric identifier to each designated site in Scotland, for listed buildings this always begins with "LB", for example "LB12345".)	Image
Howa, Including Kiln				58°54′45″N 2°56′25″W	Category C(S)	46381	Upload Photo
St Mary's Village, The Pier				58°53′45″N 2°54′42″W	Category B	46389	Upload Photo
St Nicholas's Church, Former Holm Kirk, Including Walled Churchyard, Gatepiers And Outbuilding				58°53′25″N 2°51′04″W	Category B	12724	Upload Photo
Greenwall House, Including Outbuildings And Boundary Walls				58°53′48″N 2°50′38″W	Category B	12725	Upload Photo
St Mary's Village, The Corn Store				58°53′46″N 2°54′32″W	Category B	12727	Upload Photo
Lamb Holm, The Italian Chapel, (Roman Catholic), Including Statue				58°53′24″N 2°53′22″W	Category A	12728	Upload another image
Eastbanks, Including Outbuilding				58°53′08″N 2°50′20″W	Category C(S)	46379	Upload Photo
Graemeshall, Including Boundary Walls, Gatepiers And Walled Garden				58°53′58″N 2°53′27″W	Category B	12726	Upload Photo
Netherbutton, Including Boundary Walls, Gatepiers And Outbuilding				58°55′25″N 2°56′27″W	Category C(S)	46383	Upload Photo
Smithy Cottage, Including Former Smithy And Boundary Walls				58°54′36″N 2°54′31″W	Category C(S)	46385	Upload Photo
Hestakelday				58°54′10″N 2°52′39″W	Category B	46380	Upload Photo
Pentland View, Former U P Church Manse, Including Walled Garden And Outbuilding				58°54′03″N 2°51′45″W	Category B	46384	Upload Photo
St Mary's Village, Elrose, Including Boundary Walls				58°53′45″N 2°55′05″W	Category C(S)	46390	Upload Photo
Little Millhouse				58°54′26″N 2°53′14″W	Category C(S)	46382	Upload Photo
St Mary's Village, Former Temperance Hall				58°53′48″N 2°54′48″W	Category C(S)	46388	Upload Photo

== Key ==
The scheme for classifying buildings in Scotland is:

- Category A: "buildings of national or international importance, either architectural or historic; or fine, little-altered examples of some particular period, style or building type."
- Category B: "buildings of regional or more than local importance; or major examples of some particular period, style or building type, which may have been altered."
- Category C: "buildings of local importance; lesser examples of any period, style, or building type, as originally constructed or moderately altered; and simple traditional buildings which group well with other listed buildings."

In March 2016 there were 47,288 listed buildings in Scotland. Of these, 8% were Category A, and 50% were Category B, with the remaining 42% being Category C.

== See also ==
- List of listed buildings in Orkney
