= From Scourging Rebellion =

British song

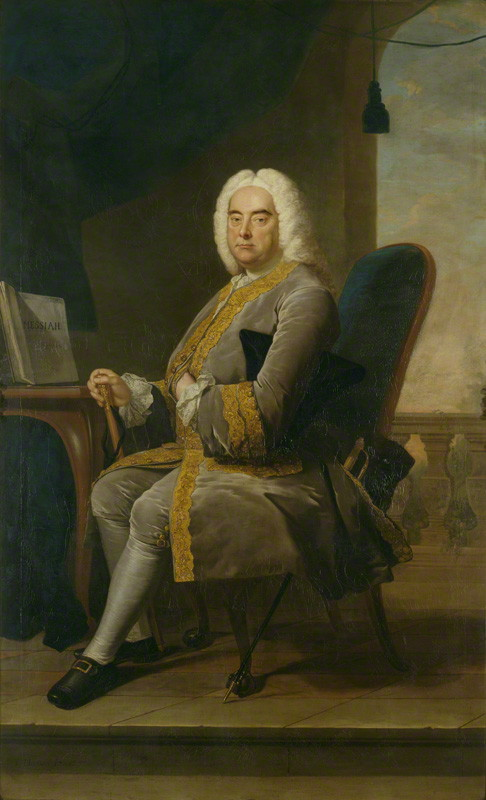
Portrait of George Frideric Handel by Thomas Hudson

From Scourging Rebellion (also called Your glasses charge high, 'tis in brave William's praise) is a 1746 song composed by the German-born British George Frideric Handel. It was composed in the wake of the Jacobite Rebellion of 1745 to celebrate Prince William, Duke of Cumberland, the younger son of the Hanoverian king George II of Great Britain. Cumberland, recalled from command of the Pragmatic Army in the Low Countries, oversaw the decisive victory over the Jacobites at the Battle of Culloden on 16 April 1746. It was sung at Vauxhall Gardens on 15 May 1746.

== Lyrics ==
The lyrics for From Scourging Rebellion are present in Jacobite Relics where it is titled Your glasses charge high, 'tis in brave William's praise and is set to the tune of Lillibullero instead of the tune created by Handel. The lyrics present in that book are as follows:

From scourging rebellion, and baffling proud France,
Crowned with laurels, behold British William advance!
His triumph to grace, and distinguish the day,
The sun brighter shines, and all nature looks gay.

Chorus:
Your glasses charge high, 'tis in brave William's praise,
In praise, in praise, 'tis in brave William's praise;
To his glory your voices, to his glory your voices,
To his glory your voices and instruments raise.

Whilst in pleasure's soft arms others courted repose,
Our hero flew forth though the streams round him froze;
To shield us from rebels all dangers defied,
And would conquer or die by famed liberty's side.

(Chorus)

In his train see sweet peace, fairest child of the sky,
Every bliss in her smile, every charm in her eye;
Whilst the worst foe to man, that dire fiend civil war,
Gnashing horrid her teeth, comes fast bound to her car.

(Chorus)

How hateful's the tyrant, who, lured by false fame,
To satiate his pride, sets the world in a flame!
How glorious our king, whose beneficent mind
Makes true grandeur consist in protecting mankind!

(Chorus)

Ye warriors, on whom we due honours bestow,
O think on the source whence our late evils flow'd,
Commanded by William, strike next at the Gaul,
And fix those in chains who would Britons enthral.

(Chorus)

== See also ==
- Stand Round my Brave Boys, a 1745 song by Handel
- Judas Maccabaeus (Handel), a 1746 oratorio by Handel

== Bibliography ==
- Burrows, Donald. Handel. Oxford University Press, 2012.
- Harris, James. Music and Theatre in Handel's World: The Family Papers of James Harris, 1732-1780. Oxford University Press, 2002.
- Hogwood, Christopher. Handel. Thames & Hudson, 2007.
- Smither, Howard E. A History of the Oratorio: Vol. 2: the Oratorio in the Baroque Era: Protestant Germany and England. UNC Press Books, 2012.
