= List of listed buildings in Walls And Flotta, Orkney =

This is a list of listed buildings in the parish of Walls And Flotta in Orkney, Scotland.

== List ==
Name	Location	Date Listed	Grid Ref. (Note: Sometimes known as OSGB36, the grid reference (where provided) is based on the British national grid reference system used by the Ordnance Survey. • "Guide to National Grid". Ordnance Survey. • "Get-a-map". Ordnance Survey.)	Geo-coordinates	Notes	LB Number (Note: Historic Environment Scotland assign a unique alphanumeric identifier to each designated site in Scotland, for listed buildings this always begins with "LB", for example "LB12345".)	Image
Walls, (Hoy), Melsetter House Including Garden Walls And Former Kennels				58°47′08″N 3°15′48″W	Category A	18712	Upload Photo
Flotta (Hoy), Whome Kiln And Barn				58°49′39″N 3°06′30″W	Category C(S)	48333	Upload Photo
Walls (Hoy), Longhope Lifeboat Station				58°46′47″N 3°13′41″W	Category B	48347	Upload Photo
Walls (Hoy), Melsetter, Gardener's Cottage, Including Stone Setts And Garden Wall To North				58°47′09″N 3°15′52″W	Category B	48366	Upload Photo
Walls (Hoy), North Ness, Milestone				58°48′23″N 3°12′13″W	Category C(S)	48375	Upload Photo
South Walls (Hoy), Longhope, Church Of St Columba, (Longhope Parish Church, Church Of Scotland)				58°47′58″N 3°11′31″W	Category C(S)	18809	Upload Photo
Flotta (Hoy), Bow Old Farmhouse, Byre And Barn				58°49′24″N 3°05′51″W	Category C(S)	18814	Upload Photo
South Walls (Hoy), Kirbuster, Letter Box				58°48′04″N 3°09′36″W	Category C(S)	48336	Upload Photo
South Walls (Hoy), Longhope, Milestone To North East Of Morven				58°48′04″N 3°11′00″W	Category C(S)	48340	Upload Photo
South Walls, (Hoy), South Ness, War Memorial				58°47′59″N 3°12′24″W	Category C(S)	48345	Upload Photo
Walls (Hoy), The Garrison (Former Garrison Theatre)				58°48′45″N 3°12′02″W	Category C(S)	48346	Upload Photo
Walls (Hoy), Milestone To West Of Lyrawa Bay				58°52′19″N 3°14′12″W	Category C(S)	48358	Upload Photo
Walls (Hoy), Melsetter House, Lodge, Gates, Gatepiers And Field Boundary Walls And Gatepiers				58°47′10″N 3°15′50″W	Category C(S)	48363	Upload Photo
Walls (Hoy), Melsetter, The Laundry House, Including Walled Yard To North And Wall And Gatepiers To South East				58°47′08″N 3°15′53″W	Category B	48368	Upload Photo
Walls (Hoy), Milestone To East Of Pegal Hill				58°51′47″N 3°13′20″W	Category C(S)	48377	Upload Photo
South Walls (Hoy), Cantick Head Lighthouse Including Keepers' Cottages, Sheds, Perimeter Wall And Sundial				58°47′14″N 3°07′54″W	Category B	18710	Upload Photo
South Walls (Hoy), Crowtaing, Pigsty				58°47′51″N 3°08′25″W	Category C(S)	48334	Upload Photo
South Walls (Hoy), Glebelands (Former South Walls Manse), Including Walled Garden And Boundary Wall				58°47′41″N 3°12′03″W	Category C(S)	48337	Upload Photo
South Walls (Hoy), Milestone To South Of Kirbuster House				58°48′03″N 3°09′32″W	Category C(S)	48339	Upload Photo
South Walls (Hoy), Quoy				58°47′36″N 3°10′19″W	Category C(S)	48343	Upload Photo
Walls (Hoy), Lyness Pier				58°50′01″N 3°11′27″W	Category C(S)	48349	Upload Photo
Walls (Hoy), Lyness, Milesone To West Of Haybrake				58°49′57″N 3°12′25″W	Category C(S)	48355	Upload Photo
Walls (Hoy), Melsetter, The Estate Office, Including Boundary Wall And Adjacent Outhouse And Stone Flagged Yard And Gatepiers To West				58°47′07″N 3°15′56″W	Category B	48365	Upload Photo
Walls (Hoy), Melsetter, The Hall, Including Gatepiers To West				58°47′07″N 3°15′55″W	Category B	48367	Upload Photo
Walls (Hoy), Millhouse				58°50′30″N 3°12′41″W	Category C(S)	48371	Upload Photo
Walls (Hoy), Wee Fea Naval Communications And Operational Centre				58°49′54″N 3°13′29″W	Category B	48378	Upload Photo
Hoy, Lyness, Scapa Flow Visitor Centre, Former Steam Pumping Station And Oil Storage Tank				58°50′01″N 3°11′48″W	Category A	50533	Upload another image
Walls (Hoy), St John's Church (Church Of Scotland), Including Boundary Wall				58°48′21″N 3°13′02″W	Category C(S)	47969	Upload Photo
Walls (Hoy), Lyness Naval Cemetery Including Pavilions, War Memorial And Boundary Walls				58°50′00″N 3°12′37″W	Category C(S)	48348	Upload Photo
Walls (Hoy), Lyness, Haybrake, Granary				58°49′55″N 3°12′21″W	Category B	48354	Upload Photo
Melsetter Farm, Steading				58°47′03″N 3°16′05″W	Category C(S)	48361	Upload Photo
Walls (Hoy), Melsetter House, Kitchen Garden Including Tea-House And Doocot, Rookery Walls And Gatepiers				58°47′05″N 3°15′50″W	Category A	48362	Upload Photo
Walls (Hoy), Melsetter, Walled Garden (Formerly Rose Garden) To Nw Of Melsetter House, Including Cartshed To West				58°47′09″N 3°15′52″W	Category B	48370	Upload Photo
Walls (Hoy), Bridge To South East Of Pegal Hill				58°51′34″N 3°13′36″W	Category B	48376	Upload Photo
South Walls (Hoy), Snelsetter				58°46′55″N 3°10′31″W	Category B	44590	Upload Photo
South Walls (Hoy), South Ness, Ness House				58°48′00″N 3°12′23″W	Category B	19662	Upload Photo
Walls (Hoy), 1 North Ness (Formerly The Ship Inn)				58°48′19″N 3°12′13″W	Category C(S)	18811	Upload Photo
Walls (Hoy), Lyness, Former Metal Industry Shed				58°49′52″N 3°11′59″W	Category B	48356	Upload Photo
Walls (Hoy), Lyness, Romney Hut				58°50′06″N 3°11′49″W	Category C(S)	48357	Upload Photo
Walls (Hoy) Melsetter Farmhouse, Including Boundary Wall				58°47′04″N 3°16′02″W	Category C(S)	48360	Upload Photo
Walls (Hoy), Melsetter Hill Burial Enclosure				58°47′16″N 3°16′17″W	Category C(S)	48364	Upload Photo
Walls (Hoy), Melsetter, Spinning Cottage				58°47′08″N 3°15′51″W	Category B	48369	Upload Photo
Walls (Hoy), Rysa Lodge, Including Garden Wall To South And East And Outbuildings To South West				58°50′52″N 3°12′15″W	Category A	18714	Upload Photo
Flotta (Hoy), Flotta Church (Church Of Scotland), Including War Memorial To South And Boundary Wall				58°49′14″N 3°05′55″W	Category C(S)	18813	Upload another image
South Walls (Hoy), Longhope, The Old Custom House (Including Westburn), Including Boundary Wall				58°47′55″N 3°11′56″W	Category B	18709	Upload Photo
South Walls (Hoy), Milestone To North Of Gallow Tuag				58°47′20″N 3°12′12″W	Category C(S)	48335	Upload Photo
South Walls (Hoy), Lythes, Milestone				58°47′45″N 3°12′50″W	Category C(S)	48342	Upload Photo
South Walls (Hoy), Snelsetter Gatepier				58°47′11″N 3°09′01″W	Category C(S)	48344	Upload Photo
Walls (Hoy), Muckle Rysa Including Garden Wall				58°51′11″N 3°12′09″W	Category B	48373	Upload Photo
South Walls (Hoy), Osmondwall, Moodie Mausoleum And Graveyard				58°47′17″N 3°09′13″W	Category B	19905	Upload Photo
South Walls (Hoy), Hillside				58°48′07″N 3°08′52″W	Category C(S)	48338	Upload Photo
South Walls (Hoy), Longhope, Royal Hotel, Including Boundary Wall				58°47′58″N 3°12′28″W	Category C(S)	48341	Upload Photo
Walls (Hoy), Milestone To North Of Millhouse				58°50′36″N 3°12′41″W	Category C(S)	48372	Upload Photo
Walls (Hoy), Munitions Depot Sw Of Ore Farm				58°49′16″N 3°12′31″W	Category B	48374	Upload Photo
Walls (Hoy), Lyness, Decontamination Shed				58°50′03″N 3°12′30″W	Category C(S)	48353	Upload Photo
Walls (Hoy), Melsetter House, Chapel				58°47′08″N 3°15′50″W	Category A	48359	Upload Photo

== Key ==
The scheme for classifying buildings in Scotland is:

- Category A: "buildings of national or international importance, either architectural or historic; or fine, little-altered examples of some particular period, style or building type."
- Category B: "buildings of regional or more than local importance; or major examples of some particular period, style or building type, which may have been altered."
- Category C: "buildings of local importance; lesser examples of any period, style, or building type, as originally constructed or moderately altered; and simple traditional buildings which group well with other listed buildings."

In March 2016 there were 47,288 listed buildings in Scotland. Of these, 8% were Category A, and 50% were Category B, with the remaining 42% being Category C.

== See also ==
- List of listed buildings in Orkney
