= List of listed buildings in Rousay and Egilsay, Orkney =

This is a list of listed buildings in the parish of Rousay and Egilsay in Orkney, Scotland.

== List ==
Name	Location	Date Listed	Grid Ref. (Note: Sometimes known as OSGB36, the grid reference (where provided) is based on the British national grid reference system used by the Ordnance Survey. • "Guide to National Grid". Ordnance Survey. • "Get-a-map". Ordnance Survey.)	Geo-coordinates	Notes	LB Number (Note: Historic Environment Scotland assign a unique alphanumeric identifier to each designated site in Scotland, for listed buildings this always begins with "LB", for example "LB12345".)	Image
Trumland House				59°07′58″N 3°00′00″W	Category B	18641	Upload Photo
Rousay, Viera Lodge Including Outbuildings, Boathouse, Gatepiers And Boundary Walls				59°08′06″N 3°03′51″W	Category B	42648	Upload Photo
Egilsay, Howan House, Including Remains Of Service Court				59°08′48″N 2°54′52″W	Category B	19664	Upload Photo
St. Magnus' Church (Old Egilsay Kirk)				59°09′25″N 2°56′07″W	Category A	18643	Upload another image
Westness House Inner Westness				59°08′33″N 3°04′47″W	Category B	18640	Upload Photo
Cubbie Roo's Castle				59°07′11″N 2°58′36″W	Category B	19898	Upload another image
Eynhallow Monastery				59°08′29″N 3°07′19″W	Category B	18645	Upload another image
Old Wyre Kirk (St. Peter's)				59°07′11″N 2°58′29″W	Category B	18644	Upload Photo
Rousay Meal Mill Sourin				59°09′48″N 2°58′49″W	Category B	18642	Upload Photo

== Key ==
The scheme for classifying buildings in Scotland is:

- Category A: "buildings of national or international importance, either architectural or historic; or fine, little-altered examples of some particular period, style or building type."
- Category B: "buildings of regional or more than local importance; or major examples of some particular period, style or building type, which may have been altered."
- Category C: "buildings of local importance; lesser examples of any period, style, or building type, as originally constructed or moderately altered; and simple traditional buildings which group well with other listed buildings."

In March 2016 there were 47,288 listed buildings in Scotland. Of these, 8% were Category A, and 50% were Category B, with the remaining 42% being Category C.

== See also ==
- List of listed buildings in Orkney
