= Such a Parcel of Rogues in a Nation =

Scottish folk song

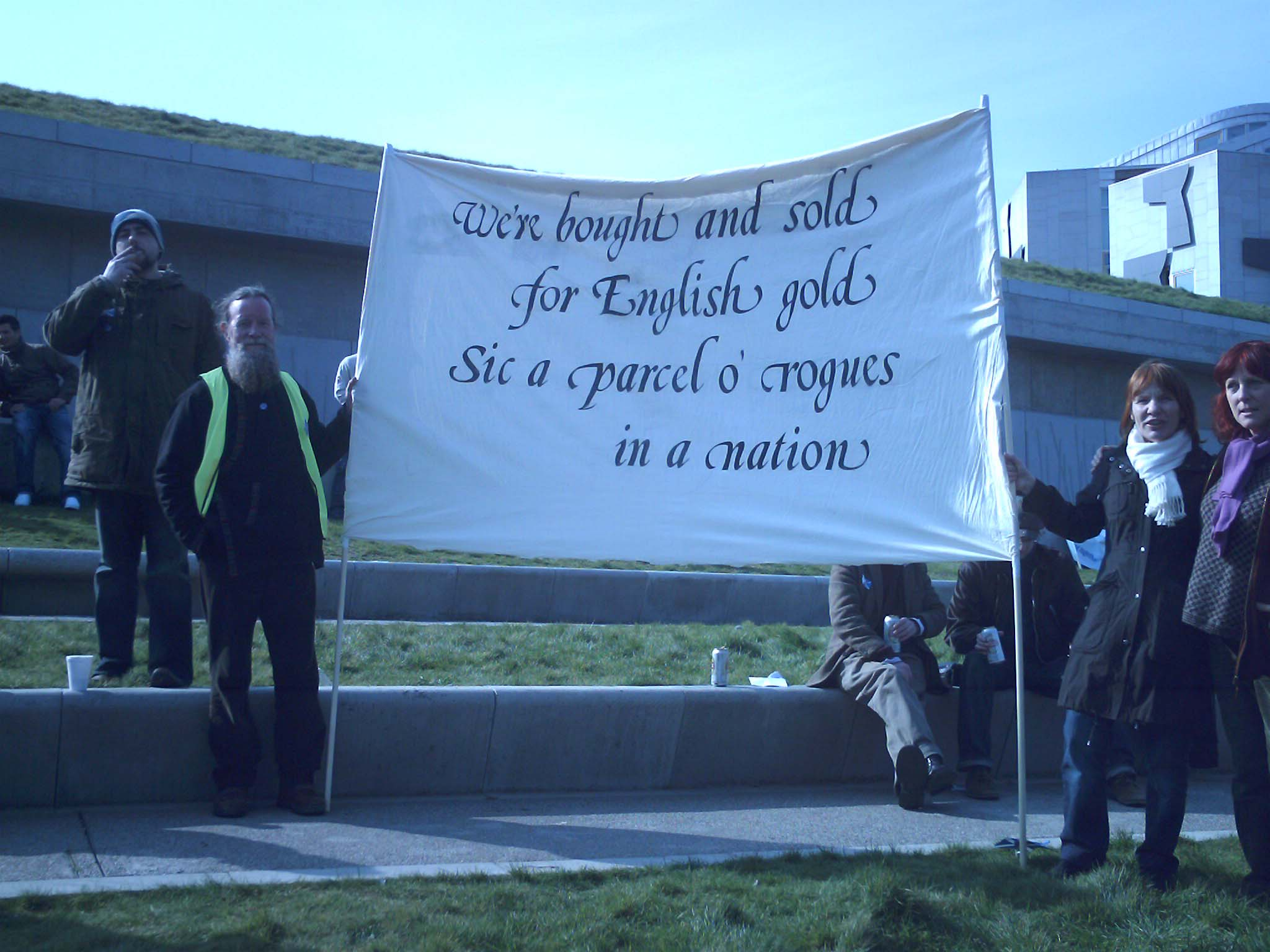
Lines from the lyrics on a banner at a protest at the Scottish Parliament

"Such a Parcel of Rogues in a Nation" is a Scottish folk song, listed as number 5516 in the Roud Folk Song Index.

The tune was published in 1747 in James Oswald's Caledonian Pocket Companion under the title "A parcel of Rogues in the Nation", and in William McGibbon's 1762 collection. Words and music were included in volume 4 of James Johnson's Scots Musical Museum, published in 1792. Though it credited Robert Burns for other contributions to the collection, he made no claim to this song. By 1853 the lyrics were attributed to him.

James Hogg's Jacobite Relics of 1819 related the song to airs and legends about Jacobitism, dating from furious arguments over blame for the ruinous failure of the Scottish Parliament's Darien scheme, when William and Mary ruled Scotland and England, to the Acts of Union which formed the unified Parliament of Great Britain in 1707. It came to be associated with Scottish nationalism and also been referenced in other situations where politicians' actions have gone against popular opinion.

== Background ==
Like other European countries during the crisis of the late Middle Ages, Scotland suffered civil wars, and conflict between kingdoms with intermittent wars of Scottish Independence against England. William Wallace and Robert the Bruce were prominent in campaigns, against Edward I and Edward II of England.

Royal marriage was a part of diplomacy, and in 1502 James IV of Scotland agreed a Treaty of Perpetual Peace before his marriage to Margaret, eldest daughter of Henry VII of England, which the poet William Dunbar celebrated in The Thrissil and the Rois. This brought the Stuarts into England's Tudor line of succession. In 1513 Henry VIII of England declared war on France. Under the Auld Alliance, James invaded England, and died at the Battle of Flodden.

Protestant Reformations in England and Scotland were resisted by Catholic minorities. There were further Anglo-Scottish Wars, but when succession to Elizabeth I ended, James VI of Scotland became king of England in the Union of the Crowns.

== History of the lyrics ==
"Such a Parcel of Rogues in a Nation" decries those members of the Parliament of Scotland who signed the Act of Union with England in 1707, presenting Jacobite allegations of treachery in contrast with martial valour and resistance attributed to Robert the Bruce and William Wallace.

The melody and lyrics were published in volume 1 of James Hogg's Jacobite Reliques of 1819 (no. 36).

== Recordings ==
The song was revived in the 20th century by Ewan MacColl, whose recording of it can be found on the collection The Real MacColl. Steeleye Span later included it under the name "Rogues in a Nation" on their album, Parcel of Rogues, and it has been covered by numerous other musicians, including The Corries, Alastair McDonald, Jean Redpath, The Dubliners (Luke Kelly), Dick Gaughan, Makem and Clancy, Hamish Imlach, Old Blind Dogs, The Delgados.

A spoken word version was recorded by Bill Drummond of The KLF as the closer of his solo album, The Man (1986).

== Lyrics ==
The song's lyrics, in Lowlands Scots, as published in volume 1 of James Hogg's Jacobite Reliques of 1819 (no. 36).

Fareweel to a' our Scottish fame,
Fareweel our ancient glory;
Fareweel ev'n to the Scottish name,
Sae fam'd in martial story.
Now Sark rins over Solway sands,
An' Tweed rins to the ocean,
To mark where England's province stands-
Such a parcel of rogues in a nation!

What force or guile could not subdue,
Thro' many warlike ages,
Is wrought now by a coward few,
For hireling traitor's wages.
The English steel we could disdain,
Secure in valour's station;
But English gold has been our bane -
Such a parcel of rogues in a nation!

O would, ere I had seen the day
That Treason thus could sell us,
My auld grey head had lien in clay,
Wi' Bruce and loyal Wallace!
But pith and power, till my last hour,
I'll mak this declaration;
We're bought and sold for English gold-
Such a parcel of rogues in a nation!
