= List of listed buildings in Westray, Orkney =

This is a list of listed buildings in the parish of Westray in Orkney, Scotland.

== List ==
Name	Location	Date Listed	Grid Ref. (Note: Sometimes known as OSGB36, the grid reference (where provided) is based on the British national grid reference system used by the Ordnance Survey. • "Guide to National Grid". Ordnance Survey. • "Get-a-map". Ordnance Survey.)	Geo-coordinates	Notes	LB Number (Note: Historic Environment Scotland assign a unique alphanumeric identifier to each designated site in Scotland, for listed buildings this always begins with "LB", for example "LB12345".)	Image
Heather View				59°18′59″N 2°59′47″W	Category C(S)	19910	Upload Photo
Cleat Farm Including Doocot				59°18′16″N 2°56′31″W	Category B	18730	Upload Photo
Noup Head Lighthouse Including Perimeter Wall, Gatepiers And Sundial Base				59°19′52″N 3°04′13″W	Category B	18736	Upload another image
Brough Farmhouse				59°18′35″N 2°58′09″W	Category B	18804	Upload Photo
Pierowall, Westray Baptist Church, including Boundary Wall				59°19′10″N 2°59′35″W	Category C(S)	18806	Upload Photo
Brough Farm, Steading				59°18′37″N 2°58′11″W	Category C(S)	47993	Upload Photo
Pierowall Harbour, Gill Pier				59°19′25″N 2°58′27″W	Category C(S)	48001	Upload Photo
Langskaill Old Manse				59°16′01″N 2°59′17″W	Category B	18732	Upload Photo
Westray Parish Church (Church Of Scotland) Including Boundary Walls And Ancillary Structure				59°17′54″N 2°57′20″W	Category C(S)	46706	Upload Photo
Langskaill Farm				59°16′06″N 2°59′10″W	Category C(S)	47996	Upload Photo
Cleat Including Gatepiers And Wall				59°18′14″N 2°56′32″W	Category B	18729	Upload Photo
Noltland Castle				59°19′15″N 3°00′15″W	Category A	18735	Upload another image
Braehead, Blinkbonny House Including Outbuilding				59°18′30″N 2°58′38″W	Category C(S)	47991	Upload Photo
To North Of Helzie, Windmill Stump				59°14′58″N 2°51′58″W	Category C(S)	47995	Upload Photo
Sangar				59°15′32″N 2°51′51″W	Category B	48010	Upload Photo
Pierowall, Lady Kirk, Including Boundary Wall				59°19′19″N 2°59′12″W	Category B	18737	Upload another image
Rackwick, Old Berriedale				59°20′08″N 2°57′51″W	Category C(S)	48004	Upload Photo
Rusk Holm, House				59°12′22″N 2°51′14″W	Category C(S)	48009	Upload Photo
South Hamar				59°16′42″N 2°58′04″W	Category B	48012	Upload Photo
Swartaback				59°16′08″N 2°53′12″W	Category C(S)	48013	Upload Photo
Brough House, Including Boundary Wall				59°18′42″N 2°58′13″W	Category B	18733	Upload Photo
Pierowall, Trenabie Bere Mill				59°18′51″N 2°59′18″W	Category B	18734	Upload Photo
Braehead, Westray United Free Church Of Scotland Including Garden Wall				59°18′31″N 2°58′31″W	Category C(S)	47992	Upload Photo
Cornhouse				59°19′00″N 2°58′10″W	Category C(S)	47994	Upload Photo
Langskaill Old Manse, Farm				59°16′03″N 2°59′20″W	Category C(S)	47997	Upload Photo
Lochside, Pigsty And Shed				59°17′39″N 2°55′29″W	Category C(S)	47998	Upload Photo
Pierowall, Gill Point, Storehouse				59°19′27″N 2°58′23″W	Category B	48000	Upload Photo
Pierowall, Trenabie Mill Including Lade				59°18′51″N 2°59′18″W	Category B	48002	Upload Photo
Pierowall, Cottage St Clair				59°19′09″N 2°59′24″W	Category C(S)	47999	Upload Photo
Pierowall, War Memorial				59°19′23″N 2°59′12″W	Category C(S)	48003	Upload Photo
Skelwick, Hillhouse				59°17′01″N 2°54′00″W	Category C(S)	48011	Upload Photo

== Key ==
The scheme for classifying buildings in Scotland is:

- Category A: "buildings of national or international importance, either architectural or historic; or fine, little-altered examples of some particular period, style or building type."
- Category B: "buildings of regional or more than local importance; or major examples of some particular period, style or building type, which may have been altered."
- Category C: "buildings of local importance; lesser examples of any period, style, or building type, as originally constructed or moderately altered; and simple traditional buildings which group well with other listed buildings."

In March 2016 there were 47,288 listed buildings in Scotland. Of these, 8% were Category A, and 50% were Category B, with the remaining 42% being Category C.

== See also ==
- List of listed buildings in Orkney
