= Stand Round my Brave Boys =

British song

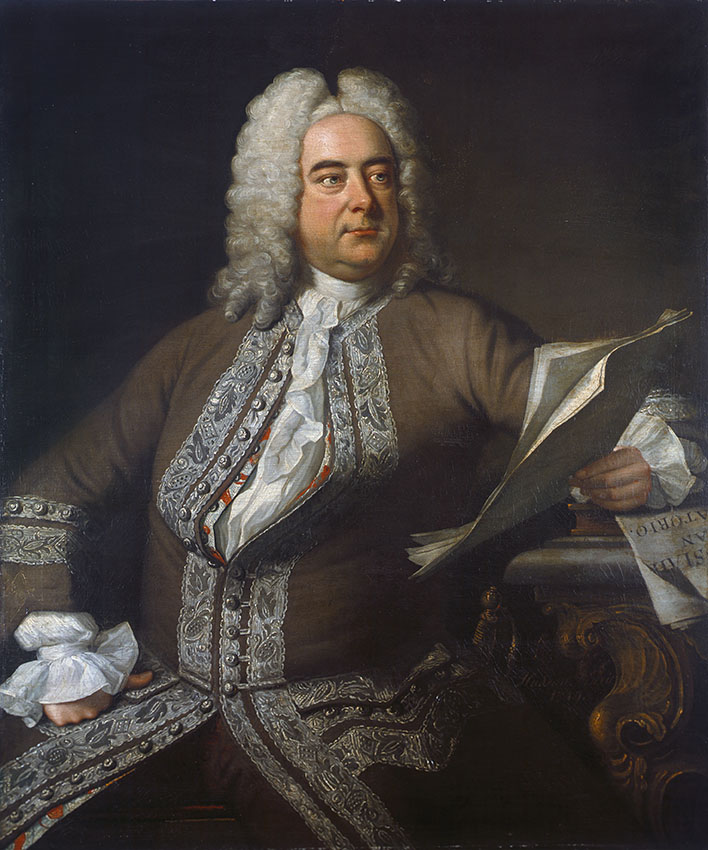
Georg Friedrich Händel in 1741.

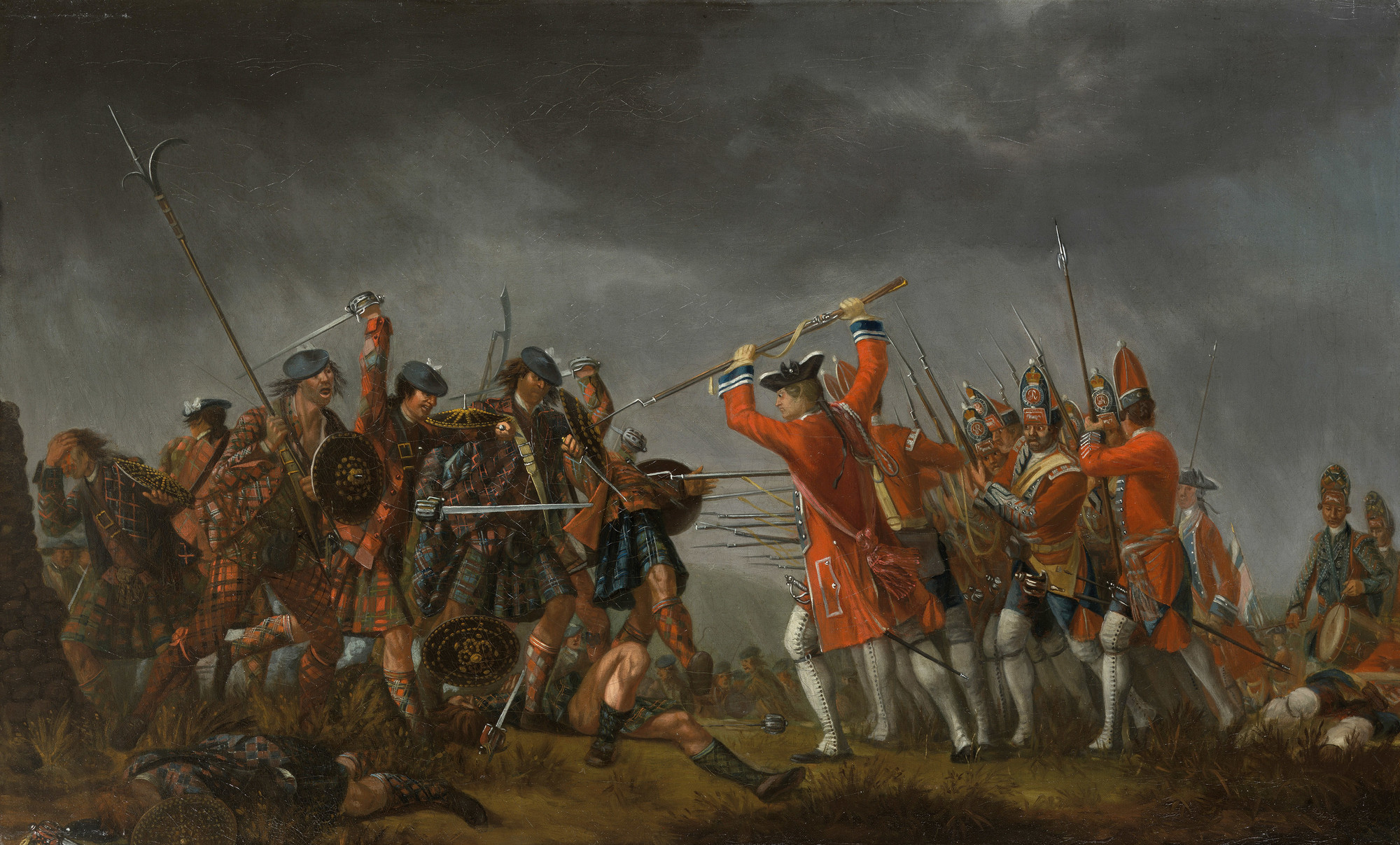
The Battle of Culloden during the Jacobite rising.

Stand Round my Brave Boys is a 1745 song composed by George Frideric Handel. It was commissioned to celebrate the Gentlemen Volunteers of the City of London, a regiment raised to resist the Jacobite Rebellion of 1745. Handel had close connections with the ruling House of Hanover, and composed several tunes supportive of a loyalist position opposed to the rival Jacobite House of Stuart during his career. It was part of the patriotic fervour that also saw God Save the King adopted as a popular song. Handel's piece was performed at the Theatre Royal, Drury Lane and then published on 14 November 1745. It was later included in the Jacobite Relics, a compilation of songs from the era.

== Lyrics ==
The lyrics for Stand Round my Brave Boys are present in Jacobite Relics where it is set to the tune of another song titled The Thistle and the Rose instead of the tune created by Handel. The lyrics present in that book are as follows:

Stand round, my brave boys, with heart and with voice,
And all in full chorus agree;
We'll fight for our king, and as loyally sing,
And let the world know we'll be free.

Chorus:
The rebels shall fly, as with shouts we draw nigh,
And echo shall victory ring;
While secure from alarms, we will rest on our arms,
And chorus it, "Long live the King."

With hearts firm and stout, we'll repel the bold rout,
And follow fair liberty's call;
We'll rush on our foe, and deal death in each blow,
Till conquest and honour crown all.

(Chorus)

Then commerce once more shall bring wealth to our shore,
And plenty and peace bless the isle;
The peasant shall quaff off his bowl with a laugh,
And reap the sweet fruits of his toil.

(Chorus)

Kind love shall repay the fatigues of the day,
And melt us to softer alarms;
Coy Phillis shall burn at her soldier's return,
And bless the brave youth in her arms.

(Chorus)

== See also ==
- From Scourging Rebellion, a 1746 song by Handel
- Judas Maccabaeus (Handel), a 1746 oratorio by Handel

== Bibliography ==
- Burrows, Donald. Handel. Oxford University Press, 2012.
- Harris, James. Music and Theatre in Handel's World: The Family Papers of James Harris, 1732-1780. Oxford University Press, 2002.
- Robinson, D.H. The Idea of Europe and the Origins of the American Revolution. Oxford University Press, 2020.
