= List of listed buildings in South Ronaldsay, Orkney =

This is a list of listed buildings in the parish of South Ronaldsay in Orkney, Scotland.

== List ==
Name	Location	Date Listed	Grid Ref. (Note: Sometimes known as OSGB36, the grid reference (where provided) is based on the British national grid reference system used by the Ordnance Survey. • "Guide to National Grid". Ordnance Survey. • "Get-a-map". Ordnance Survey.)	Geo-coordinates	Notes	LB Number (Note: Historic Environment Scotland assign a unique alphanumeric identifier to each designated site in Scotland, for listed buildings this always begins with "LB", for example "LB12345".)	Image
South Kirk (St Mary's) And Kirkyard And Kirkyard Gateway (Church Of Scotland)				58°44′33″N 2°58′10″W	Category B	18715	Upload another image See more images
Kirkhouse Meal Mill Widewall				58°43′01″N 2°58′38″W	Category B	18717	Upload Photo
St. Margaret's House Front Road				58°49′33″N 2°57′30″W	Category C(S)	18722	Upload Photo
Garden Gate Smiddy Bank				58°49′41″N 2°57′47″W	Category B	18724	Upload Photo
Pentland Skerries Lighthouses				58°41′25″N 2°55′29″W	Category A	18728	Upload Photo
South Parish, South Ronaldsay, Smithy, House And Ancillary Structures				58°45′11″N 2°57′35″W	Category B	45800	Upload Photo
'Lairdene' Front Road				58°49′33″N 2°57′29″W	Category C(S)	18721	Upload Photo
Sandwick House (New House)				58°47′25″N 2°58′17″W	Category B	18716	Upload Photo
Corner House (J. Spence & Sons) Front Road				58°49′33″N 2°57′31″W	Category C(S)	18723	Upload Photo
Store-House Westshore				58°50′37″N 2°55′22″W	Category B	18727	Upload Photo
South Ronaldsay, Burwick Farm, Including Ancillary Buildings				58°44′30″N 2°58′19″W	Category B	45661	Upload Photo
Swanson House Front Road				58°49′33″N 2°57′29″W	Category C(S)	18720	Upload Photo
Tomison's Academy				58°45′17″N 2°57′52″W	Category B	18726	Upload Photo
Bow Farmhouse (The Bu Of Burray)				58°51′28″N 2°53′39″W	Category B	19906	Upload Photo
North Kirk (St Peter's) And Kirkyard (Church Of Scotland)				58°48′07″N 2°55′04″W	Category A	18718	Upload Photo
Cara Mill				58°50′09″N 2°55′28″W	Category C(S)	18719	Upload Photo
Old Burray Kirk (St. Lawerence's)				58°51′08″N 2°52′57″W	Category B	18725	Upload Photo
St Margaret's Hope, Front Road, Harbour View				58°49′34″N 2°57′37″W	Category B	50149	Upload Photo
South Ronaldsay, The Old School House, Kiln Barn				58°45′07″N 2°57′49″W	Category C(S)	47379	Upload Photo

== Key ==
The scheme for classifying buildings in Scotland is:

- Category A: "buildings of national or international importance, either architectural or historic; or fine, little-altered examples of some particular period, style or building type."
- Category B: "buildings of regional or more than local importance; or major examples of some particular period, style or building type, which may have been altered."
- Category C: "buildings of local importance; lesser examples of any period, style, or building type, as originally constructed or moderately altered; and simple traditional buildings which group well with other listed buildings."

In March 2016 there were 47,288 listed buildings in Scotland. Of these, 8% were Category A, and 50% were Category B, with the remaining 42% being Category C.

== See also ==
- List of listed buildings in Orkney
