= Come O'er the Stream Charlie =

Song
- Language: Scots
- Published: 18th-century
- Genre: Revolutionary song

"Come O'er the Stream Charlie" (also called "Maclean's Welcome") is a Scottish song whose theme is the welcome the Young Pretender would receive prior to the Jacobite rising of 1745. The words are attributed to James Hogg, who said he adapted it from a Gaelic song. It appears in Hogg's 1821 Jacobite Relics.

Written well after the events it commemorates, it is not a genuine Jacobite song, as is the case with many others now considered in the "classic canon of Jacobite songs," most of which were songs "composed in the late eighteenth and nineteenth centuries, but were passed off as contemporary products of the Jacobite risings."

== Lyrics ==
Come O'er the Stream Charlie is titled Maclean's Welcome. From the Gaelic in Jacobite Relics The lyrics present in that book are as follows:

Chorus:
Come o'er the stream, Charlie, dear Charlie, brave Charlie,
Come o'er the stream, Charlie, and dine with Maclean;
And though you be weary, we'll make your heart cheery.
And welcome our Charlie and his loyal train.

We'll bring down the track deer, we'll bring down the black steer,
The lamb from the breckan, and doe from the glen;
The salt sea we'll harry, and bring to onr Charlie,
The cream from the bothy, and curd from the pen.

(Chorus)

And you shall drink freely the dews of Glen-Sheerly,
That stream in the star-light when kings do not ken;
And deep be your meed of the wine that is red,
To drink to your sire, and his friend the Maclean.

(Chorus)

O'er heath-bells shall trace you the maids to embrace you,
And deck your blue bonnet with flowers of the brae;
And the loveliest Mari in all Glen-M'Quarry
Shall lie in your bosom till break of the day.

(Chorus)

If aught will invite you, or more will delight you,
'Tis ready, a troop of our bold Highlandmen:
Shall range on the heather with bonnet and feather,
Strong arms and broad claymores three hundred and ten.
