= Jacobite Relics =

Compendium of songs by James Hogg

Jacobite Relics of Scotland; Being the Songs, Airs and Legends of the Adherents to the house of Stuart
- Author: James Hogg
- Language: English/Scots
- Subject: Jacobitism
- Genre: Song book
- Publisher: William Blackwood
- Publication date: 1819 (1st volume); 1821 (2nd volume)
- Publication place: Edinburgh
- Pages: 424 (1st volume); 480 (2nd volume)
- Text: Jacobite Relics of Scotland; Being the Songs, Airs and Legends of the Adherents to the house of Stuart at Wikisource

Jacobite Relics is a two volume collection of songs related to Jacobitism and Jacobite risings, compiled by the Scottish poet and novelist James Hogg on commission from the Highland Society of London in 1817. Most of the songs in the collection are Jacobite, and a minority are Whig. A number of the songs were written or adapted by Robert Burns and scholars speculate as to how many of them were authored or at least substantially altered by Hogg himself.

The first volume was published in 1819 under the title The Jacobite Relics of Scotland; Being the Songs, Airs, and Legends, of the Adherents to the House of Stuart. The second volume was published in 1821. An edited version of the work was published in 2002 (Volume 1) and 2003 (Volume 2) by Edinburgh University Press as Volumes 10 and 12 of the Stirling/South Carolina Research Edition of The Complete Works of James Hogg. The editor was Murray G. H. Pittock.

After being revived by Ewan MacColl, several of the songs included gained new popularity in the 20th century through performances by musicians such as The Corries, Steeleye Span and Eddi Reader, among others – most notably Ye Jacobites by Name (#34), Cam Ye o'er frae France (#53) and Such a Parcel of Rogues in a Nation (#36).

== List of songs ==
=== The numbered songs (with music) ===
==== Volume 1 ====
1. The King shall enjoy his own again
2. The Haughs of Cromdale (Roud 5147)
3. Lesley's March to Scotland
4. Lesley's March to Longmaston Moor
5. The Restoration
6. The Royal Oak Tree
7. Tree of Friendship
8. The Drowning of Care
9. Hey, then, up go we
10. You're welcome, Whigs, from Bothwell Brigs
11. Cakes o' Crowdy
12. There cam' a Fiddler out o' Fife
13. Ne'er to return
14. King William's March
15. It was a' for our rightfu' King
16. Three good Fellows ayont you Glen
17. The Battle of Killicrankie
18. Prælium Gilliecrankianum
19. Killicrankie (Roud 8187)
20. The Devil o'er Stirling
21. Willie the Wag
22. The Cameronian Cat
23. Carle, an the King come
24. Willie Winkie's Testament
25. The Act of Succession
26. Would you know what a Whig is
27. When the King comes o'er the Water
28. Freedom's Farewell
29. Come, fill your Bowls
30. The King shall enjoy his own
31. Here's a Health to them that's away
32. Over the Seas and far awa
33. I hae nae Kith, I hae nae Kin
34. Ye Jacobites by Name (Roud 5517)
35. My Love he was a Highland Lad
36. Such a Parcel of Rogues in a Nation (Roud 5516)
37. This is no my ain House
38. There'll never be Peace till Jamie comes hame
39. The Awkward Squad
40. The Union
41. The Thistle and the Rose
42. Queen Anne; or, The Auld Gray Mare
43. Bishop Burnet's Descent into Hell
44. A wicked old Peer
45. Sarum's Dirge
46. Awa, Whigs, awa
47. The Broad Swords of Scotland
48. There was a Man came from the Moon
49. At Auchindown
50. The Riding Mare
51. The wee wee German Lairdie (Roud 2573)
52. The Ringing o't
53. Came ye o'er frae France (Roud 5814)
54. Let our great James come over
55. The Sow's Tail to Geordie
56. Plain Truth
57. The Pilfering Brood
58. Kirn-milk Geordie
59. Come, let us drink a Health, Boys
60. Donald Macgillavry
61. Jamie the Rover
62. The Curses
63. Perfidious Britain
64. The Thistle of Scotland
65. Frae the Friends and Land I love
66. Here's to the King, Sir
67. The Cuckoo
68. The Rebellious Crew
69. My Laddie
70. Geordie Whelps' Testament
71. O, royal James
72. The auld Stuarts back again
73. Down among the Dead Men
74. Robin John Clark
75. Both Sides the Tweed
76. The Fifth of November
77. The Bonny Moorhen
78. The Waes o' Scotland
79. Lochmaben Gate
80. Hame, Hame, Hame
81. Our ain Country
82. Marilla
83. A South-Sea Ballad
84. O, beautiful Britannia
85. Nobody can deny
86. James, come kiss me now
87. What Murrain now has ta'en the Whigs
88. True Blue
89. Will ye go to Sheriffmuir
90. The Chevalier's Muster-Roll

==== Volume 2 ====
1. The Battle of Sheriffmuir
2. Dialogue, &c. &c.
3. Dialogue, &c. &c. Modern Set
4. From Bogie Side; or, The Marquis's Raide
5. Up an' waur them a, Willie
6. O my King
7. Aikendrum (Roud 2571)
8. He winna be guided by me
9. Kenmure's on an' awa, Willie
10. Derwentwater
11. Lord Derwentwater's Goodnight
12. The Young Maxwell
13. Lament for the Lord Maxwell
14. The Lusty Carlin
15. What ails thee, poor Shepherd
16. The Tenth of June
17. The Whigs o' Fife
18. The White Cockade
19. The Piper of Dundee
20. Here's a Health to the valiant Swede
21. Three Healths
22. Somebody
23. For an Apple of Gold
24. The King's Anthem
25. Britons who dare to claim
26. There was a Cooper
27. Tho' Geordie reigns in Jamie's Stead
28. O how shall I venture
29. Merry may the Keel row
30. Highland Harry
31. The Man o' the Moon
32. Whurry Whigs awa
33. The Blackbird
34. Our ain bonny Laddie
35. Come let us be jovial
36. The Clans are coming
37. The Clans are all away
38. O'er the Water to Charlie
39. An yon be he
40. Song of Expostulations
41. Lewie Gordon
42. He comes, he comes, the hero comes
43. Macdonald's Gathering. From the Gaelic
44. To daunton me
45. To daunton me Second Set
46. To daunton me Third Set
47. Be valiant still
48. Maclean's Welcome. From the Gaelic
49. Charlie is my Darling (Modern) (Roud 5510)
50. Charlie is my Darling (Original)
51. Turn the Blue Bonnet wha can, wha can
52. The Athol Gathering
53. The Gathering Rant
54. Wha wadna fight for Charlie
55. An excellent new Song on the Rebellion
56. A lamentable Ditty on the Death of Geordie
57. Turnimspike
58. Johnnie Cope (Roud 2315)
59. Johnnie Cope Second Set
60. O my bonny Highland Laddie
61. The Battle of Prestonpans
62. The Highland Laddie
63. Cock up your Beaver
64. To your arms, my bonny Highland Lads
65. By the side of a country Kirk Wall
66. The Mayor of Carlisle
67. The Battle of Falkirk Moor
68. The Highlandmen came down the Hill
69. Anns and the Man
70. Welcome, Royal Charlie
71. Welcome, Royal Charlie Second Set
72. Kane to the King. From the Gaelic
73. Young Airly
74. Young Airly Another Set
75. Bonny Charlie
76. Callum-a-Glen. From the Gaelic
77. The Sun rises bright in France
78. The Old Man's Lament
79. Now Charles asserts his Father's right
80. Farewell to Glen-Shalloch. From the Gaelic
81. The Lovely Lass of Inverness
82. The Lovely Lass of Inverness Modern Set
83. The Frasers in the Correi. From the Gaelic
84. A Balland, &c.
85. The Highlander's Lament
86. Prince Charles and Flora Macdonald's Welcome to Sky
87. The Highland Widow's Lament
88. Here's his Health in Water
89. Up an' rin awa, Willie
90. The Lament of Flora Macdonald. From the Gaelic
91. The Tears of Scotland
92. Gladsmuir
93. You're welcome, Charlie Stuart
94. The Highlander's Farewell. From the Gaelic
95. Towly's Ghost
96. Lenachan's Farewell. From the Gaelic
97. Bessy's Haggies
98. Waes me for Prince Charlie (Modern)
99. Charlie Stuart
100. Culloden Day. From the Gaelic
101. Will he no come back again
102. The Battle of Val
103. Carlisle Yetts
104. Cumberland and Murray's Descent into Hell
105. Geordie sits in Charlie's Chair
106. Lawland Lassie
107. Highland Laddie (Modern)
108. On the restoration of the Forfeited Estates, 1784
109. The Hill of Lochiel. From the Gaelic
110. Lassie, lie near me

=== Appendix (without music) ===
==== Jacobite songs listed in the appendix ====
===== Volume 1 =====
- A Tory in a Whig's Coat
- John Hielandman's Visit to the Quarter Session
- Albany
- The Cannons now are at a Stand
- The Removal of the Parliament from London to Oxford
- Donald Cowper
- Information
- The Present State of England
- Titus Telltroth
- Ignoramus
- The Man of Fashion
- The Loyal Health
- A Narrative of the old Plot; being a new Song
- Jack Presbyter's Wish
- The Pot-Companions
- The Protestant Flail
- The Royal Litany
- The Loyal Conquest
- Whig upon Whig
- Eustace Comines, the Irish Evidence, his Farewell to England
- Dagon's Fall
- Lament for the Apprehending of Sir Thomas Armstrong
- Pluto, the Prince of Darkness, &c.
- The Whigs exposed
- An excellent new Song, &c.
- The Royal Admiral
- The Happy Return of the Old Dutch Miller
- There's none so happy as we
- Patience Ward
- Hail to the Prince of the Plot
- Honest Redcoat
- The Western Rebel
- The Loyal Irishman
- The Plot is rent and torn
- A new Litany
- The Constitution restored in 1711

===== Volume 2 =====
- The Bee-Hive
- Over the Seas an' far awa
- The Wind has blawn my Plaid away
- Over the Seas an' far away
- Let Misers tremble o'er their wealth
- The Gathering of the Clans
- Britons now retrieve your glory
- The Whigs' Glory (Modern)
- Scotland's Call
- Owre the Muir amang the Heather (Modern)
- The Lady looked frae her Ha'
- The appearance of Cromwell's Ghost on tire eve of the battle of Culloden
- Culloden
- Bauldy Fraser
- Culloden; or Lochiel's Farewell
- The Chevalier's Lament
- Strathallan's Lament
- The Song of M'Rimmon Glash. From the Gaelic
- Prince Charles's Lament
- The Fate of Charlie
- Bannocks o' Barley
- The Emigrant
- The Exile's Return
- Lament of old Duncan Skene, of Clan Donochie. From the Gaelic
- Though rugged and rough be the Land of my Birth

==== Whig songs listed in the appendix ====
Hogg states that he believed that these were all of English origin

===== Volume 1 =====
- Fifth of November
- Song on the Thirtieth of January 1696
- A Health
- King William's Birth-Day
- Haste over, Hanover, fast as you can over
- Loyalty displayed, &c.
- The French King's Thanks and Advice, &c.
- The Age of Wonders
- Tantivy Tory
- Nothing but Truth
- God prosper long this freeborn Isle
- The Truth at last
- If now at last we must give up Spain
- George at last shall wear the Crown
- The Merchant a-la-Mode
- A Litany
- Hey, Boys, up go we
- The First Psalm
- Advice to Britons
- The High-Church Alarm
- The Raree Show
- Raree Show
- First of August
- First of August
- First of August
- First of August
- No Popery here shall thrive
- Tories' Lamentation
- Vile Tricksters and Greggsters
- Advice to the Tories
- King George's Birth-Day
- Now, now is come the glorious Year
- Brunswick Mum
- That Protestants with Protestants
- On his Majesty's Coronation
- Here's a Health to the King
- No more the Danger of the Church
- Rue and Tyme
- On the Breaking out of the Rebellion
- The High-Church shall never make Perkin a King
- The Pretender's Army

===== Volume 2 =====
- Nobody can deny
- In vain are the Hopes of a Popish Pretender
- The Jacobites' Downfall
- Perkin's Lament
- The Ablution
- The Raree Show
- The Raree Show
- The right and true History of Perkin
- High Church Loyalty
- The Battle o' Dumblane
- The Ape entrapped must not complain
- In troth, Friend Harry
- Perkin's Last adventure; or a Trip through the Back-Door
- The Latter end of the Tories
- A Trip to the Mountains
- Nobody can deny
- O Brother Sandie, hear ye the News
- Over the Hills an' far away
- Ye freeborn Hearts, that hold most dear
- 'Twas at the Hour of dark Midnight
- Haud awa frae me, Donald
- Fame, let thy Trumpet sound
- Stand round, my brave Boys
- The Battle of Falkirk
- Your glasses charge high, 'tis in brave William's praise
- Come let the Toast go round
- Few good Fellows when Willie's awa
- Ye Britons, ye Freemen
- Willie is a warlike Prince
- Up an' waur them a', Willie
- A Health to the Constitution
- Anniversary of Culloden
- Bonny Laddie, Highland Laddie
- In Edina's fair City
- Bonny bonny Beef
- How happy are we
- Fragments
