= List of listed buildings in Orkney =

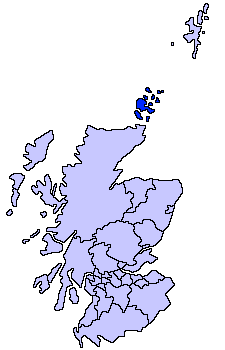
Orkney shown within Scotland

This is a list of listed buildings in Orkney, Scotland. The list is split out by parish.

- List of listed buildings in Birsay And Harray, Orkney
- List of listed buildings in Cross And Burness, Orkney
- List of listed buildings in Eday, Orkney
- List of listed buildings in Evie And Rendall, Orkney
- List of listed buildings in Firth, Orkney
- List of listed buildings in Holm, Orkney
- List of listed buildings in Hoy And Graemsay, Orkney
- List of listed buildings in Kirkwall And St Ola, Orkney
- List of listed buildings in Kirkwall, Orkney
- List of listed buildings in Lady, Orkney
- List of listed buildings in Orphir, Orkney
- List of listed buildings in Papa Westray, Orkney
- List of listed buildings in Rousay And Egilsay, Orkney
- List of listed buildings in Sandwick, Orkney
- List of listed buildings in Shapinsay, Orkney
- List of listed buildings in South Ronaldsay, Orkney
- List of listed buildings in St Andrews And Deerness, Orkney
- List of listed buildings in Stenness, Orkney
- List of listed buildings in Stromness, Orkney
- List of listed buildings in Stronsay, Orkney
- List of listed buildings in Walls And Flotta, Orkney
- List of listed buildings in Westray, Orkney

== See also ==
- List of Category A listed buildings in Orkney
- Scheduled monuments in Orkney
