= List of listed buildings in Stronsay, Orkney =

This is a list of listed buildings in the parish of Stronsay in Orkney, Scotland.

== List ==
Name	Location	Date Listed	Grid Ref. (Note: Sometimes known as OSGB36, the grid reference (where provided) is based on the British national grid reference system used by the Ordnance Survey. • "Guide to National Grid". Ordnance Survey. • "Get-a-map". Ordnance Survey.)	Geo-coordinates	Notes	LB Number (Note: Historic Environment Scotland assign a unique alphanumeric identifier to each designated site in Scotland, for listed buildings this always begins with "LB", for example "LB12345".)	Image
Stronsay, Holland				59°05′08″N 2°35′35″W	Category C(S)	47413	Upload Photo
Sanson's Lane Farm-House				59°06′52″N 2°36′29″W	Category B	18636	Upload Photo
Huip Farmhouse, Walled Garden And Steading				59°09′30″N 2°38′11″W	Category C(S)	18822	Upload Photo
Stronsay Meal Mill Lower Millfield				59°06′54″N 2°35′51″W	Category B	18635	Upload Photo
Lower Millfield Farm, Including Outbuildings And Boundary Walls				59°06′56″N 2°35′53″W	Category B	19663	Upload Photo
Auskerry Lighthouse				59°01′33″N 2°34′20″W	Category B	18638	Upload Photo
Papa Stronsay House				59°08′53″N 2°35′06″W	Category B	18637	Upload Photo
Moncur Memorial Church (Church Of Scotland)				59°06′43″N 2°36′20″W	Category C(S)	51035	Upload Photo

== Key ==
The scheme for classifying buildings in Scotland is:

- Category A: "buildings of national or international importance, either architectural or historic; or fine, little-altered examples of some particular period, style or building type."
- Category B: "buildings of regional or more than local importance; or major examples of some particular period, style or building type, which may have been altered."
- Category C: "buildings of local importance; lesser examples of any period, style, or building type, as originally constructed or moderately altered; and simple traditional buildings which group well with other listed buildings."

In March 2016 there were 47,288 listed buildings in Scotland. Of these, 8% were Category A, and 50% were Category B, with the remaining 42% being Category C.

== See also ==
- List of listed buildings in Orkney
