= List of listed buildings in Shapinsay, Orkney =

This is a list of listed buildings in the parish of Shapinsay in Orkney, Scotland.

== List ==
Name	Location	Date listed	Geo-coordinates	Notes	Category	LB number	Image
7 And 8 Balfour Village			59°01′56″N 2°54′34″W		C(S)	19896	Upload Photo
5 Balfour Village			59°01′55″N 2°54′33″W		C(S)	18622	Upload Photo
6 Balfour Village			59°01′55″N 2°54′33″W		C(S)	18623	Upload Photo
9 Balfour Village			59°01′56″N 2°54′34″W		C(S)	18624	Upload Photo
23 And 24 Balfour Village			59°02′00″N 2°54′34″W		B	19897	Upload Photo
12-22 (Consecutive) Balfour Village			59°01′59″N 2°54′33″W		C(S)	18627	Upload Photo
Gate-Piers Balfour Castle			59°01′52″N 2°54′37″W		C(S)	18618	Upload Photo
Shapinsay Kirk (South Church)			59°01′59″N 2°52′06″W		B	18612	Upload Photo
Balfour Burial Aisle South Churchyard			59°01′59″N 2°52′05″W		B	18613	Upload another image
Balfour Castle (With Garden Gateway) Sound			59°01′54″N 2°55′00″W		A	18615	Upload another image
Balfour Castle Doocot,			59°01′47″N 2°54′36″W		B	18616	Upload another image
Shapinsay Meal Mill Ellwick			59°02′11″N 2°53′56″W		B	18614	Upload Photo
Shapinsay Lighthouse			59°01′08″N 2°54′04″W		B	18619	Upload another image
3 And 4 Balfour Village			59°01′55″N 2°54′34″W		C(S)	18621	Upload Photo
Stone Lodge (Gate-Lodge,) Balfour Castle			59°01′52″N 2°54′37″W		B	18617	Upload Photo
10 Balfour Village			59°01′56″N 2°54′34″W		B	18625	Upload Photo
Balfour Village The Smithy			59°01′57″N 2°54′33″W		B	18626	Upload another image
2 Balfour Village			59°01′55″N 2°54′34″W		C(S)	18620	Upload Photo

== Key ==
The scheme for classifying buildings in Scotland is:

- Category A: "buildings of national or international importance, either architectural or historic; or fine, little-altered examples of some particular period, style or building type."
- Category B: "buildings of regional or more than local importance; or major examples of some particular period, style or building type, which may have been altered."
- Category C: "buildings of local importance; lesser examples of any period, style, or building type, as originally constructed or moderately altered; and simple traditional buildings which group well with other listed buildings."

In March 2016 there were 47,288 listed buildings in Scotland. Of these, 8% were Category A, and 50% were Category B, with the remaining 42% being Category C.

== See also ==
- List of listed buildings in Orkney
