= List of listed buildings in Lady, Orkney =

This is a list of listed buildings in the parish of Lady in Orkney, Scotland.

== List ==
Name	Location	Date Listed	Grid Ref. (Note: Sometimes known as OSGB36, the grid reference (where provided) is based on the British national grid reference system used by the Ordnance Survey. • "Guide to National Grid". Ordnance Survey. • "Get-a-map". Ordnance Survey.)	Geo-coordinates	Notes	LB Number (Note: Historic Environment Scotland assign a unique alphanumeric identifier to each designated site in Scotland, for listed buildings this always begins with "LB", for example "LB12345".)	Image
Lopness Doocot				59°16′43″N 2°25′22″W	Category B	12674	Upload Photo
Start Point Lighthouse				59°16′39″N 2°22′33″W	Category B	12675	Upload Photo
Sanday, Tresness House And Steading				59°14′04″N 2°31′15″W	Category B	12676	Upload Photo
Geramount Lodge Including Garden Walls				59°14′52″N 2°33′43″W	Category B	49621	Upload Photo
Lopness House				59°16′46″N 2°25′28″W	Category B	12673	Upload Photo

== Key ==
The scheme for classifying buildings in Scotland is:

- Category A: "buildings of national or international importance, either architectural or historic; or fine, little-altered examples of some particular period, style or building type."
- Category B: "buildings of regional or more than local importance; or major examples of some particular period, style or building type, which may have been altered."
- Category C: "buildings of local importance; lesser examples of any period, style, or building type, as originally constructed or moderately altered; and simple traditional buildings which group well with other listed buildings."

In March 2016 there were 47,288 listed buildings in Scotland. Of these, 8% were Category A, and 50% were Category B, with the remaining 42% being Category C.

== See also ==
- List of listed buildings in Orkney
