= List of listed buildings in Orphir, Orkney =

This is a list of listed buildings in the parish of Orphir in Orkney, Scotland.

== List ==
Name	Location	Date Listed	Grid Ref. (Note: Sometimes known as OSGB36, the grid reference (where provided) is based on the British national grid reference system used by the Ordnance Survey. • "Guide to National Grid". Ordnance Survey. • "Get-a-map". Ordnance Survey.)	Geo-coordinates	Notes	LB Number (Note: Historic Environment Scotland assign a unique alphanumeric identifier to each designated site in Scotland, for listed buildings this always begins with "LB", for example "LB12345".)	Image
St. Nicholas' Chapel And The Earls' Bu				58°55′19″N 3°09′24″W	Category A	18579	Upload another image
Hobbister House				58°56′49″N 3°04′09″W	Category C(S)	18575	Upload Photo
Grindally House				58°55′15″N 3°10′07″W	Category C(S)	18580	Upload Photo
Hall of Clestrain				58°56′51″N 3°13′27″W	Category A	19892	Upload another image See more images
Swanbister House				58°55′48″N 3°07′45″W	Category B	19891	Upload Photo
Kirbister Meal Mill Kirbister				58°56′47″N 3°05′55″W	Category B	18576	Upload Photo
Old Orphir School, Kirbister				58°56′43″N 3°06′11″W	Category B	18577	Upload Photo
Orphir House (Hall Of Gyre)				58°55′24″N 3°08′49″W	Category C(S)	18578	Upload Photo
Quoy Of Howton				58°54′59″N 3°11′45″W	Category C(S)	18582	Upload Photo
Howth Farmhouse				58°55′06″N 3°11′25″W	Category C(S)	18581	Upload Photo

== Key ==
The scheme for classifying buildings in Scotland is:

- Category A: "buildings of national or international importance, either architectural or historic; or fine, little-altered examples of some particular period, style or building type."
- Category B: "buildings of regional or more than local importance; or major examples of some particular period, style or building type, which may have been altered."
- Category C: "buildings of local importance; lesser examples of any period, style, or building type, as originally constructed or moderately altered; and simple traditional buildings which group well with other listed buildings."

In March 2016 there were 47,288 listed buildings in Scotland. Of these, 8% were Category A, and 50% were Category B, with the remaining 42% being Category C.

== See also ==
- List of listed buildings in Orkney
