= List of listed buildings in Evie And Rendall, Orkney =

This is a list of listed buildings in the parish of Evie And Rendall in Orkney, Scotland.

== List ==
| Name | Location | Date Listed | Grid Ref. (Note: Sometimes known as OSGB36, the grid reference (where provided) is based on the British national grid reference system used by the Ordnance Survey. • "Guide to National Grid". Ordnance Survey. • "Get-a-map". Ordnance Survey.) | Geo-coordinates | Notes | LB Number (Note: Historic Environment Scotland assign a unique alphanumeric identifier to each designated site in Scotland, for listed buildings this always begins with "LB", for example "LB12345".) | Image |
|---|---|---|---|---|---|---|---|
| Woodwick Doocot | | | | 59°05′56″N 3°03′59″W | Category B | 12714 | Upload Photo |
| Breck Farmhouse And Steading | | | | 59°04′08″N 3°01′01″W | Category B | 12717 | Upload Photo |
| Rendall Doocot | | | | 59°04′11″N 3°00′31″W | Category B | 12716 | Upload another image |
| Langskaill | | | | 59°04′50″N 2°59′16″W | Category B | 12718 | Upload Photo |
| Crook Farm-House | | | | 59°05′00″N 3°02′10″W | Category B | 12715 | Upload Photo |

== Key ==
The scheme for classifying buildings in Scotland is:

- Category A: "buildings of national or international importance, either architectural or historic; or fine, little-altered examples of some particular period, style or building type."
- Category B: "buildings of regional or more than local importance; or major examples of some particular period, style or building type, which may have been altered."
- Category C: "buildings of local importance; lesser examples of any period, style, or building type, as originally constructed or moderately altered; and simple traditional buildings which group well with other listed buildings."

In March 2016 there were 47,288 listed buildings in Scotland. Of these, 8% were Category A, and 50% were Category B, with the remaining 42% being Category C.

== See also ==
- List of listed buildings in Orkney
