= List of listed buildings in Hoy and Graemsay, Orkney =

This is a list of listed buildings in the parish of Hoy And Graemsay in Orkney, Scotland.

== List ==
Name	Location	Date Listed	Grid Ref. (Note: Sometimes known as OSGB36, the grid reference (where provided) is based on the British national grid reference system used by the Ordnance Survey. • "Guide to National Grid". Ordnance Survey. • "Get-a-map". Ordnance Survey.)	Geo-coordinates	Notes	LB Number (Note: Historic Environment Scotland assign a unique alphanumeric identifier to each designated site in Scotland, for listed buildings this always begins with "LB", for example "LB12345".)	Image
Graemsay, Hoy Sound Low Lighthouse, Including Keepers' Houses, Boundary Walls And Gatepiers				58°56′23″N 3°18′36″W	Category B	13841	Upload Photo
Hoy, Burra House, Including Boundary Walls, Gatepiers And Ancillary Range With Kiln				58°55′01″N 3°19′29″W	Category B	12891	Upload Photo
Graemsay, Sandside Farmhouse, Including Steading And Slipway				58°56′04″N 3°16′33″W	Category B	12892	Upload Photo
Graemsay, Hoy Sound High Lighthouse Including Keepers' Houses, Boundary Walls And Gatepiers				58°56′08″N 3°16′25″W	Category A	12736	Upload Photo
Hoy, Bu Of Hoy, Including Ancillary Buildings And Boundary Walls				58°55′23″N 3°19′41″W	Category B	12735	Upload Photo
Graemsay, Gorn				58°55′17″N 3°16′53″W	Category C(S)	46367	Upload Photo
Graemsay, Scarrataing				58°55′39″N 3°16′02″W	Category C(S)	46370	Upload Photo
Hoy, Rackwick, Muckle House, Including Ancillary Building				58°52′16″N 3°23′38″W	Category C(S)	46376	Upload Photo
Hoy, Rackwick, The Mount				58°52′32″N 3°23′27″W	Category C(S)	46377	Upload Photo
Hoy, East Linksness, Including Ancillary Buildings				58°54′58″N 3°19′05″W	Category B	46372	Upload Photo
Hoy, Orgil Farm				58°54′54″N 3°20′09″W	Category C(S)	46374	Upload Photo
Hoy, Hoy Lodge Including, Kennels, Boundary Walls And Gatepiers				58°54′54″N 3°20′19″W	Category B	13628	Upload Photo
Graemsay, Quoys, Including Outbuildings				58°56′01″N 3°17′23″W	Category C(S)	46369	Upload Photo
Hoy, Rackwick, Burnmouth, Including Boundary Walls				58°52′07″N 3°22′51″W	Category B	46375	Upload Photo
Greaemsay Kirk Including Graveyard				58°55′18″N 3°17′32″W	Category C(S)	46368	Upload Photo
Hoy, West End				58°54′22″N 3°18′07″W	Category C(S)	46378	Upload Photo
Graemsay, The Clett, Including Boundary Walls And Outbuildings				58°55′31″N 3°16′13″W	Category C(S)	46366	Upload Photo
Hoy, Newstead, Including Ancillary Building				58°54′19″N 3°19′04″W	Category C(S)	46373	Upload Photo

== Key ==
The scheme for classifying buildings in Scotland is:

- Category A: "buildings of national or international importance, either architectural or historic; or fine, little-altered examples of some particular period, style or building type."
- Category B: "buildings of regional or more than local importance; or major examples of some particular period, style or building type, which may have been altered."
- Category C: "buildings of local importance; lesser examples of any period, style, or building type, as originally constructed or moderately altered; and simple traditional buildings which group well with other listed buildings."

In March 2016 there were 47,288 listed buildings in Scotland. Of these, 8% were Category A, and 50% were Category B, with the remaining 42% being Category C.

== See also ==
- List of listed buildings in Orkney
