= Awa Whigs Awa =

Scottish song based on the Jacobite Rising of 1745

"Awa Whigs Awa" is a Scottish song whose theme is the aftermath of the Jacobite Rising of 1745. Written well after the events it commemorates, it is not a genuine Jacobite song, as is the case with many others now considered in the "classic canon of Jacobite songs," most of which were songs "composed in the late eighteenth and nineteenth centuries, but were passed off as contemporary products of the Jacobite risings." A version was published in 1789 by Robert Burns.

== Lyrics ==
The lyrics of Awa Whigs Awa present in Jacobite Relics are as follows:

Chorus:
Awa, Whigs, awa, awa, Whigs, awa,
Ye're but a pack o' traitor loons,
Ye'll ne'er do good at a'.

Our thristles flourish'd fresh and fair,
And bonny bloom'd our roses;
But Whigs came like a frost in June,
And wither'd a' our posies.

(Chorus)

Our sad decay in kirk and state
Surpasses my descriving;
The Whigs came o'er us for a curse,
And we hae done wi' thriving.

(Chorus)

A foreign whiggish loon brought seeds,
In Scottish yird to cover;
But we'll pu' a' his dibbled leeks.
And pack bim to Hanover,

(Chorus)

Our ancient crown's fa'n i' the dust,
Deil blind them wi' the stour o't.
And write their names i' his black beuk,
Wha ga'e the Whigs the power o't!

(Chorus)

Grim vengeance long has ta'en a nap,
But we may see him wauken:
Gude help the day, when royal heads
Are hunted like a maukin.

(Chorus)

The deil he heard the stour o' tongues.
And ramping came among us;
But he pitied us sae wi' cursed Whigs,
He turn'd, and wadna wrang us.

(Chorus)

Sae grim he sat among the reek,
Thrang bundling brunstane matches,
And croon'd 'mang the beuk-taking Whigs,
Scraps of auld Calvin's catches.

Awa, Whigs awa,
Awa, Whigs awa.
Ye'll rin me out o' wun spunks,
And ne'er do good at a'.
