= Hide and Hair =

Studio album by the Trials of Cato
- Released: 9 November 2018
- Genre: Folk
- Length: 40:48
- Label: Water Records
- Producer: The Trials of Cato

The Trials of Cato chronology
The Trials of Cato EP (2017)	Hide and Hair (2018)	Gog Magog (2022)

Hide and Hair is the debut album by British folk band the Trials of Cato, released on 9 November 2018. It won Best Album at the BBC Radio 2 Folk Awards in 2019.

== Reviews ==
Bright Young Folk, 2018. "The Trials of Cato have an incredibly rich and mature debut album that hits like a shot of folk concentrate."

Folking.com, 29 October 2018. "The eponymous debut EP by The Trials Of Cato came out of nowhere and smacked everyone between the eyes. Live, they are full of energy and their first full-length album, Hide And Hair, maintains their energy levels but also showcases just what great writers they are as well."

Folk Radio, 8 November 2018. "If there’s a more exciting debut album from a folk band this year, then I haven’t heard it. This is a very special release, and I can only suggest you get on board for hopefully a long and thrilling ride to come.".

For Folk's Sake, 10 November 2018. "The Trials of Cato are a band that raises the stakes for what folk music is today. With Hide And Hair, they break free of the genre by applying their own vision to the traditional form. There is no carelessness to their craft, they push the envelope of what folk is, and what it is to become."

Americana UK, 23 November 2018. "fine singing, fine songs, The Trails Of Cato are going to be around for a long time. Excellent stuff."

== Track listing ==
1. "Difyrrwch"
2. "Gloria"
3. "Haf"
4. "Kadisha"
5. "Gawain"
6. "Libanus"
7. "Tom Paine's Bones"
8. "These Are the Things"
9. "My Love's in Germany"
10. "The Drinkers"

"Gloria" was released as a single on 10 October 2018.

== Personnel ==
The Trials of Cato

- Will Addison – bouzouki, accordion, percussion, vocals
- Robin Jones – mandolin, tenor banjo, vocals
- Tomos Williams – guitar, bass, vocals

Additional musicians:

- Stefan Hegerat – snare drum on "My Love's in Germany"

== Subject matter ==
"Difyrrwch", Welsh for "delight", the opening set, comprises three traditional folk songs. Two are Welsh and one is English, reflecting the countries of origin of the band members. The Welsh folk songs in this set are "Hen Ferchetan", "Difyrrwch Gwyr y Gogledd", and the English song is "Parson's Farewell".

"Gloria" tells the story of a young person discovering their identity.

"Haf", Welsh for "summer", describes a pleasant summer afternoon.

"Kadisha" is a set of celtic tunes including a cover of the jig "Calliope House" by David Richardson of the Scottish-Irish folk band The Boys of the Lough, and Frank’s Reel by John McCusker.

"Gawain" retells the story of Sir Gawain and the Green Knight.

"Tom Paine's Bones" is a cover of the 1995 song by folk singer Graham Moore about Thomas Paine.

"These Are the Things" is a protest song against economic inequality and right-wing "pull yourself up by your bootstraps" rhetoric.

"My Love's in Germany" sets to music the traditional Scottish poem by Hector Macneill.
