= It Was A' For Our Rightful King =

1796 song

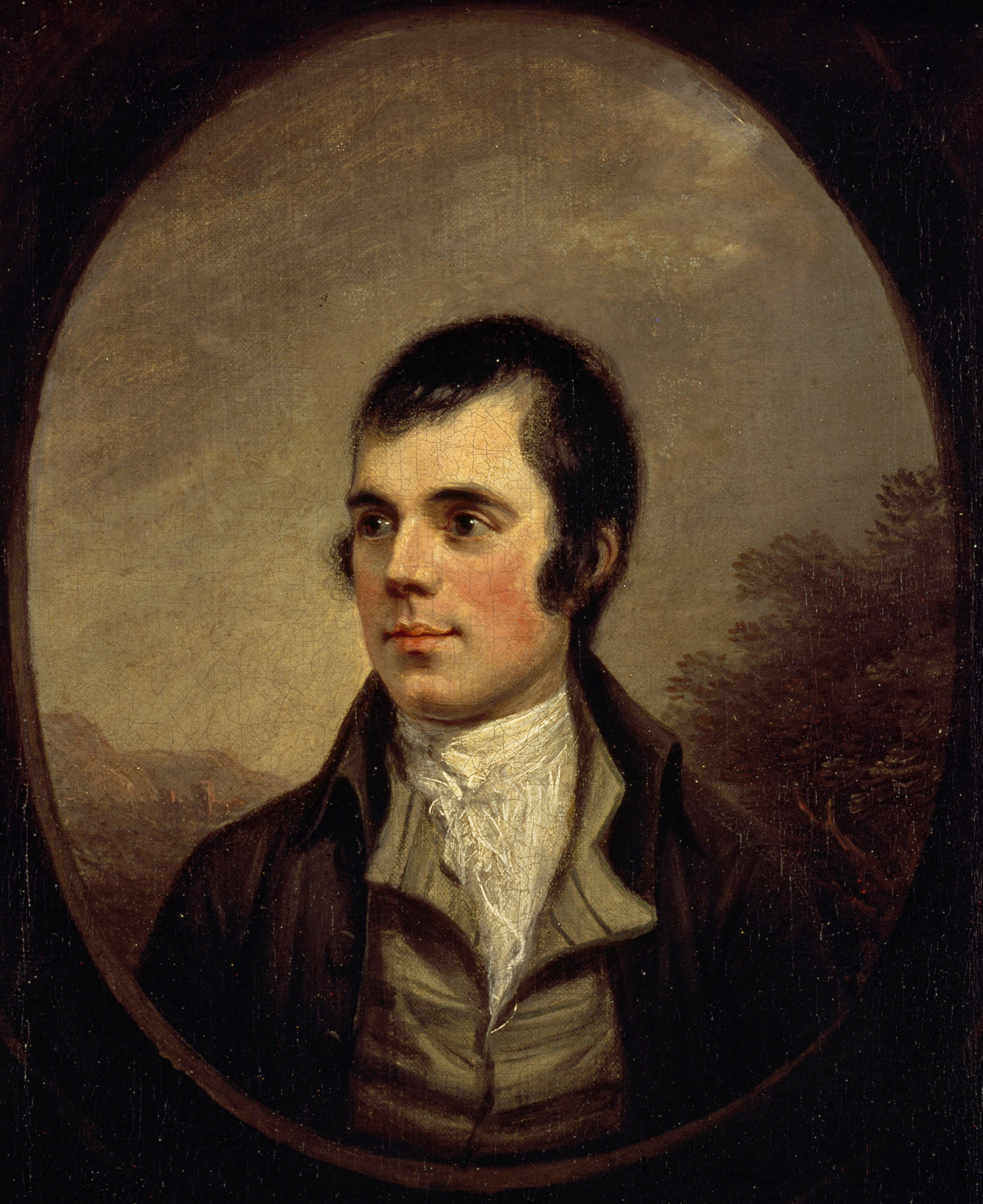
Robert Burns set the words to an older tune.

"It Was A' For Our Rightful King" (or "It was All For Our Rightful King") is a traditional Jacobite song. The words were written by Robert Burns and published in 1796. It is set to an older tune "Mally Stewart". It was included in the 1817 collection Jacobite Relics. Although dating from after the main period of Jacobite activity, it became a standard during the nostalgic Jacobite era of the nineteenth century.

It describes a Scottish supporter of King James taking up arms in support of the cause, going to Ireland to fight and thereafter going into exile after the failure of the campaign in Ireland.

== Lyrics ==
The lyrics of It Was A' For Our Rightful King present in Jacobite Relics are as follows:

It was a' for our rightfu' king
We left fair Scotland's strand!
It was a' for our rightfu' king
We e'er saw Irish land, my dear,
We e'er saw Irish land.

Now a' is done that men can do,
An' a' is done in vain:
My love an' native land, fareweel,
For I maun cross the main, my dear,
For I maun cross the main.

He turn'd him right an' round about,
Upon the Irish shore.
An' ga'e his bridle-reins a shake.
With, Adieu for evermore, my dear,
With, Adieu for evermore.

The sodger frae the wars returns,
The sailor frae the main;
But I hae parted frae my love,
Never to meet again, my dear,
Never to meet again.

When day is gane, an' night is come,
An' a' folk bound to sleep,
I think on him that's far awa,
The lee-lang night, an' weep, my dear,
The lee-lang night, an' weep.

== Bibliography ==
- Bold, Alan. A Burns Companion. Springer, 2016.
- Carruthers, Gerard & Kidd, Colin. Literature and Union: Scottish Texts, British Contexts. Oxford University Press, 2018.
- Gregory, David E. Victorian Songhunters: The Recovery and Editing of English Vernacular Ballads and Folk Lyrics, 1820–1883. Rowman & Littlefield, 2006.
