= List of listed buildings in St Andrews And Deerness, Orkney =

This is a list of listed buildings in the parish of St Andrews And Deerness in Orkney, Scotland.

== List ==
Name	Location	Date Listed	Grid Ref. (Note: Sometimes known as OSGB36, the grid reference (where provided) is based on the British national grid reference system used by the Ordnance Survey. • "Guide to National Grid". Ordnance Survey. • "Get-a-map". Ordnance Survey.)	Geo-coordinates	Notes	LB Number (Note: Historic Environment Scotland assign a unique alphanumeric identifier to each designated site in Scotland, for listed buildings this always begins with "LB", for example "LB12345".)	Image
Hall Of Tankerness, Steading, Including Farmhouse, Barn And Smithy				58°57′49″N 2°49′49″W	Category B	18830	Upload Photo
Tankerness, Sebay Farmhouse, Including Boundary Wall And Steading				58°56′07″N 2°49′50″W	Category C(S)	18571	Upload Photo
Copinsay Lighthouse, Including Foghorn And Keepers' Houses				58°53′47″N 2°40′19″W	Category B	18574	Upload another image See more images
Deerness, Braebuster, Including Farmhouse, Boundary Walls, Gatepiers, Steading, Kiln And Cottages				58°55′59″N 2°47′39″W	Category C(S)	46143	Upload Photo
Deerness, Cellardyke, Including Dwelling House And Barn				58°55′23″N 2°45′54″W	Category C(S)	46144	Upload Photo
Toab, Derbyshire				58°55′03″N 2°48′18″W	Category B	46154	Upload Photo
Tankerness Meal Mill, Including Boundary Wall And Lade				58°57′41″N 2°50′45″W	Category B	18567	Upload Photo
Hall Of Tankerness, St Andrew's Burial Ground, And Baikie Burial Vault				58°57′51″N 2°49′50″W	Category B	18570	Upload Photo
Tankerness Fishing Station, Including Curing House, Salt Warehouse, Bothy And Pier				58°57′44″N 2°49′55″W	Category B	46151	Upload Photo
Tankerness, (Linkness), The Ness, Including Threshing Barn And Wind Powered Water Pump				58°58′09″N 2°47′44″W	Category C(S)	46152	Upload Photo
Tankerness, Old St Andrews Manse, Including Boundary Wall, Ancillary Building And Cottage				58°57′47″N 2°50′36″W	Category B	18568	Upload Photo
Deerness, Mirkady Steading, Including Farmhouse And Horse Mill				58°56′49″N 2°47′55″W	Category C(S)	46147	Upload Photo
Deerness, North House				58°57′07″N 2°45′49″W	Category B	46148	Upload Photo
Deerness, Skaill, St Ninian's Church, (Church Of Scotland) Including Walled Churchyard And Railings				58°56′33″N 2°43′01″W	Category B	18572	Upload Photo
Deerness, The Covenanter's Memorial				58°57′46″N 2°44′54″W	Category B	18573	Upload another image See more images
Deerness, Bisgarth Manse				58°55′55″N 2°43′07″W	Category B	48328	Upload Photo
Tankerness, Yinstay, Scarpigar Farm Buildings				58°58′48″N 2°51′31″W	Category B	46153	Upload Photo
Tankerness, Sebay Meal Mill				58°55′36″N 2°50′35″W	Category B	19890	Upload Photo
Tankerness, St Andrew's Kirk, (North Church), (Church Of Scotland)				58°57′22″N 2°51′05″W	Category C(S)	18566	Upload Photo
Hall Of Tankerness, Including Boundary Walls And Gatepiers				58°57′52″N 2°49′48″W	Category B	18569	Upload Photo
Canniemyre				58°55′11″N 2°51′19″W	Category C(S)	46142	Upload Photo
Deerness, Mirkady Point, Mirkady Fishing Station				58°56′47″N 2°48′20″W	Category B	46146	Upload Photo
Deerness, Quoypettie, Including Ancillary Structures				58°56′31″N 2°44′32″W	Category C(S)	46149	Upload Photo
Deerness, Former School And Schoolhouse (Vinya Heim) Including Boundary Walls And Lavatory Block				58°55′55″N 2°45′38″W	Category C(S)	46150	Upload Photo

== Key ==
The scheme for classifying buildings in Scotland is:

- Category A: "buildings of national or international importance, either architectural or historic; or fine, little-altered examples of some particular period, style or building type."
- Category B: "buildings of regional or more than local importance; or major examples of some particular period, style or building type, which may have been altered."
- Category C: "buildings of local importance; lesser examples of any period, style, or building type, as originally constructed or moderately altered; and simple traditional buildings which group well with other listed buildings."

In March 2016 there were 47,288 listed buildings in Scotland. Of these, 8% were Category A, and 50% were Category B, with the remaining 42% being Category C.

== See also ==
- List of listed buildings in Orkney
