= List of listed buildings in Birsay And Harray, Orkney =

This is a list of listed buildings in the parish of Birsay And Harray, in Orkney, Scotland.

== List ==
| Name | Location | Date Listed | Grid Ref. (Note: Sometimes known as OSGB36, the grid reference (where provided) is based on the British national grid reference system used by the Ordnance Survey. • "Guide to National Grid". Ordnance Survey. • "Get-a-map". Ordnance Survey.) | Geo-coordinates | Notes | LB Number (Note: Historic Environment Scotland assign a unique alphanumeric identifier to each designated site in Scotland, for listed buildings this always begins with "LB", for example "LB12345".) | Image |
|---|---|---|---|---|---|---|---|
| Twatt Airfield (Former HMS Tern), Air-Raid Shelters | | | | 59°05′08″N 3°17′38″W | Category C(S) | 51784 | Upload Photo |
| Earl's Palace, Birsay | | | | 59°07′48″N 3°18′56″W | Category A | 6172 | Upload another image |
| Old (Second) Birsay Manse(Rj Norquay) | | | | 59°07′41″N 3°18′48″W | Category B | 6174 | Upload Photo |
| New Barony Meal Mill Boardhouse | | | | 59°07′39″N 3°18′11″W | Category B | 6177 | Upload another image |
| Sabiston Meal Mill, Sabiston | | | | 59°04′37″N 3°15′01″W | Category B | 6181 | Upload Photo |
| Midhouse Of Corrigall Harray | | | | 59°03′20″N 3°10′46″W | Category B | 6186 | Upload Photo |
| Twatt Airfield (Former Hms Tern), Pillboxes | | | | 59°04′58″N 3°17′07″W | Category C(S) | 51782 | Upload Photo |
| Old Barony Meal Mill Boardhouse | | | | 59°07′39″N 3°18′13″W | Category C(S) | 6176 | Upload another image |
| The Click Mill Millbrig Hillside | | | | 59°05′14″N 3°10′44″W | Category B | 6180 | Upload Photo |
| Holodyke | | | | 59°03′48″N 3°12′28″W | Category B | 6706 | Upload Photo |
| St Peters Monastery Brough Of Birsay | | | | 59°08′12″N 3°19′49″W | Category B | 6183 | Upload Photo |
| Harray Kirk (St. Michael's) | | | | 59°02′33″N 3°11′53″W | Category B | 6184 | Upload Photo |
| Mill Of Harray Conyar Harray | | | | 59°02′57″N 3°13′31″W | Category B | 6185 | Upload Photo |
| St Magnus Church, Birsay | | | | 59°07′46″N 3°18′59″W | Category B | 6171 | Upload another image |
| Boardhouse Threshing Mill And Steadings, Boardhouse | | | | 59°07′39″N 3°18′13″W | Category C(S) | 6175 | Upload Photo |
| Birsay Bridge | | | | 59°07′43″N 3°18′56″W | Category C(S) | 6173 | Upload Photo |
| Old Bea Farmhouse | | | | 59°08′17″N 3°15′37″W | Category C(S) | 6178 | Upload Photo |
| Kirbister Farmhouse | | | | 59°06′35″N 3°15′15″W | Category B | 6179 | Upload Photo |
| The Kitchener Memorial | | | | 59°06′23″N 3°21′08″W | Category C(S) | 6182 | Upload another image |
| Twatt Airfield (Former HMS Tern), Combined Control Tower And Operations Block | | | | 59°05′13″N 3°17′21″W | Category B | 51783 | Upload another image |

== Key ==
The scheme for classifying buildings in Scotland is:

- Category A: "buildings of national or international importance, either architectural or historic; or fine, little-altered examples of some particular period, style or building type."
- Category B: "buildings of regional or more than local importance; or major examples of some particular period, style or building type, which may have been altered."
- Category C: "buildings of local importance; lesser examples of any period, style, or building type, as originally constructed or moderately altered; and simple traditional buildings which group well with other listed buildings."

In March 2016 there were 47,288 listed buildings in Scotland. Of these, 8% were Category A, and 50% were Category B, with the remaining 42% being Category C.

== See also ==
- List of listed buildings in Orkney
