= List of listed buildings in Papa Westray, Orkney =

This is a list of listed buildings in the parish of Papa Westray in Orkney, Scotland.

== List ==
| Name | Location | Date Listed | Grid Ref. (Note: Sometimes known as OSGB36, the grid reference (where provided) is based on the British national grid reference system used by the Ordnance Survey. • "Guide to National Grid". Ordnance Survey. • "Get-a-map". Ordnance Survey.) | Geo-coordinates | Notes | LB Number (Note: Historic Environment Scotland assign a unique alphanumeric identifier to each designated site in Scotland, for listed buildings this always begins with "LB", for example "LB12345".) | Image |
|---|---|---|---|---|---|---|---|
| Holland Farm Including Micklegarth, Well, Bothy And Dairy, Smithy And Joiners' Workshop, Stallion House, Threshing Barn And Horse Mill, Kiln And West Barn, Miller's House, Bothy, Byre, Cow Byre And Stackyard | | | | 59°20′50″N 2°54′03″W | Category B | 18828 | Upload another image |
| Papa Westray War Memorial | | | | 59°20′56″N 2°54′00″W | Category C(S) | 48101 | Upload another image |
| Holland House, Including Adjoining Boundary Walls To East And South- West | | | | 59°20′50″N 2°54′00″W | Category B | 18600 | Upload Photo |
| Holland House, Pair Of Storehouses/Bothies To North -East | | | | 59°20′50″N 2°53′59″W | Category B | 48095 | Upload Photo |
| Mid House | | | | 59°21′30″N 2°53′13″W | Category C(S) | 48100 | Upload Photo |
| Kirkhouse Cottage | | | | 59°21′24″N 2°53′42″W | Category C(S) | 48098 | Upload another image |
| Holland House, Walled Garden To East | | | | 59°20′50″N 2°53′56″W | Category C(S) | 48096 | Upload Photo |
| Nouster Stores Including Pier | | | | 59°21′02″N 2°53′09″W | Category C(S) | 47378 | Upload Photo |
| St Boniface Kirk (Old Papa Westray Kirk) Including Kirkyard And Boundary Walls | | | | 59°21′27″N 2°54′07″W | Category B | 18599 | Upload another image |
| The Manse, Including Garden Walls To South And East | | | | 59°20′49″N 2°53′40″W | Category B | 48099 | Upload Photo |
| Holland Dovecot, To South West Of Holland Farm | | | | 59°20′47″N 2°54′10″W | Category B | 18601 | Upload another image |
| Holland, Windmill Stump And Store | | | | 59°20′41″N 2°53′54″W | Category C(S) | 48097 | Upload Photo |

== Key ==
The scheme for classifying buildings in Scotland is:

- Category A: "buildings of national or international importance, either architectural or historic; or fine, little-altered examples of some particular period, style or building type."
- Category B: "buildings of regional or more than local importance; or major examples of some particular period, style or building type, which may have been altered."
- Category C: "buildings of local importance; lesser examples of any period, style, or building type, as originally constructed or moderately altered; and simple traditional buildings which group well with other listed buildings."

In March 2016 there were 47,288 listed buildings in Scotland. Of these, 8% were Category A, and 50% were Category B, with the remaining 42% being Category C.

== See also ==
- List of listed buildings in Orkney
