= Holland House, Papa Westray =

Historic farm complex located on the island of Papa Westray, Orkney, Scotland

Coordinates: 59°20′50″N 2°54′02″W

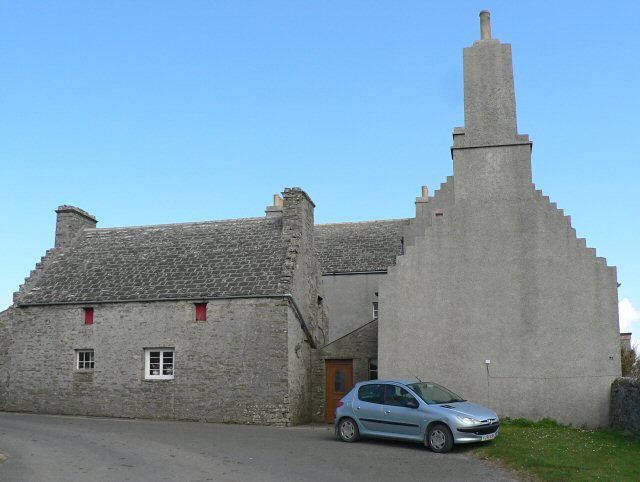
Holland House, Papa Westray

Holland Farm is a historic farm complex located on the island of Papa Westray in Orkney, Scotland. The two-storey harled flagstone house with crow-stepped gables, was built by Thomas Traill as a laird's house in the early 1800s. The farm was expanded over two hundred years, and consists of a horse engine house, threshing barn, corn-drying kiln, smithy, stackyard and a lectern-style dovecote. The present complex is a working farm and includes the Bothy Museum.

== Description ==
Holland Farm is a historic estate and farm complex located south of Mickelgarth village on the island of Papa Westray in Orkney, Scotland. The present house was built between the years 1810 to 1814 by the Traill family of Holland. The Traill family owned the island of Papa Westray from the 17th century to the end of the 19th century. The family is buried in the Traill family burial-section inside nearby St Boniface's Church.

The original two-storey house with crow-stepped gables was built as a laird's house. The house was constructed with harled flagstone rubble. Connected to the west gable is a single-storey addition to the house, joined by an extension to a low two-storey stepped gabled building. To the east of the house, a walled garden was built around 1832. To the west of the house is a barn with a large round kiln; To the southwest are the remains of a harled, roofless, lectern-styled dovecote, most likely built in the 18th century.

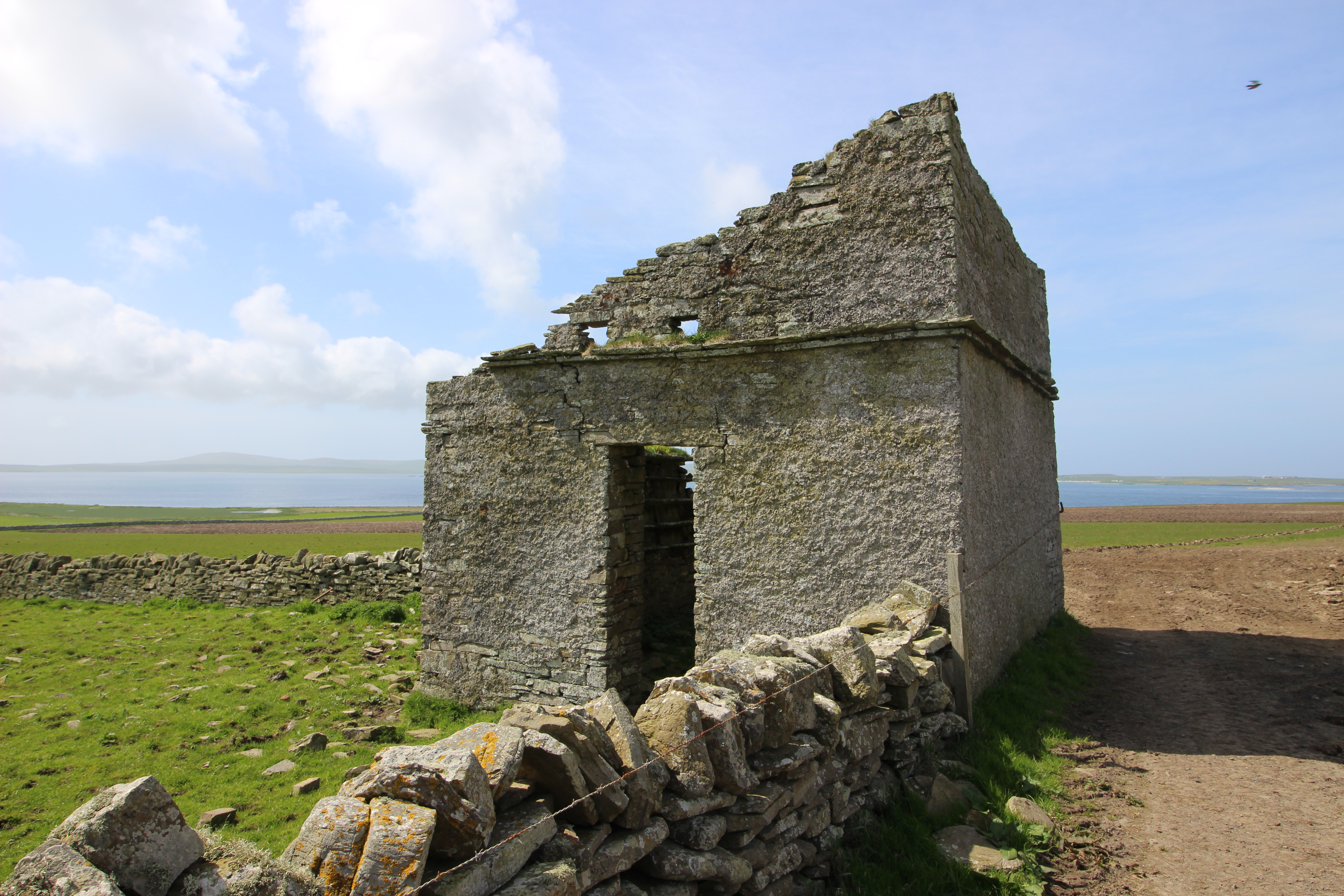
Holland Farm dovecote

The complex contains several historic farm buildings, including a horse engine house, corn-drying kiln, threshing barn, smithy, stackyard and the lectern-style dovecote. The horse engine house is circular in design and in excellent condition. Most of the side-openings of the structure are still intact and the conical, flagstone roof has been restored. The machinery and cross-beams from the building have been removed. The house was remodelled in the early 19th century and made into the estate manager's house.

With its collection of historic farm buildings, Holland House is a very important example of a historic farm complex. Holland House continues to be a working farm. The farm and Bothy museum, which displays historic artefacts used at the farm, is open daily to visitors.

== History ==
The Holland estate was purchased by Thomas Traill in 1637. He built his first house just north of the Holland House. The estate remained in the possession of the Traill family until 1952. George Traill built a larger house on the estate, from 1810 to 1814. When Trail's kelp-processing business declined in the 1830s, he expanded the farm complex. During this time period, Traill constructed a horse engine house, probably the first horse-powered threshing mill in Orkney.

== See also ==
- Knap of Howar
- Mary Anne Baikie (née Traill, 1861 – 1950), suffragist
- St Boniface's Church, Papa Westray
- List of listed buildings in Papa Westray, Orkney
