= Wae's me for Prince Chairlie =

Scottish Jacobite song

"Wae's me for Prince Chairlie" is a Scottish song whose theme is the aftermath of the Jacobite Rising of 1745. Written well after the events it commemorates, it is not a genuine Jacobite song, as is the case with many others now considered in the "classic canon of Jacobite songs," most of which were songs "composed in the late eighteenth and nineteenth centuries but were passed off as contemporary products of the Jacobite risings." The "Prince Chairlie" of the title is "Bonnie Prince Charlie," Charles Edward Stuart.

== Lyrics ==
The lyrics of Wae's me for Prince Chairlie present in Jacobite Relics are as follows:

A wee bird came to our ha' door,
He warbled sweet and clearly,
And aye the o'ercome o' his sang
Was "Wae's me for Prince Charlie!"
Oh! when I heard the bonny bonny bird,
The tears came dropping rarely,
I took my bannet aff my head,
For weel I lo'ed Prince Charlie.

Quo' I, "My bird, my bonny bonny bird,
Is that a tale ye borrow?
Or is't some words ye've learnt by rote,
Or a lilt o' dool and sorrow?"
"Oh! no, no, no!" the wee bird sang',
"I've flown sin' morning early;
But sic a day o' wind and rain!
Oh! wae's me for Prince Charlie!"

"On hills that are by right his ain,
He roams a lonely stranger;
On ilka hand he's press'd by want,
On ilka side by danger.
Yestreen I met him in a glen,
My heart near bursted fairly,
For sadly chang'd indeed was he,
Oh! wae's me for Prince Charlie!"

"Dark night came on, the tempest howl'd
Out-owre the hills and valleys;
And whare was't that your prince lay down,
Whase hame should been a palace?
He row'd him in a Highland plaid,
Which cover'd him but sparely,
And slept beneath a bush o' broom.
Oh! wae's me for Prince Charlie!"

But now the bird saw some redcoats,
And he shook his wings wi' anger:
"O this is no a land for me,
I'll tarry here nae langer."
A while he hover'd on the wing,
Ere lie departed fairly:
But weel I mind the fareweel strain;
'Twas "Wae's me for Prince Charlie!"
