= Hector Macneill =

Scottish poet (1746–1818)

- Born: 22 October 1746; Scotland
- Died: 15 March 1818 (aged 71); Edinburgh, Scotland
- Occupation: Poet
- Writing career
- Genre: Poetry

Hector Macneill (22 October 1746 – 15 March 1818) was a Scottish poet born near Roslin, Midlothian, Scotland. Macneill had been the son of a poor army captain and went to work as a clerk in 1760 at the age of fourteen. Soon, he was sent to the West Indies and served as assistant secretary from 1780 to 1786.

After he returned to Scotland, he wrote various political pamphlets, two novels, and several poems, The Harp (1789), The Carse of Forth, and Scotland's Skaith, the last against drunkenness, but is best known for his songs, such as My Love's in Germany (My Luve's in Germanie) My Boy Tammy, I lo'ed ne'er a Laddie but ane, and Come under my Plaidie.

Hector Macneill died in Edinburgh in 1818.

== Biography ==
=== Early life ===
Hector Macneill was born on 22 October 1746, in the villa of Rosebank, near Roslin. His father had obtained a company in the 42nd Regiment, with which he served in Flanders. Retiring with his wife and two children to Rosebank, a few years after the birth of his son Hector, he moved to a farm on the banks of Loch Lomond.

In his eleventh year Hector wrote a drama, after the manner of John Gay; and David Doig of the grammar-school of Stirling, advised his father to educate him for a liberal profession. But the family could not afford this.

=== West Indies ===
A rich relative, a West India trader of Bristol, paid the captain a visit; and offered to retain Macneill in his employment. After two years' preparatory education, he was sent to Bristol at age 13. He sailed to island of Saint Kitts, provided with recommendatory letters, if he preferred employment on land. With a son of the Bristol trader he remained for a year; and then sailed for Guadeloupe, where he continued in the employment of a merchant for three years, till 1763, when the island was ceded to the French.

Dismissed by his employer, Macneill made his way to Antigua; and became assistant to his relative, who had come to the town of St John's. He knew some French language; and became assistant to the Provost-Marshal of Grenada. This appointment he held for three years, when, hearing of the death of his mother and sister, he returned to Britain. On the death of his father, eighteen months after his arrival, he succeeded to a small patrimony, which he proceeded to invest in the purchase of an annuity of £80 per annum. With this limited income, he seems to have planned a permanent settlement in his native country; but the unexpected embarrassment of the party from whom he had purchased the annuity, and an attachment of an unfortunate nature, compelled him to re-embark on the ocean of adventure. He accepted the office of assistant-secretary on board Admiral Geary's flagship, and made two cruises with the grand fleet. Proposing again to return to Scotland, he afterwards resigned his appointment; but he was induced, by the remonstrances of his friends, Dr Currie, and Mr Roscoe, of Liverpool, to accept a similar situation on board the flagship of Sir Richard Bickerton, who had been appointed to take the chief command of the naval power in India. In this post, many of the hardships incident to a seafaring life fell to his share; and being present at the last indecisive action with "Suffrein," he had likewise to encounter the perils of war. His present connexion subsisted three years; but Macneill sickened in the discharge of duties wholly unsuitable for him, and longed for the comforts of home. His resources were still limited, but he flattered himself in the expectation that he might earn a subsistence as a man of letters. He fixed his residence at a farm-house in the vicinity of Stirling; and, amidst the pursuits of literature, the composition of verses, and the cultivation of friendship, he contrived, for a time, to enjoy a considerable share of happiness. But he speedily discovered the delusion of supposing that an individual, entirely unknown in the literary world, could at once be able to establish his reputation, and inspire confidence in the bookselling trade, whose favour is so essential to men of letters. Discouraged in longer persevering in the attempt of procuring a livelihood at home, Macneill, for the fourth time, took his departure from Britain. Provided with letters of introduction to influential and wealthy persons in Jamaica, he sailed for that island on a voyage of adventure; being now in his thirty-eighth year, and nearly as unprovided for as when he had first left his native shores, twenty-four years before. On his arrival at Kingston, he was employed by the collector of customs, whose acquaintance he had formed on the voyage; but this official soon found he could dispense with his services, which he did, without aiding him in obtaining another situation. The individuals to whom he had brought letters were unable or unwilling to render him assistance, and the unfortunate adventurer was constrained, in his emergency, to accept the kind invitation of a medical friend, to make his quarters with him till some satisfactory employment might occur. He now discovered two intimate companions of his boyhood settled in the island, in very prosperous circumstances, and from these he received both pecuniary aid and the promise of future support. Through their friendly offices, his two sons, who had been sent out by a generous friend, were placed in situations of respectability and emolument. But the thoughts of the poet himself were directed towards Britain. He sailed from Jamaica, with a thousand plans and schemes hovering in his mind, equally vague and indefinite as had been his aims and designs during the past chapter of his history. A small sum given him as the pay of an inland ensigncy, now conferred on him, but antedated, sufficed to defray the expenses of the voyage.

=== Jamaica ===
Before leaving Scotland for Jamaica, Macneill had commenced a poem, founded on a Highland tradition; and to the completion of this production he assiduously devoted himself during his homeward voyage. It was published at Edinburgh in 1789, under the title of "The Harp, a Legendary Tale." In the previous year, he published a pamphlet in vindication of slavery, entitled, "On the Treatment of the Negroes in Jamaica." This pamphlet, written to gratify the wishes of an interested friend, rather than as the result of his own convictions, he subsequently endeavoured to suppress. For several years, Macneill persevered in his unsettled mode of life. On his return from Jamaica, he resided in the mansion of his friend, Mr Graham of Gartmore, himself a writer of verses, as well as a patron of letters; but a difference with the family caused him to quit this hospitable residence. After passing some time with his relatives in Argyllshire, he entertained a proposal of establishing himself in Glasgow, as partner of a mercantile house, but this was terminated by the dissolution of the firm; and a second attempt to succeed in the republic of letters had an equally unsuccessful issue. In Edinburgh, whither he had removed, he was seized with a severe nervous illness, which, during the six following years, rendered him incapable of sustained physical exertion. With a little money, which he contrived to raise on his annuity, he retired to a small cottage at St Ninians; but his finances again becoming reduced, he accepted of the hospitable invitation of his friends, Major Spark and his lady, to become the inmate of their residence of Viewforth House, Stirling. At this period, Macneill composed the greater number of his best songs, and produced his poem of "Scotland's Skaith, or the History of Will and Jean," which was published in 1795, and speedily gained him a wide reputation. Before the close of twelvemonths, it passed through no fewer than fourteen editions. A sequel, entitled "The Waes o' War," which appeared in 1796, attained nearly an equal popularity. The original ballad was composed during the author's solitary walks along the promenades of the King's Park, Stirling, while he was still suffering mental depression. It was completed in his own mind before any of the stanzas were committed to paper.

The hope of benefiting his enfeebled constitution in a warm climate induced him to revisit Jamaica. As a parting tribute to his friends at Stirling, he published, in 1799, immediately before his departure, a descriptive poem, entitled "The Links of Forth, or a Parting Peep at the Carse of Stirling," which, regarded as the last effort of a dying poet, obtained a reception fully equal to its merits.

On the oft-disappointed and long unfortunate poet the sun of prosperity at length arose. On his arrival in Jamaica, one of his early friends, Mr John Graham, of Three-Mile-River, settled on him an annuity of £100 a-year; and, in a few months afterwards, they sailed together for Britain, the poet's health being essentially improved. Macneill now fixed his permanent residence in Edinburgh, and, with the proceeds of several legacies bequeathed to him, together with his annuity, was enabled to live in comparative affluence. The narrative of his early adventures and hardships is supposed to form the basis of a novel, entitled "The Memoirs of Charles Macpherson, Esq.," which proceeded from his pen in 1800. In the following year, he published a complete edition of his poetical works, in two duodecimo volumes. In 1809, he published "The Pastoral, or Lyric Muse of Scotland," in a thin quarto volume; and about the same time, anonymously, two other works in verse, entitled "Town Fashions, or Modern Manners Delineated," and "Bygone Times and Late-come Changes." His last work, "The Scottish Adventurers," a novel, appeared in 1812, in two octavo volumes.

=== Later works ===
Macneill wrote songs, "Mary of Castlecary," "My boy, Tammie," "Come under my plaidie," "I lo'ed ne'er a laddie but ane," "Donald and Flora," and "Dinna think, bonnie lassie," that were popular. The ballad of "Scotland's Skaith" aimed at realism on rural life, and a temperance message.

=== Later life and death ===
During his latter years, Macneill was known in fashionable company in Edinburgh, as a conversationalist. He died on 15 March 1818, at age 71.
