= The Trials of Cato =

English and Welsh folk band

- Origin: Beirut, Lebanon
- Genres: Folk
- Instruments: Vocals, acoustic guitar, mandolin, irish bouzouki, tenor banjo, clawhammer banjo
- Years active: 2017–present
- Labels: Wipe Out Music; Water Records
- Members: Tomos Williams; Robin Jones; Polly Bolton
- Past members: Will Addison
- Website: www.thetrialsofcato.com

The Trials of Cato are a Welsh/English folk band that originally consisted of Tomos Williams, Will Addison and Robin Jones. Their 2018 debut album Hide and Hair won Best Album in the BBC Radio 2 Folk Awards in 2019. In 2020, Will Addison left the group, and was replaced by Polly Bolton, a mandolin player and vocalist known for her work with The Magpies and Stillhouse.

The original trio formed the band in Beirut while working there as English teachers after graduating university. After moving to Beirut, the band stayed with a friend named Cato, who was bothered by the incessant noise of the band practising, hence the name 'The Trials of Cato'.

Their second album titled Gog Magog, after the giant of Arthurian legend and the Cambridgeshire hilltop, was released on 25 November 2022.

== History ==
=== Early years ===
Tomos Williams and Robin Jones were born in 1992 and 1991 respectively. They both grew up in Ponciau in the community of Rhosllannerchrugog, Wrexham and attended Ysgol Morgan Llwyd, the only Welsh language school in the Wrexham area. This is where they met and started playing music together in their early teens. Both are fluent Welsh speakers and were educated in Welsh.

They played together in various rock, metal and folk bands through their teens, including a Welsh-language Beatles cover band called Y Chwilod, which was led by their chemistry teacher Christopher Robert Evans. It was during this period that they played their first gig at the now-closed Wrexham venue The Fat Cat. Both were influenced by the bands that passed through their local rock venue, Central Station, and were also enamoured with various artists on the Welsh language folk scene, including Gwibdaith Hen Fran, Mim Twm Llai, Gwyneth Glyn and Twm Morys.

At around age 17, they started to deepen their interest in folk music, with Robin writing an early version of the song Haf (Welsh for ‘summer’) during this time. The song went on to appear on the band’s 2018 debut. It was also during this period that they discovered the music of various classic folk acts such as Planxty, Andy Irvine, Paul Brady, Dick Gaughan, Silly Wizard, Fairport Convention and Steeleye Span. They became regular attendees at a well-established folk club called The Raven in Chester.

At age 18, Robin began a degree in Anglo-Saxon, Norse and Celtic at Trinity Hall, Cambridge, where he met Will Addison, who was studying the same degree, and was one of the three original members of The Trials of Cato. Will and Robin became friends, and started playing music together. In their third year at Cambridge, they began playing with violin player David Bailey, with whom they formed their first band ‘Mo’s Gold Teeth’. The name was in honour of one of their best friends at university, Mo Nagdy, who had two bright gold teeth in the rear of his mouth which would only be revealed when he smiled. They played their first gigs in pubs and small venues around Cambridge, once supporting their hero Andy Irvine at Baldock and Letchworth Folk Club. Several songs from The Trials of Cato became parts of the band’s repertoire during this period, including Tom Paine’s Bones, My Love’s in Germany, and some of their instrumental sets.

Tomos attended Cardiff University, originally to study ancient history but later switching to modern history, before moving to The Netherlands to undertake a Masters at Leiden University. In 2014, having both graduated, Tomos and Robin moved to Beirut in order to learn Arabic and support themselves by working as English teachers. In 2015, Will joined them in Beirut. The three 23 year-olds taught English by day and played music together by night on bouzouki, mandolin and guitar. They lived with an older Norwegian former-soldier named Cato, who had fought in Afghanistan. The band had great admiration for Cato, and initially began performing under the name ‘Cato’ in his honour. They performed at various venues in and around Beirut, such as The Back Door, Radio Beirut and Colonel Brewery Festival.

During their time in Beirut they collaborated with several Lebanese and Syrian musicians. Not all of these collaborators were in the band at the same time, but the group fluctuated from a trio up to seven people in various guises and at various times. During this period, the band absorbed middle-eastern influences that can still be heard in their music.

=== The Trials of Cato EP ===
In 2016, the band were invited to record an EP at Abbey Road Institute by a contact whom Tomos had met in Leiden. At this point, they decided to quit their jobs as English teachers and throw everything at their musical project. It was also during this time that they renamed themselves from ‘Cato’ to ‘The Trials of Cato’ - a reflection of the fact that the band was now practising more obsessively and more loudly than ever. Although Cato was a staunch supporter of the band, it was felt that the incessant noise was causing him some irritation. The songs on this EP (simply titled ‘The Trials of Cato’) were written over a fortnight as the band prepared to leave Beirut and travel to Abbey Road in London for the recording. The EP is no longer in print and remains a relatively highly sought-after item by collectors.

Upon the band’s return to the UK they pooled together their savings from working in Beirut to purchase two Roland busking amps and an old Ford Transit van. They drove to Abbey Road studios and recorded The Trials of Cato EP over three days. The EP featured double bass from London-based musician Joe Scott and fiddle from Rita Issa.

After recording the EP, the band drove to Berlin over a couple of months, stopping to busk along the way. They returned to the UK in December 2016 once the EP had been produced and pressed. Then, starting in Yorkshire, they began a campaign of visiting various folk clubs around the UK, and performing at open-mic nights. As they had no permanent residence at this time, the band would usually turn up in their van, play the show and sleep on site before moving on to the next club the following day. Some of the first clubs they played in included Skipton Folk Club, Otley Folk Club, and The Black Swan Folk Club in York, where they met the person that inspired their song ‘Gloria’, which was written over Christmas 2016. Their early folk club appearances were generally unpaid and they survived by busking. During this time they usually slept in their van and, perhaps seeming suspicious, were notably raided by police on one occasion. Nonetheless, the band had begun to make a name for themselves, and slowly started to get more paid performances and festival bookings. They played their first ticketed concert at The Raven Folk Club in December 2016.

=== Hide and Hair ===
During 2017, the band continued a mix of busking and playing folk clubs around the UK whilst also writing their debut album, Hide and Hair. Hide and Hair was recorded by Rob Callan at Pen-y-lan studios in Wales in April 2018. It was mixed by Donald Richard, and mastered by John Davis, who initially called them ‘The Sex Pistols of Folk’, a title that has since been used to describe them publicly on several occasions. The album was released on 9 November 2018. Shortly afterwards, the band was nominated for the best emerging artist by the Welsh Folk Awards, and the album won Best Album at the BBC Radio 2 Folk Awards. Difyrrwch, the opening track of the album, was later featured on the popular Netflix documentary series Welcome to Wrexham.

In 2019, the band began a tour of America, having begun a relationship with US-based booking agent Sean Boyd. They performed gigs in the New England area in Oct 2019, and did a short tour of Canada in January 2020.

=== Will Addison’s departure and Polly Bolton’s joining ===
The band halted performance activities in March 2020 due to the COVID-19 pandemic. In June, Will Addison left the band, with the goal of pursuing a bicycle tour to Singapore.

The band had initially met Polly Bolton at Warwick folk festival in 2018, and co-headlined with her erstwhile band The Magpies at Great Yorkshire Fringe. The band admired her mandolin playing, as well as her creativity in writing for The Magpies and for her solo arrangements. They asked her to join the band, and she agreed, officially joining in October 2020.

=== Gog Magog ===
Throughout the winter of 2020 and up until June 2021, the band were not able to perform live due to the pandemic, and so had ample time to bring their ideas together to write and arrange their second album, Gog Magog.

In June 2021, they went out on tour, performing songs both from Hide and Hair, and from the as-yet unreleased Gog Magog.

In early 2022 they played at Celtic Connections as the support group for Sharon Shannon.

In February 2022, the band flew out to Kerhonkson, New York, where their booking agent for the USA, Sean Boyd, had a recording studio. They spent two weeks there, for much of the time snowed-in, and recorded Gog Magog.

The album was mixed by Donald Richard and Jake Charron, who worked together at Space Camp Productions, the latter also being a guitarist who plays in The East Pointers. The pair also added additional production elements to the record. It was again mastered by John Davis.

Gog Magog was released in the UK on 25 November 2022, and in the US on 24th February 2023. It has received much praise and critical acclaim.

== Discography ==
Albums

- Hide and Hair (2018)
- Gog Magog (2022)

Singles

- Gloria (2018)
- Bedlam Boys (2021)
- Ring of Roses (2022)

EPs

- The Trials of Cato EP (2017)
