= MV Golden Mariana =

British passenger ferry

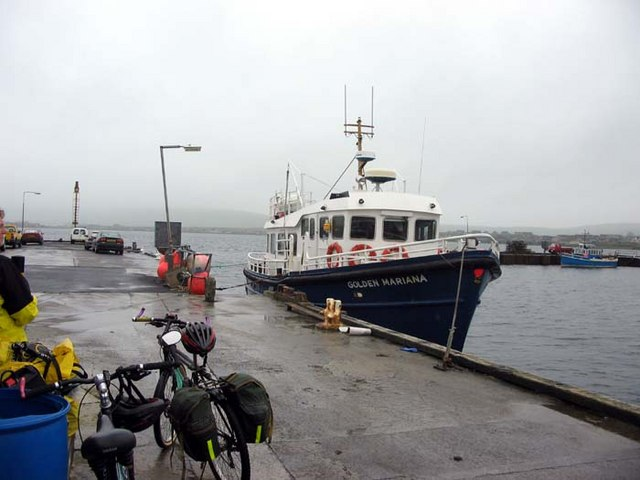
- MV Golden Mariana in Westray.

History

United Kingdom
- Name: MV Golden Mariana
- Owner: Northerly Marine Services
- Port of registry: Kirkwall
- Builder: Bideford Shipyard, Bideford
- Completed: 1973
- Identification: MMSI number: 235021681; Callsign: MHPZ1

General characteristics
- Class & type: MCA Class VIA/VI
- Type: Passenger Ferry
- Tonnage: 32.88
- Length: 50 ft (15.2 m)
- Beam: 16 ft (4.9 m)
- Draft: 5.5 ft (1.7 m)
- Installed power: 1 x 97kW Gardner 6LXB
- Speed: 8.5 knots (15.7 km/h; 9.8 mph)
- Capacity: 38 passengers

MV Golden Mariana is a passenger ferry operated by Orkney Ferries.

== History ==
MV Golden Mariana was built in 1973 by Bideford Shipyard in Bideford, UK. She was designed by John England of Padstow, Cornwall. The designer and builder of the Padstow speedboats. She was originally a pleasure boat which took passengers on short cruises around the Camel estuary and surrounding coastline during the summer. She was designed to be a dual purpose vessel that could easily convert to a fishing trawler for the winter when tourists were few and far between. She was launched by David England in 1973. He was six years old at the time and still wearing pyjamas on the day he was released from hospital after having his tonsils removed. She had a proper launch, smashing a bottle of champagne across her bow as she was blessed.

== Service ==
MV Golden Mariana was normally allocated to the Westray to Papa Westray service but also relieved on the Stromness to Graemsay & North Hoy service during the annual refit periods of the regular vessel MV Graemsay.

Golden Mariana was withdrawn from Orkney Ferries operation in October 2023 and put up for sale where she was subsequently bought by Orkney-based vessel charter firm Northerly Marine Services in early 2024.
