= Earl Sigurd =

Earl Sigurd may refer to

- Sigurd Hlodvirsson, Earl of Orkney (circa 991–1014)
- Sigurd Haakonsson (circa 895–962), Earl of Lade
- MV Earl Sigurd, a ferry in the Orkney Ferries fleet
