= RV Clione =

UK ship built in 1961

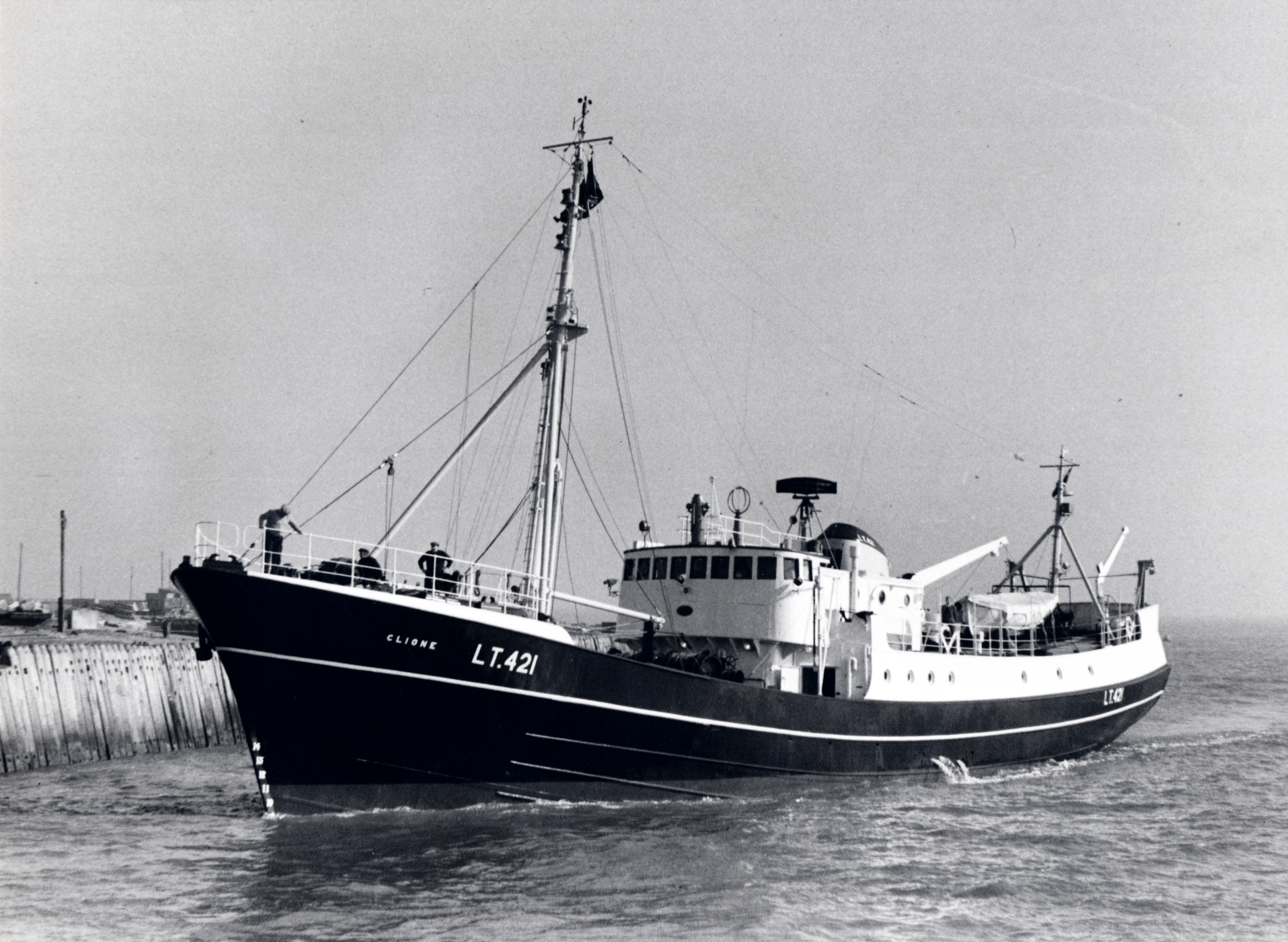
- RV Clione

History

United Kingdom
- Name: RV Clione (LT421); MV Putford Petrel; MY Lynn G
- Owner: Ministry of Agriculture, Fisheries and Food (United Kingdom); Putford Enterprises; Dutch Film Unit
- Builder: Cochrane Shipbuilders, Selby
- Yard number: 1458
- Launched: 22 August 1960
- In service: 1961-1988
- Renamed: 3 May 1991
- Home port: Lowestoft
- Identification: IMO number: 5076119

General characteristics
- Type: Research Vessel; Oil rig stand-by ship; Motor yacht
- Tonnage: 482 t (474 long tons)
- Displacement: 215 t (212 long tons)
- Length: 42.56 m (139 ft 8 in)
- Beam: 8.97 m (29 ft 5 in)
- Propulsion: Two 4RPHZ auxiliaries driving Laurence Scott & Electromotors 102kW, 240 volt DC, generators at 1,200 rpm

RV Clione (LT421) was a fisheries research vessel that was operated by the Ministry of Agriculture, Fisheries and Food (United Kingdom) - Directorate of Fisheries, now known as the Centre for Environment, Fisheries and Aquaculture Science (Cefas) between 1961 and 1988.

She was constructed by Cochrane Shipbuilders Ltd., of Selby (Yorkshire) in 1961 and operated out of the port of Lowestoft.

In early 1988 the RV Clione was sold to Putford Enterprises of Great Yarmouth, and converted into an offshore oil rig stand-by ship. However, she was re-hired by the Ministry of Agriculture, Fisheries and Food (United Kingdom) in December when the Ministry's new survey vessel RV Corystes was taken out of service at short notice, requiring a change of propeller.

The RV Clione was renamed as the MV Putford Petrel on 3 May 1991. In 2000 the MV Putford Petrel was sold again and converted to a motor yacht. She was renamed as the Lynn G and is currently listed as being owned by the Dutch Film Unit – Lettele, Netherlands, although her whereabouts are unknown.

== Construction ==
The RV Clione was commissioned in 1960 as a replacement for the earlier fisheries research vessel, the RV Sir Lancelot. She was built by Cochrane Shipbuilders Ltd. of Selby (yard number 1458) in Yorkshire. She was launched on 22 August 1960 and sea trials began on 15 March 1961. She was registered in Lowestoft on 20 March 1961 – (as LT 421).

The May 1961 issue of The Motor Ship, included an article describing a novel rudder design employed on the RV Clione. It suggests that the new UK fishery research ship, the Clione, had been fitted with a Pleuger active rudder for increased maneuverability and position-keeping. The German-built rudder was fitted in the conventional position, aft of the vessel's FP propeller, and built into the blade was a 100 hp AC squirrel-cage electric motor driving a small propeller. This was said to be capable of moving the ship at 5 knots on its own, but was primarily used for low-speed maneuvering.

== Service as a fisheries research vessel ==
The RV Clione (LT421) was in service with Directorate of Fisheries from 1961 until 1988, during which time she participated in 486 separate research campaigns.

In 1961–2, Ray Beverton took up the investigation of plaice, and together with Derek Tungate developed a high speed plankton sampler, nicknamed the ‘tin tow’ net. It was used from a re-arranged after deck on the RV Clione to carry out a series of surveys of plaice and herring eggs and larvae in the southern bight of the North Sea.

June 1963 saw an attempt to see if it would be possible to establish a British tuna fishery, when the RV Clione (cruise CLI/11/1963) made an exploratory cruise off the coasts of Portugal and Mediterranean Morocco. This was followed up in June 1965 (cruise CLI/8/1965) when the RV Clione made a voyage to the waters around the Canary Islands, but like the earlier one it proved abortive.

At the end of the 1960s, the activities of beam-trawlers in the North Sea brought complaints from other fishermen that beam-trawls were adversely affecting stocks and the benthic food of fish. It therefore became necessary to study the effects of trawling on the sea bed. At first scuba divers and underwater cameras were deployed from the RV Clione, but eventually an ARL Scanner was fitted to RV Clione as a result of collaboration with Admiralty scientists at the Admiralty Research Laboratory, Teddington. This equipment had been developed during wartime for mine-hunting purposes. It ‘illuminated’ a sector of the sea-bed with sound and so indicated its configuration. It enabled fishing gear and fish to be ‘viewed’ in three dimensions from the research vessel for the first time.

Throughout its years of service the RV Clione was employed on the large-scale tagging and transplantation of plaice from one sandbank to ‘foreign grounds’ in the North Sea. In 1964 (cruise CLI/2/1964) 13,000 plaice from the three principle spawning grounds were tagged and released, both locally on their ‘home grounds’ but also further afield to look at differential growth rates and migration patterns.

The RV Clione was deployed on a number of surveys looking at sandeel populations in the North Sea. In July 1975 she was engaged in a spawning ground survey (cruise CLI/11B/1975) using the unmanned ANGUS submersible developed by Heriot-Watt University, off the Northeast coast of England.

On 27 July 1984 the Lowestoft Journal featured an article under the title "request for new research vessel to replace aging `Clione’". This was followed on 30 January 1987 with an "advert for sale by open tender of research vessel `Clione`, LT 421". Finally, on 6 February 1987 the Lowestoft Journal featured an article under the title – "26-year-old research vessel `Clione` up for sale as new replacement `Corystes` in last stages of sea trials". In early 1988 the RV Clione was sold to Putford Enterprises of Great Yarmouth.

The RV Clione was re-hired by the Ministry of Agriculture, Fisheries and Food (United Kingdom) in December 1988 to carry out surveys at the Hastings Shingle Bank, sewage sludge dump sites off Plymouth and aggregate extraction sites off the Isle of Wight, using side scan sonar, epibenthic dredges and underwater photography. This was necessary when the Ministry's existing survey vessel RV Corystes was taken out of service at short notice, requiring a change of propeller.

== See also ==
- Centre for Environment, Fisheries and Aquaculture Science
- Cochrane Shipbuilders
