= Orkney Ferries =

Scottish ferry company

Orkney Ferries Ltd
- Type: Public (Council-owned)
- Industry: Transport
- Founded: 1960
- Headquarters: Kirkwall, Scotland
- Number of locations: 21 ports
- Area served: inter-island Orkney
- Services: Ferries
- Owner: Orkney Islands Council
- Website: http://www.orkneyferries.co.uk/

Orkney Ferries is a Scottish company operating inter-island ferry services in the Orkney Islands. The company operates ferry services across 15 islands.

== History ==
The company is owned by the Orkney Islands Council and was established in 1960 as the Orkney Islands Shipping Company.

In 1991, the Orkney Islands Shipping Company acquired a private sector ferry company also called Orkney Ferries, which had been established to compete on the short sea crossing from the Scottish mainland to the Orkney Islands, but which had not succeeded in establishing the route. This company's ferry was assimilated into the inter-island fleet, and in 1995 the Orkney Islands Shipping Company adopted the name Orkney Ferries. Despite this acquisition and change of name, the current Orkney Ferries does not operate services to and from the Scottish mainland, leaving this to other operators such as NorthLink Ferries and Pentland Ferries, which is run by the same people who started the original Orkney Ferries.

== Services ==
Orkney Ferries operate between Orkney Mainland and fourteen of the smaller islands. Services include:

- The North Isles service, linking Kirkwall on Orkney Mainland to the northern isles of Eday, Sanday, Stronsay, Westray, Papay, and North Ronaldsay.
- The Shapinsay service, linking Kirkwall on Orkney Mainland to the northern island of Shapinsay.
- The Rousay, Egilsay and Wyre service, linking Tingwall on Orkney Mainland to the northern isles of Rousay, Egilsay and Wyre.
- The South Isles service, linking Houton on Orkney Mainland to the southern islands of Hoy, South Walls and Flotta.
- The Graemsay and North Hoy service, linking Stromness on Orkney Mainland to the southern islands of Hoy and Graemsay.
- The Westray to Papa Westray service, linking the islands of Westray and Papay.

== Current fleet ==
Orkney Ferries operates a fleet of inter-island vessels, most of which were specially built for service in the islands. The fleet includes:

Image	Vessel Name	Cars	Passengers	Service	Launched	Shipbuilders
	MV Eynhallow	8 (as built); 11 (from 1991)	95	Rousay, Egilsay and Wyre (1987 - )	1987	Abels Shipbuilders, Bristol
	MV Varagen	28	142	North Isles (1991 - )	1988 (acquired 1991)	Cochrane Shipbuilders, Selby
	MV Shapinsay	11	91	Shapinsay (1988 - ) Rousay, Egilsay and Wyre (relief)	1988	Yorkshire Drydock, Hull
	Earl Sigurd	25	190	North Isles (1989 - )	1989	McTay Marine, Bromborough
	Earl Thorfinn	25	190	North Isles (1989 - )	1989	McTay Marine, Bromborough
	MV Thorsvoe	16	121	South Isles (1991 - 1994); Shapinsay; Relief (1994 - )	1991	Campbeltown Shipyard, Campbeltown
	MV Hoy Head (IV)	16 (as built); 24 (from 2013)	125	South Isles (1994 - )	1994	Appledore Shipbuilders, Appledore
	MV Graemsay	1	73	Graemsay and North Hoy (1996 - )	1996	Ailsa Shipbuilding Company, Troon
	MV Nordic Sea	N/A	47	Westray - Papa Westray (2023 - 2025); Relief / Additional (2025 - )	2012 (acquired 2020)	Norway
	MV Charles Ann II	N/A	12	Westray - Papa Westray (2025 - )	2012 (acquired 2025)	
	MV Toplander	6?	12	Relief (2026 - )	2019 (acquired 2025)	Meercat Boats, Southampton
	HSC Zevi 1	N/A	12	Kirkwall - Shapinsay, Rousay, Egilsay and Wyre (2026 - )	2025	Artemis Technologies, Northern Ireland

MV Nordic Sea was acquired by Orkney Ferries in April 2020 to replace MV Golden Mariana. She was to operate on both the Westray to Papa Westray and Graemsay and North Hoy services but has been plagued by issues since arrival. The council then put out a tender for another new vessel in April 2024 due to the number of issues with Nordic Sea, this became the MV Charles Ann II.

MV Toplander was acquired by Orkney Ferries in December 2025 as an additional relief vessel to assist the fleet.

HSC Zevi 1 is a hydrofoil fast craft, which was delivered in May 2025 and after sea trials will begin service in summer 2026. It will operated with Orkney Ferries for 3 years on a trial period. Another high speed craft, for 50 passengers, is expected to be also delivered.

== Former fleet ==
Image	Vessel Name	Cars	Passengers	Service	Launched	Shipbuilders	Extra Information
	MV Golden Mariana	N/A	40	Westray - Papa Westray (1986 - 2023)	1973 (acquired in 1986)	Bideford Shipyard, Bideford	She was withdrawn from service in October 2023 and sold to Northerly Marine Services in 2024, now operating as a passenger ferry and tour boat for charter.
	MV Hoy Head (III)	10	93	South Isles (1986 - 1991) Relief (1991 - 1994)	1973	Thorshavnor Skipasmidja, Faroe Isles	Built for Shetland Island Council Ferries
	MV Islander	Cargo	12	Freight North Isles services (1969 - 1991)	1969	John Lewis & Sons Ltd, Aberdeen	
	MV Orcadia	Cargo		Passenger North Isles services (1962 - 1990)	1962	Hall, Russell & Co Ltd, Aberdeen	
	MV Hoy Head (II)		36	South Isles (1958 - 1976)	1955	George Thomson & Son, Buckie	Built as naval vessel MFV.1258
