= HMS Bradman =

Anti-submarine warfare trawler of the Royal Navy

History

United Kingdom
- Name: Bradman
- Owner: Bunch Steam Fishing Company
- Builder: Cochrane & Sons, Selby
- Launched: 31 October 1936

History

United Kingdom
- Name: HMT Bradman (FY 189)
- Namesake: Don Bradman
- Owner: Royal Navy
- Acquired: 26 August 1939
- Commissioned: October 1939
- Fate: Sunk, 25 April 1940

History

Germany
- Name: V 6112 Friese
- Owner: Kriegsmarine
- Acquired: 11 July 1940
- Fate: Sunk, 19 August 1944

General characteristics
- Tonnage: 452 GRT
- Propulsion: 1 x 3-cylinder triple expansion engine
- Speed: 11 knots

HMT Bradman (FY 189) was a 452-ton anti-submarine warfare trawler of the Royal Navy during the Second World War. She was built by Cochrane & Sons, Selby and was launched on 31 October 1936. As a fishing vessel of the Bunch Steam Fishing company she was registered at Grimsby. In the leadup to the war she was requisitioned by the Admiralty on 26 August 1939 and commissioned into the Royal Navy in October.

== Anti-submarine trawler ==
Bradman served as an anti-submarine trawler with the Royal Navy. In response to the German invasion of Norway, she was deployed to Norway as part of the 22nd Anti-Submarine Group, together with sister ships Hammond, Larwood and Jardine and the trawler Warwickshire, arriving at Molde in support of the landings at Åndalsnes on 22 April 1940. In the Norwegian campaign she was damaged by German aircraft on 25 April 1940 and run aground.

== Fate ==
Bradman was sunk by German aircraft in Romdalsfjord on 25 April 1940. She was refloated by German forces on 11 July, and returned to service as the Vorpostenboot V6112 Friese. She was torpedoed and sunk off Vardø, Finnmark, Norway by the Soviet submarine M-201 on 19 August 1944.
