= HMT Warwick Deeping =

Trawler of the British Royal Naval Patrol Service

History

United Kingdom
- Name: Warwick Deeping (FY 182)
- Namesake: Warwick Deeping
- Operator: Newington Steam Trawling Co. Ltd., Kingston upon Hull
- Builder: Cochrane & Sons Shipbuilders Ltd., Selby
- Yard number: 1130
- Launched: 11 October 1934
- Completed: December 1934
- Fate: Taken over by the Admiralty, August 1939

United Kingdom
- Name: HMT Warwick Deeping (H136)
- Acquired: August 1939
- Commissioned: 22 September 1939
- Fate: Sunk, 11 October 1940

General characteristics
- Type: Naval trawler
- Tonnage: 445 GRT
- Length: 47.24 m (155.0 ft)
- Beam: 7.92 m (26.0 ft)
- Depth: 4.27 m (14.0 ft)
- Propulsion: Triple expansion steam engine; 111 hp (83 kW)
- Complement: 22
- Armament: 1 × 4 in (100 mm) gun; 0.5-inch (12.7 mm) machine guns; Depth charges

HMT Warwick Deeping (H136) was a naval trawler of the British Royal Naval Patrol Service during World War II, sunk off the Isle of Wight in October 1940.

== Ship history ==
The Warwick Deeping was built in 1934 by Cochrane & Sons Shipbuilders of Selby for the Newington Steam Trawling Company of Kingston upon Hull as a North Sea fishing trawler.

She was acquired by the Admiralty in August 1939 and converted into an anti-submarine patrol vessel, armed with a single 4-inch (100 mm) gun, machine guns, depth charges, and fitted with ASDIC, and assigned to the 17th Anti-Submarine Group at Portsmouth.

At 22:30 on the night of 11–12 October 1940 she was on patrol in the English Channel, about 10 nautical miles (19 km; 12 mi) south of the Isle of Wight, in company with HMS Listrac (former French armed merchant ship), when she encountered five German torpedo boats; Falke, Wolfe, Greif, Kondor and Seeadler which had sailed from Cherbourg to sortie along the English coast. The two British ships soon found themselves under fire, and Listrac, believing that the German ships were Royal Navy vessels attacking in error switched on her identification lights. She was promptly shelled, causing a large explosion aboard, and then torpedoed and sunk, with the loss of her captain and 11 men. The Warwick Deeping attempted to escape, but was relentlessly attacked, and hit by a torpedo, which failed to explode. She was hit several times by shells, one of which finally disabled her engines. Now helpless and sinking, the crew abandoned the ship, but instead of delivering the coup de grace the German torpedo boats unexpectedly broke off their attack and sailed away. An hour later all 22 crew were rescued.

The Warwick Deeping lies in 35 metres (115 ft) of water at 50°34.260′N 1°27.824′W and is a popular wreck diving site.

== See also ==
- Trawlers of the Royal Navy
