= MV Hoy Head =

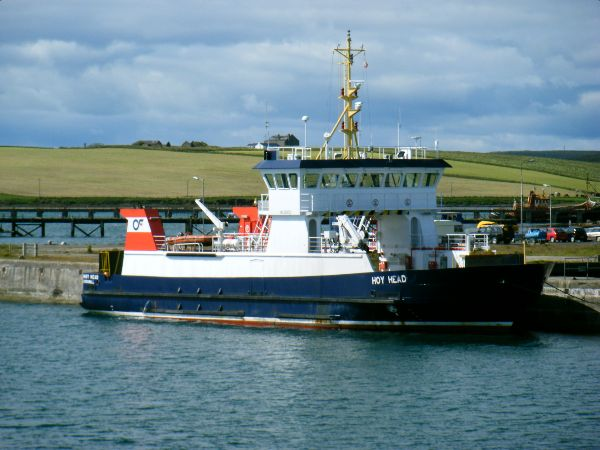
- MV Hoy Head at Lyness, Hoy.

History

United Kingdom
- Name: MV Hoy Head
- Owner: Orkney Islands Council
- Operator: Orkney Ferries
- Port of registry: Kirkwall
- Builder: Appledore Shipbuilders, Devon
- Completed: 1994
- Identification: MMSI Number: 235018919; IMO number: 9081722; Callsign: MSQD2

General characteristics
- Class & type: MCA Class IV
- Type: Ro-Ro Vehicle & Passenger Ferry
- Tonnage: 482 GT
- Length: 53.3 m (174.9 ft)
- Beam: 10 m (32.8 ft)
- Draft: 2.25 m (7.4 ft)
- Ramps: bow/stern
- Installed power: 2 Volvo D-16c (2 × 478 kW)
- Speed: 11 knots (20 km/h; 13 mph)
- Capacity: 125 passengers; 24 cars or approximately 100 tonnes
- Crew: 5

MV Hoy Head is a Ro-Ro vehicle ferry operated by Orkney Ferries.

== History ==
MV Hoy Head was built by Appledore Shipbuilders in North Devon in 1994. In 2013, the ferry entered Cammell Laird shipyard to be lengthened to increase her capacity. The work involved cutting the ferry in half and inserting a newly built section amidships, as well as a general overhaul which included upgraded passenger and crew spaces, uprated engines, replacement of the steering/propulsion units and the addition of a second bow thruster.

She is the fourth vessel of the same name. An earlier one was a former naval ferry (originally MFV 1258) operating from Houton to Lyness. She was fitted with a 150 hp Gardner engine, but now lies derelict in Irvine harbour.

Hoy Head (III) was built in the Faroe Islands in 1973 for Shetland Islands Council, operating as Geira, between Yell and Unst. She was sold to the Orkney Island Shipping Company in 1986 and superseded in 1991 by Thorsvoe, remaining as the secondary ferry to the South Isles until the introduction of Hoy Head (IV) in 1994.

Steamship Hoy Head, built by Abercorn Shipbuilding Co. of Paisley, was launched on 18 October 1883 and sank off Cornwall on 12 November 1887.

== Layout ==
Hoy Head has one passenger lounge below the vehicle deck. These have no external windows and in favourable weather passengers, particularly tourists during summer season, often use the high-level open side decks.

The vessel is fitted with two Rolls-Royce azimuth thrusters fitted during her lengthening, replacing the previously fitted Schottel units.

== Service ==
MV Hoy Head operates the South Isles Service in Orkney, between Houton and Lyness on Hoy. She also serves Flotta and South Walls.

During the summer months Hoy Head was joined by Orkney Ferries spare vessel MV Thorsvoe to supplement the increased volume in tourist traffic, however this practice was abandoned after summer 2012.
