= MV Earl Thorfinn =

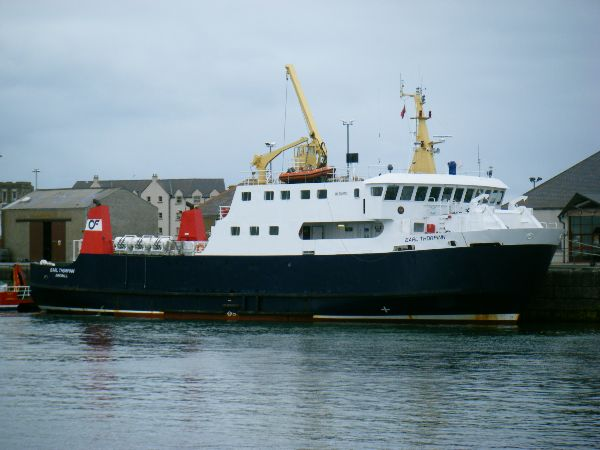
- MV Earl Thorfinn alongside at Kirkwall.

History

United Kingdom
- Name: MV Earl Thorfinn
- Owner: Orkney Islands Council
- Operator: Orkney Ferries
- Port of registry: Kirkwall
- Builder: McTay Marine, Bromborough
- Yard number: 88
- Completed: 1990
- Identification: MMSI Number: 232000760; IMO number: 8902723; Callsign: MLKP9

General characteristics
- Class & type: MCA Class IIA/III
- Type: Ro-Ro Vehicle & Passenger Ferry
- Tonnage: 771 gt
- Length: 45 m (147.6 ft)
- Beam: 11 m (36.1 ft)
- Draft: 3.155 m (10.4 ft)
- Ramps: bow/stern
- Installed power: 2 x 743kW
- Speed: 12 knots (22 km/h; 14 mph)
- Capacity: 50/95 passengers; 10 cars or approximately 40 tonnes

MV Earl Thorfinn is a Ro-Ro vehicle ferry operated by Orkney Ferries.

== History ==
MV Earl Thorfinn was built by McTay Marine in Bromborough on Merseyside in 1989.

== Service ==
MV Earl Thorfinn is normally used on Outer North Isles services, connecting Kirkwall with Eday, Sanday, Stronsay, Westray, Papay, and North Ronaldsay.
