= Cochrane Shipbuilders =

Shipbuilder at Selby

Coordinates: 53.78099°N 1.05038°W

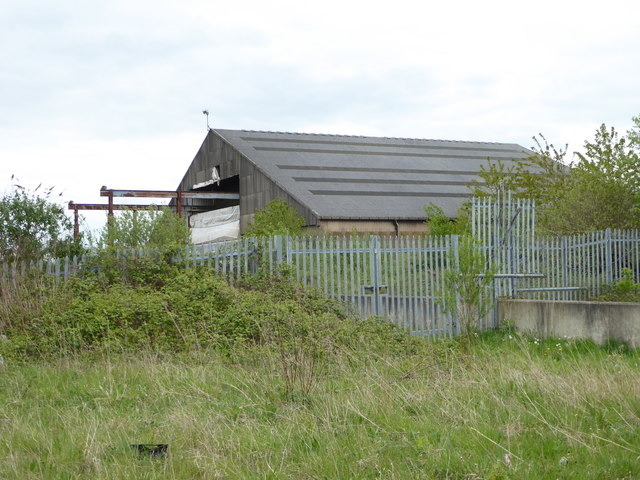
Former Cochrane's ship yard, Selby

Cochrane Shipbuilders was a shipbuilder at Selby.

Due to the narrow width of the River Ouse at Selby, Cochrane launched its ships sideways into the river.

== History ==
Founded by Andrew Cochrane at Beverley, England in 1884, establishing Cochrane & Sons in 1896. The ship building company moved to Selby in 1898. During the Second World War the company was one of the contractors engaged in building the Mulberry harbour units. The yard passed into the ownership of the Ross Group in 1965, and later to the Drypool Group in 1969. The yard was then bought by United Towing Company and in 1977 the company’s name changed to Cochrane Shipbuilders. The North British Maritime Group was taken over by the Howard Smith Group in 1987. The yard closed in October 1992 and the equipment was auctioned off in 1993.

== Ships built by Cochrane Shipbuilders ==
- Una - Hull 31 (1890)
- HMS Ormonde (1906)
- HMT Warwick Deeping (1934)
- HMS Bradman (1936)
- Arctic Viking (1937)
- HMRT Envoy (1944) (W165) was the first of the Envoy Class Rescue Tugs commissioned during the Second World to assist with D-Day landings. Launched 11 February 1944.
- HMRT Enticer (1944) (W166) 2nd Envoy Class Rescue Tug. Launched 11 March 1944.
- HMRT Enigma (1944) (W175) 3rd Envoy Class Rescue Tug. Launched 22 June 1944.
- HMRT Enforcer (1944) (W177) 4th Envoy Class Rescue Tug. Launched 22 July 1944.
- HMRT Enchanter (1944) (W178) 5th Envoy Class Rescue Tug. Launched 2 November 1944.
- HMRT Encore (1944) (W179) 6th Envoy Class Rescue Tug. Launched 2 December 1944.
- RV Ernest Holt (1948) was a fisheries research vessel that was operated by the Ministry of Agriculture, Fisheries and Food (United Kingdom) – Directorate of Fisheries, now known as the Centre for Environment, Fisheries and Aquaculture Science (Cefas).
- MV Ross Tiger & MV Ross Kashmir were both built in 1957 for Ross Trawlers. The latter later became famous as Greenpeace's flagship vessel, Rainbow Warrior II
- RV Clione – Hull 1458 (1961) was a fisheries research vessel that was operated by the Ministry of Agriculture, Fisheries and Food (United Kingdom) – Directorate of Fisheries, now known as the Centre for Environment, Fisheries and Aquaculture Science (Cefas) between 1961 and 1988.
- MV Stirling Brig – Hull 1553 (1974). 1st of the group of vessels built for Stirling Shipping Co Ltd, Glasgow, known as the BOREAS Class.
- MV Stirling Oak – Hull 1554 (1974). 2nd of BOREAS Class vessels for Stirling Shipping Co Ltd, Glasgow.
- MV Stirling Rock – Hull 1552 (1974). 3rd of BOREAS Class vessels for Stirling Shipping Co Ltd, Glasgow.
- MV Stirling Eagle – Hull 1555 (1975). 4th of BOREAS Class vessels for Stirling Shipping Co Ltd, Glasgow.
- MV Stirling Ash – Hull 1566 (1976). 5th of BOREAS Class vessels for Stirling Shipping Co Ltd, Glasgow.
- MV Stirling Sword – Hull 1567 (1976). 6th of BOREAS Class vessels for Stirling Shipping Co Ltd, Glasgow.
- HMNZS Manawanui (A09) (1979) Diving support vessel for the Royal New Zealand Navy. Originally built as a diving support vessel, the Star Perseus, for North Sea oil rig operations.
- MV Stirling Teal – Hull 119 (1982). 5th of the group of vessels built for Stirling Shipping Co Ltd, Glasgow, known as the SCOT Class. The first four SCOT Class vessels were built at Yokohama Shipyard, Japan.
- MV Stirling Snipe – Hull 120 (1982) 6th of the group of vessels built for Stirling Shipping Co Ltd, Glasgow, known as the SCOT Class. The first four SCOT Class vessels were built at Yokohama Shipyard, Japan.
- MV Hebridean Isles (1985) for Caledonian MacBrayne
- MV Star Altair – Hull 128 (1985) Later renamed Stirling Altair when Stirling Shipping Co Ltd, Glasgow acquired the fleet of Star vessels in 1995.
- MV Stirling Esk – Hull 132 (1986). Sistership of Stirling Dee, built for Stirling Shipping Co Ltd, Glasgow. Stirling Dee was built in 1985 at Teraoka Shipyard, Japan.
- MV St Cecilia – Wightlink Ferry (1987)
- MV St Faith – Wightlink Ferry (1990)
- MV Varagen (1988)

== Sources ==
- Hartcup, Guy (2011). Code Name Mulberry: The Planning Building and Operation of the Normandy Harbours. Pen & Sword Military. ISBN 978-1848845589.
