= Italian ship Leonardo =

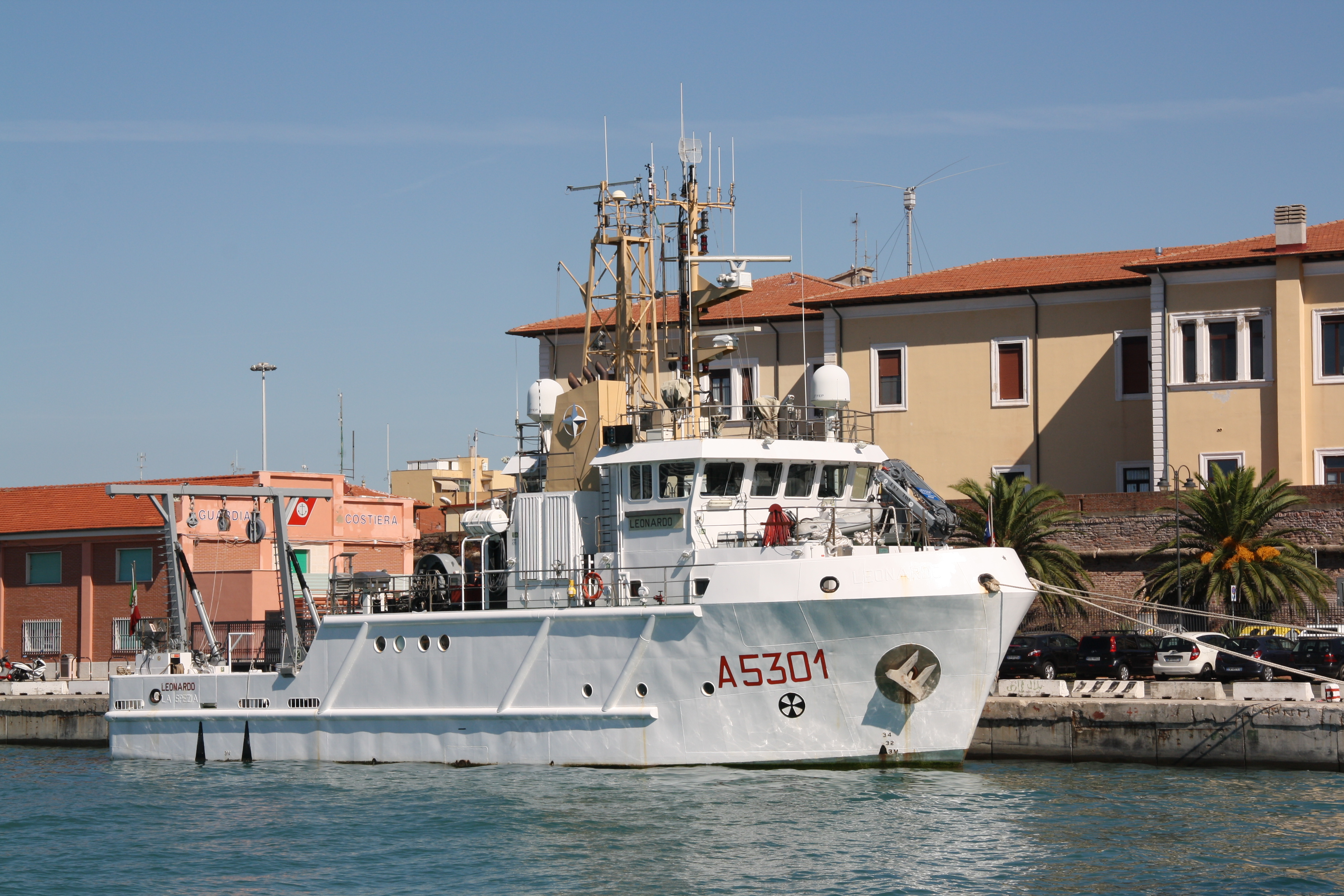
- Leonardo A 5301, 2014

History

Italy
- Name: Leonardo
- Namesake: Leonardo da Vinci
- Owner: NATO
- Ordered: 19 December 2000
- Builder: Shipyard McTay Marine Ltd - Bromborough, England
- Launched: 3 January 2002
- Commissioned: - 30 April 2002 (public vessel); - 16 November 2009 (Navy)
- Home port: La Spezia
- Identification: IMO number: 9251303; MMSI number: 247155800; Callsign: IALE; Pennant number: A 5301
- Status: Active

General characteristics
- Type: Coastal Research vessel
- Tonnage: 316 GT; 96 NT
- Displacement: 433 t (426 long tons) full load
- Length: - 28.6 m (93 ft 10 in) LOA; - 23.4 m (76 ft 9 in) LPP
- Beam: 15.2 m (49 ft 10 in) molded
- Draught: 2.76 m (9 ft 1 in) full load
- Propulsion: main electrical generators: - 1 x diesel engine generator Cummins KTA-38 6, 620 kW (830 bhp); - 2 x diesel engines generators Cummins N-14 6, 236 kW (316 bhp) each; harbor generator: - 1 x diesel engine generator Onan Cummins MCGBA, 36 kW (48 bhp); propellers: - 2 x main propellers (Azimuth) Schottel SRP330m; - 1 x Bow thruster (Azimuth) Schottel SPJ 57RD
- Speed: 10.0 knots (18.5 km/h; 11.5 mph) (sustained sea speed)
- Range: 1,850 nmi (3,430 km; 2,130 mi) at 8 knots (15 km/h; 9.2 mph)
- Endurance: port to port, 5 days
- Complement: - 14 (given its role on a day light activities, accommodations are very limited: only 6 double cabins, shared between crew and scientists), of which: - 8 crew (of which, 2 officials); - up to 6 scientists (in day running operations)
- Sensors & processing systems: - Sperry Marine dual interswitched X-band and S-band BridgeMaster E 250 radars with 18-inch high-resolution flat-panel displays; - Kongsberg fully integrated Maritime Bridge; - Kongsberg MDM 400; - echo sounder Kongsberg EA400
- Notes: - fuel capacity: 51.2 m3; - fresh water capacity: 35.8 t (35.2 long tons)

Leonardo (A 5301) is a coastal research vessel owned by NATO and operated by the Italian Navy on behalf of the Centre for Maritime Research and Experimentation Her homeport is La Spezia, Italy.

== History ==
Leonardo was delivered to the NATO Underwater Research Centre - NURC (SACLANTCEN) on 30 April 2002 and was accorded the flag of a public vessel of the Republic of Italy under a 2001 Memorandum of Understanding between the Italian Ministry of Defence (MOD-IT) and the Supreme Allied Commander Atlantic.

On 16 November 2009, CRV Leonardo was transferred to the Italian Navy. She holds the status of an auxiliary of the Italian Navy and is crewed by the military. The NATO Underwater Research Centre - NURC is now named the Centre for Maritime Research and Experimentation and is based in La Spezia, and specialises in research in acoustic and environmental fields.

== Characteristics ==
- scientific primary working area (aft): 59 m^{2} (640 sq ft)
- scientific main laboratory: 31.2 m^{2} (336 sq ft)
- capacity to carry a single ISO 1D standard, 10 ft (3.0 m), container
- multibeam echo-sounder Simrad EM-3000

Communication systems:

- Main GMDSS MF/HF transceiver Sailor HC 4500
- deck VHF transceiver Sailor RT 4722
- GMDSS SARTS transmitter Jotron 8 GHz
- Prodel UHF transmitter ICOM IC 4088SR
