= Centre for Maritime Research and Experimentation =

Centre for Maritime Research and Experimentation (CMRE)
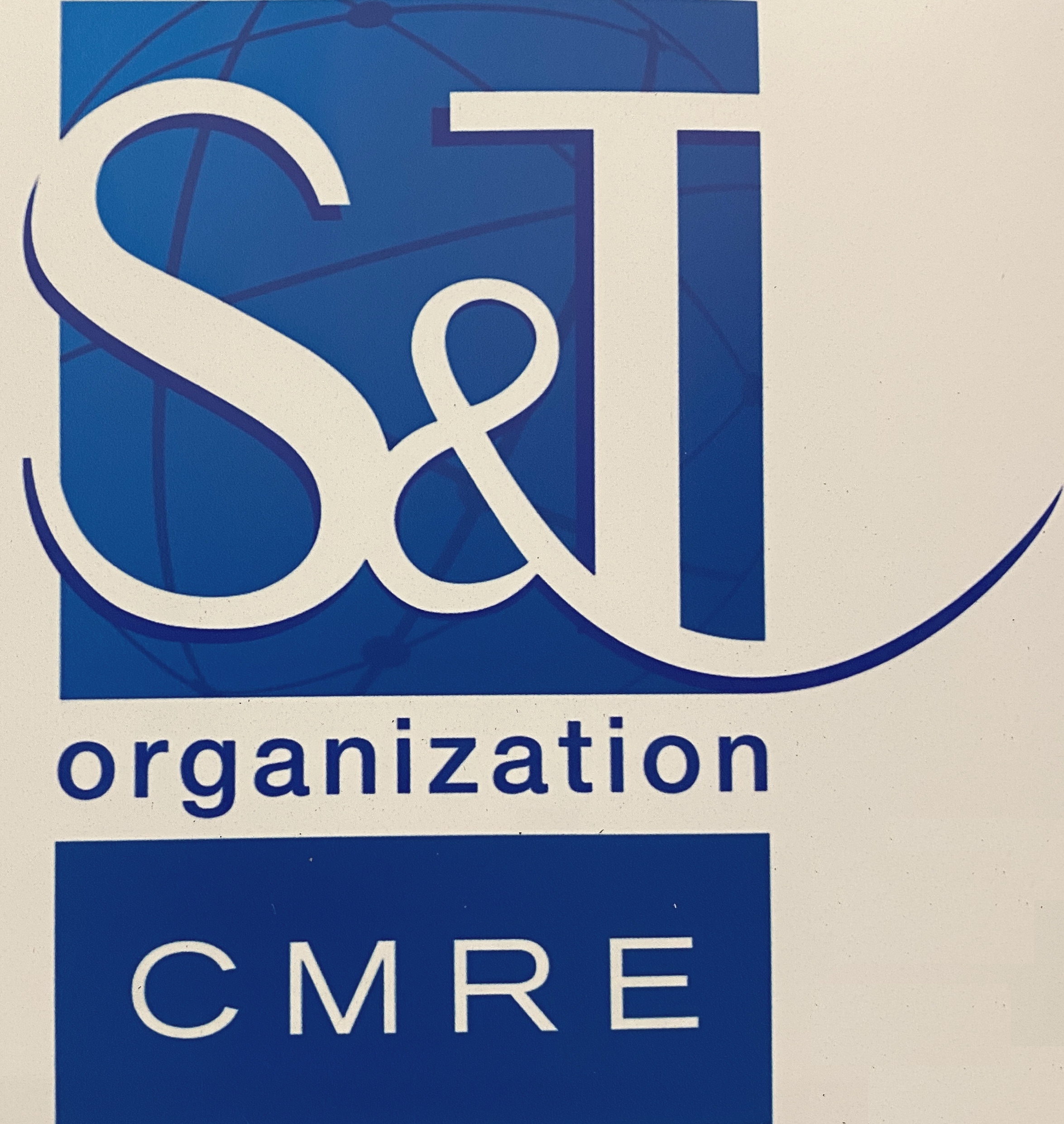
- CMRE logo
- Abbreviation: CMRE
- Formation: 1959
- Type: Military research
- Legal status: Treaty
- Purpose: Maritime security
- Headquarters: La Spezia, Italy
- Region served: 28 nations in Europe and North America
- Members: NATO
- Official language: English and French
- Director: Dr. Eric Pouliquen
- Parent organization: NATO Science and Technology Organization
- Staff: about 140
- Website: Official website

Previously known as NATO Undersea Research Centre (NURC), the Centre for Maritime Research and Experimentation (CMRE) is a scientific research and experimentation NATO facility that organises and conducts scientific research and technology development, centred on the maritime domain, to address defence and security needs of the Alliance. It is an executive body of NATO Science and Technology Organization (STO). It was established in 1959.

== Research areas ==
CMRE conducts projects in the following major research areas:

- Littoral intelligence, surveillance and reconnaissance
- Autonomous surveillance
- Port and ship protection
- Maritime situational awareness
- Robotic/Intelligent preparation of the battlespace
- Active sonar risk mitigation

== Organisation ==
CMRE employs scientists and support staff from NATO member nations. Scientists rotate through the centre on a contract basis with a fixed time limit (typically three years with a possible two-year extension).

As of December 2023, the Director is Dr. Eric Pouliquen. Dr. Pouliquen assumed duties in December 1 2023, taking over from the previous Director, Dr. Catherine Warner. After 2012, the post of Research Division Head, in charge of the scientific programme, was occupied by Dr. Sandro Carniel.

== Facilities ==
CMRE has two ships for conducting NATO research: the NATO Research Vessel (NRV) Alliance and the Coastal Research Vessel (CRV) Leonardo. The NRV Alliance is a 93-metre ship commissioned in 1988. Its double hull and propulsion system make it one of the quietest research vessels in the world. The smaller CRV Leonardo, commissioned in 2002, was designed for conducting experiments in shallower waters. In addition to supporting CMRE's scientific mission, the two vessels are chartered to commercial or government organizations within the NATO nations.

CMRE has specialised facilities and equipment for research at-sea, including a fleet of AUVs and other unmanned vehicles and instrumentation, linear array assembly facilities, and the Oceanography Calibrating Laboratory, which provides instrument calibration according to the World Ocean Circulation Experiment (WOCE) standard.

== Gallery ==
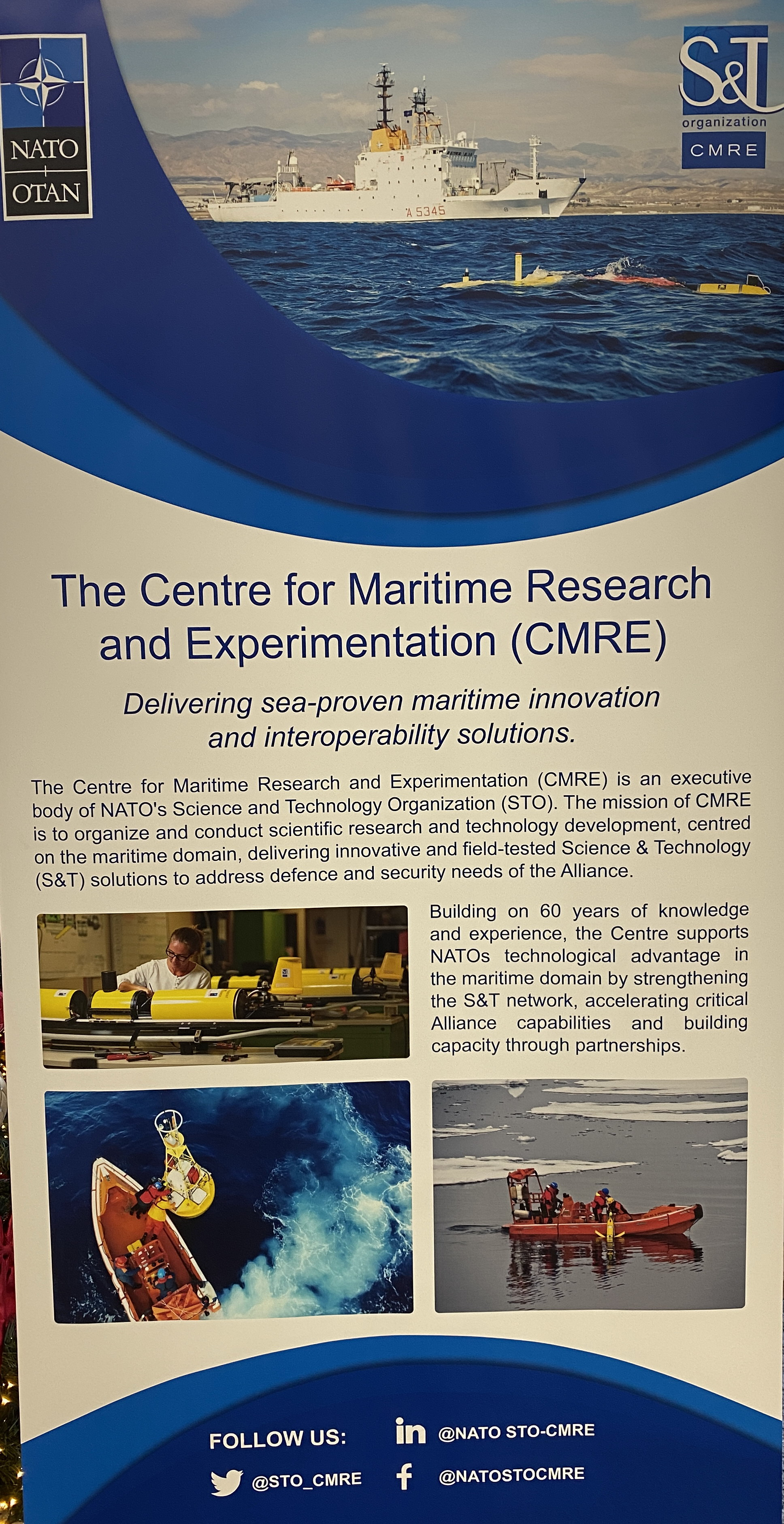

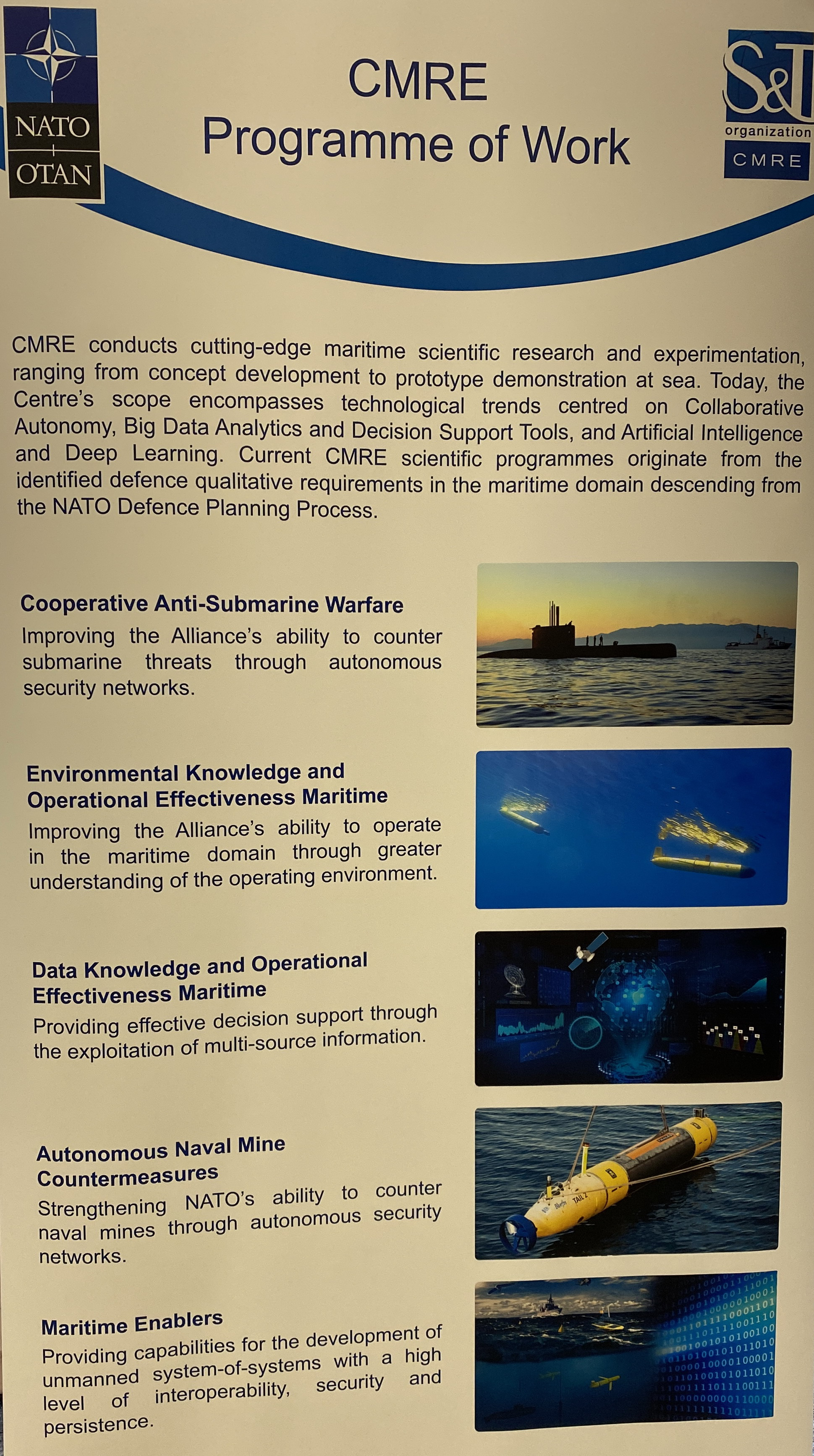

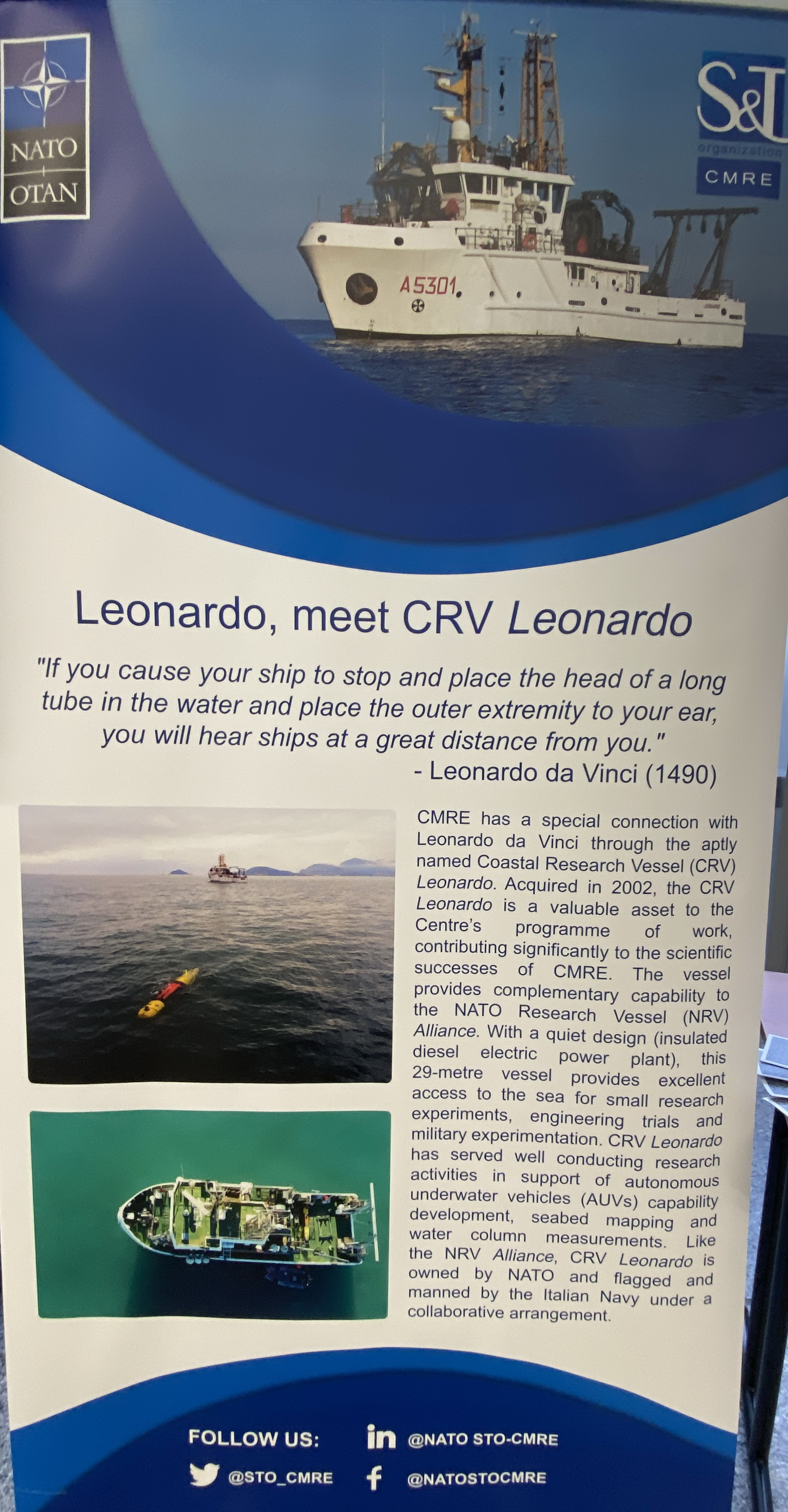
