= MV Varagen =

Orkney vehicle ferry built in 1989

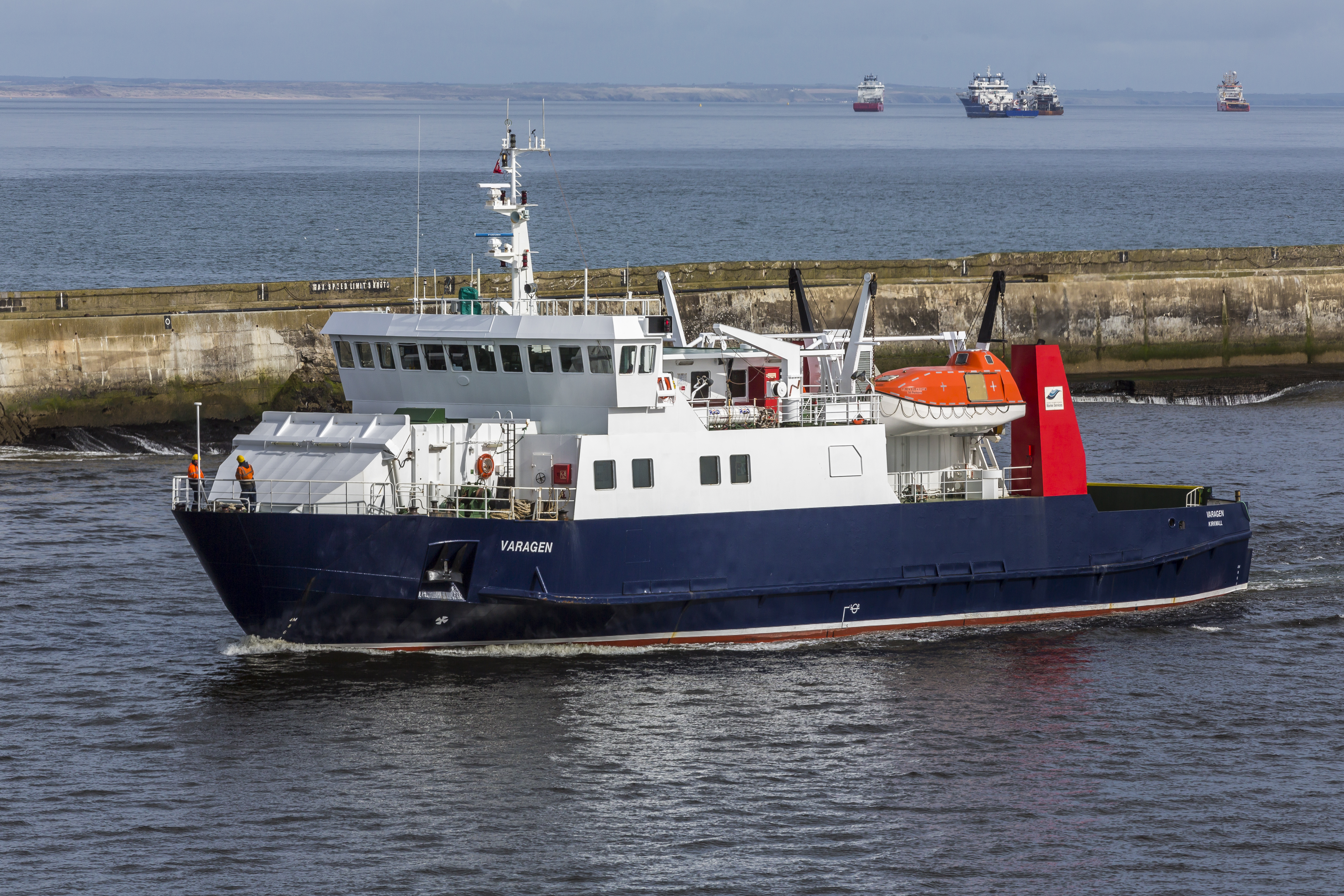
- MV Varagen underway.

History

United Kingdom
- Name: MV Varagen
- Owner: Orkney Islands Council
- Operator: Orkney Ferries
- Port of registry: Kirkwall
- Builder: Cochrane Shipbuilders, Selby
- Completed: 1989
- Identification: MMSI Number: 232000550; IMO: 8818154; Callsign: MHBN9

General characteristics
- Class & type: MCA Class IIA/III
- Type: Ro-Ro Vehicle & Passenger Ferry
- Tonnage: 928
- Length: 49.85 m (163.5 ft)
- Beam: 11.4 m (37.4 ft)
- Draft: 3.006 m (9.9 ft)
- Ramps: bow/stern
- Installed power: 2 x 790kW
- Speed: 14.5 knots (26.9 km/h; 16.7 mph)
- Capacity: 142 passengers; 28 cars or approximately 120 tonnes

MV Varagen is a Ro-Ro vehicle ferry operated by Orkney Ferries.

== History ==
MV Varagen was built by Cochrane Shipbuilders, Selby in 1989, to provide a service between Gills Bay, Near John O’ Groats, and Burwick, the southern tip of South Ronaldsay, Orkney.

On 11 November 2022, at about 6pm, Varagen ran aground en-route to Westray. There were no reports of injuries to crew or passengers. The Varagen made the outbound voyage to Westray after being freed by the tide, but was then escorted back to Kirkwall by tugs to assess any damage.

== Service ==
MV Varagen is normally used on Outer North Isles services, connecting Kirkwall with Eday, Sanday, Stronsay, and Westray.
