= MV Thorsvoe =

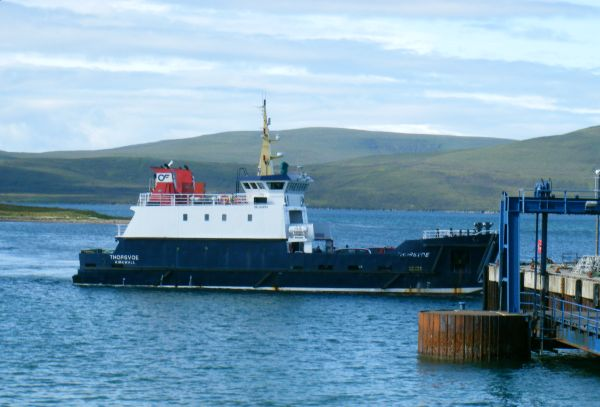
- MV Thorsvoe approaching Houton.

History

United Kingdom
- Name: MV Thorsvoe
- Owner: Orkney Islands Council
- Operator: Orkney Ferries
- Port of registry: Kirkwall
- Builder: Campbeltown Shipyard Ltd, Campbeltown
- Yard number: 89
- Completed: 1991
- Identification: MMSI Number: 235018907; IMO number: 9014743; Callsign: MNLY8

General characteristics
- Class & type: MCA Class IV
- Type: Ro-Ro Vehicle & Passenger Ferry
- Tonnage: 385
- Length: 35 m (114.8 ft)
- Beam: 9.5 m (31.2 ft)
- Draft: 1.8 m (5.9 ft)
- Ramps: bow/stern
- Installed power: 2 x 356kW
- Speed: 10.55 knots (19.54 km/h; 12.14 mph)
- Capacity: 121 passengers; 16 cars or approximately 75 tonnes

MV Thorsvoe is a Ro-Ro vehicle ferry operated by Orkney Ferries.

== History ==
MV Thorsvoe was built by Campbeltown Shipyard in Campbeltown in 1991.

== Service ==
MV Thorsvoe is kept as a relief vessel.
