= Una (ship) =

History
- Builder: Cochrane Shipbuilders
- Yard number: 31
- Completed: 1890
- Identification: Official number: 96214
- Fate: Sank

General characteristics
- Tonnage: 155 GRT, 80 DWT
- Propulsion: Triple expansion engine

Una was the first ship operated by Stateships in Western Australia.

== History ==
Una was built by Cochrane Shipbuilders, Selby, England for the Grimsby Union Steam Fishing Company. In October 1901 it was sold to JW Bateman of Grimsby, in January 1904 to JW Bateman of Fremantle, Western Australia and in 1908 to J Lynn of Fremantle.

In 1912 it was purchased by the Government of Western Australia to inaugurate Stateships' south coast service from Albany to Eucla.

In 1917 it was sold to Irvin & Johnson of Cape Town, South Africa. It sank in 1926 in shallow water off Cape Hangklip and was used as a jetty hulk for a whaling station.
