= Arctic Viking =

Trawler from Yorkshire, England

Coordinates: 54°18′N 0°21′E

History
- Name: Arctic Viking
- Owner: Boyds Line (Hull)
- Builder: Cochrane Shipbuilders
- Yard number: 1177
- Launched: 1986
- Christened: Arctic Pioneer
- Fate: Sunk May 1942 (refloated); Sunk 18 October 1961

General characteristics
- Tonnage: 501 (1937)
- Length: 166.7 feet (50.8 m)
- Beam: 27.6 feet (8.4 m)
- Depth: 14.2 feet (4.3 m)

The Arctic Viking (H452) was a British trawler ship that sailed from the Port of Hull in the East Riding of Yorkshire, England. Whilst the vessel was originally a commercial fishery ship, she also served as an anti-submarine vessel during the Second World War where she was sunk by enemy action. She was later involved in the Cod Wars, being actually targeted by a vessel from the Icelandic Navy. Besides her wartime service, she had two other accidents; one a collision in 1956 and another where she sank with the loss of five of her crew, 16 miles (26 km) off Flamborough Head in October 1961.

== History ==
The Arctic Viking was launched in January 1937 and was fitted out whilst afloat on the River Ouse in Selby.

During the Second World War, she was requisitioned into military service in October 1939 and named as HMT Arctic Pioneer, with pennant number of FY164. She patrolled the waters around Dunkirk during the evacuation of the British Expeditionary Force (BEF), but there is no record of her actually carrying stranded British service personnel back to Britain. She was converted into an anti-submarine ship and was sunk by enemy aircraft outside Portsmouth Harbour on 27 May 1942. 17 men were lost during the sinking, but she was later re-floated, largely due to the fact that the wreck was blocking one of the entrances into the harbour. The trawler had a refit at Hartlepool in 1947 and re-entered the North Sea fishing fleet operating out of Hull.

On 27 May 1956, the Arctic Viking was in a collision with another British owned trawler (the St Celestin (Note: Some sources state St Celstin.)) off the east coast of Iceland. The chief engineer of the St Celestin later stated that the Arctic Viking practically sliced the other ship in two and that the water was waist deep within a matter of seconds. All 19 of the crew were rescued by the Arctic Viking.

During the first Cod War, the ship was rammed and shelled by Icelandic trawlers and the Icelandic Navy respectively. On 30 April 1959, the Icelandic boat, Thor, attempted to detain the Arctic Viking after she was observed fishing in Icelandic territorial waters, something that the Icelandic Government viewed as Illegal. Thor tried to detain the Arctic Viking, and when the trawler refused to stop, warning shots were fired. This turn of events resulted in the destroyer HMS Contest firing on Thor to prevent this from happening. Thor had first fired warning shots at the Arctic Viking, then later aimed shots were fired to disable her mast and communications equipment. When HMS Contest fired star shells on Thor, she retreated.

The ship was operating out of Hull for the Boyd line at the time of its sinking in October 1961, under the pennant number H452. After a twenty-two day trip to the White Sea, the Arctic Viking was returning to her home port when she encountered 50-mile-per-hour (80 km/h) winds and "mountainous seas". As she neared the Yorkshire Coast, she kept rolling to one side, something that the skipper, Phillip Garner, took immediate action to try and remedy. However, she kept on listing and around 8:30 am on 18 October 1961, she rolled over so much that her mast and funnel were in the waterline and the vessel was abandoned by her crew.

The first reports of her fate were radioed in from other ships in the area, with one stating that she was on her side at 10:30 am, and another just 38 minutes later stating that she had sunk completely. The men who had survived managed to get into one of the two lifeboats on board the ship. One lifeboat was secured to the port side and the other to the starboard side, as the port side was under water, the fourteen survivors scrambled up to the starboard lifeboat and were rescued by the Polish lugger Derkacz. Five men perished in the sinking, with the storm delaying entry into the port of Hull for the Derkacz until two days after the loss of the Arctic Viking.

The wreck of the Arctic Viking was discovered in 2009, some 20 miles (32 km) off Flamborough Head and over 230 feet (70 m) down on the seabed. A dive team recovered the ships' wheelhouse telegraph which indicated the ship was set at full steam ahead when she went down.

== See also ==
- List of requisitioned trawlers of the Royal Navy (WWII)
