= NATO Science and Technology Organization =

Primary NATO organization for defence science and technology

- Predecessor: NATO Research and Technology Organization; AGARD, Defence Research Group, NATO Undersea Research Centre, SACLANTCEN
- Key people: Steen Søndergaard, Maj. Gen. Patrick Aufort, Dr. Eric Pouliquen
- Website: Official website

The NATO Science and Technology Organization (NATO STO) is a NATO agency that conducts scientific and military research across its member states and partner nations. It facilitates collaborative research and technology development among these states. The organization supports scientific research and technological collaboration related to NATO's objectives.

The NATO STO publishes a series of scientific reports and studies, most of which are available via the NATO STO publications website.

== History ==
=== From AGARD to RTO ===
The Advisory Group for Aerospace Research and Development (AGARD) was formed in 1952 and became an agency under the Military Committee in 1966. Its task was to foster and improve the exchange of information relating to aerospace research and development between NATO nations. AGARD also provided scientific advice, technical advice, and assistance to the NATO Military Committee in the field of aerospace research and development, particularly for military applications.

Theodore von Kármán was the founder of AGARD and served as its first chairman. During the first Conference of Aeronautical Research Directors from the NATO Nations in February 1951, delegates recommended the establishment of AGARD and unanimously adopted as a mission statement: "Bringing together the leading personalities of the NATO nations in the fields of science and technology relating to aerospace".

In 1958, Theodore von Kármán hired Moe Berg and accompanied him to the AGARD conference in Paris. AGARD aimed to encourage European countries to develop weapons technology independently rather than rely on the U.S. defence industry.

AGARD began in 1952 with four Technical Panels: Combustion, Aerospace Medical, Flight Mechanics, and Wind Tunnel and Model Testing. In the following two decades, five more panels were established: Structures and Materials (1955), Avionics (1957), Technical Information (1965), Guidance and Control (1965), and Electromagnetic Wave Propagation (1971).In 1971, the Aerospace Applications Studies Committee was founded for all aerospace systems questions outside the purview of the other panels.

Initially, AGARD had fewer than 100 Panel members. However, this number grew to 200 in 1960 and increased further after the number of panels expanded to nine in 1971. By the 1990s, there were more than 500 Panel members. After a restructuring in 1994, the number of panels was reduced to seven, and an additional Technical Information Committee (TIC) was established.

Panel members were appointed by their respective National Delegates, usually for three-year terms. The detailed areas of interest of each Panel varied rapidly as the field of aerospace science and technology expanded and as relationships between specialized fields changed over time. Broadly, each panel's mission was to support AGARD's overall mission within its own area of scientific and technical expertise.

Each panel defined a program of meetings and publications in its own specialty within the general constraints of AGARD policy as determined by the board. Panel members were responsible for enlisting the necessary support and participation from their own countries. Most panels held two major meetings each year, rotating among the NATO Member-Nations. The printing and publication of panel-written works (approximately 70-90 publications a year) was organized by AGARD Headquarters. Occasionally, some publications had up to 5,000 copies printed.

In January 1998, the need for a single focus in NATO for air, land, sea, and space R&T activities resulted in the merger of AGARD and the NATO Defence Research Group (DRG) into the NATO Research and Technology Organization (RTO). The DRG was one of seven "Main Groups" reporting to the Conference of National Armaments Directors (CNAD), meant to foster cooperation on research and new technology, potentially leading to future defense equipment.

The RTO's executive body was the NATO Research and Technology Agency (RTA), located in Neuilly-sur-Seine, France.

=== The Science and Technology Organization ===
On 1 July 2012, as a result of NATO Reform, the RTO was merged with the NATO Undersea Research Centre (NURC) to form the centre for Maritime Research and Experimentation (CMRE). Along with the newly created Office of the Chief Scientist (OCS) and the Collaboration Support Office, these three executive bodies became the Science and Technology Organization (NATO STO).

On 1 July 2026, the NATO STO restructured its Collaborative Programme of Work, introducing regrouped Scientific and Technical Committees (STCs) as well as new Capability Coordination Groups (CCGs), as part of an effort to better align scientific results with military needs.

== Organizational structure ==
The NATO Science and Technology Organization (NATO STO) is a subsidiary body of NATO created within the framework of the North Atlantic Treaty, signed in Washington D.C., on 4 April 1949.

The NATO STO delivers scientific research carried out by nine Scientific and Technical Committees (STCs) composed of scientists and engineers from NATO member and partner nations.

The NATO STO operates under the authority of the North Atlantic Council, which has delegated the organization's operations to the NATO Science and Technology Board (STB), composed of representatives from NATO Nations. The STB is chaired by the NATO Chief Scientist, who is permanently assigned to the NATO Headquarters in Brussels.

The NATO Chief Scientist serves two roles: scientific advisor to senior NATO leadership and chair of the STB. Recommendations are drawn from NATOSTO programs and related research, then synthesized for political and military decision-makers.

The NATO STO is composed of the STB, the Chief Scientist, and the following three executive bodies:

- The Office of the Chief Scientist (NATO headquarters, Brussels, Belgium) provides executive and administrative support to the Chief Scientist in exercising their three roles as STB chairperson, scientific advisor, and head of the Office.
- The Collaboration Support Office (Neuilly-sur-Seine, France) provides executive and administrative support to activities conducted under the NATO STO Collaborative Programme of Work.
- The Centre for Maritime Research and Experimentation (La Spezia, Italy) organizes and conducts scientific research and technology development. Its mission is centered on the maritime domain but may include other domains to meet customers' demands.

=== Major divisions ===
The work of each Scientific and Technical Committee (STC) is carried out by Technical Teams. Technical Teams are assigned by the STCs to perform specific tasks, such as:

- Research Task Group (RTG): enables researchers from different nations to collaborate on specific problems. Sponsored by the Panel/Group to meet NATO's needs, RTGs are chartered for a maximum of three years. Cooperative Demonstrations of Technology (CDTs) may be organized during an RTG, and findings are documented in NATO STO publications, such as technical reports or technical memoranda.
- Research Lecture Series (RLS): disseminates scientific knowledge to junior and mid-level specialists, scientists, and engineers in military-relevant domains. These two-day events are usually held at three locations and may include a round-table discussion. Outcomes from RLS are published as Educational Notes.
- Research Technical Course (RTC): transfers practical knowledge and recent field developments via on-site training/lectures to military decision-makers. An RTC can be offered up to four times, lasting one to three days. NATO STO publications are not always provided.
- Research Workshop (RWS): facilitates information exchange and discussion among invited experts. An RWS typically involves no more than 30 participants in a two- to three-day event, resulting in a NATO STO publication (Meeting Proceedings).
- Research Specialists Meeting (RSM): enables knowledge exchange among specialists (typically less than 100) with invited speakers on an important scientific or applied topic. An RSM results in an NATO STO publication (Meeting Proceedings).
- AGARD (Advisory Group for Aerospace Research and Development – AGARD): technical publications from AGARD focused on specific technical subjects for NATO’s aerospace and defence communities. Authored individually or collaboratively, they are intended to be authoritative references.
- Long-Term Scientific Study (LTSS): provides recommendations to NATO and national authorities based on the assessed impact that science and technology will have on military operations over the next 10-20 years. An LTSS examines emerging technologies, systems, and methods affecting tactical concepts and doctrines. Long Term Study Sessions are chartered for three years, including a Multinational Exercise (MNE), resulting in a NATO STO publication (Technical Report) and presentations.
- Military Application Study (MAS): a short-term, rapid-reaction study assessing the application of technology to operational procedures to solve operational and equipment deficiencies.

=== Centre for Maritime Research and Experimentation ===
The Centre for Maritime Research and Experimentation (CMRE) conducts scientific research in ocean science, modeling and simulation, acoustics, and other disciplines.

The CMRE researches technologies for uncrewed systems and autonomous decision-making. This provides operators with new technologies across the spectrum of expeditionary kinetic and non-kinetic capabilities required to defeat traditional threats and confront irregular challenges. The CMRE also provides science and technology enhancements to uncrewed vehicles and vessels, integrated defence systems, and autonomous intelligent systems that better enable operators to complete missions in hostile environments by avoiding, defeating, and surviving attacks.

== NATO STO Scientific and Technical Committees ==
The majority of STO research is carried out by nine Scientific and Technical Committees (STCs) under the STO Collaborative Programme of Work. This work is carried out by a network of more than 5,000 scientists and engineers from across the NATO Alliance, making it the world's largest network for collaborative defense science and technology research. As of 2026, there are approximately 450 ongoing research activities under the Collaborative Programme of Work.

=== Command, Control, Communication, Computing, Cyber and Information ===
The mission of the Command, Control, Communication, Computing, Cyber, and Information (C5I) STC is to advance cooperative science and technology development of interoperable and resilient C5I capabilities and technologies, in support of the Alliance’s information superiority. Its work focuses on enhancing secure decision-making, situational awareness, data exploitation, seamless communication, cyber resilience, and interoperability, in multi-domain operations and in all domains.

The C5I STC focuses on the following topical areas:

- Intelligent information systems
- Data
- Communication and network technologies
- Information assurance and cyber resilience.

=== Human Systems, Performance and Medicine ===
The Human Systems, Performance and Medicine (HPM) STC works to advance cooperative science and technology development that optimizes the health, performance, protection, and well-being of defense-related personnel in operational environments. This involves ensuring physical, physiological, and psychological well-being among military personnel, supported by technological systems and their integration. Its work covers a broad spectrum of theory, data, models, knowledge, and practical applications across two complementary domains: Health, Medicine and Protection (HMP), and Human Systems and Behavior (HSB).

The HPM STC focuses on the following topical areas:

- Medical support
- Operational medicine and environmental medicine
- Human augmentation and enhancement
- Human performance and protection
- Human factors engineering
- Social and organizational factors.

=== Kinetic Effects ===
The mission of the Kinetic Effects (KIE) STC is to advance cooperative science and technology development for effectors, kinetic weapon effects and counter-effects using kinetic means across physical domains. It researches and shapes kinetic weapon systems technologies and capabilities that enable, enhance and sustain kinetic concepts for effective, resilient, and cost-effective kinetic operations.

The KIE STC focuses on the following topical areas:

- Kinetic weapon systems and effectors
- Warheads, lethality and effects
- Protection systems employing kinetic means.

=== Modelling and Simulation ===
The Modelling and Simulation (M&S) STC convenes stakeholders and subject matter experts to coordinate and oversee the execution of the NATO Modelling and Simulation Master Plan (NMSMP). The NMSMP, a NATO policy document officially approved by the North Atlantic Council (NAC), offers a strategic vision and guidance for the effective coordination and utilization of modelling and simulation (M&S) within NATO. The overarching vision is to fully harness the potential of M&S across both NATO and member Nations, thereby bolstering operational efficiency and cost effectiveness.

The M&S STC's core mission is to promote collaboration among various Alliance entities, NATO itself, and partner nations in support of defense operations, with the ultimate goal of optimizing the practical application of M&S in support of defence operations. This encompasses various facets, including the standardization of M&S practices, educational initiatives, and the advancement of associated S&T. Furthermore, as designated by the Conference of National Armaments Directors (CNAD), the M&S STC holds the tasking delegated authority for overseeing standardization within the realm of NATO M&S.

=== Non-Kinetic Effects ===
The mission of the Non-Kinetic Effects (NKE) STC is to advance cooperative science and technology development in offensive and defensive aspects of cyber, cognitive, electromagnetic, deception, and acoustic capabilities, serving as critical enablers across all domains to ensure operational effectiveness and war fighter survivability. It focuses on the application of: electromagnetic warfare (EW), signature management, directed-energy weapons (DEW), force protection systems (FPS), cyber operations, acoustic effects, cognitive warfare, integrated system-level approaches, and integrated survivability.

The NKE STC focuses on the following topical areas:

- Electromagnetic warfare
- Signature assessment and management
- Directed-energy weapons
- Force protection systems employing non-kinetic means
- Cyber operations
- Acoustic effects.

=== Platform Systems and Technology ===
The mission of the Platform Systems and Technology (PST) STC is to sustain and enhance the technical superiority of military platforms (both crewed and uncrewed), propulsion, and power systems operating in all environments for new and aging systems, addressing evolving technological advancements and changing mission requirements, considering performance, survivability, affordability and safety aspects throughout platform systems and technology lifetime.

The PST STC focuses on the following topical areas:

- Mechanical systems, structures and materials
- Propulsion and power systems
- Performance, stability and control, and fluid physics.

=== Sensing Technology ===
The mission of the Sensing Technology (SET) STC is to advance cooperative science and technology development in the field of sensing technology for defence and security. It addresses the development and enhancement of both passive and active sensors, as well as associated technologies and capabilities, multi-sensor integration and fusion related to intelligence, surveillance, target acquisition and reconnaissance (ISTAR), remote sensing, electromagnetic warfare (EW), communications, and navigation.

The SET STC focuses on the following topical areas:

- Phenomenology
- Sensors
- Electronics (processing, components and sensor hardening).

=== Systems, Analysis and Concepts ===
The Systems, Analysis and Concepts (SAC) STC advances high level systems/concept development, analytical advice and systems integration, providing multi-disciplinary research and analysis to inform political, military and scientific/technological decision-making at all levels. It provides decision support through operational analysis and advanced system concepts, integration, and engineering in order to develop and maintain the next generation of integrated defense systems across all domains.

The SAC STC focuses on the following topical areas:

- Current and future defense challenges
- Concepts, integration, evaluation and experimentation
- Development and maintenance of methods and analysis capabilities.

=== Technology and Science Incubation ===
Technology and Science Incubation (TSI) STC is a group that works together on collaborative research. It focuses on science and technology ideas that other STO programs do not cover.

The TSI STC focuses on the following topical areas:

- Quantum technology
- Biotechnology.
