= MV Shapinsay =

- MV Shapinsay waits to load vehicles for the short crossing to Shapinsay.

History

United Kingdom
- Name: MV Shapinsay
- Owner: Orkney Islands Council
- Operator: Orkney Ferries
- Port of registry: Kirkwall
- Builder: Yorkshire Drydock, Hull
- Completed: 1989
- Identification: MMSI Number: 235019175; IMO number: 8814184; Callsign: MHOV8

General characteristics
- Class & type: MCA Class IV
- Type: Ro-Ro Vehicle & Passenger Ferry
- Tonnage: 199
- Length: 26.602 m (87.3 ft)
- Beam: 8.8 m (28.9 ft)
- Draft: 1.45 m (4.8 ft)
- Ramps: bow
- Installed power: 2 x 270kW
- Speed: 9.5 knots (17.6 km/h; 10.9 mph)
- Capacity: 91 passengers; 12 cars or approximately 40 tonnes

MV Shapinsay is a Ro-Ro vehicle ferry operated by Orkney Ferries.

== History ==
MV Shapinsay was built by Yorkshire Drydock in Kingston upon Hull in 1989. She was refurbished and lengthened by 6m in 2011 at an estimated cost of £1.5 million.

== Service ==
MV Shapinsay is normally allocated to the Inner Isles services between Kirkwall and Shapinsay.
