= Graemsay =

Island in western Orkney, Scotland

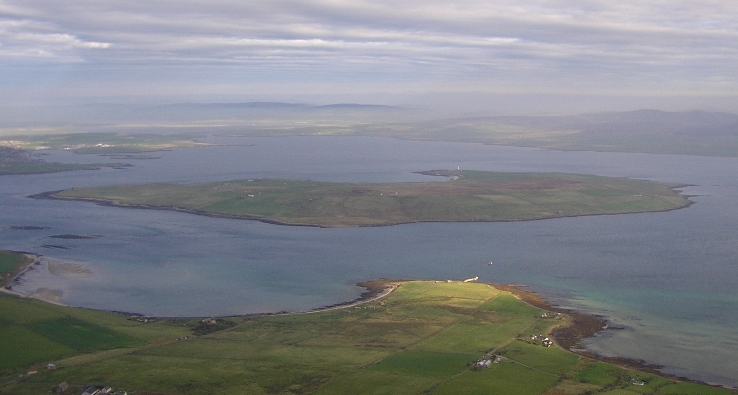
- An aerial view of Graemsay, from above Hoy

Location
- Graemsay shown within Orkney
- OS grid reference: HY255055
- Coordinates: 58.933°N 3.2833°W

Name
- Name meaning: Grímr's Island
- Old Norse name: Grímsey

Physical geography
- Island group: Orkney Islands
- Area: 409 ha (1.58 sq mi)
- Area rank: 76
- Highest elevation: West Hill 62 m (203 ft)

Administration
- Council area: Orkney
- Country: Scotland
- Sovereign state: United Kingdom

Demographics
- Population: 21
- Population rank: 59=
- Population density: 5.1 people/km^{2}
- Largest settlement: Sandside

Graemsay (/ˈɡreɪmziː/) is an island in the western approaches to Scapa Flow, in the Orkney Islands of Scotland. The island has two lighthouses. Graemsay lies within the parish of Stromness.

== Geography and geology ==
Graemsay lies between Hoy and Stromness on Mainland Orkney, separated from the Mainland by Clestrain Sound. The island is 409 ha (1.58 sq mi) in area and is mainly crofted.

The island's geology is Old Red Sandstone of the Devonian period, with two volcanic faults. On the north coast there is granite-schist, a great rarity in Orkney.

Graemsay is surrounded by strong tidal races, known locally as roosts. An Orkney Ferries service, usually operated by MV Graemsay, links the island with Stromness and Moaness on Hoy.

Graemsay is sometimes referred to locally as 'Orkney's green isle' due to its lush green vegetation cover.

== Wildlife ==
Birds include oystercatchers, ringed plovers, redshank and curlew. Parts of the island are largely undeveloped and are a haven for wild plants.

== History ==
As with many other Orkney Islands, there is a connection to the Celtic Church, possibly a pre-Norse one. There are the remains of two early churches, dedicated to St Bride and to St Columba, who are both saints of Irish origin.

The island has two lighthouses, Hoy High (NE) and Hoy Low (NW), both built in 1851 by Alan Stevenson for the 19th-century herring industry.

At the Point of Oxan in the far north west, in Burra Sound, are block ships, which were scuttled deliberately during World War II. This is a common feature of the straits and former straits around Scapa Flow. A Coastal Defence Battery also sits at the point of Oxan. Built in 1944, it guarded the western entrance to Scapa Flow until the end of World War II.

Graemsay primary school was built in 1876 and once had a peak enrollment of 60 pupils. In the late 1990s the school had four staff to just one pupil, making it the most expensive state school in the United Kingdom. The school closed in 1996. Today, the island's children travel daily by boat to school in Stromness on the ferry MV Graemsay.

== Lighthouses ==
Hoy Sound High Light
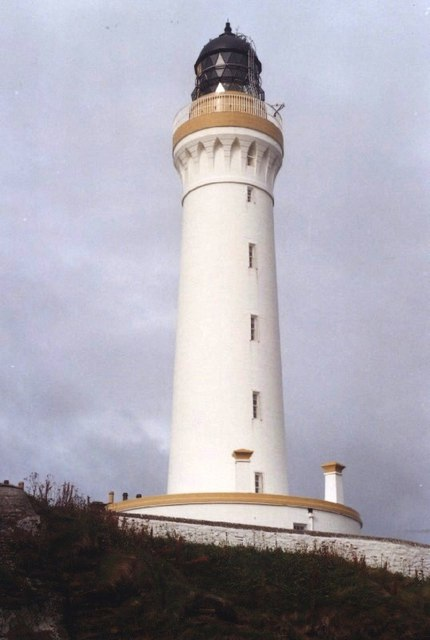
- Location: Graemsay, Orkney, Hoy and Graemsay, United Kingdom
- OS grid: HY2680906078
- Coordinates: 58°56′08″N 3°16′23″W

Tower
- Constructed: 1851
- Designed by: Alan Stevenson
- Construction: stone (tower)
- Automated: 1978
- Height: 33 m (108 ft)
- Shape: cylinder
- Markings: White (tower), black (lantern), ochre (trim)
- Operator: Northern Lighthouse Board
- Heritage: category A listed building

Light
- Focal height: 35 m (115 ft)
- Range: 20 nmi (37 km; 23 mi) (white), 16 nmi (30 km; 18 mi) (red)
- Characteristic: Oc WR 8s

Hoy Sound Low Light
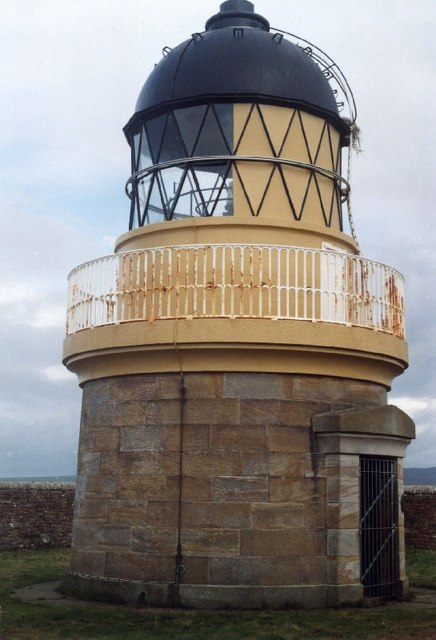
- Location: Graemsay, Orkney, Hoy and Graemsay, United Kingdom
- OS grid: HY2470806643
- Coordinates: 58°56′25″N 3°18′36″W

Tower
- Constructed: 1851
- Designed by: Alan Stevenson
- Construction: stone
- Automated: 1973
- Height: 12 m (39 ft)
- Operator: Northern Lighthouse Board
- Heritage: category B listed building

Light
- Focal height: 17 m (56 ft)
- Range: 12 nmi (22 km; 14 mi)
- Characteristic: Iso W 3s

Two lighthouses are present on Graemsay: Hoy Sound Low and Hoy Sound High located at the extremities of the northern side of the island. The lights were built in 1851 based on a design by Alan Stevenson; both are cylindrical towers with balcony and lantern, even if of different heights, white painted with black lantern and the typical ochre trims.

The Hoy High Light, known as Graemsay Island Range Rear, is 33 metres (108 ft) high and has a white and red occulting light every 8 seconds, depending on the direction.

The Hoy Low Light (Graemsay Island Range Front) is 12 metres (39 ft) high and is distinguished by a white isophase light every 3 seconds. The two Range lighthouses direct the ships towards the Hoy Sound from the Atlantic.

== See also ==
- List of islands of Scotland
- List of lighthouses in Scotland
- List of Northern Lighthouse Board lighthouses

== Book about the History of Graemsay ==
- the orcadian bookshop
