= McTay Marine =

English shipbuilder

McTay Marine Ltd
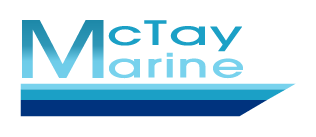
- Type: Private Company (dissolved)
- Industry: Shipbuilding
- Founded: 1974
- Founder: James McBurney, Jim Taylor
- Defunct: 2016
- Headquarters: Bromborough, Merseyside, England
- Area served: United Kingdom; South Africa
- Website: (http://www.mctaymarineservices.com)

McTay Marine was a shipbuilder in Bromborough, Merseyside from 1974 to 2016.

== History ==
McTay Engineering had been set up in 1963 by James McBurney and Jim Taylor. McTay Engineering specialised in the construction of storage tanks and associated plant. Taylor and McBurney had previously been employed by another shipbuilding company, and in 1973 they began to consider the building of small workboats and launches, leading to the formation of the subsidiary McTay Marine Ltd in 1974. The group was acquired by Mowlem in the late 1970s and by Daniel Contractors of Warrington in 2006.

McTay Marine Ltd was founded as a subsidiary of McTay Engineering. Over the following 39 years the company went on to build over 120 vessels, including several UK firsts. The company built the first beam trawler in the United Kingdom, which was also the largest built up till that time. The company also built the United Kingdom's first "Voith" tug and first "Azimuth" fitted tug. The McTay-built tug Trafalgar became the world's most powerful "Voith" tug on its completion and delivery in 1998.

The company went into liquidation in 2015 and the shipyard was taken over by Carmet Marine Ltd.

== Facilities ==
McTay Marine Limited was involved in the design, build and delivery of specialised ships and workboats since 1974. Located at its 6-acre site, at Bromborough on the banks of the River Mersey, the company built over 120 vessels over a period of forty-two years.

The shipyard had a build hall and engineering workshop. The build hall is 80 metres in length by 25 metres in height with 10.4-metre-high doors opening directly onto the slipway. The engineering shop is 50 metres in length and is directly adjacent. Overhead cranage is available in the form of one 25-ton and two 5-ton travelling cranes; engineering shop has similar capacities to hand.

The slipway has a maximum 300-tonne capacity, and can be used for both vessel repairs and also launch activities.

== Ships built ==
Shannon is a harbour and coastal tug, originally built in 1981 as the Eldergarth. The tug is noteworthy as the first British-built Azimuthing Stern Drive tug. Shannon has been acquired by Emu Limited and re-equipped in Southampton with a suite of specialist winches and a stern mounted 'A' frame.

During heavy rain, London's sewage storm pipes overflow into the River Thames, sending dissolved oxygen levels plummeting and threatening the species it supports. Two dedicated McTay vessels, oxygenation barges Thames Bubbler and Thames Vitality are used to replenish oxygen levels, as part of an ongoing battle to clean up the river, which now supports 115 species of fish and hundreds more invertebrates, plants and birds.

The £6.5M contract, to build the superstructure and assemble CRV Leonardo for NATO, safeguarded the jobs of McTay's 60-strong workforce. The Coastal Research Vessel now monitors submarine activity in the Mediterranean.

Yard No	Name	Date	Type	Owner
1	Unknown	1973	Launch	Timbacraft Ltd.
2	Quintail	1973	Workboat	Tarbert Boatyard
3	Unknown	1974	Survey Launch	Scott Watson
4	Sterling Steel	1974	Yacht	R Talbot-Smith
5	Sue Anne	1974	Workboat	T H Jones
6	Sharon Vale	1974	Fishing Vessel	Geo Moody
7	Unknown	1974	Workboat	Grangemouth Boatmen
10	Ocean Herald	1975	Fishing Vessel Seiner	Vessel ordered from James N. Miller & Sons Ltd, St Monans, where the vessel was completed. Construction of hull subcontracted to McTay Marine.
11	Fisher Rose	1976	Fishing Vessel Trawler	Completed by James N. Miller & Sons Ltd., St Monans.
12	Adelphi	1976	Fishing Vessel Seiner	Completed by James N. Miller & Sons Ltd., St Monans. Foundered 26 October 2006 when on guard vessel duties 160 mile East of Aberdeen.
19	Catriona of Kishorn	1976	Crew Boat, now Ferry	Howard Doris Ltd., Glasgow, now Rose of Aran with Doolin Ferry Co. Ltd., Galway
20	Shonag of Kishorn	1976	Crew Boat	Howard Doris Ltd., Glasgow, now Queen of Aran
22	Solbrun	1979	Fishing Vessel Trawler	1982 Hradfrystihus Stoduarfjordur, Stoduafjordur, now Frosti
24	Sine of Kishorn	1976	Crew Boat	Howard Doris Ltd., Glasgow, now St. Bridget
25	Mersey Trader	1977	Coaster	Alexandra Towing Co. Ltd., Liverpool, now Medway Trader
29	Girl Pat III	1978	Fishing Vessel Trawler	1985 T. Thomas & others, Penzance, now Georg Lou N.
30	Lothian Rose II	1978	Fishing Vessel Seiner / Trawler	Robert & Linus Clark, Musselburgh. Completed by James N. Miller & Sons Ltd, St Monans
31	Ben Loyal	1979	Fishing Vessel Trawler	1982 Peray S.A., Casablanca, now Atlassy Yasmine
32	Ben Roy	1979	Fishing Vessel Trawler	1983 K/S Ben Hav, Floro. Scrapped in 2002.
33	Glenugie IV	1980	Fishing Vessel Trawler	Donald Anderson & Caley Fisheries (Partnerships) Ltd, Peterhead. Foundered 24 February 1999 100 miles East of Shetland.
36	Harvest Venture	1980	Fishing Vessel Trawler	1983 Alf Snorre Isaksen, Tromso. Scrapped in 2008.
37	Sea Harvester	1980	Fishing Vessel Trawler	1983 Orjan Carlsson, Donso, Sweden, now Astrid Ann
38	Canada	1980	Tug	Alexandra Towing Company Ltd., Liverpool Later SMIT Canada, now Wellington
39	Traveller III	1981	Fishing Vessel Trawler	William B. Reid & others, Fraserburgh, Foundered, while fishing on 23 March 2000, 16 miles NNE of Shetland.
40	Eldergarth	1981	ASD Firefighting Tug	Rea Towing Co. Ltd., Westport, later with Svitzer as Shannon, now Safe Supporter 1
41	Rowangarth	1981	ASD Firefighting Tug	Rea Towing Co. Ltd., Westport, later with Svitzer
43	Sun Thames	1982	Firefighting Tug	Alexandra Towing Company (London) Ltd. Later Svitzer Sword, now BSV Anglia
44	MDB	1982	Fishing Vessel Trawler	1985 Ronald, David & Derek Bond, Fleetwood
45	MV Hendra	1982	33m ro-ro Ferry	Shetland Islands Council Ferries
46	Bon Marin de Serk	1983	Ferry	Isle of Sark Shipping Co.
47	Seal Carr	1983	Firefighting Tug	Forth Estuary Towage Ltd., Leith
48	Beamer	1983	Tug	Forth Estuary Towage Ltd., Leith
49	Stirling Elf	1983	Offshore Supply Vessel	Stirling Shipping Co. Ltd. Scrapped in 2016.
52	Deft	1984	Voith Firefighting Tug	Dover Harbour Board, now HT Scimitar
53	Dextrous	1984	Voith Firefighting Tug	Dover Harbour Board, now HT Cutlass
54	Bramley Moore	1984	Firefighting Tug	Later Smit Liverpool, now Jersey Shore
55	Oakgarth	1984	Firefighting Tug	Cory Ship Towage Ltd., Liverpool, now Mentor
56	Yewgarth	1985	Firefighting Tug	Cory Ship Towage Ltd., Liverpool, now BSV Irlanda
57	Hamtun	1985	Tractor Tug	Red Funnel Group, Southampton. Since 2006 operated by Multraship Towage & Salvage in the Netherlands under the name Multratug 16
58	Sir Bevois	1985	Tug	Red Funnel Group, Southampton. Later Svitzer Bevois, now Tug Beaver
59	Sun Anglia	1985	Firefighting Tug	Alexandra Towing Company Ltd., London, now Svitzer Anglia
60	Meridian	1985	Survey Vessel	Government of Trinidad & Tobago
?	Tarv	1986	Naval Tender	Royal Navy
?	Ohm's Law	1986	Naval Tender	Royal Navy
?	Cormorant	1986	Naval Tender	Royal Navy
65	L-713	1986	Naval Landing Craft	Royal Navy
66	L-714	1986	Naval Landing Craft	Royal Navy
67	L-715	1986	Naval Landing Craft	Royal Navy
68	Point Halifax	1986	ASD Tug	now Leonard M owned by McKeil Marine Ltd. https://mckeil.com/our-fleet/leonard-m
69	Shabwah	1987	Tug	Yemen Ports and Shipping Corporation, Aden
70	Almahrah	1987	Tug	Yemen Ports and Shipping Corporation, Aden
75	Cathy M	1986	Ferry	James Molinary Ltd, Gibraltar
77	Waterloo	1987	Tug	Alexandra Towing Co Ltd, Liverpool
78	Dorothy Gray	1988	Fishing Vessel Trawler	Terence Taylor, Aberdeen. Scrapped in 2003.
79	Thames Bubbler II	1988	Oxygenation Barge	Thames Water Utilities
80	Livinea	1989	Fishing Vessel Trawler	Bankstar Ltd., Buckie. Scrapped in 2008.
81	Seafalke	1988	Fishing Vessel Trawler	Seafalke Shipping Co. Ltd., Newhaven, now Jacoba
82	Moorhen	1989	Naval Mooring Vessel	Royal Maritime Auxiliary Service
83	Moorfowl	1989	Naval Mooring Vessel	Royal Maritime Auxiliary Service
84	Chartwell	1989	Survey Vessel	Osiris Hydrographic
85	Einar	1989	Firefighting Tug	Orkney Towage Co. Ltd., Kirkwall
86	Erlend	1990	Tug	Orkney Towage Co. Ltd., Kirkwall
87	MV Earl Sigurd	1990	45m ro-ro Ferry	Orkney Ferries
88	MV Earl Thorfinn	1990	45m ro-ro Ferry	Orkney Ferries
89	Sun Mercia	1990	Firefighting Tug	Alexandra Towing Company (London) Ltd. Later Svitzer Mercia, now Mercia.
90	Lady Anya	1990	Tug	Humber Tugs Ltd., Grimsby, later Svitzer Laceby, now BSV Franta
91	Lady Kathleen	1991	Tug	Humber Tugs Ltd., Grimsby, now Svitzer Kathleen
92	Lady Sarah	1991	Tug	Humber Tugs Ltd., Grimsby, now Svitzer Sarah
93	Lady Cecilia	1991	Tug	Humber Tugs Ltd., Grimsby, now Svitzer Cecilia
94	Lady Josephine	1991	Tug	Humber Tugs Ltd., Grimsby, now Svitzer Josephine
95	Cluain Tarbh	1992	Firefighting Tug	Dublin Port & Docks Board
?	Oileain Arann	1992	ro-ro Ferry	Order obtained by Miller's, St Monans at yard 1047. Vessel construction subcontracted to McTay Marine Ltd, where the vessel was built and completed.
100	Oil Bonny	1993	Tug	O.I.L. Marine Ltd., later Tidewater Marine
101	Oil Benin	1993	Tug	O.I.L. Marine Ltd., later Tidewater Marine
102	Oil Benue	1993	Tug	O.I.L. Marine Ltd., later Tidewater Marine
?	Oil Razee	1993	Tug	O.I.L. Marine Ltd., later Svitzer
113	AL 50	1994	Naval Patrol Boat	Greek Navy
114	Sayyaf	1994	Firefighting Tug	Abu Dhabi Petroleum Ports Operating Co.
115	Fidra	1995	Firefighting Tug	Forth Ports PLC, Leith
116	MV Loch Bhrusda	1996	35m ro-ro Ferry	Caledonian MacBrayne
117	Lyndhurst	1996	Firefighting Tug	Howard Smith Towage Ltd., Southampton, now Svitzer Lyndhurst
118	Lady Alma	1996	Tug	Howard Smith (Humber) Ltd. now Svitzer Alma [Svitzer Marine]
119	Trafalgar	1998	Firefighting Tug	Howard Smith Towage Ltd., Liverpool. Later Smit Trafalgar, now Sky 501
120	Thames Vitality	1997	Oxygenation Barge	Thames Water Utilities
121	MV Eilean Dhiura	1998	ro-ro Ferry	Argyll and Bute Council
122	Marigold	1998	Fishing Vessel Trawler	Hull by MC Fabrications, Falmouth, completed by McTay Marine.
123	Oban	2000	Naval Tender	Royal Maritime Auxiliary Service
124	Oronsay	2000	Naval Tender	Royal Maritime Auxiliary Service
125	Omagh	2000	Naval Tender	Royal Maritime Auxiliary Service
127	Portaferry II	2001	ro-ro Ferry	Strangford Lough ferry
128	Leonardo	2002	30m Coastal Research Vessel	NATO
129	Loch Portain	2003	50m ro-ro Ferry	Caledonian MacBrayne
130	Vital	2013	Multi-Role Vessel	Carmet TUG Company
