= The Ross Group =

- Company type: Private
- Industry: Marketing, Public relations
- Founder: Mary Hall Ross
- Headquarters: Los Angeles, California, U.S.
- Products: Consumer, celebrity, fashion
- Services: Branded Entertainment, Celebrity Endorsements, Product Placement, Marketing, Publicity, Public Relations
- Website: www.thereelrossgroup.com

The Ross Group is a privately owned full-service global film entertainment, brand, and celebrity marketing agency founded by Mary Hall Ross.

== About ==
The Ross Group manages and creates the placement of high-profile brands of watches, jewelry, clothing, purses, and alcohol in such movies as The Da Vinci Code, The Thomas Crown Affair, The Bourne Identity, Pretty Woman, and Legally Blonde. The company has a full-service office in Los Angeles.

Mary Hall Ross is well known for collaborating with clothing designer Nino Cerruti and the film Pretty Woman. Having experience both as a model for Cole bathing suits and as Director of Public Relations for Neiman Marcus, she is known as a contributor to the expansion of the Hollywood film industry and its dominance in the world market.
