= MV Earl Sigurd =

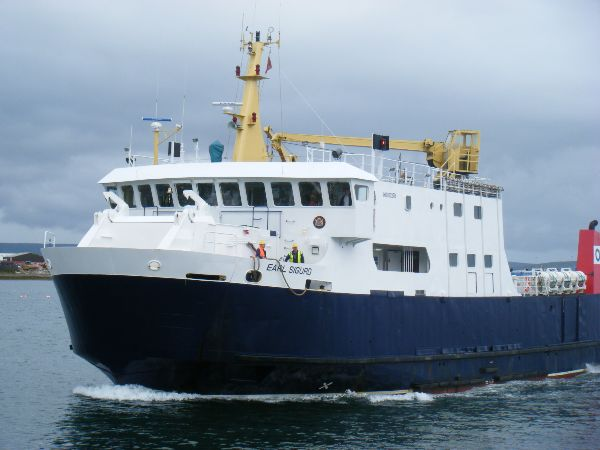
- MV Earl Sigurd approaching Kirkwall.

History

United Kingdom
- Name: MV Earl Sigurd
- Owner: Orkney Islands Council
- Operator: Orkney Ferries
- Port of registry: Kirkwall
- Builder: McTay Marine, Bromborough
- Yard number: 87
- Completed: 1990
- Identification: MMSI Number: 232000670; IMO number: 8902711; Callsign: MLKN9

General characteristics
- Class & type: MCA Class IIA/III
- Type: Ro-Ro Vehicle & Passenger Ferry
- Tonnage: 771 gt
- Length: 45 m (147.6 ft)
- Beam: 11 m (36.1 ft)
- Draft: 3.155 m (10.4 ft)
- Ramps: bow/stern
- Installed power: 2 x 743kW
- Speed: 12 knots (22 km/h; 14 mph)
- Capacity: 91/190 passengers; 22 cars or approximately 100 tonnes

MV Earl Sigurd is a Ro-Ro vehicle ferry operated by Orkney Ferries. It was built in 1989 by McTay Marine in Bromborough. It is normally used on Outer North Isles services, connecting Kirkwall with Eday, Sanday, Stronsay, Westray, Papay, and North Ronaldsay.
