= Papa Westray =

One of the Orkney Islands in Scotland, United Kingdom

Papa Westree (Scots)
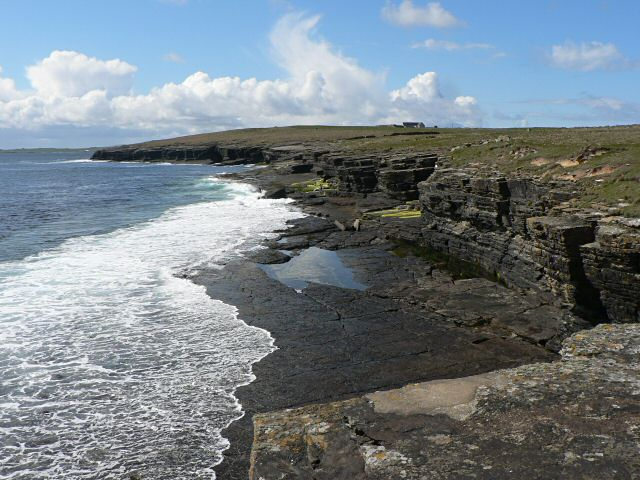
- Low cliffs on the east coast

Location
- Papa Westray shown within Orkney
- OS grid reference: HY488518
- Coordinates: 59.36°N 2.9°W

Name
- Name meaning: Old Norse for "big island of the papar"
- Old Norse name: Papey (hin) Meiri

Physical geography
- Island group: Orkney
- Area: 918 hectares (3.5 sq mi)
- Area rank: 53
- Highest elevation: North Hill 49 metres (161 ft)

Administration
- Council area: Orkney Islands
- Country: Scotland
- Sovereign state: United Kingdom

Demographics
- Population: 95
- Population rank: 46=
- Population density: 10.4 people/km^{2}
- Largest settlement: Backaskaill

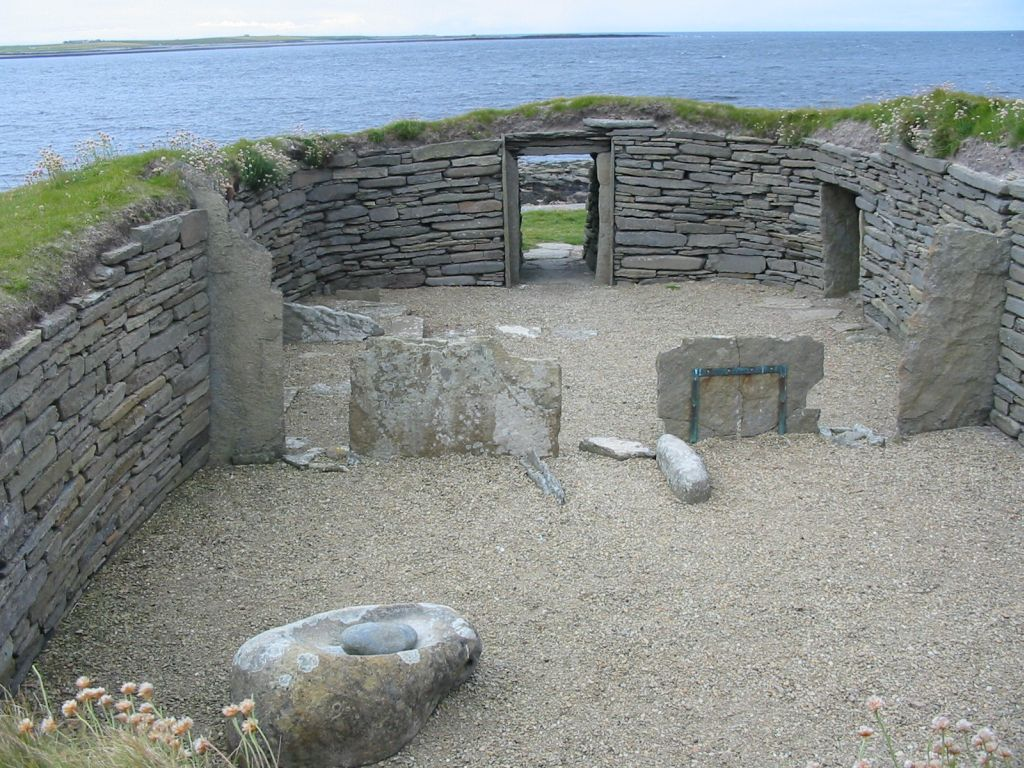
The main house of the Knap of Howar

Papa Westray (/ˌpæpə ˈwɛstri/ PAP-ə WEST-ree; Scots: Papa Westree), also known as Papay, is one of the Orkney Islands in Scotland, United Kingdom. The fertile soil has long been a draw to the island.

Attractions on the island include Holland House with an associated folk museum and the Knap of Howar Neolithic farmstead run by Historic Scotland.

It is the ninth largest of the Orkney Islands with an area of 918 hectares (2,270 acres). The island's population was 95 as recorded by the 2022 census, an increase of over 45% since 2001 when there were only 65 usual residents.

== Infrastructure ==
Orkney Ferries sail MV Charles Ann II from Papa Westray to Pierowall's Gill Pier. Twice a week (on Tuesday and Friday) the MV Earl Sigurd or MV Earl Thorfinn provide a direct service to and from Kirkwall on the Orkney Mainland, also serving either Rapness on Westray, or North Ronaldsay. There are also occasional summer Sunday excursions. Britten-Norman Islander aircraft operated by Loganair fly from Papa Westray Airport to Westray, North Ronaldsay, and Kirkwall; the hop from Papa Westray to Westray is the world's shortest scheduled flight, at approximately 2 minutes.

== Wildlife ==
At the northern tip of the island lies North Hill. At 49 metres (161 ft), it is the island's highest point and an RSPB nature reserve. Many seabirds breed on the island, including Arctic terns and Arctic skuas. It was one of the last places where the great auk was found; the last individual was killed in 1813. The reserve is also home to the rare and tiny purple-flowered Scottish primrose Primula scotica.

The sea around most of the island is a Nature Conservation Marine Protection Area, in place to protect the feeding grounds of the island population of black guillemot. More than 500 breeding birds visit these seas each year, with many nesting on the offshore islet of the Holm of Papa.

Both North Hill and the nearby Holm of Papa have been designated Important Bird Areas (IBAs) by BirdLife International because they support breeding seabirds.

== History ==
The Knap of Howar Neolithic farmstead (Historic Scotland; accessible at all times) is the oldest preserved house in northern Europe, dating from around 3500 BC. The homestead, which consists of two roughly rectangular stone rooms side by side, linked by an internal door, and with doors to the outside at the west end, is partially subterranean, and virtually complete to roof height. Examples of the round-bottomed Unstan ware have been found here, and provided the key to dating the settlement.

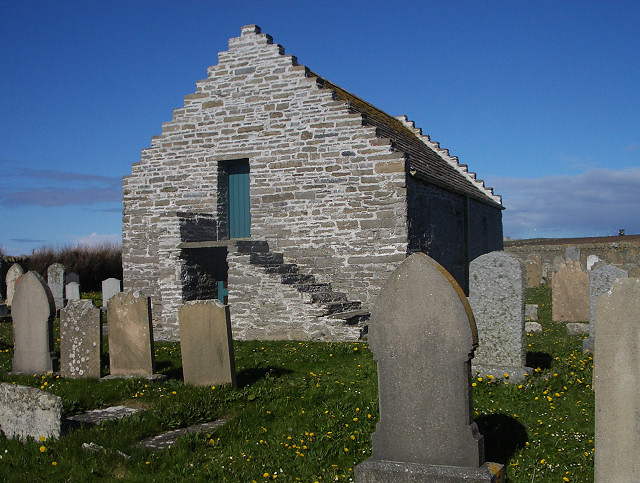
St Boniface Kirk

According to tradition, in the 8th century AD, the Pictish King Nechtan attempted to seduce a young woman from the island named Triduana, who in response gouged her own eyes out. She later became abbess of a nunnery at Restalrig, now part of Edinburgh, and was in due course canonised as St Tredwell. A chapel was consecrated to her on Papa Westray and became a place of pilgrimage for people with eye complaints.

The island is one of the 'Papeys' or 'islands of the papar'. Joseph Anderson noted that:

The two Papeys, the great and the little (anciently Papey Meiri and Papey Minni), [are] now Papa Westray and Papa Stronsay ... Fordun in his enumeration of the islands, has a 'Papeay tertia' [third Papey], which is not now known. There are three islands in Shetland called Papey, and both in Orkney and in Shetland, there are several districts named Paplay or Papplay, doubtless the same as Papyli of Iceland.

William Thomson suggests that "perhaps Papay Tercia was the Holm of Papay — not a separate papar-site but a holm subsidiary to Papa Westray".

Also on the island is the 12th-century St Boniface's Church (recently restored; open in summer) with a carved Norse "hogback" gravestone (probably also 12th century) in the churchyard. This stands on a substantial and largely unexcavated 9th century, or earlier, Pictish religious site – possibly including a bishop's residence. Remains of a heavily eroded broch can be seen on the shore. Early Christian carved stones, which may date from as early as the 7th century AD, found at this site are on display in The Orkney Museum in Kirkwall and the National Museum of Scotland in Edinburgh. These may be the earliest evidence for Christianity to survive in the Northern Isles.

Another ancient monument that can be visited is a well-preserved Neolithic chambered cairn on the small island of Holm of Papa Westray, a little east of Papay itself (and readily visible from the larger island). The long, stalled cairn, built of local stone, was once a communal burial place for the bones of an ancient community. It is protected by a modern roof and entered by a man-hole from above. This can be seen at any time of day, but visitors must arrange privately for a boat through the local co-op.

Papa Westray was the birthplace of the Orcadian educator and man of letters, John D. Mackay (1909 – 1970).

== St Tredwell's Chapel ==
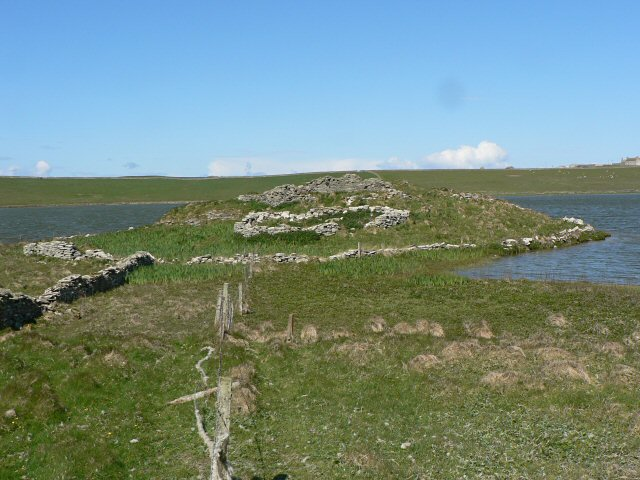
St Tredwell's Chapel, Papa Westray

The remains of St Tredwell's Chapel stand on a conical mound on a small peninsula (about 4.5 m (15 ft) high and 35 m (110 ft) across in St Tredwell's Loch. The remains of the late medieval walls can be seen, built over Iron Age remains, including a tunnel leading to a circular building or broch. The thick walls of the chapel and records of tracery work indicate an important and well-founded establishment.

The chapel was surveyed by Sir Henry Dryden in 1870 when its walls, of variable thickness, were still up to 6 feet high and the interior measured 20 ft 3in by 13 ft 10ins. The chapel was cleared of rubble by William Traill around 1880. He found 30 copper coins dating between the reigns of Charles II and George III under the chapel floor, along with a female skeleton.

In The Archaeological Sites and Monuments of Papa Westray and Westray, R.G. Lamb (1983:19) notes:

Immediately outside the W wall Traill broke into a subterranean passage which he followed N then NW for some 10m, passing several sets of door-checks and a side-chamber and entering a 'circular building'. Finds from this structure, including a stone ball, are in NMAS (...); others are in Tankerness House Museum (...). The opening into the passage is now blocked by rubble; it is likely that this was part of a complex of late Iron Age buildings, on the wreckage of which the chapel was built. It is possible that that a broch lies at the core of the mound, on the lower SE slope of which a revetment-wall, 1.9m high and traceable for 11m, may be part of an outer wall or ringwork. A few metres to the N of the chapel are the footings of two small subrectangular buildings of indeterminate date. A cross-slab is said to have been seen some years ago in the deep water besides the islet, but an attempted recovery was unsuccessful

Miraculous cures are associated with St Tredwell, particularly in those suffering from eye afflictions. Pilgrims travelled to Papay from all of Orkney and the north seeking a cure. Marwick, in a paper written in 1925, cites John Brand in his Brief Description of Orkney (1700) as having much to say of the chapel:

People used to come to it from other isles; before the chapel door was a heap of small stones, "into which the Superstituous People when they come, do cast a small stone or two for their offering, and some will cast in Money"; the loch is "held by the People as Medicinal"; "a Gentleman in the Countrey, who was much distressed with sore Eyes, went to this Loch and Washing there became sound and whole...with both which persons he who was Minister of the place for many years was well acquainted and told us that he saw them both before and after the Cure: The present minister of Westra told me that such as are able to walk use to go so many times about the Loch, as they think will perfect the cure before they make any use of the water, and that without speaking to any... not long since, he went to this Loch and found six so making their circuit..." "As for this Loch's appearing like Blood, before any disaster befal the Royal Family, as some do report, we could find no ground to believe any such thing.

In the 19th century the Minister of Westray, John Armit, noted that:

Such was the veneration entertained by the inhabitants for this ancient saint, that it was with difficulty that the first Presbyterian minister of the parish could restrain them, of a Sunday morning, from paying their devotions at this ruin, previous to their attendance on public worship in the reformed church. Wonders, in the way of cure of bodily disease, are said to have been wrought by this saint, whose fame is now passed away and name almost forgotten.

== In popular culture ==
The island is one of the principal locations in the 2024 film The Outrun, directed by Nora Fingscheidt.

== See also ==
- List of islands of Scotland
- List of Orkney islands
