= RV Corystes =

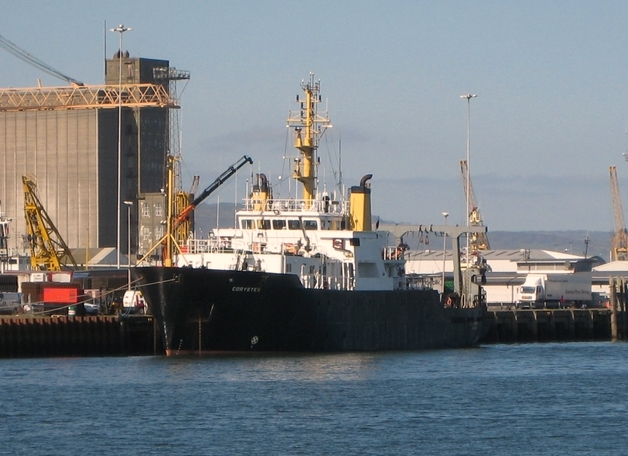
- RV Corystes in Belfast

History

United Kingdom
- Name: RV Corystes
- Namesake: masked crab (Corystes cassivelaunus)
- Operator: Cefas
- Builder: Ailsa Shipbuilding Company, Troon
- Yard number: 571
- Launched: 1988
- Out of service: 2005
- Homeport: Lowestoft
- Identification: IMO number: 8501517; Callsign: GHRU; MMSI Number: 233558000

History

United Kingdom
- Name: RV Corystes
- Namesake: masked crab (Corystes cassivelaunus)
- Operator: Agri-Food & Biosciences Institute
- Port of registry: Belfast
- Commissioned: 30 October 2006
- Homeport: Belfast
- Status: in service

General characteristics
- Class & type: DTp Class VII
- Type: Double-hulled, diesel electric research vessel
- Tonnage: 1,289 GT 284 DWT
- Length: 52.5 m (172.2 ft)
- Beam: 12.8 m (42.0 ft)
- Installed power: 2 x Allen S12; 2000kW at 7500 rpm
- Propulsion: 3m propeller and White Gill 40 VST azimuthing Bow Thruster
- Speed: 10 knots (19 km/h; 12 mph) (cruising); 12 knots (22 km/h; 14 mph) (max)
- Endurance: 9000 miles; 20 days
- Capacity: 11 scientists
- Crew: 16

RV Corystes is an ocean-going, research vessel operating around Northern Ireland. She is equipped with specialist fishing gear and acoustic techniques for surveys of fish stocks.

== History ==
RV Corystes was built for the Centre for Environment, Fisheries and Aquaculture Science (Cefas) and operated from a homeport of Lowestoft.

She was transferred to the Northern Ireland Department of Agriculture and Rural Development, (DARD) on 31 January 2005. In April 2006, the Science Service of DARD amalgamated with the Agricultural Research Institute of Northern Ireland, to form the Agri-Food & Biosciences Institute, who now operate the Corystes.

On 7 June 2006, Corystes rescued four from a life-raft, 20 miles east of Drogheda, after they abandoned the burning Kilkeel trawler MFV Noroyna.

== Layout ==
RV Corystes has 250 m^{2} of deck area. She has two trawl winches fitted with 1000m x 24mm warps and a net drum with 7 tonnes pulling power. There is a 7 tonnes stern A-Frame with 7m clearance and a smaller starboard A-Frame. She is equipped with a comprehensive range of navigation and echo sounding equipment.

== Service ==
RV Corystes is an ocean-going, research vessel which carries out marine fisheries, oceanographic and environmental monitoring and research, around Northern Ireland and nearby waters. She uses specialist fishing gear and acoustic techniques for surveys of fish stocks.
