= MV Graemsay =

Small passenger ferry operated by Orkney Ferries

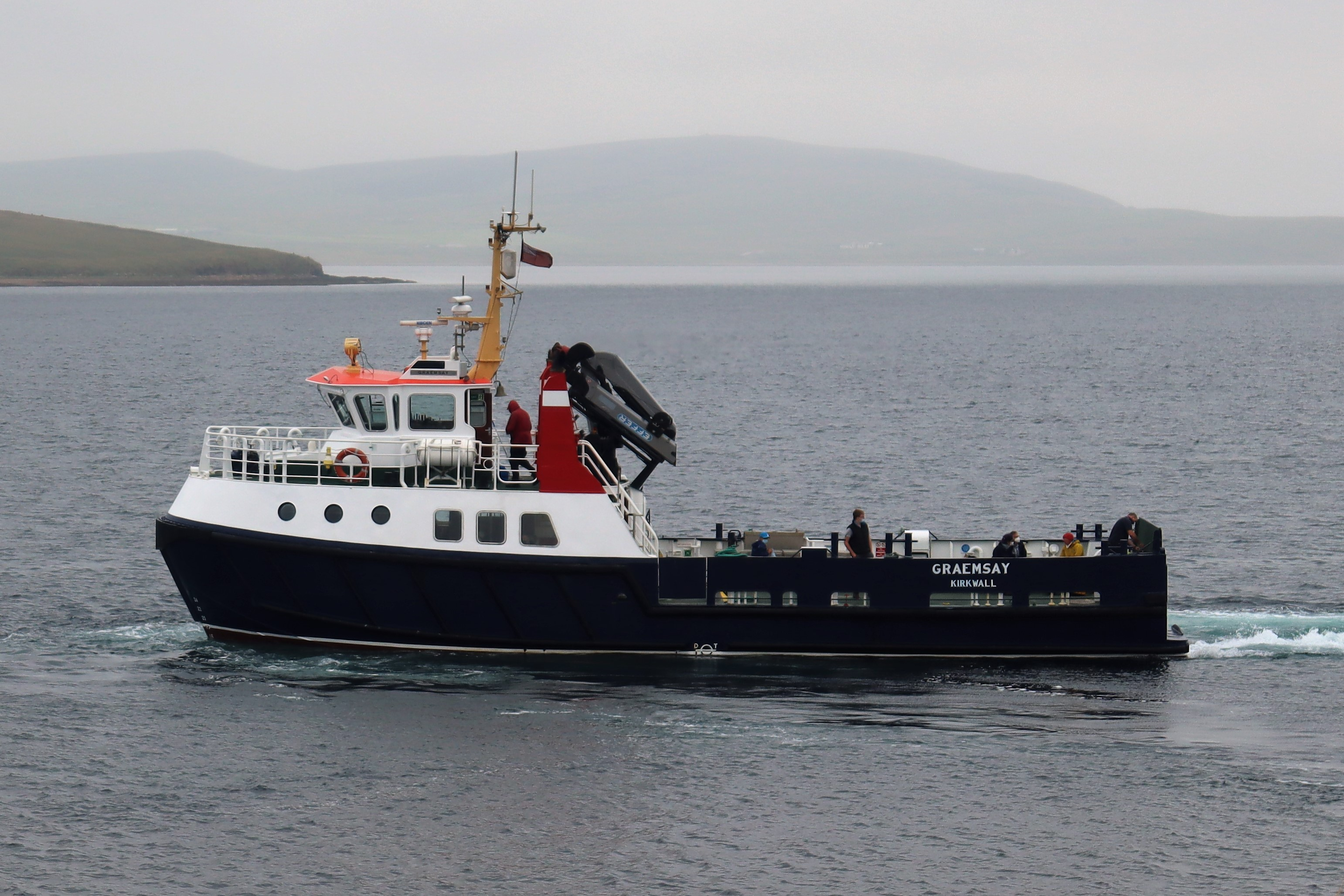
- MV Graemsay in Burray Sound, Orkney

History

United Kingdom
- Name: MV Graemsay
- Owner: Orkney Islands Council
- Operator: Orkney Ferries
- Port of registry: Kirkwall
- Builder: Ailsa Shipbuilding Company, Troon
- Completed: 1996
- Identification: MMSI number: 235019173; Callsign: MWJJ2
- Status: Active

General characteristics
- Class & type: MCA Class IV/VI/VIA
- Type: Small Passenger Ferry
- Tonnage: 81.87
- Length: 16.17 m (53.1 ft)
- Beam: 6.08 m (19.9 ft)
- Draft: 1.95 m (6.4 ft)
- Ramps: bow/stern
- Installed power: 2 x 224kW
- Propulsion: 2 x Volvo Penta D8 with Pumpjets
- Speed: 9.5 knots (17.6 km/h; 10.9 mph)
- Capacity: 73 passengers; 2 cars or approximately 12 tonnes

MV Graemsay is a small passenger ferry operated by Orkney Ferries.

== History ==
MV Graemsay was built by Ailsa Shipbuilding Company, Troon in 1996. Has been extended by 4.5m

== Service ==
MV Graemsay is normally allocated to the South Isles - Graemsay & North of Hoy Service.
