= Quholm =

Farm in the northeast of Shapinsay, Orkney, Scotland

Coordinates: 59.0732°N 2.8390°W

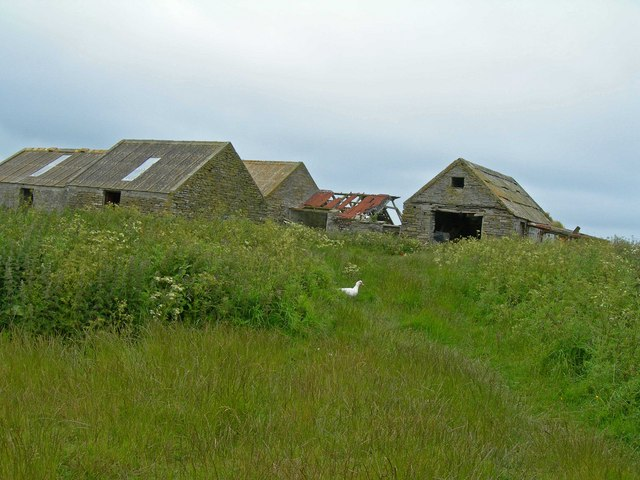
Quholm farmhouse was the birthplace of the father of Washington Irving.

Quholm (grid reference HY5221) is a farm in the northeast of Shapinsay, in the islands of Orkney, Scotland.

== Historical sites ==
Slightly to the south along Shapinsay's northwest coast are located the coastal ayres of Lairo Water and the Ouse situated within Veantro Bay. There are significant archaeological sites not distant from Quholm, including Odin's Stone, Burroughston Broch, Linton Chapel, Castle Bloody and Mor Stein.

== Notable links ==
William Irving, the father of Washington Irving, noted American author, was born in Quholm. Innsker Beach is situated very close by at the northwest edge of Quholm.
