= Scheduled monuments in Orkney =

Orkney shown within Scotland

A scheduled monument in Scotland is a nationally important archaeological site or monument which is given legal protection by being placed on a list (or "schedule") maintained by Historic Environment Scotland. The aim of scheduling is to preserve the country's most significant sites and monuments as far as possible in the form in which they have been inherited.

The process of scheduling is governed by the Ancient Monuments and Archaeological Areas Act 1979, which aims "to make provision for the investigation, preservation and recording of matters of archaeological or historical interest". The term "scheduled monument" can apply to the whole range of archaeological sites which have been deliberately constructed by human activity but are not always visible above ground. They range from prehistoric standing stones and burial sites, through Roman remains and medieval structures such as castles and monasteries, to later structures such as industrial sites and buildings constructed for the World Wars. Some buildings or structures which were both scheduled and listed have had their listing designations removed to reduce the duplication.

In 2017 there were 8238 scheduled monuments in Scotland.

== Notable scheduled monuments in the Orkney Islands ==
Name	Location	Description	Ref No	Image
Castle Bloody chambered cairn	Shapinsay	Prehistoric feature on the island of Shapinsay	SM1325	
Cobbie Row's Castle	Wyre	Ruins of the oldest medieval castle in Scotland	SM9007979	
Dennis Head Old Beacon	North Ronaldsay	Oldest surviving lighthouse in Scotland	SM6596	
St Nicholas Church	Orphir	Remains of 12th-century round church	SM13379	
Earl's Palace, Birsay	Birsay	Ruined 16th-century palace	SM90033	
St Magnus Church, Egilsay	Egilsay	Roofless medieval church and part of adjacent burial ground	SM90137	
Eynhallow Church	Eynhallow	Medieval church and later settlement	SM90144	
Bishop's Palace	Kirkwall	12th-century palace of the Bishop of Orkney	SM90193	
Earl's Palace, Kirkwall	Kirkwall	Ruined 17th-century Renaissance-style palace of Earl of Orkney	SM90194	
Knowe of Yarso Chambered Cairn	Rousay	Neolithic chambered burial cairn c.2900 BC	SM90198	
Noltland Castle	Pierowall	Incomplete 16th-century castle	SM90231	
Quoyness chambered cairn	Sanday	Neolithic chambered burial cairn on Els Ness	SM90243	
Rennibister Earth House	Bay o' Firth, Orkney	Souterrain accessed by hatch in modern roof	SM90245	
Stenness Standing Stones	Stenness	A stone circle, henge and all other remains	SM90285	
Taversöe Tuick Chambered Cairn	Rousay	Chambered cairn containing two levels of chamber	SM90297	

== See also ==
- List of Category A listed buildings in Orkney
- Heart of Neolithic Orkney World Heritage Site
