= Lairo Water =

Surface water body known as an ayre in the Orkney Islands

Coordinates: 59°3′21″N 2°51′20″W

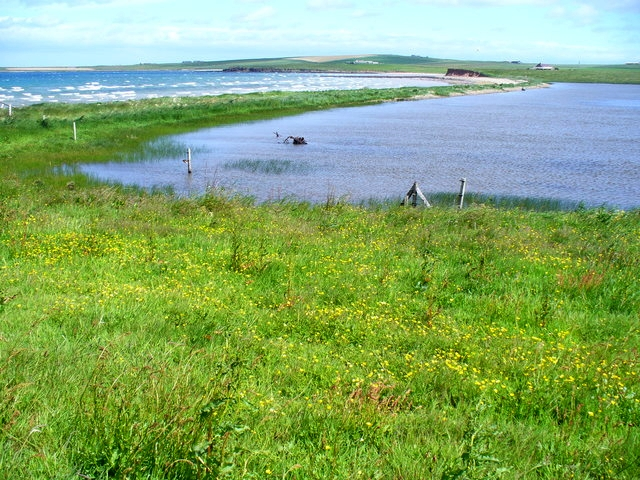
Lairo Water

Lairo Water is a surface water body known as an ayre situated on the western coast of Shapinsay in the Orkney Islands. This brackish water body is separated by a narrow bar of land from Veantro Bay. This wetland is an area where a variety of bird species may be found. Hogan has suggested that the Lairo Water may have been a source of subsistence food for prehistoric inhabitants of Shapinsay at Burroughston Broch.

== See also ==
- The Ouse
- Quholm
- Vasa Loch
