= St. Mary's Chapel, Wyre =

Historic church located on the island of Wyre, Orkney, Scotland

Coordinates: 59°07′11″N 2°58′29″W

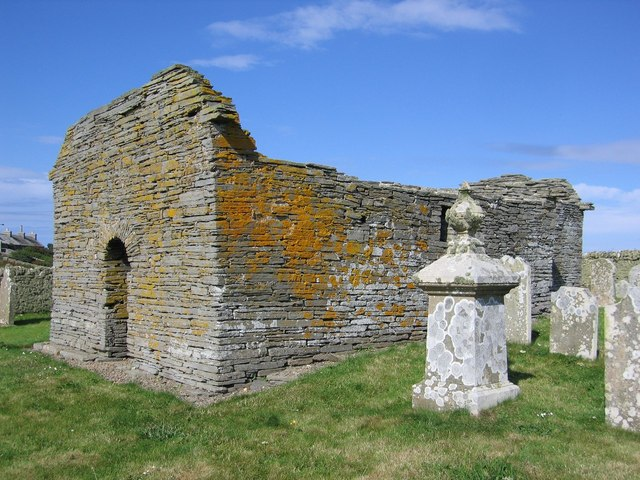
St. Mary's Chapel, Wyre

St. Mary's Chapel is a ruined 12th-century chapel found on the island of Wyre, in Orkney, Scotland. It is thought to have been built by a Norse chieftain, Kolbeinn hrúga or his son, Bjarni Kolbeinsson, Bishop of Orkney. The now roofless Romanesque style building was originally constructed of local rubble and lime mortar. During the late 19th century, the building was restored. Historic Environment Scotland established the site, which includes the church and walled burial ground, as a scheduled monument in 1929.

== Description ==
St. Mary's Church can be found on the northwest side of the island of Wyre in Orkney, Scotland. The church and surrounding cemetery lie at the bottom of the hill where the ruined medieval fort, Cobbie Row's Castle stands. The roofless Romanesque style chapel was constructed of local rubble and lime mortar. The building dates from the mid to late 12th century. It consists of a rectangular nave and chancel. The nave measures 5.87 m (19.3 ft) by 3.9 m (13 ft) and the chancel is 2.42 m (7 ft 11 in) by 2.2 m (7 ft 3 in). A round-arched door leads into the nave, which is separated from the chancel by another archway. There are three small windows in the south wall. The remains of the original plaster are evident in both the nave and the chancel. The walled cemetery has been enlarged over time and continues to be used.

== History ==
The chapel was built in the mid to late 12th century by Kolbeinn hrúga or his son, Bjarni Kolbeinsson, the Bishop of Orkney, Hrúga was a Norse chieftain, who was born in Sunnfjord, Norway, and migrated to Orkney around 1142 AD. According to the Orkneyinga saga, hrúga built a stone fort on the island of Wyre. The remains of that fort is today known as Cobbie Row's Castle. The existence of the stone fort and nearby chapel, along with the historic record describing the importance of Kolbeinn hrúga, suggest that Wyre was once an important and prosperous Norse estate.

By the late 18th century, the chapel was abandoned and in ruins. During the late 19th century, the building was cleared and sections of the walls were rebuilt. During the restoration, a grave was uncovered inside the chapel with the remains of a tall, powerfully built man. The baptismal font, broken in two, was also uncovered during restoration. It was later moved to the Trumland House on the island of Rousay.

Historic Environment Scotland established the site as a scheduled monument in 1929. The monument consists of the ruins of St. Mary's chapel and its walled cemetery.

== Gallery ==
St. Mary's Chapel

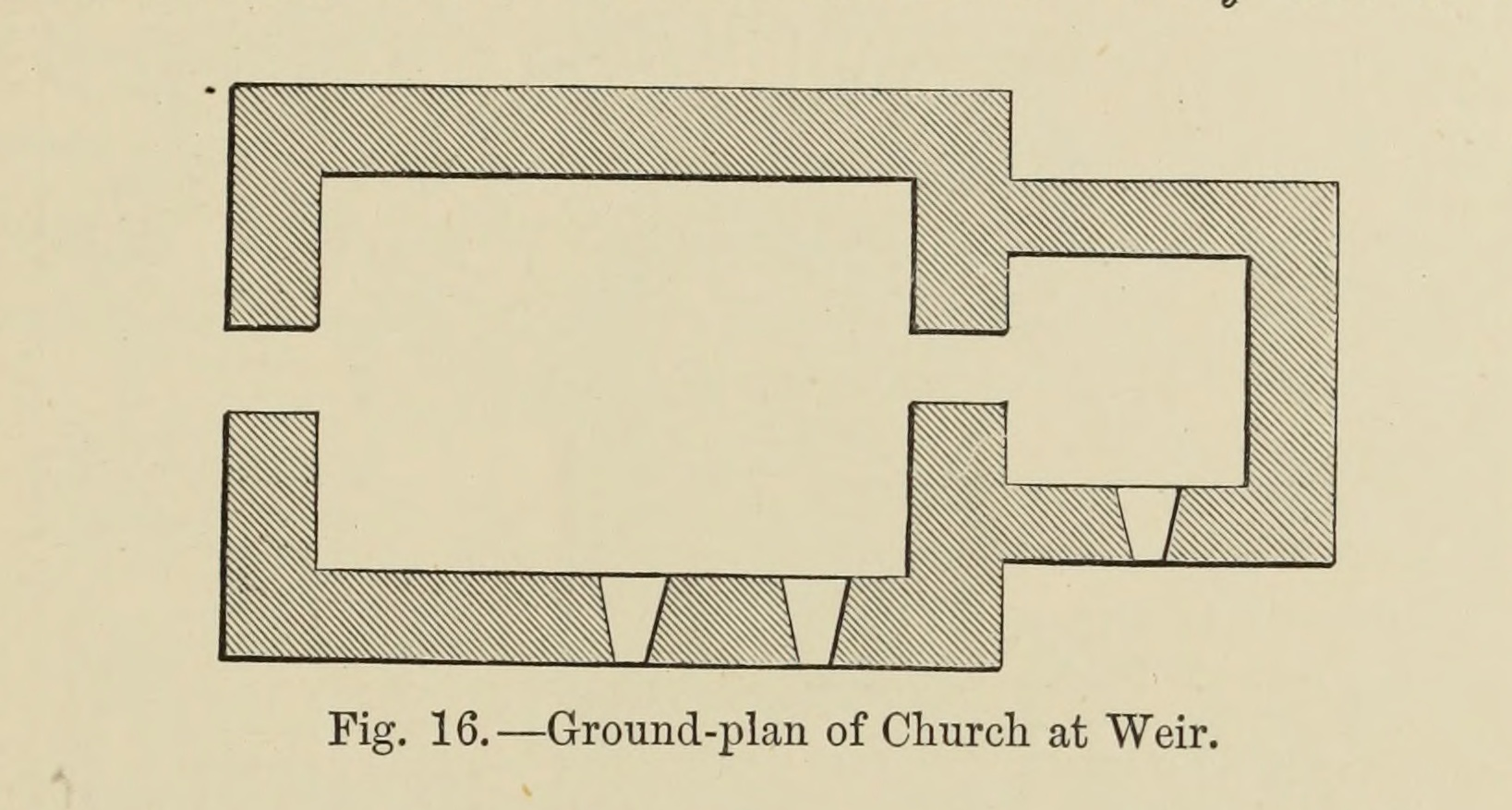

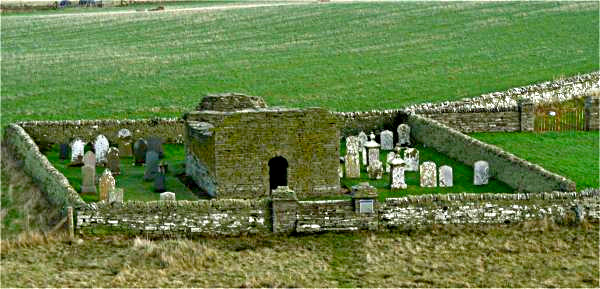

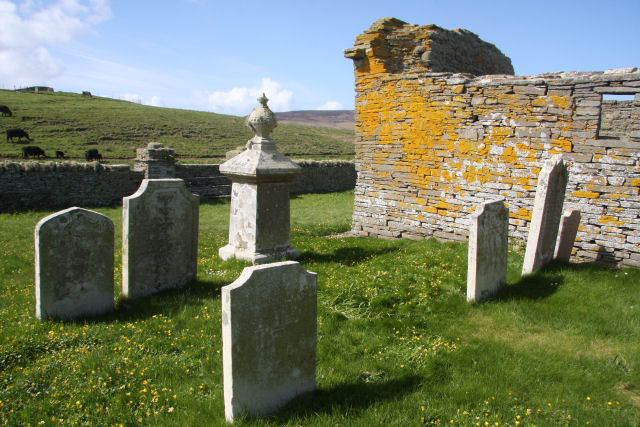

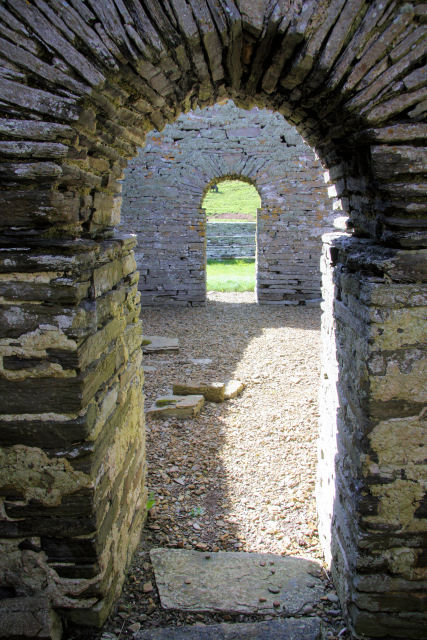

== See also ==
- Eynhallow Church
- St Boniface's Church, Papa Westray
- List of churches in Orkney
