= Mill Dam =

Wetland on the Orkney Islands, Scotland

Coordinates: 59°2′31″N 2°53′46″W

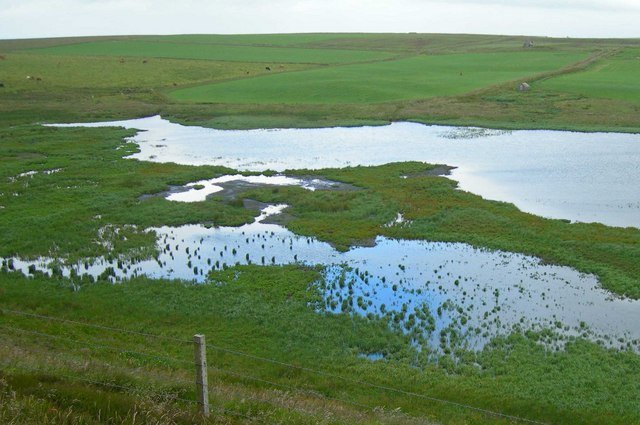
Mill Dam wetlands.

Mill Dam is a wetland in western Shapinsay, in Orkney, Scotland.

This water body was not shown on the 1840 survey map of the island, since it is a man-made creation from a damming in the 1880s. Mill Dam is fed by a stream flowing from the north that rises on the western lobe of Shapinsay. The pH levels of the outflow stream of Mill Dam are moderately alkaline, in the range of 9.18. The Mill Dam wetland is a significant bird habitat and is owned and managed by the Royal Society for the Protection of Birds. It has been designated an Important Bird Area (IBA) by BirdLife International because it supports resident northern pintails and wintering whooper swans.

== See also ==
- Balfour Castle
- Burroughston Broch
- The Ouse
- Vasa Loch
