= Veantro Bay =

Bay in the Orkney Islands, Scotland

Coordinates: 59°4′N 2°52′W

Veantro Bay is a bay on the northwest coast of Shapinsay in the Orkney Islands, Scotland.

At the head of the bay is a large stone, thought to be associated with Viking settlement of Shapinsay, known as the Odin's Stone. It has been suggested that prehistoric man on Shapinsay, who inhabited Castle Bloody and Burroughston Broch, would have exploited the seafood resources of Lairo Water, an ayre at Veantro Bay. In 2005, the Orkney Community Councils opposed an application for a fish farm on Veantro Bay citing environmental concerns and competition with local fishermen.

== See also ==
- Lairo Water
- Quholm
