= List of Category A listed buildings in Orkney =

Orkney shown within Scotland

This is a list of Category A listed buildings in the Orkney council area in central Scotland.

In Scotland, the term listed building refers to a building or other structure officially designated as being of "special architectural or historic interest". Category A structures are those considered to be buildings of "national or international importance, either architecturally or historically". Listing was begun by a provision in the Town and Country Planning (Scotland) Act 1947, and the current legislative basis for listing is the Planning (Listed Buildings and Conservation Areas) (Scotland) Act 1997. The authority for listing rests with Historic Environment Scotland, an executive agency of the Scottish Government, which inherited this role from the Scottish Development Department in 1991. Once listed, severe restrictions are imposed on the modifications allowed to a building's structure or its fittings. Listed building consent must be obtained from local authorities prior to any alteration to such a structure. There are approximately 47,000 listed buildings in Scotland, of which around 8 percent (some 3,800) are Category A.

The council area of Orkney comprises an archipelago of around 70 islands, including 20 inhabited islands with a total population of around 20,000. There are 20 Category A listed buildings on the islands.

== Listed buildings ==
Name	Location	Date listed	Geo-coordinates	Notes	LB number	Image
Dennis Head Old Beacon, including remains of Keepers' Houses	North Ronaldsay	8 December 1971	59°23′03″N 2°22′16″W		5891	Upload another image See more images
Italian Chapel, including statue	Lamb Holm	4 June 1987	58°53′23″N 2°53′27″W		12728	Upload another image See more images
Hoy Sound High Lighthouse including Keepers' Houses, Boundary Walls and Gatepiers	Graemsay	9 December 1977	58°56′08″N 3°16′24″W		12736	Upload another image See more images
Sule Skerry Lighthouse	Sule Skerry	8 December 1971	59°06′18″N 2°39′43″W		18598	Upload another image
Balfour Castle	Shapinsay	8 December 1971	59°01′54″N 2°55′00″W		18615	Upload another image See more images
Skaill House	Skara Brae, Mainland	8 December 1971	59°02′51″N 3°20′12″W		18704	Upload another image See more images
Melsetter House	Hoy	8 December 1971	58°47′08″N 3°15′48″W		18712	Upload another image See more images
Rysa Lodge	Hoy	9 December 1977	58°50′52″N 3°12′15″W		18714	Upload Photo
North Kirk (St Peter's) and Kirkyard	South Ronaldsay	8 December 1971	58°48′07″N 2°55′04″W		18718	Upload another image See more images
Pentland Skerries Lighthouses	Muckle Skerry	8 December 1971	58°41′25″N 2°55′29″W		18728	Upload another image See more images
Hall of Clestrain	Orphir, Mainland	8 December 1971	58°56′51″N 3°13′27″W		19892	Upload another image See more images
Sandwick Kirk (St. Peter's)	Sandwick, Mainland	9 December 1977	59°03′32″N 3°20′11″W		19904	Upload another image See more images
St Magnus Cathedral	Kirkwall, Broad Street	8 December 1971	58°58′53″N 2°57′36″W		36668	Upload another image See more images
Orkney Museum	Kirkwall, Broad Street	8 December 1971	58°58′53″N 2°57′40″W		36677	Upload another image See more images
Sheep Dyke and associated punds	North Ronaldsay	16 September 1999	59°22′19″N 2°24′55″W		46400	Upload another image
Melsetter House, Chapel	Hoy	8 December 1971	58°47′08″N 3°15′50″W		48359	Upload another image
Melsetter House, Kitchen Garden including Tea-House and Doocot, Rookery Walls and Gatepiers	Hoy	8 December 1971	58°47′05″N 3°15′50″W		48362	Upload Photo
Scapa Flow Visitor Centre, former Steam Pumping Station and Oil Storage Tank	Hoy	21 July 2006	58°50′01″N 3°11′48″W		50533	Upload another image See more images
Churchill Barrier No 3 Glimps Holm to Burray	Glimps Holm to Burray	18 November 2016			52392	Upload another image See more images
Churchill Barrier No 4 Burray to South Ronaldsay	Burray to South Ronaldsay	18 November 2016			52417	Upload another image See more images

== See also ==
- Scheduled monuments in Orkney
