= Geo of Ork =

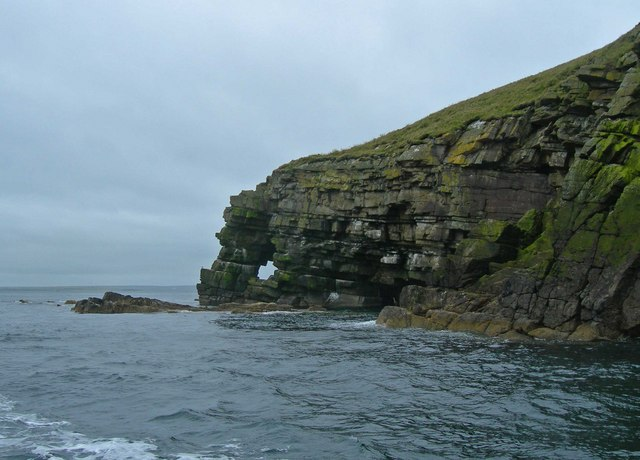
Geo of Ork from the sea.

The Geo of Ork is a narrow and deep cleft in the cliff face of the northernmost point on the island of Shapinsay in the Orkney islands. The term geo or gya derives from Old Norse gjá. This landform was created by the wave driven erosion of cliffs along faults or bedding planes in the rock. A well-preserved prehistoric broch lies slightly to the south of Geo of Ork on the eastern coast of Shapinsay. This drystone broch has extant remains of ancient stone furniture inside.

== See also ==
- Burroughston Broch
- Quholm
