= Bay of Linton =

Bay in the Orkney Islands, Scotland

Coordinates: 59.0481°N 2.8164°W

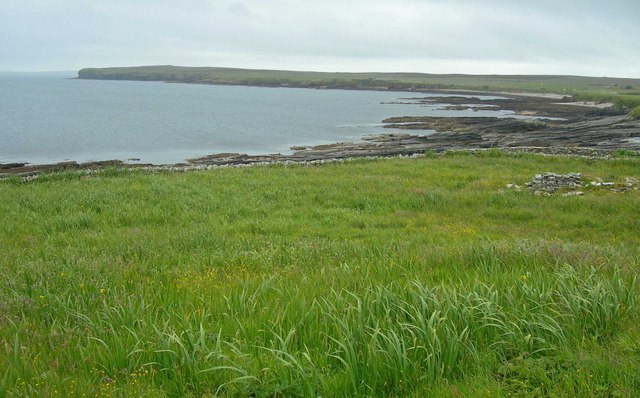
Linton Bay, Shapinsay. Courtesy: C. Michael Hogan

The Bay of Linton is a bay on the east coast on the island of Shapinsay in the Orkney Islands, Scotland. To the north of Linton Bay are the headlands of Ness of Ork, and to the south is The Foot. The ancient monument the Broch of Burroughston is slightly north of Linton Bay.
