= Vasa Loch =

Lagoon on Orkney islands

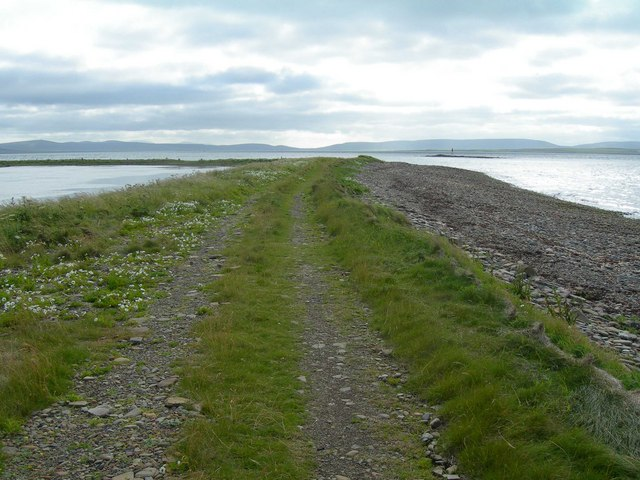
- Raised beach separating Vasa Loch (left) from the sea.

- Location within Orkney Islands
- Location: Shapinsay, Orkney Islands, Scotland
- Coordinates: 59.050°N 2.923°W
- Lake type: brackish
- Basin countries: United Kingdom
- Max. length: 300 m (980 ft)
- Max. width: 200 m (660 ft)
- Surface elevation: 1 m (3.3 ft)
- Islands: none
- Settlements: Balfour

Vasa Loch is a brackish lagoon in southwestern Shapinsay, Orkney Islands. (Ordnance, 2002) This water body has been shown on early maps of the island in a very similar shape and size to its current geometry, separated from the North Sea by a narrow strip of raised beach.(Masters, 1840) Vasa Loch is fed by small rivulets and upland springs that rise on the western part of the island's western spur. pH levels of the loch are strongly alkaline, in the range of 10.15. (Hogan, 2006)

== Geology ==
The particular landform associated with Vasa Loch is an ayre, derived from the Old Norse word used to depict a lake which is only separated by a narrow strip of low-lying land from the sea itself.(Shapinsay)

== Notes ==
- Ordnance Survey Map, Landranger, United Kingdom, 1:50,000 (2002)
- G.T, Masters, Orkney, Approaches to Kirkwall, HMS official survey map, 1840–1843
- C.M Hogan, Natural History of the Orkney Islands (2006)
- Shapinsay Island, Orkney

== See also ==
- Balfour Castle
- Burroughston Broch
- The Ouse
