= Linton Chapel =

Ruined chapel in Orkney Islands, Scotland

Coordinates: 59.0521°N 2.8215°W

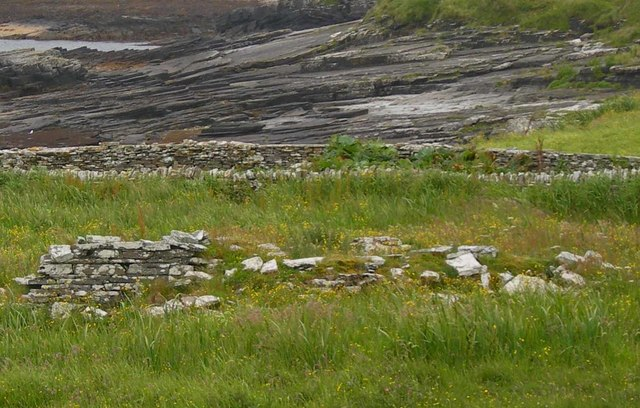
Ruins of Linton chapel

Linton Chapel is a ruined chapel on the east coast of Shapinsay, Orkney (Grid Reference HY5218). The chapel is thought to date as early as the 12th century AD. Slightly to the south is a megalithic monument, Castle Bloody.

== See also ==
- Mor Stein
