= Castle Bloody =

Prehistoric feature on the island of Shapinsay, Scotland

Coordinates: 59.0324°N 2.8102°W

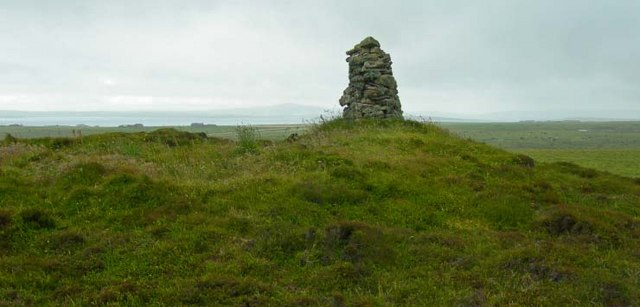
Castle Bloody souterrain – rock construction is not part of the souterrain.

Castle Bloody is a prehistoric feature on the island of Shapinsay, Orkney, Scotland. Hogan observes that while the feature is marked as a chambered mound on the UK Ordnance Survey map, the structure is more properly and specifically classified as a souterrain or earth house. Slightly to the north is located the ruined historic Linton Chapel.

It is protected as a scheduled monument.

== See also ==
- Mor Stein – Neolithic standing stone on the island of Shapinsay, Scotland
- Scheduled monuments in Orkney
