= Cobbie Row's Castle =

Ruins of a 12th century castle on the island of Wyre, Orkney, Scotland

Coordinates: 59.1198°N 2.9768°W

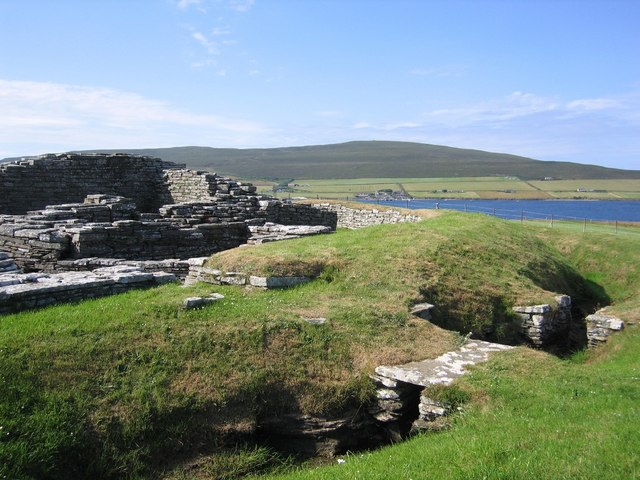
Cobbie Row's Castle

Cobbie Row's (or Cubbie Roo's) Castle is the oldest medieval castle known to exist in Scotland. The castle ruins are located on the island of Wyre in Orkney. Built in the mid-12 century by Norse landowner, Kolbeinn hrúga, the stone fortification originally consisted of a small, central tower set in an oval enclosure, surrounded by two ditches, a stone wall and an earthen rampart. Historic Environment Scotland established the site as a scheduled monument in 1929.

== Description ==
The remains of the early medieval stone fort sits on a low hill on the island of Wyre in Orkney, Scotland. The earliest building on the site is the small tower, measuring approximately 8 m (26 ft) square and has remaining walls that are 2.34 m (7 ft 8 in) in height and are approximately 2 m (6 ft 7 in) thick. The ground floor is the only surviving floor in the tower, and was constructed with coursed rubble. A narrow ledge on the north wall, originally used to support joists on the first floor, is also visible. It is believed that interior ladders were used to gain access to the first floor, since there is no ground floor doorway. The ground floor was most likely used for storage supplies. It originally contained a water tank that also may have been used to store live fish. The tank was cut into solid rock.

The tower stands on a platform and was surrounded by an oval enclosure of two ditches, a stone wall and an embankment. The main entrance to the enclosure lay to the east, across a bridge made of flagstone. The remaining outer defenses are to the north, west and east of the tower. Defenses south of the tower have disappeared under later extensions. Excavation of the site has revealed that there were five phases of improvements and additions to the castle complex, with initial changes occurring in the 13th century. Changes included extensions to the tower and outer domestic structures. The north extension consists of a fireplace and an oven.

== History ==
The late 12th-century chronicle, the Orkneyinga Saga, tells of a Norwegian landowner named Kolbein hrúga, who built a 'fine stone castle" (steinkastala) on the island of Wyre around 1145 AD. The mid-13th-century biography of King Haakon IV of Norway, Hagonar Saga, describes the castle as difficult to attack during a siege in 1231. The name, "Cobbie Row", is an alteration of Kolbein Hruga's Norse nickname, "Kobbie" or "Kubbie". "Row" (or "Roo") is adapted from his second name, "hrúga". The castle has been also referred to as "Cubbie Roo", "Cubbie Row", and "Cobbie Roo".

Cobbie Row's Castle is believed to be the oldest medieval castle in Scotland. At the bottom of the hill where the castle stands, are the ruins of St. Mary's Chapel. The chapel was probably built by Hrúga or his son, Bjarni Kolbeinsson, Bishop of Orkney during the mid- to late 12th century. The site of the castle and nearby chapel suggest that the island of Wyre was a powerful and prosperous Norse estate during the medieval era.

Historic Environment Scotland established the site as a scheduled monument in 1929.

== Gallery ==
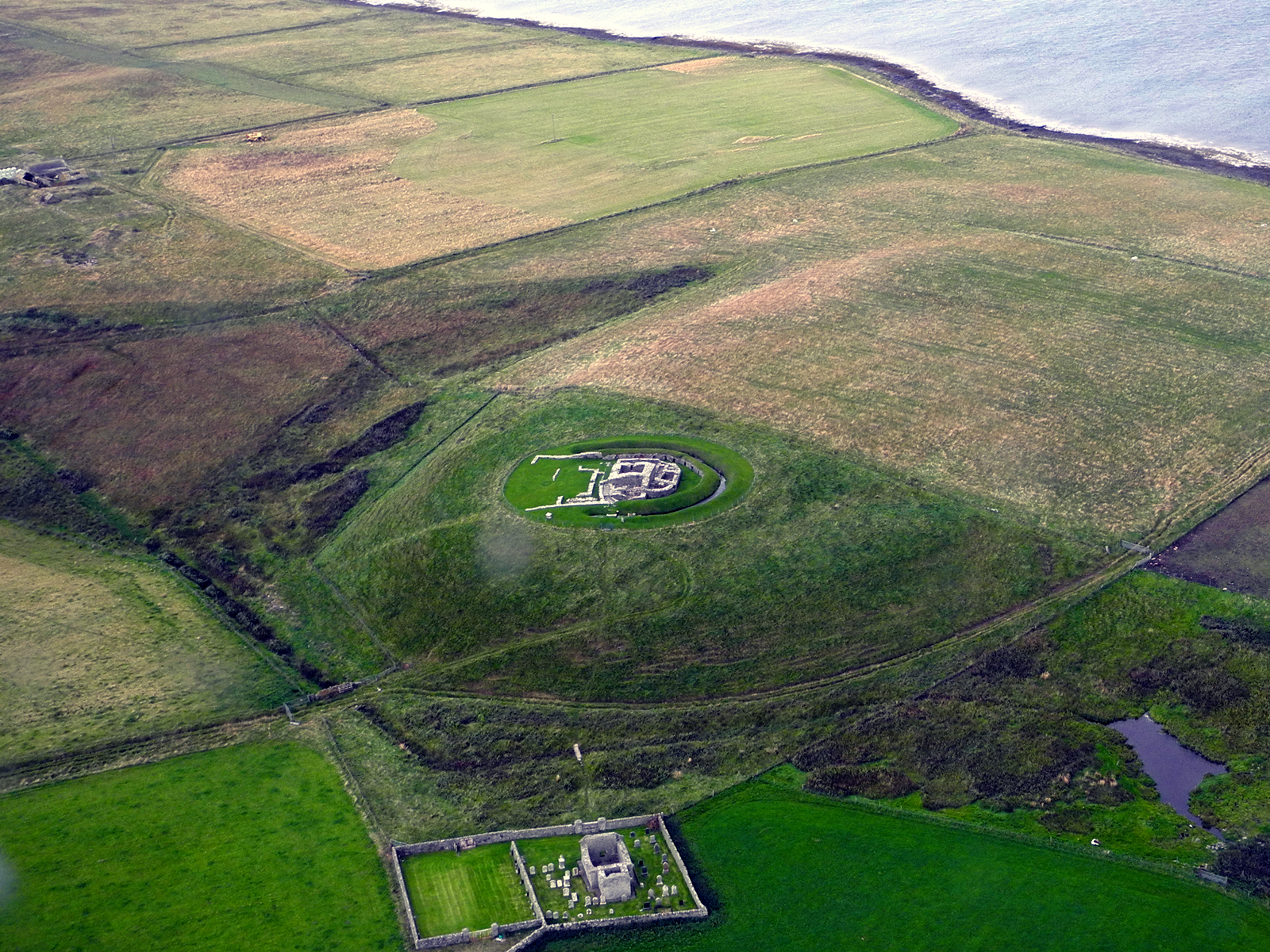
Aerial view of Cobbie Row's Castle and below, St. Mary's Chapel

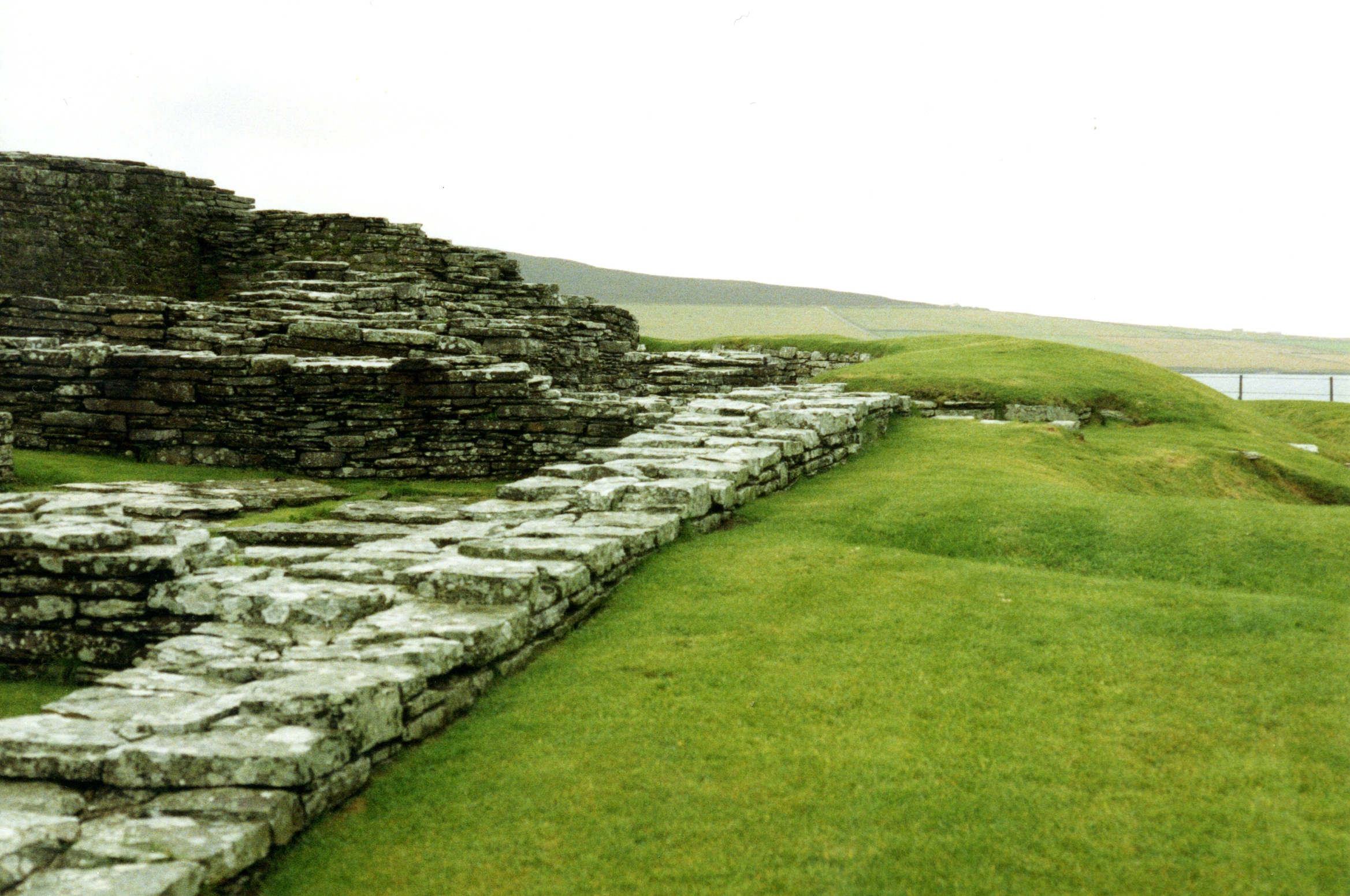
Ruins of Cobbie Row's Castle

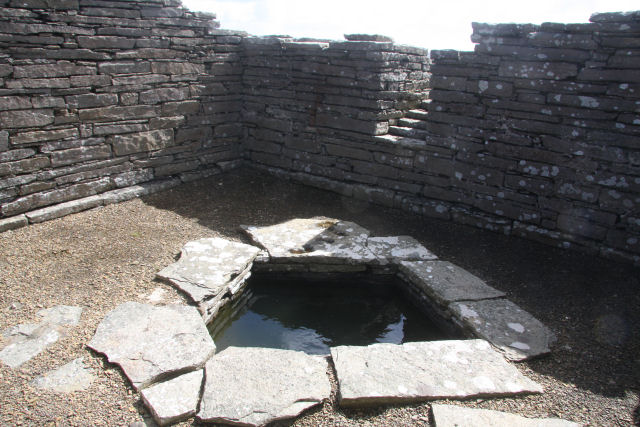
Interior of Cobbie Row's Castle

== See also ==
- Bishop's Palace, Kirkwall
- The Norse settlement at Jarlshof, Shetland Islands
