= Balfour, Orkney =

Coordinates: 59.030°N 2.907°W

Balfour
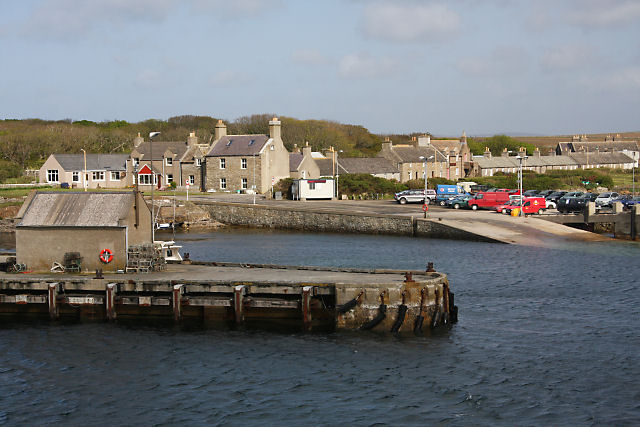
- Balfour Harbour, quay and slipway

- Location within Orkney
- OS grid reference: HY479164
- Civil parish: Shapinsay
- Council area: Orkney Islands
- Lieutenancy area: Orkney Islands
- Country: Scotland
- Sovereign state: United Kingdom
- Post town: ORKNEY
- Postcode district: KW17
- Dialling code: 01856
- Police: Scotland
- Fire: Scottish
- Ambulance: Scottish
- UK Parliament: Orkney and Shetland
- Scottish Parliament: Orkney

Balfour is a village on the island of Shapinsay, Orkney. The village is situated on Elwick Bay, which was used as an anchorage by Haakon IV of Norway before sailing south to eventual defeat at the Battle of Largs in 1263. Today, the village still possesses a harbour, with mock defensive walls constructed at the same time as the castle. David Balfour even added a stone marked with the date 1725, taken from Noltland Castle on the island of Westray, to his defences. A car ferry to Kirkwall, operated by Orkney Ferries, sails from a pier at the harbour. This became a roll-on/roll-off service in 1990.

== History ==
Originally known as Shoreside, Balfour was built in the 1780s by Thomas Balfour, a former tenant farmer who acquired a private income by marrying the sister of an Earl. With his new-found wealth, Balfour purchased the estate of Sound, whose estate house had been burned down in revenge for the then owner's support of the Jacobite rising of 1745. In 1782, to make way for a new residence, Balfour cleared cottars from the south-west of the island, and appropriated part of the common, building the village of Shoreside to house those evicted. To help finance his building work, Thomas Balfour borrowed money from his brother John, who made his fortune serving with the British East India Company.

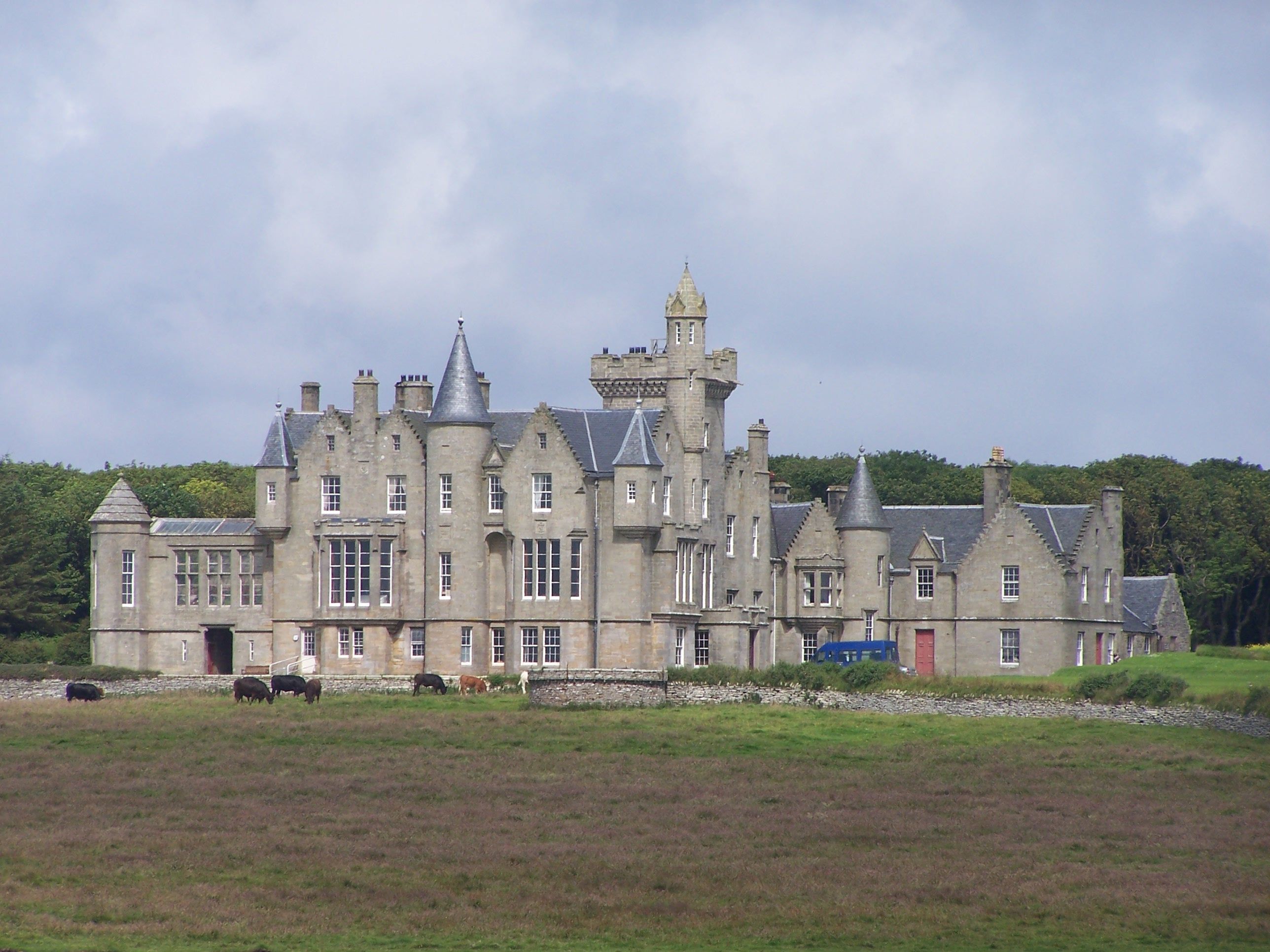
Balfour is dominated by its castle

In 1846 his grandson, David Balfour, inherited the estate, which now encompassed the whole of the island. The following year, he recruited an Edinburgh architect, David Bryce, to transform Cliffdale House into the Scottish Baronial Balfour Castle.

At the same time, many changes were made to the village, which was renamed Balfour. While some of the village was demolished in order to improve the view from the castle, many improvements were made. Balfour added an imposing gatehouse, which became the village pub and home to the local football team, but it is no longer a public house. Balfour also added a water mill and a gas works, which remained operational until the 1920s. In order to supply the water mill, a river was dammed, creating the wetland known as Mill Dam, which is now a significant bird habitat, owned and managed by the Royal Society for the Protection of Birds. The reserve is home to many species of birds, including water rails, pintails, waders and black-headed gulls. Whooper swans have also been known to breed here.

In 1960 the castle was purchased by Tadeusz Zawadzki, a Polish Cavalry officer and it operated as a hotel. It is now a private residence.

Electricity was introduced via undersea cable in the 1970s.

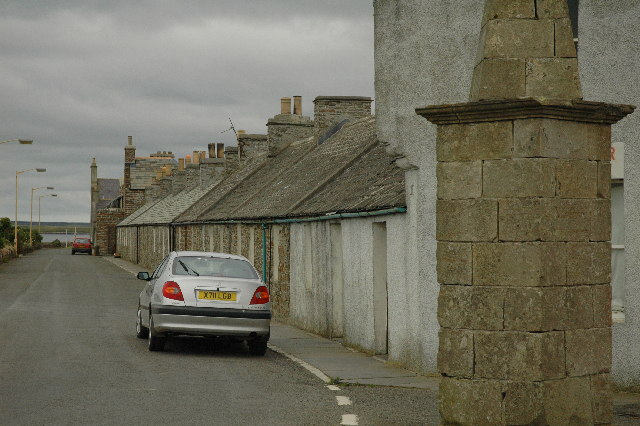
The main street of the village.

== Notable buildings ==
Balfour's former smithy is now home to the Shapinsay Heritage Centre, a craft shop and a cafe. The village also includes a shop and the island's only petrol pump.

== See also ==
- Shapinsay
- Balfour Castle
