= Balfour Castle =

Country house in Orkney, Scotland

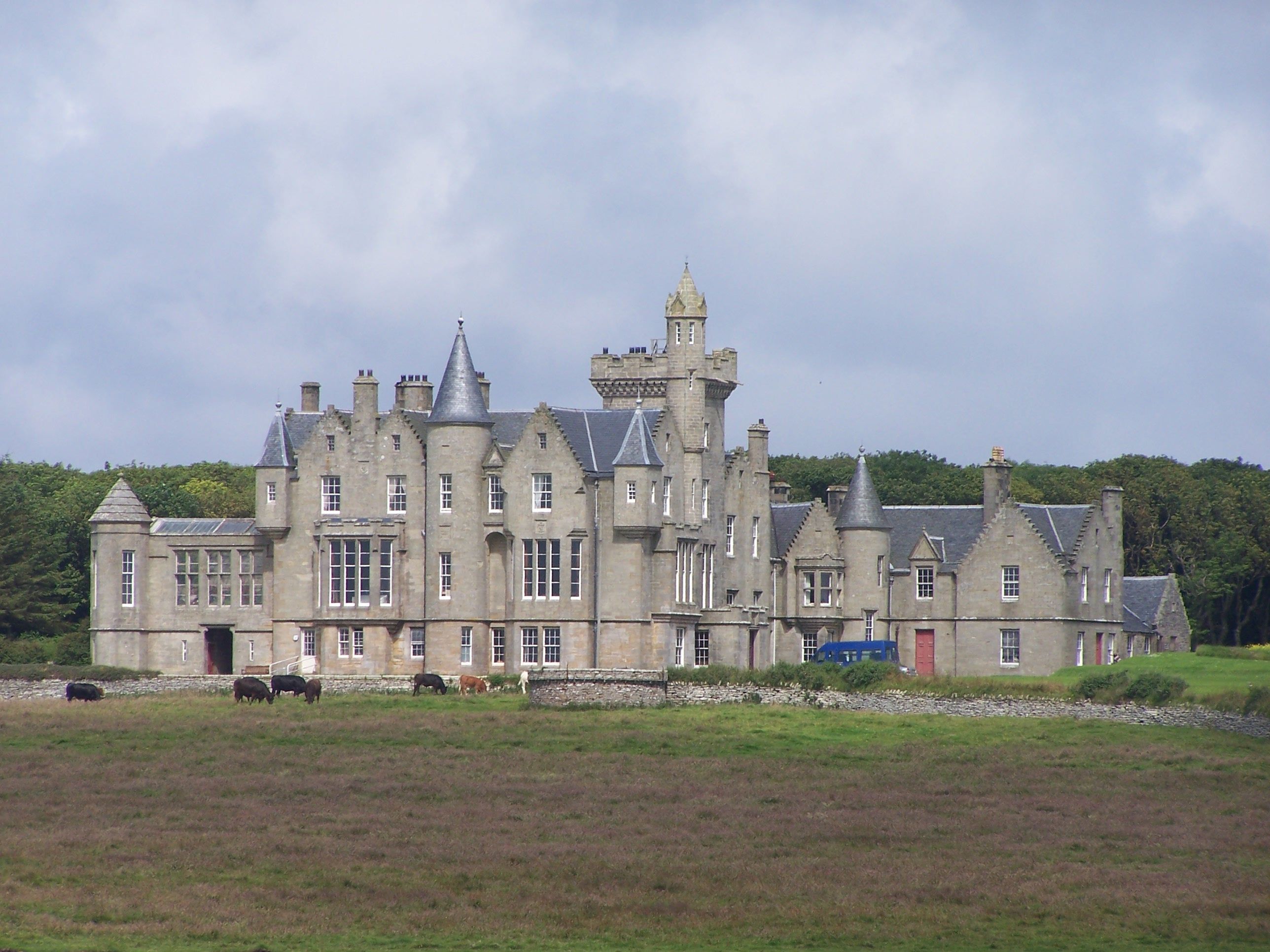
- Balfour Castle in 2007
- Interactive map of Balfour Castle
- 59°01′54″N 02°55′00″W
- Location: Shapinsay, Orkney, Scotland

History
- Built: 1847

Site notes
- Architect: David Bryce
- Owner: Private

Listed Building – Category A
- Official name: Balfour Castle (With Garden Gateway) Sound
- Designated: 8 December 1971
- Reference no.: LB18615

Inventory of Gardens and Designed Landscapes in Scotland
- Official name: Balfour Castle
- Designated: 1 July 1987
- Reference no.: GDL00038

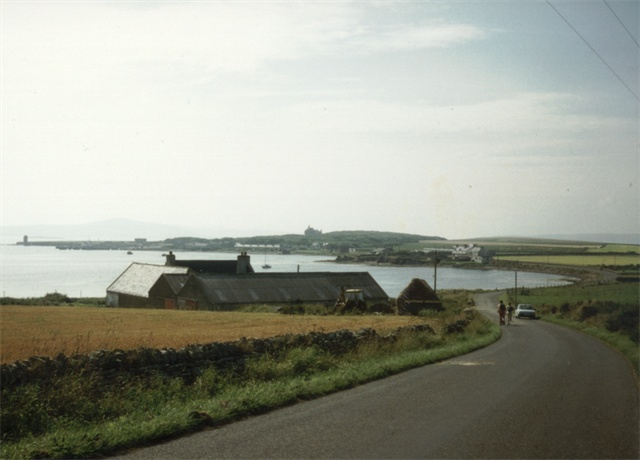
Elwick. Looking south west across the square to Balfour Castle in the distance.

Balfour Castle is a historic building on the southwest of Shapinsay, Orkney Islands. Though built around an older structure that dates at least from the 18th century, the present castle was built in 1847, commissioned by Colonel David Balfour, and designed by Edinburgh architect David Bryce. It is a Category A listed building and the landscape and formal gardens are listed in the Inventory of Gardens and Designed Landscapes in Scotland.

== History ==
The small island of Shapinsay has been inhabited since prehistoric times, the most notable evidence being the extant Broch of Burroughston, located not far from Balfour Castle to the northeast. The Mor Stein standing stone dating to the Neolithic is found also to the east of Balfour Castle, indicating the length of human activity in the area. On the site of Balfour Castle was originally part of the Estate of Sound, which included a stately home that was destroyed by British Hanoverian soldiers during the Jacobite rising of 1745. In 1782, the area was sold to Major Thomas Balfour, who built a new house on the site. By 1846, all of the land on the island around the castle, including the nearby ruins of Linton Chapel, had been purchased by Balfour's grandson, David Balfour. Balfour then constructed Balfour Castle to the designs of the architect David Bryce in Bryce's first large commission. It was built as an L shaped house The gardens were also installed by the gardener Craigie Inglis Halkett. In the 1850s, the castle was landscaped to give it a mock portcullis and parapets with the walled garden being renovated.

During the Second World War, the Balfour family opened the castle to the public during the summer as a way to raise funds for the war effort. The Balfour family remained at the castle until 1962 when they sold it to the Polish Captain Tadeusz Zawadski. Zawadzki renovated the castle as his private home, apparently fulfilling a Gypsy prophecy he had heard back in Poland that he would one day live in a castle. As of 2021, the castle was operating as a hotel, but by 2025 had returned to its original use as a private residence.

== See also ==
- Balfour, Orkney
- Mill Dam, Shapinsay
- Vasa Loch
