= Eynhallow Church =

Medieval church located on the island of Eynahallow in Orkney

Coordinates: 59°08′29″N 3°07′19″W

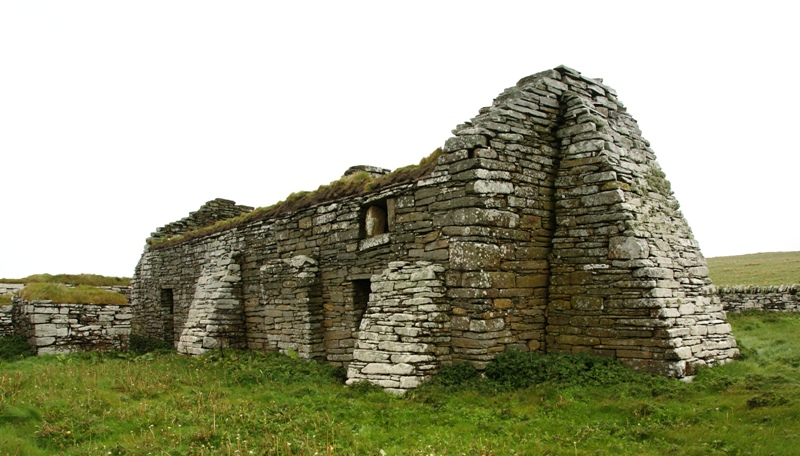
Eynhallow Church, view from the southeast.

Eynhallow Church is a ruined medieval church located on the uninhabited island of Eynhallow in Orkney, Scotland. The church dates back to the 12th-century and is thought to have originally been a monastery. Near the church are the building remains from a post-medieval village. Historic Environment Scotland first listed the site as a scheduled monument in 1921.

== Description ==
The ruins of Eynhallow church are situated on a slope in southwestern Eynhallow, in Orkney, Scotland. The island lies between Rousay and Mainland, Orkney. The site consists of a roofless 12th-century church, measuring 21 m (69 ft) by 7 m (23 ft) across. The church was later modified and was used as a residential dwelling, beginning in the 16th century.

Much of the church's original fabric is still visible. The best surviving features of the church are the walls of the porch, the gables in the nave, and the foundation of the chancel walls. The interior contains a rectangular sized nave with a porch at its west end and a square-ended chancel at the east end. A tower may have later been added on top of the west porch. Several pieces of carved, red sandstone were later found in an outbuilding. To the southwest of the church is the site of a 16th-century settlement. The settlement contains the remains of at least four adjoining houses. These houses may have built upon earlier structures, possibly buildings connected with the church. The settlement is approximately 30 m (98 ft) by 30 m (98 ft) in size.

Eynhallow is normally accessible by private boat from Rousay or Mainland, Orkney. Currently (January, 2022), the site is listed as "not open to visitors due to high level masonry inspections".

== History ==
Little is known about the history of Eynhallow Church. It may have been part of a monastery, possibly of the Benedictine order. It has been determined that the church was built in the 12th century. Because of the name of the island, it is likely that Eynhallow was an important religious centre. Eyin-Helha is Old Norse for Holy Isle.

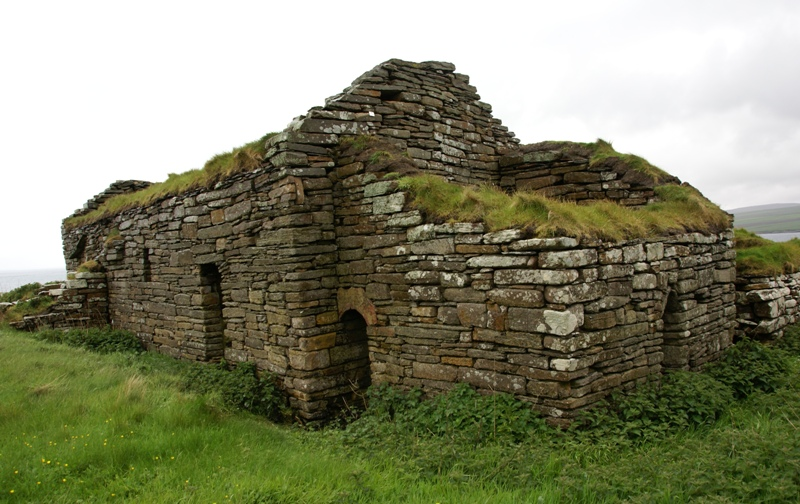
View from northwest. On the right the 12th century western porch.

Eynhallow as island church or monastery, was abandoned by the 16th century. The church was later modified and used as a residential dwelling. In 1851 there were 4 cottages remaining on the island. When the residents became ill, possibly due to a contaminated water supply, they were evacuated off the island. When the cottages were torn down, and the roof was pulled off one of the cottages, the foundation of the medieval church was discovered. The remains were later studied by antiquarians, T.S. Muir and Sir Henry Dryden. In 1897, the ruins were examined further by Professor T. Lethaby. In 1911 the site was placed in the guardianship of the Office of Works. Eynhallow church was first scheduled as a monument by Historic Environment Scotland in 1921.

Eynhallow is considered to be an important site in Norse folklore. It is said to be the home of the Finfolk, a mysterious tribe of mythical shapeshifters. The island was described in the Orkneyinga Saga, an anonymous narrative of the history of the Orkney and Shetland islands. The story is told of Olaf, the foster son of Svein Asleifarson and ward of Kolbein Hruga, who was kidnapped from Eynhallow in 1155. Olaf was most likely a student at the monastery at the time.
