= Mor Stein =

Neolithic standing stone on the island of Shapinsay, Scotland

Coordinates: 59°2′12″N 2°49′47″W

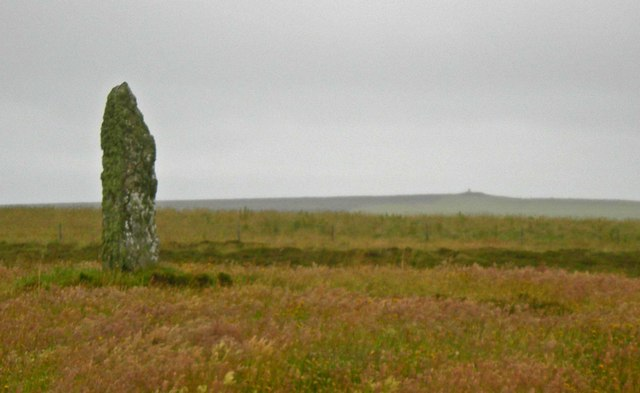
The Mor Stein, standing stone

Mor Stein is a Neolithic standing stone in the southeastern part of the island of Shapinsay, Orkney Islands, Scotland. Shapinsay is one of the two large inner islands of the Orkney group, and it is situated approximately two miles north of the Orkney Mainland. Linton Bay is situated slightly to the northeast of Mor Stein.

Mor Stein is a vertical standing stone of approximately 3.2 metres (10 ft) in height, which is unshaped and uncarved and stands in a field somewhat separate from any other man-made features of the island. A few miles to the north is Burroughston Broch with its earth cladding intact, allowing visitors to peer down into the broch from above.

== See also ==
- Balfour Castle – Country house in Orkney, Scotland
- The Ouse – tidal estuary in northern Shapinsay, Orkney Islands, Scotland, UK
