= Walter Baetke =

German philologist

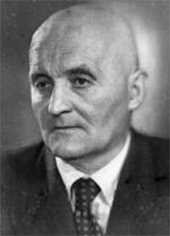
- Born: 28 April 1888; Sternberg in der Neumark, German Empire
- Died: 15 February 1978 (aged 89); Leipzig, Germany

Academic background
- Education: University of Berlin

Academic work
- Discipline: Germanic studies
- Institutions: University of Berlin; University of Leipzig
- Main interests: Germanic religion

Walter Hugo Hermann Baetke (28 March 1884, Sternberg in der Neumark – 15 February 1978, Leipzig) was a German historian of religion who specialized in Germanic studies. He was Professor of the History of Religion at the University of Leipzig.

== Life and career ==
Baetke's father, Wilhelm Baetke, was a police official. Baetke attended a gymnasium in Stettin. From 1902 to 1907, Baetke studied Germanic studies, English studies, education and philosophy at the Universities of Halle and Berlin, graduating from Halle in 1907 with a qualification to teach in higher education and earning a doctorate in English there in 1908 with a thesis on children in the works of Shakespeare's contemporaries and successors. He then worked as a school examiner and at another gymnasium in Stettin and from 1913 to 1935 was head of a school in Bergen auf Rügen. After one year teaching the history of Germanic religion at the University of Greifswald, he was appointed Professor of the History of Religion at the University of Leipzig in 1936. In 1946 he received an honorary doctorate from the Faculty of Theology and was also appointed to an additional position as Professor of Nordic Philology. He also headed the university's Institute for the History of Religion. From 1947 to 1949, he was Dean of the Faculty of Philosophy. He retired in 1955 but from 1955 to 1959 held an emeritus position as "commissar" of the Institute for the History of Religion and the Old Norse division of the Institute for Germanic Studies.

His academic work focussed on ancient Germanic religion, on which he published extensively. Already before World War II, he was known as "a critic of romantic excess" in interpretations. In his 1934 Art und Glaube der Germanen, he rejected Herman Wirth's view of the genuineness and importance of the Oera Linda Book and also systematically opposed Bernhard Kummer's views in Midgards Untergang. In 1942 in Das Heilige im Germanischen, he opposed Rudolf Otto's influential viewpoint that the source of religion lay in a "stirring in the heart" of awareness of the numinous, arguing that all religious experience has a social and historical context. In Yngvi und die Ynglinger (1964) he dismissed the widely accepted view espoused by, for example, Otto Höfler that Germanic peoples had sacral kingship. The issue and his arguments are still debated today: in a re-examination in 2004, Olof Sundqvist substantially agreed, finding that "this paradigm [sacral kingship] implies a number of methodological difficulties"; Francis Oakley, however, argued in 2010 that although Baetke successfully rebutted the notion that Scandinavian kings were worshipped, he could not dismiss the evidence that they had some sacral status as mediators with the gods.

== Personal and political ==
Baetke joined the conservative German National People's Party in 1926 and was a member until 1932. From 1934 until the end of the war, he belonged to the National Socialist People's Welfare organisation. However, he never joined the Nazi Party or any of its subsidiaries, including the Reich Author's Organisation, and during the war his election to the examining board of the Faculty of Theology at the University of Leipzig and to the Saxon Academy of Sciences both went unratified by the regime. In 1946 he joined the SPD and subsequently became a member of the Socialist Unity Party of Germany, the official party of the Soviet Occupation Zone and later of East Germany. He was a member of the Confessing Church and was a delegate to the conference of the World Council of Churches in Amsterdam in 1948 from the Evangelical Lutheran Church of Saxony.

Baetke was married twice: in 1911 to Agnes Kirsten (1885–1945) and in 1948 to Erna Knegendorf (1903–2000). Both his wives were teachers.

== Honours ==
- 1943, ratified 1945: Member, Saxon Academy of Sciences
- 1946: Honorary doctorate in Theology, University of Leipzig
- 1959: Order of Patriotic Merit in silver, German Democratic Republic
- 1946: Named "Distinguished People's Scholar", German Democratic Republic
- 1974: Moritz Wilhelm Drobisch Medal, Saxon Academy of Sciences

In 1949/50 Baetke lectured at the Universities of Lund and Uppsala, the first German academic to be invited to do so in Sweden since the war.

== Selected works ==
- Art und Glaube der Germanen. Hamburg: Hanseatische Verlagsanstalt, 1934.
- Das Heilige im Germanischen. Tübingen: Mohr, 1942.
- Yngvi und die Ynglinger; eine quellenkritische Untersuchung über das nordische "Sakral-köningtum". Sächsische Akademie der Wissenschaften zu Leipzig: Philologisch-historische Klasse: Sitzungsberichte. Berlin: Akademie, 1964.
- Wörterbuch zur altnordischen Prosaliteratur. Berlin: Akademie, 1965. 8th ed. 2008. ISBN 978-3-05-004897-0

== Festschrifts ==
- Festschrift Walter Baetke, dargebracht zu seinem 80. Geburtstag am 28. März 1964. Ed. Kurt Rudolph, Rolf Heller and Ernst Walter. Weimar: Böhlau, 1966.
- Altnordistik, Vielfalt und Einheit: Erinnerungsband für Walter Baetke, 1884-1978. Ed. Ernst Walter and Hartmut Mittelstädt. Weimar: Böhlau, 1989. ISBN 3-7400-0107-0

== See also ==
- Rudolf Simek
- Edgar C. Polomé
- Jan de Vries (philologist)

== Sources ==
- Fritz Heinrich and Kurt Rudolph. "Walter Baetke (1884–1978)". Zeitschrift für Religionswissenschaft 9 (2001) 169-84.
