= Wyre, Orkney =

Island of the Orkney Islands

Wyre
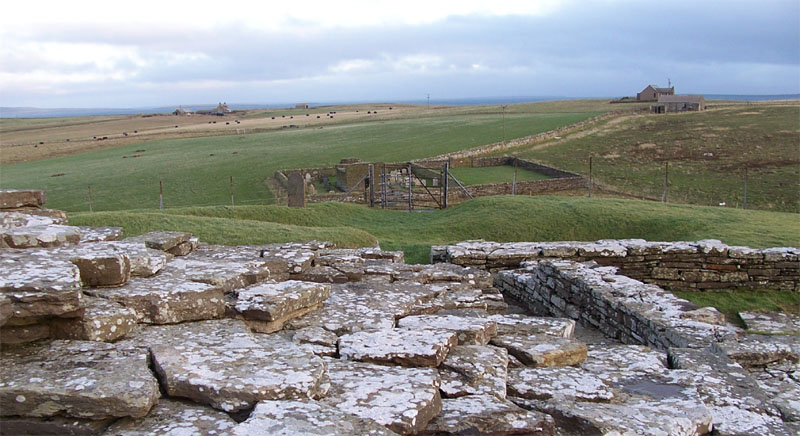
- Wyre, viewed from Cubbie Roo's Castle, with the ruined chapel and burial ground visible.

Location
- Wyre shown within Orkney
- OS grid reference: HY445262
- Coordinates: 59.12°N 2.97°W

Name
- Name meaning: spear head
- Old Norse name: Vígr

Physical geography
- Island group: Orkney Islands
- Area: 311 ha (1.20 sq mi)
- Area rank: 85
- Highest elevation: 32 m (105 ft)

Administration
- Council area: Orkney
- Country: Scotland
- Sovereign state: United Kingdom

Demographics
- Population: 8
- Population rank: 71
- Population density: 2.6 people/km^{2}
- Largest settlement: Hawn
- References: www.aroundrousay.co.uk/wyre.shtml

Wyre (historically known as Viera, Veira and Weir) is one of the Orkney Islands, lying south-east of Rousay. It is 311 hectares (1.20 sq mi) and 32 metres (105 ft) at its highest point. It is one of the smallest inhabited islands in the archipelago.

Orkney Ferries sail from the island to Tingwall on the Orkney Mainland, Egilsay and Rousay.

== Etymology ==
The name comes from Old Norse Vigr, which means spearhead, which refers the shape of the island.

== History ==
Wyre's history is still very apparent, and it has two ancient monuments maintained by Historic Scotland, Cubbie Roo's Castle and St. Mary's Chapel. Bishop Bjarni grew up on Wyre, and was the son of Kolbeinn Hrúga (see Cubbie Roo's Castle below). Collins Encyclopaedia of Scotland says that Bjarni

composed the only significant work of Norse poetry to have survived in the [Orkney] islands, his Lay of the Jomsvikings. He also played an important part in securing the canonisation of Earl Rognvald.

The poet Edwin Muir (1887–1959), known for his prominent part in the Scottish Renaissance, born in Deerness on Mainland, Orkney, spent much of his childhood on Wyre. In his autobiography he said of himself: "I'm an Orkneyman, a good Scandinavian", and commented that some of his happiest childhood years were spent here.

=== Cubbie Roo's Castle ===
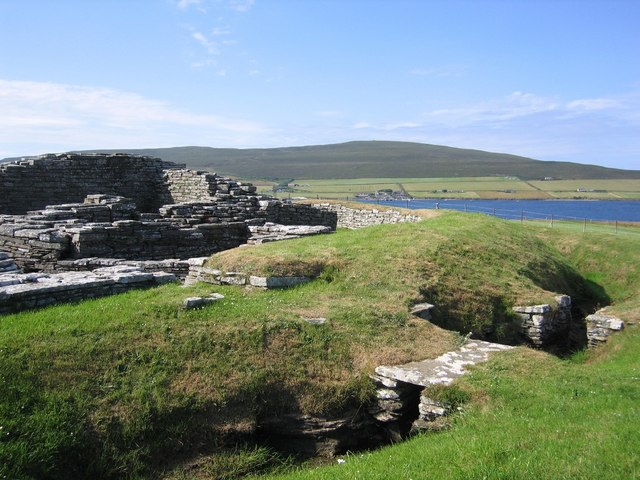
Cubbie Roo's Castle

Cubbie Roo's (or Cobbie Row's) Castle was built in the mid-12th century by Norse landowner Kolbeinn Hrúga. The stone fortification originally consisted of a small, central tower set in an oval enclosure, surrounded by two ditches, a stone wall and an earthen rampart. It is the oldest surviving medieval castle in Scotland and is mentioned in the Orkneyinga Saga as well as King Haakon's saga. Historic Environment Scotland established the site as a scheduled monument in 1929.

=== St Mary's Chapel ===
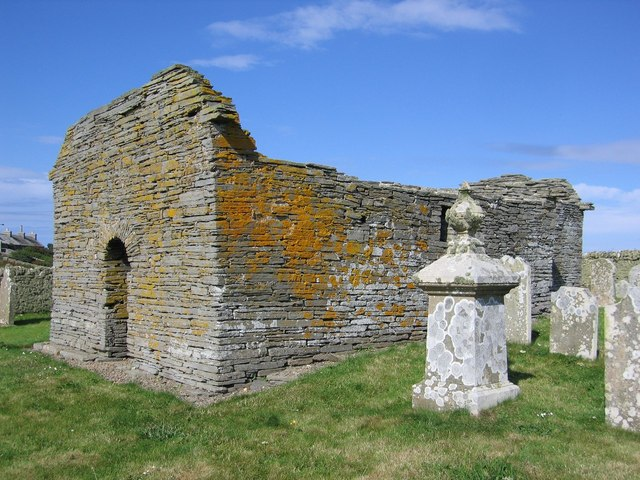
St. Mary's Chapel

In the centre of the island is the roofless, but largely complete, twelfth-century St Mary's Chapel. It is thought to have been built by a Norse chieftain, Kolbeinn hrúga or his son, Bjarni Kolbeinsson, Bishop of Orkney. The Romanesque style building was originally constructed of local rubble and lime mortar. During the late 19th century, the building was restored.

== Geography and geology ==
Like most of Orkney, Wyre is made up of Old Red Sandstone of the Devonian period.

The island is low lying, and is shaped like an isosceles triangle on its side. It is separated from Rousay by Wyre Sound. Rousay is to the north, Gairsay to the south, Stronsay to the east, Mainland to the south west, and Shapinsay to the south east. Bu ties with Ae in Dumfries and Galloway as being Britain's shortest name for a settlement.

== Wyre Sound ==
Wyre is separated from the neighbouring island of Rousay by the Wyre Sound. The sound experiences strong tides, which creates the perfect conditions for maerl beds to form. The maerl beds in turn provide a sheltered habitat for species as peacock worms and various sponges, as well as small fish, shrimps, gobies and crabs. Since 2014 the sound, along with the neighbouring Rousay Sound (which separates the islands of Rousay and Egilsay), has been designated as a Nature Conservation Marine Protected Area (NCMPA). Fishing activities are controlled within the MPA, and no dredging, beam trawling, demersal trawling or Seine fishing is permitted.

== Wildlife ==
Wyre is also known for its grey and common seals, and for birdlife including divers and ducks. The sounds around Wyre have been designated an Important Bird Area (IBA) by BirdLife International because they support a wintering population of common loons.

== See also ==
- List of islands of Scotland
