= Kolbeinn hrúga =

12th-century Norse chieftain

Kolbeinn hrúga was a 12th century Norse chieftain in Orkney. He figures prominently in the Orkneyinga saga. Kolbeinn was born in Sunnfjord, Norway. Around 1145, he arrived in Orkney. Shortly after his arrival, Kolbeinn was responsible for constructing numerous castles on the west side of the island of Wyre, which are some of the oldest of its kind in Orkney. The influence of Kolbeinn is attested by his contribution to elevating Eystein II to King of Norway.

The folkloric giant Cubbie Roo, alleged architect of Cobbie Row's Castle (among other geologic formations), may be named for Kolbeinn hrúga.

== Sources ==
- Walter Baetke (Hrsg.): Die Geschichten von den Orkaden, Dänemark und der Jomsburg (= Thule. Altnordische Dichtung und Prosa. 19, ZDB-ID 516164-2). Diederichs, Jena 1924, S. 21–392, (Nachdruck: Wissenschaftliche Buchgesellschaft u. a., Darmstadt u. a. 1966).
