= The Ouse =

Coordinates: 59°3′23″N 2°51′55″W

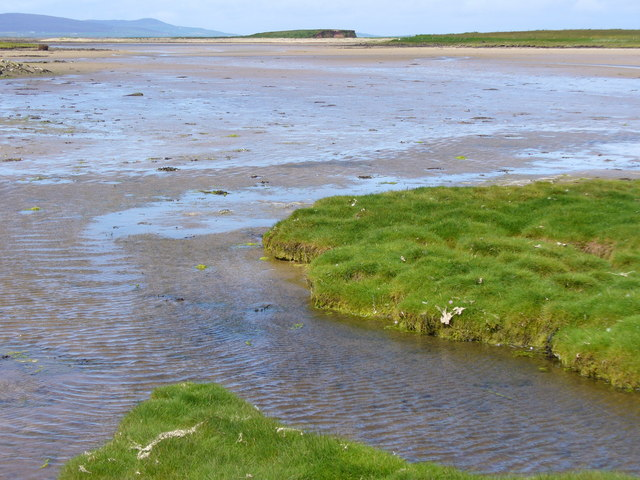
The Ouse

The Ouse is a tidal estuary in northern Shapinsay, Orkney Islands. This water body has been shown on early maps of the island in a very similar shape to its current geometry. The Ouse is fed by small rivulets and upland springs that rise on the western part of the island's northeast spur. pH levels of these feed waters are moderately alkaline, in the range of 9.1.

== See also ==
- Burroughston Broch
- Mor Stein
- Vasa Loch
