= Burroughston Broch =

Iron Age broch on Shapinsay in the Orkney Islands, Scotland

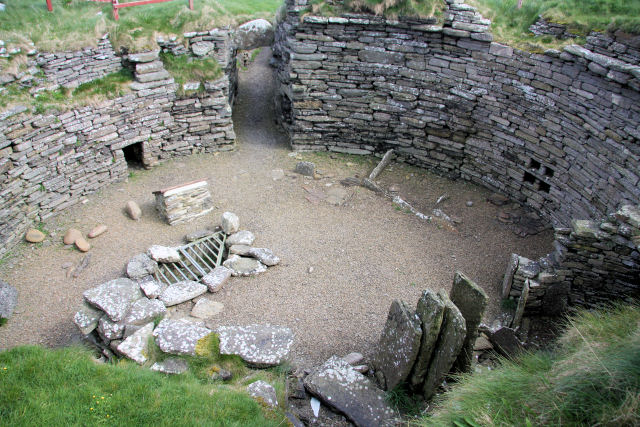
- Interior of Burroughston Broch

- Location within Orkney Islands
- 59°04′25″N 2°48′11″W
- Type: Broch
- Periods: Iron Age
- Location: Shapinsay

Scheduled monument
- Official name: Hillock of Burroughston, Broch
- Designated: 15 December 1953
- Reference no.: SM1421

Burroughston Broch is an Iron Age broch located on the island of Shapinsay in the Orkney Islands, in Scotland (grid reference HY54062100). The site overlooks the North Sea on the northeast part of Shapinsay. Excavated in the mid 19th century, Burroughston Broch is still well-preserved. The drystone walls are up to four metres thick in some parts and there is a complete chamber intact off the entrance passage. Some remains of stone fittings are evident in the interior.

== Location ==
Burroughston Broch overlooks the North Sea at the northeast corner of Shapinsay island, about 4 miles from the ferry pier. Slightly to the south lies Linton Bay. The broch stands at the foot of a gently sloping field just above the low rocky shoreline. It is one of the best preserved brochs in Orkney.

== Description ==
The walls of Burroughston Broch have an external diameter of around 18 metres, and an internal diameter of around 10 metres. From the outside, the building appears as a grassy mound, and little of the outer wall is exposed.

The entrance passage is on the east side, and is about 4 metres long, 1.2 metres wide and 1.8 metres high. There is an elongated guard room opening from the left side of the passage. Inside the broch, the outer face of the upper gallery is still visible, and traces of an opening to the upper gallery are still apparent. A deep well is present in the broch floor: the upper part being dry stone masonry, the lower being cut into the rock.

In the sloping area in front of the broch entrance are traces of "out-buildings" now covered with turf. A wall, ditch and rampart, which probably once encircled the broch, are still evident around the structure.

== Excavations ==
The broch was excavated around 1862 ("shortly after the discovery of Maes Howe") by the estate-workers of Colonel D. Balfour under the direction of the antiquarian George Petrie. Petrie made notes on the structures while Sir Henry Dryden made a plan of them. Excavation was confined to the interior of the broch and to a small area immediately outside the entrance.

Little information is known about the finds. According to Petrie, they were mostly deer-horn fragments, many ox and sheep bones and "several rude stone vessels of different sizes", including a possible triangular lamp.

== See also ==
- Balfour Castle
- Geo of Ork
- Quholm
- The Ouse

== Bibliography ==
- C. Michael Hogan, California Arts and Sciences Institute casicalifornia.org (2007) Burroughston Broch Megalithic Portal https://www.megalithic.co.uk/article.php?sid=7891
- C. Michael Hogan, California Arts and Sciences Institute casicalifornia.org (2007) Hilloch of Burroughston, Broch Modern Antiquarian. https://www.themodernantiquarian.com/post/63606/images/hillock_of_burroughston.html
- Spotting History (2023) Burroughston Broch, Orkney Islands https://www.spottinghistory.com/view/4576/burroughston-broch/
